= Kašėtų gyvenvietės =

- Site
- Location within Lithuania
- Coordinates: 54°5′2″N 24°36′2″E
- Country: Lithuania
- County: Alytus County
- Municipality: Varėna
- Time zone: UTC+2 (EET)
  - Summer (DST): UTC+3 (EEST)

Kašėtų gyvenvietės is an archaeological site in Varėna district municipality, in Alytus County, in southeastern Lithuania.
