= Jonionių gyvenvietės =

Coordinates: 54°09′30″N 24°07′10″E

- Site
- Interactive map of Jonionių gyvenvietės
- Country: Lithuania
- County: Alytus County
- Municipality: Varėna
- Time zone: UTC+2 (EET)
  - Summer (DST): UTC+3 (EEST)

Jonionių gyvenvietės is an archaeological site in Varėna district municipality, in Alytus County, in southeastern Lithuania.
