= Palkabalis =

Coordinates: 54°08′30″N 24°36′40″E

- Village
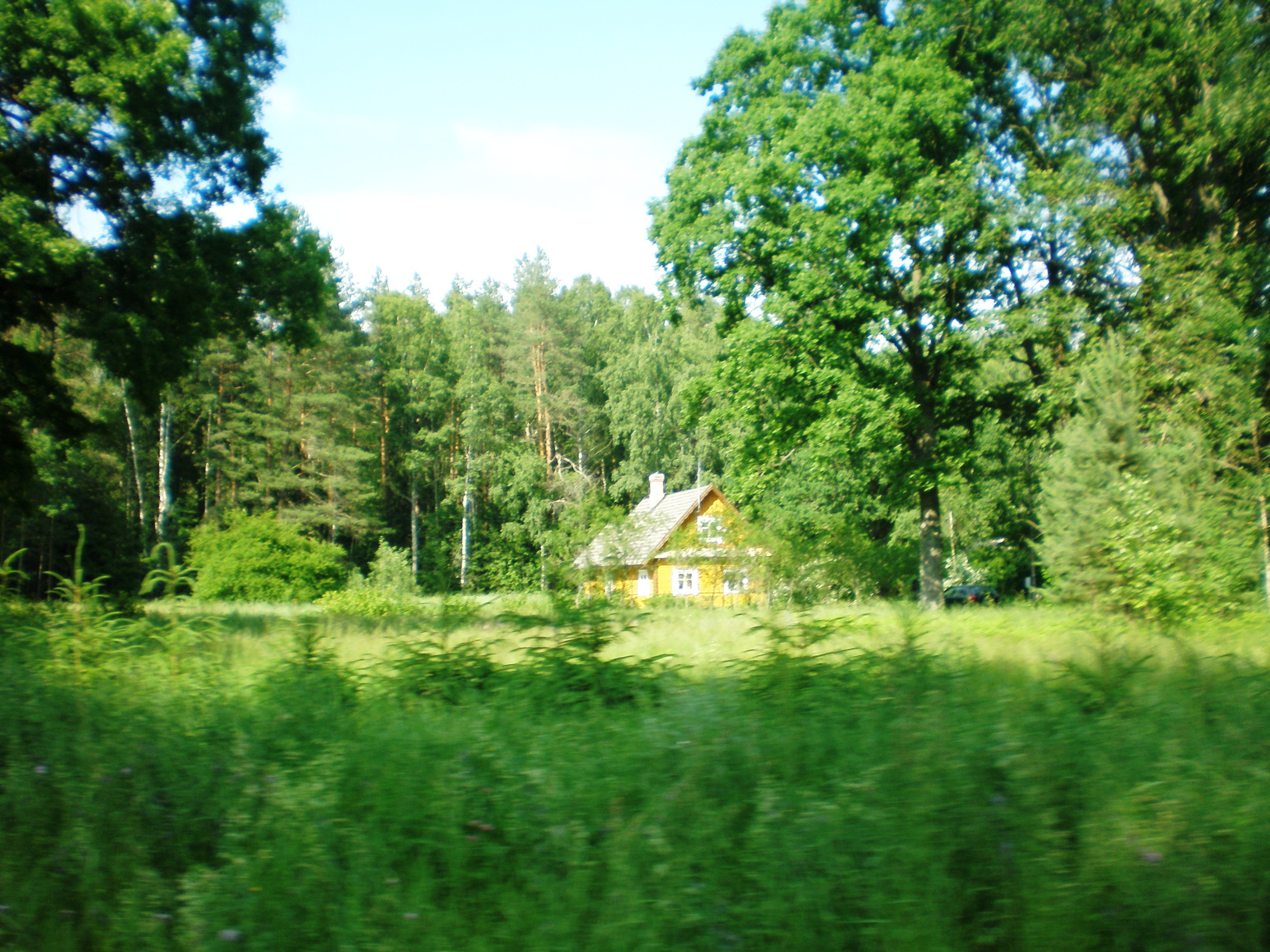
- Interactive map of Palkabalis
- Country: Lithuania
- County: Alytus County
- Municipality: Varėna

Population (2001)
  - Total: 22
- Time zone: UTC+2 (EET)
  - Summer (DST): UTC+3 (EEST)

Palkabalis is a village in Varėna district municipality, in Alytus County, in southeastern Lithuania. According to the 2001 census, the village has a population of 22 people.
