= Bingeliai =

Coordinates: 54°09′10″N 24°14′44″E

- Village
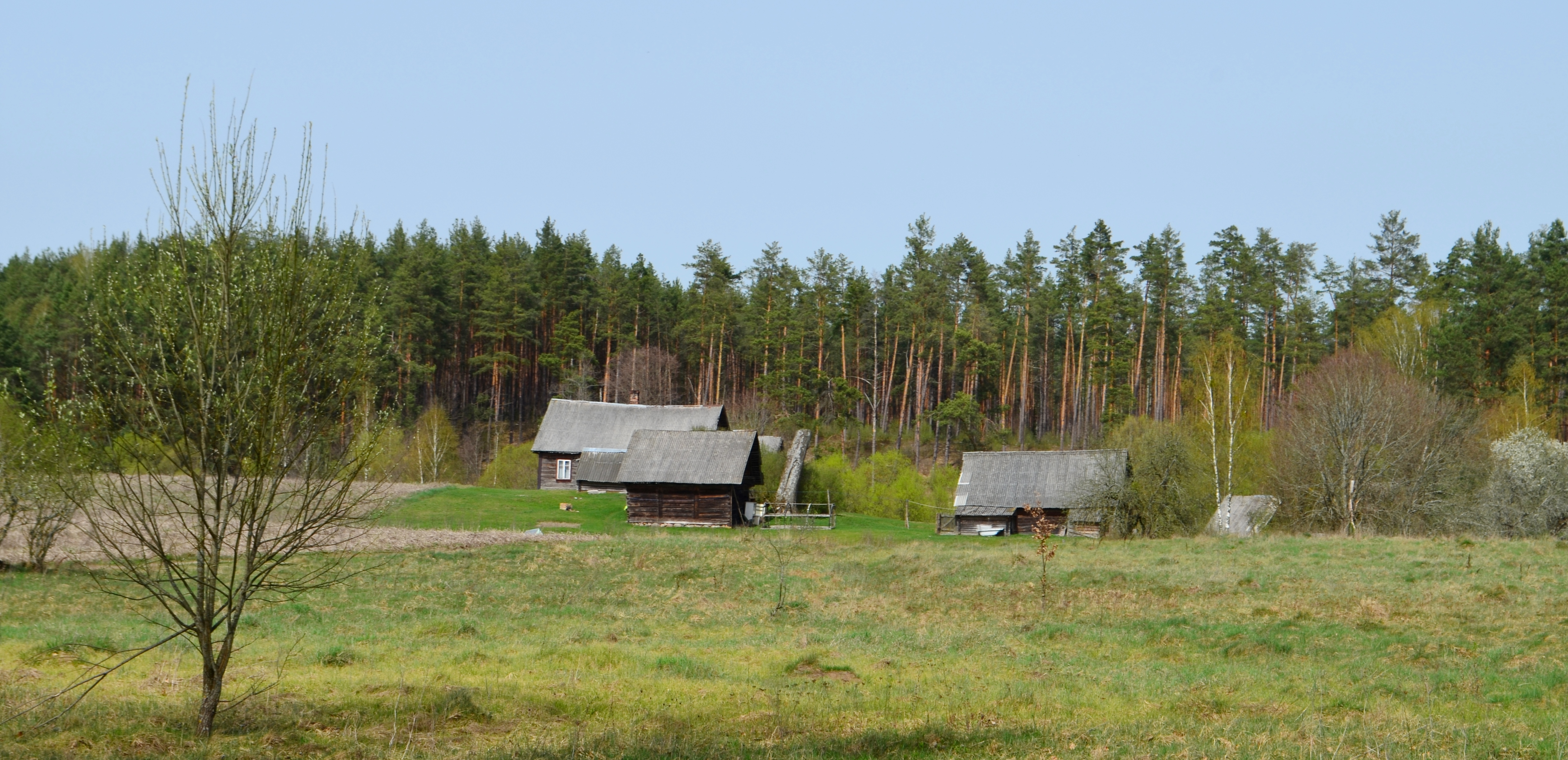
- Bingelių k., Varėnos raj.
- Interactive map of Bingeliai
- Country: Lithuania
- County: Alytus County
- Municipality: Varėna

Population (2001)
  - Total: 16
- Time zone: UTC+2 (EET)
  - Summer (DST): UTC+3 (EEST)

Bingeliai is a village in Varėna district municipality, in Alytus County, in southeastern Lithuania. According to the 2001 census, the village has a population of 16 people.
