= Masališkės =

Coordinates: 54°13′N 24°14′E

- Village
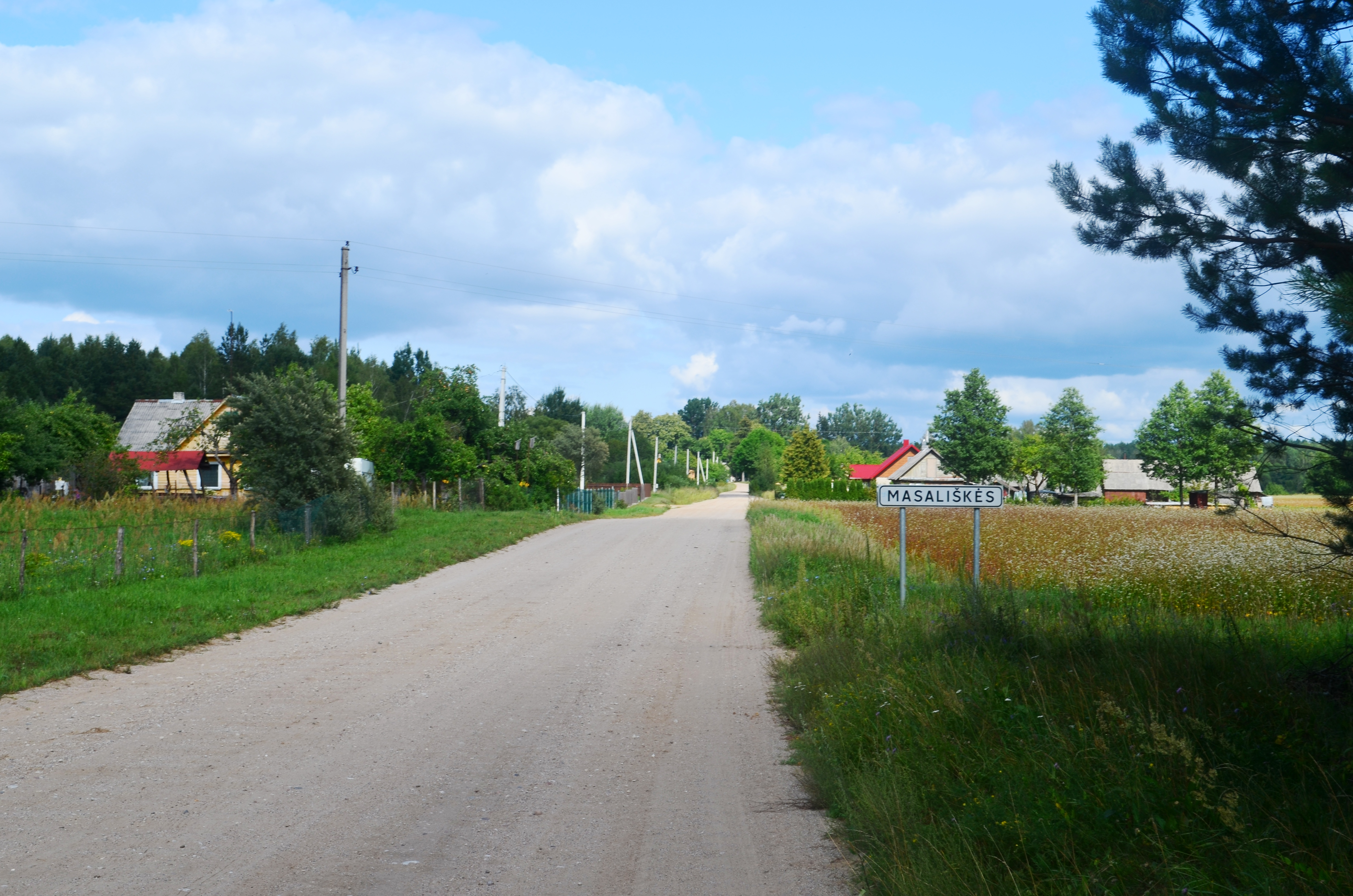
- Interactive map of Masališkės
- Country: Lithuania
- County: Alytus County
- Municipality: Varėna

Population (2001)
  - Total: 88
- Time zone: UTC+2 (EET)
  - Summer (DST): UTC+3 (EEST)

Masališkės is a village in Varėna district municipality, in Alytus County, in southeastern Lithuania. According to the 2001 census, the village has a population of 88 people.

Geographically, Masališkės is situated about 54 miles (or 86 kilometers) southwest of Vilnius, the capital city of Lithuania. The local timezone in Masališkės is Europe / Vilnius with a UTC offset of 3 hours. The area is serviced by seven nearby airports, one of which is a larger airport.
