= Maksimai =

Coordinates: 54°07′08″N 24°08′10″E

- Village
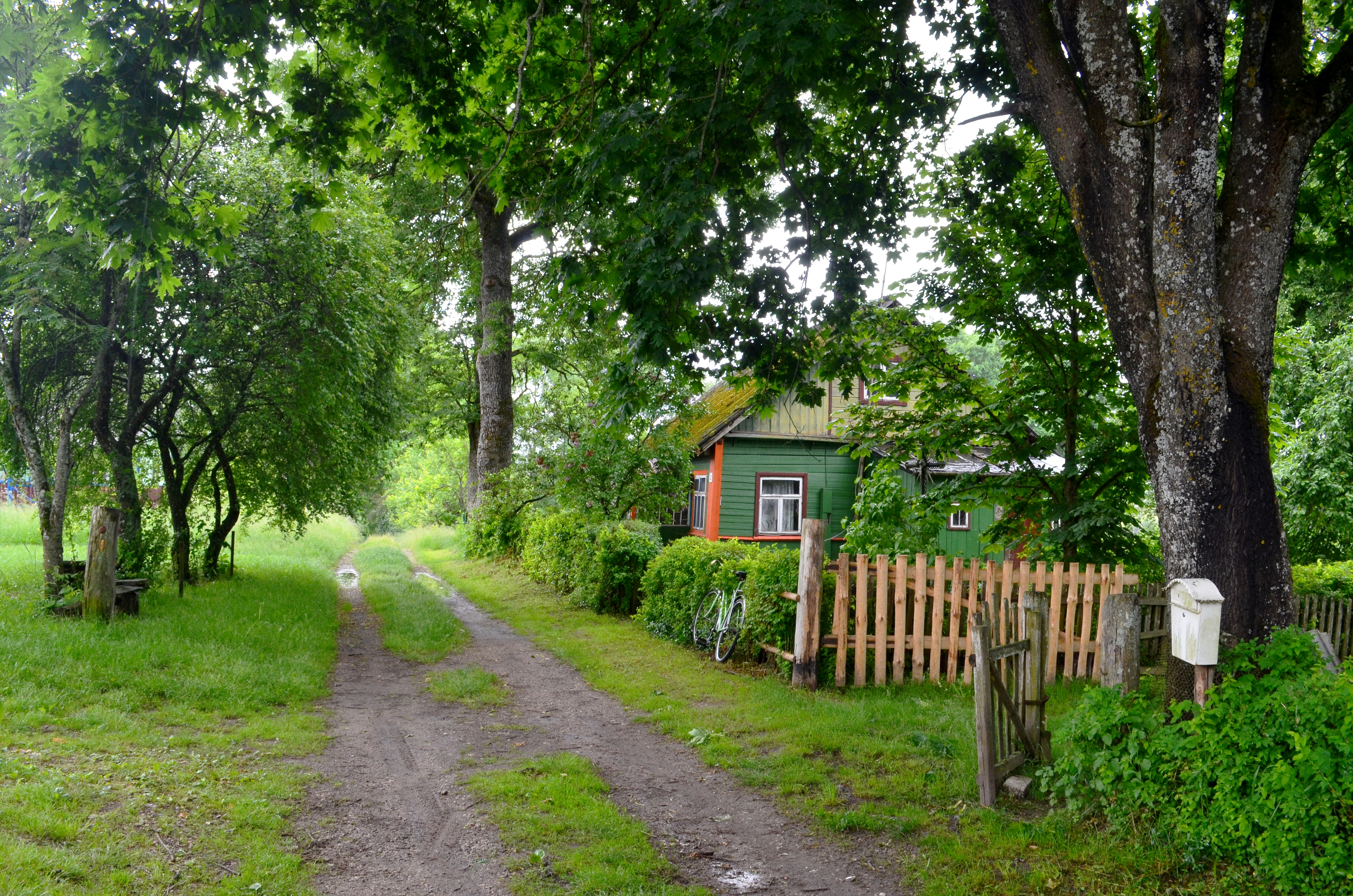
- Maksimai village, Varėna district
- Interactive map of Maksimai
- Country: Lithuania
- County: Alytus County
- Municipality: Varėna

Population (2001)
  - Total: 17
- Time zone: UTC+2 (EET)
  - Summer (DST): UTC+3 (EEST)

Maksimai is a village in Varėna district municipality, in Alytus County, in southeastern Lithuania. According to the 2001 census, the village has a population of 17 people.
