= Kareivonys (Varėna) =

- Village
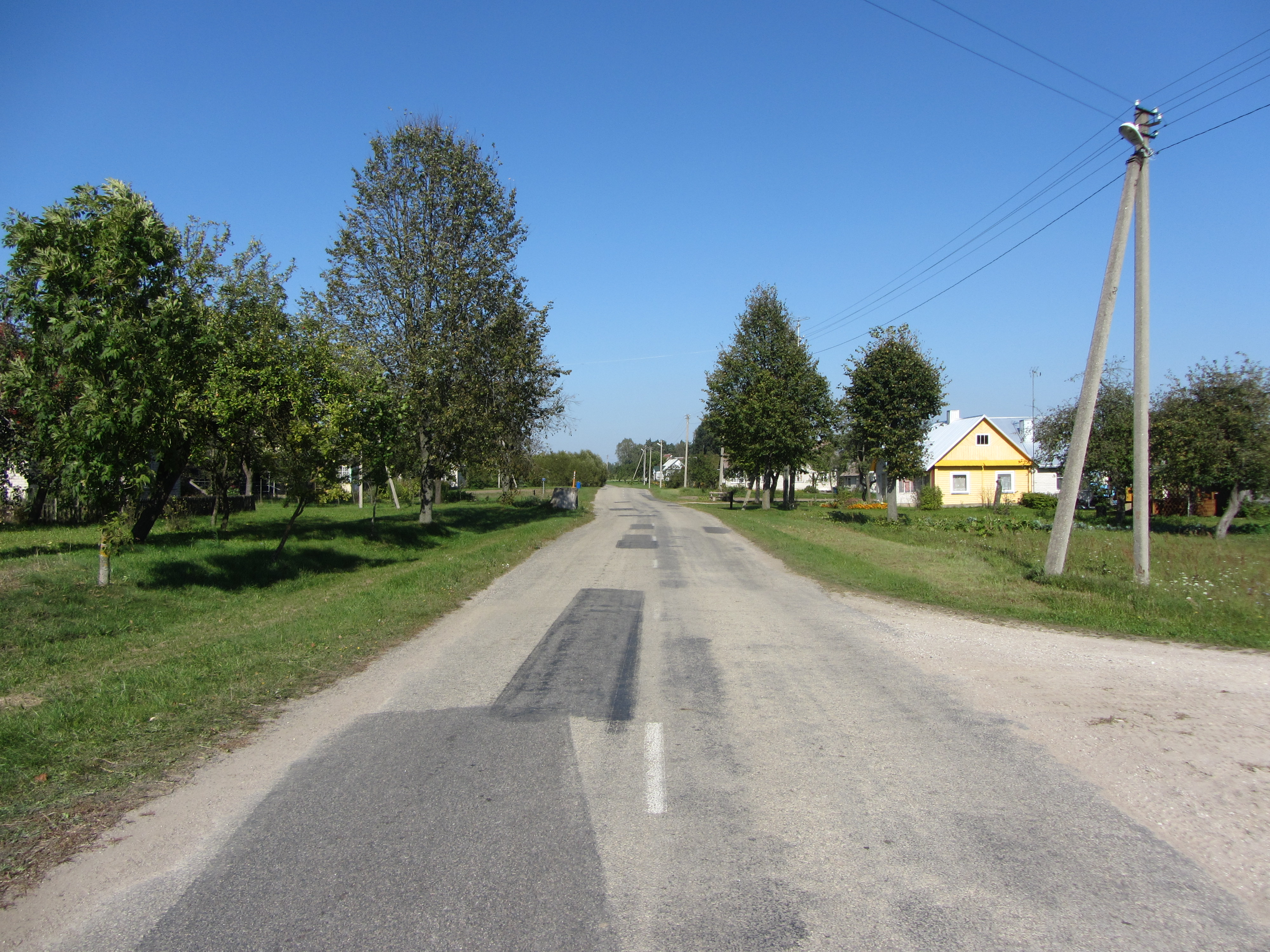

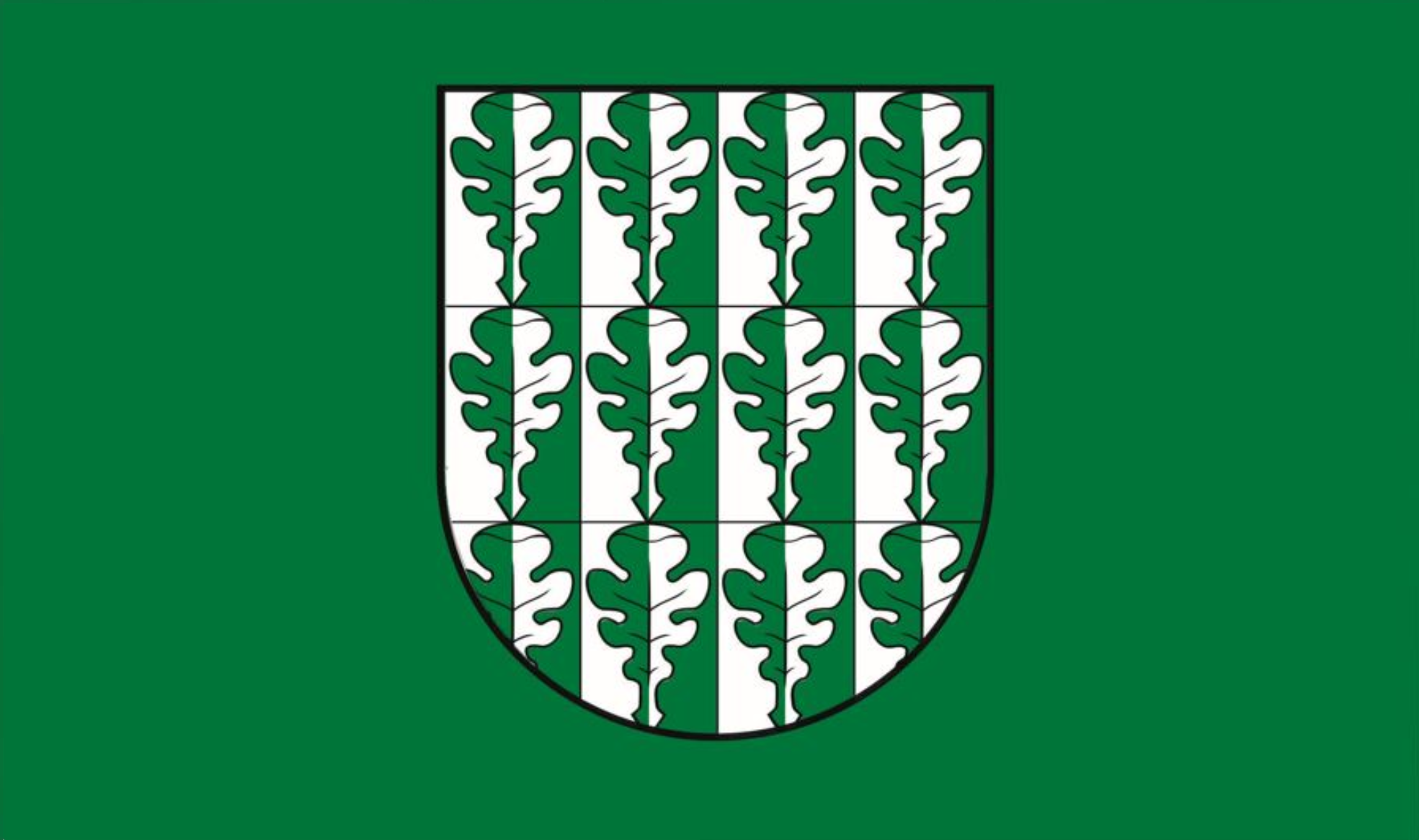
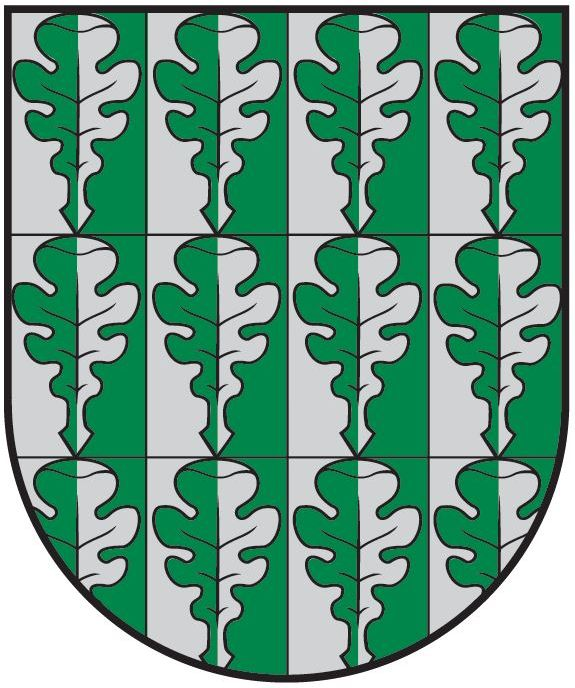
- Flag Seal

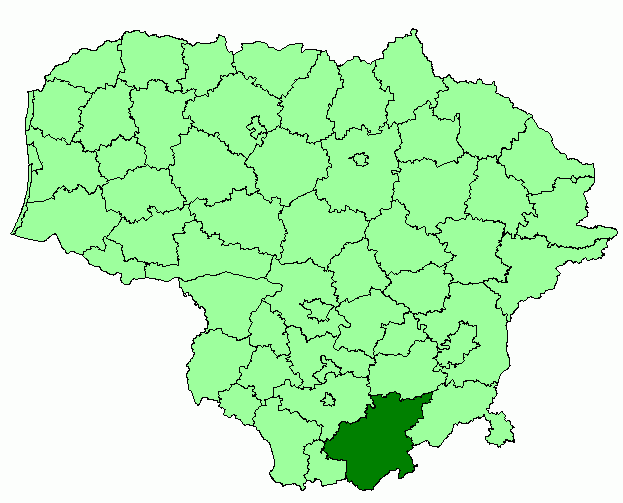
- Location in Varėna district municipality Location of Varėna district in Lithuania
- Coordinates: 54°24′29″N 24°37′19″E
- Country: Lithuania
- County: Alytus County
- Municipality: Varėna District Municipality
- Eldership: Jakėnų

Population (2021)
  - Total: 84
- Time zone: UTC+2 (EET)
  - Summer (DST): UTC+3 (EEST)

Kareivonys is a village in Jakėnai eldership, Varėna District Municipality, Alytus County, southeastern Lithuania. According to the 2001 census, the village had a population of 116 people. At the 2011 census, the population was 99.
