= Geidukonys =

Coordinates: 54°20′N 24°28′E

- Village
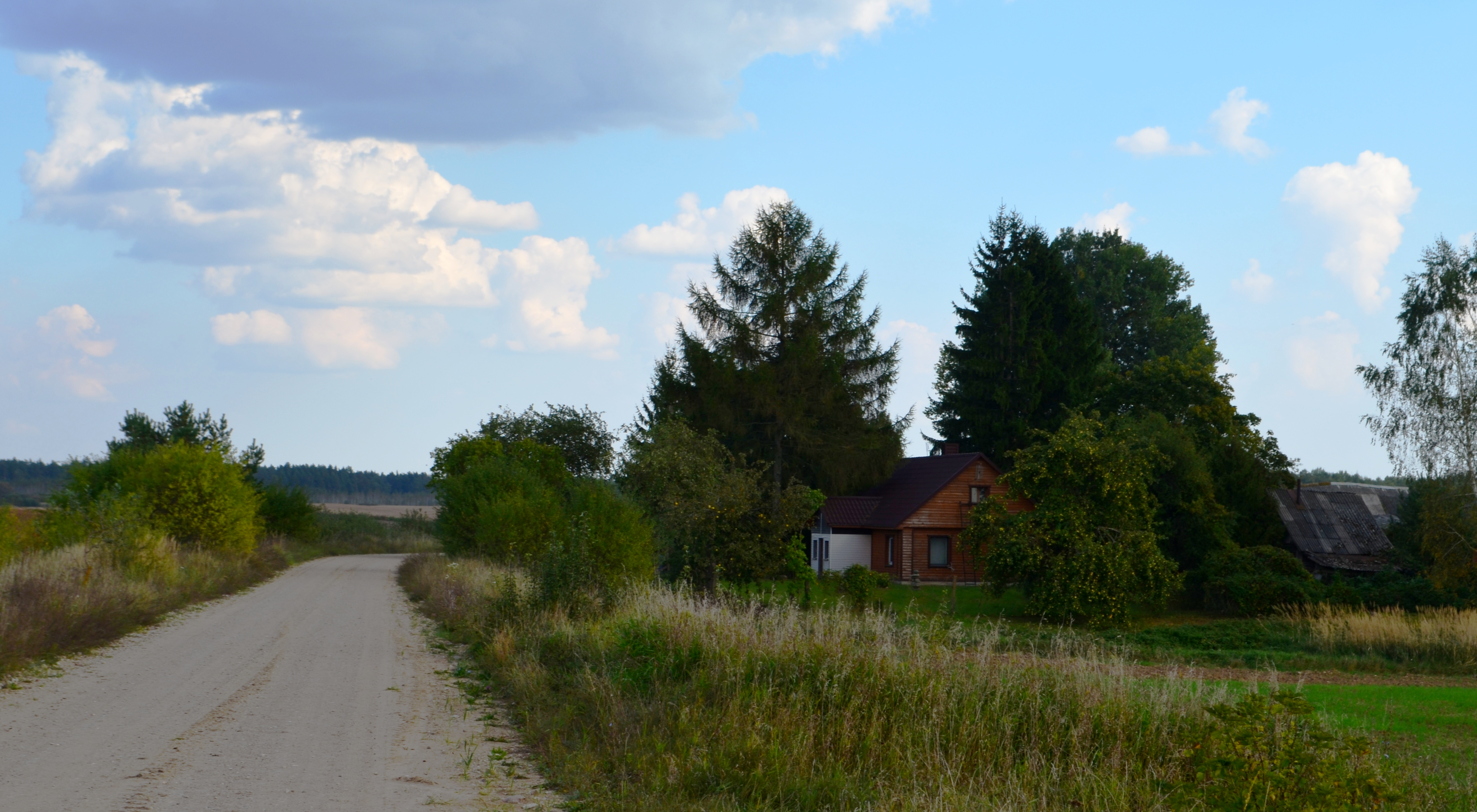
- Geidukonių k., Varėnos raj.
- Interactive map of Geidukonys
- Country: Lithuania
- County: Alytus County
- Municipality: Varėna

Population (2001)
  - Total: 48
- Time zone: UTC+2 (EET)
  - Summer (DST): UTC+3 (EEST)

Geidukonys is a village in Varėna district municipality, in Alytus County, in southeastern Lithuania. According to the 2001 census, the village has a population of 48 people.
