= Kirklionys =

Coordinates: 54°20′30″N 24°30′55″E

- Village
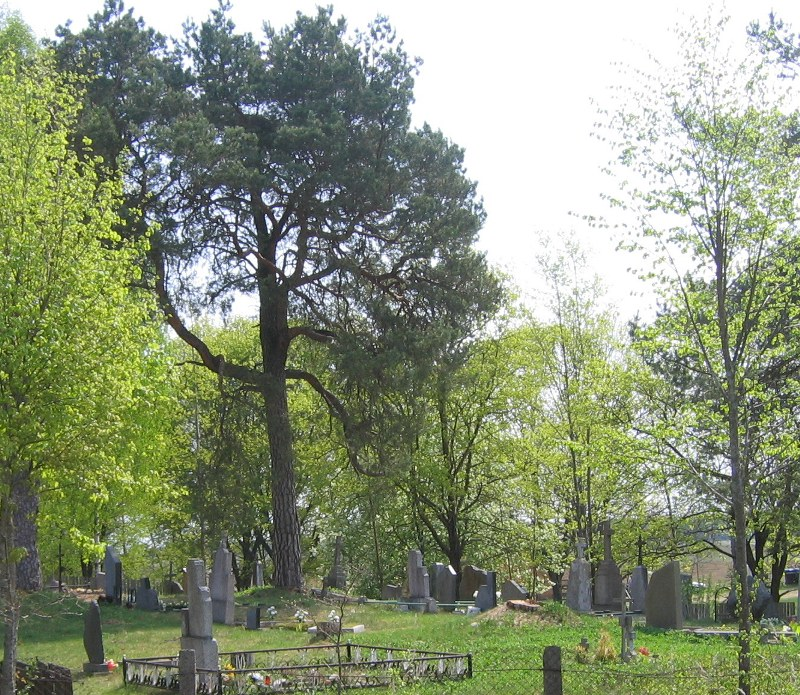
- Interactive map of Kirklionys
- Country: Lithuania
- County: Alytus County
- Municipality: Varėna

Population (2001)
  - Total: 3
- Time zone: UTC+2 (EET)
  - Summer (DST): UTC+3 (EEST)

Kirklionys is a village in Varėna district municipality, in Alytus County, in southeastern Lithuania. According to the 2001 census, the village has a population of 3 people.
