= Rūsingė =

- Village
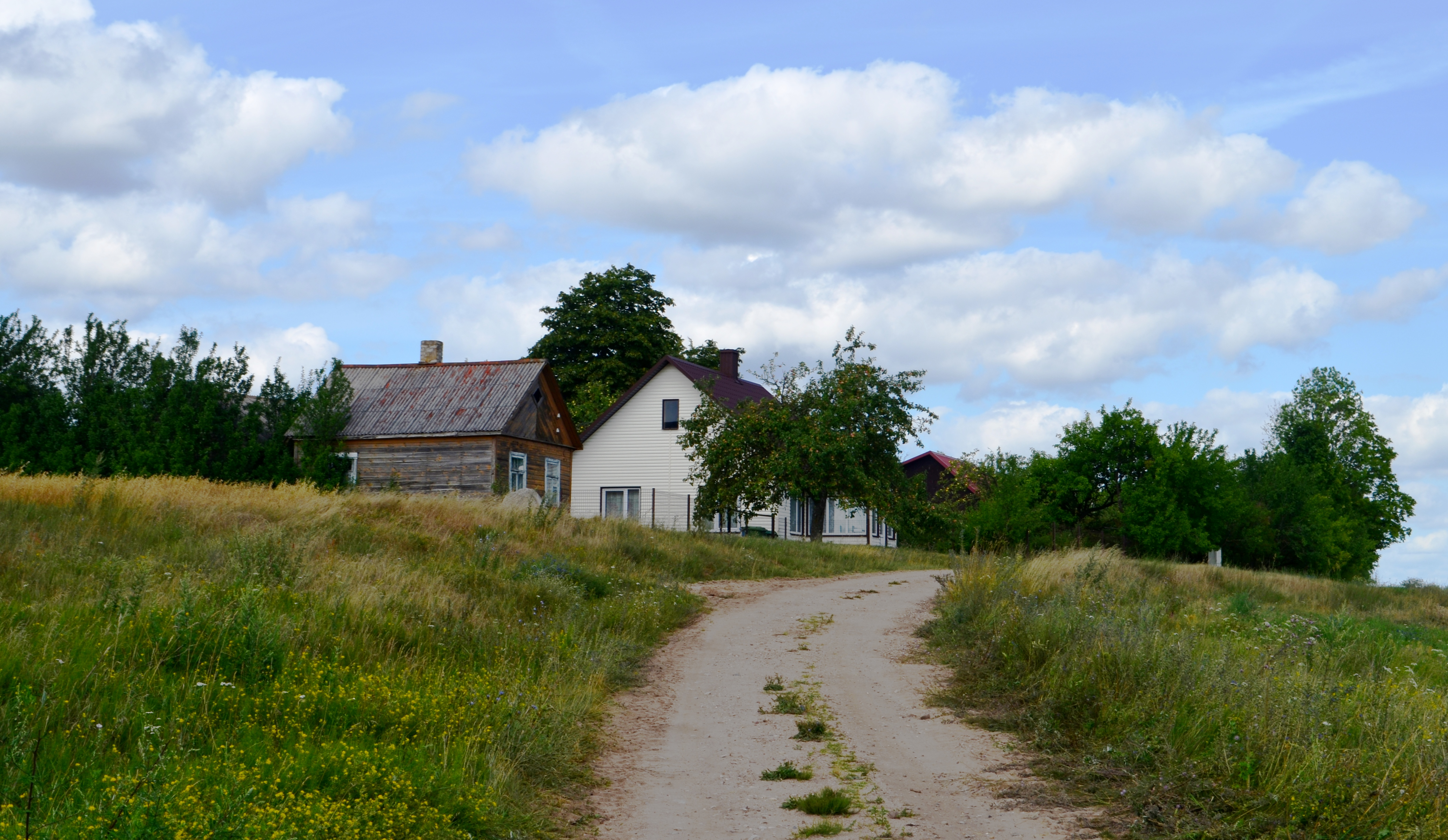

- Location within Lithuania
- Coordinates: 54°08′05″N 24°05′25″E
- Country: Lithuania
- County: Alytus County
- Municipality: Varėna district municipality
- Eldership: Merkinė eldership

Population (2001)
  - Total: 31
- Time zone: UTC+2 (EET)
  - Summer (DST): UTC+3 (EEST)

Rūsingė is a village in Varėna district municipality, in Alytus County, in southeastern Lithuania. According to the 2001 census, the village has a population of 31 people.
