= Kasčiūnai =

Coordinates: 54°06′40″N 24°16′08″E

- Village
- Interactive map of Kasčiūnai
- Country: Lithuania
- County: Alytus County
- Municipality: Varėna

Population (2001)
  - Total: 11
- Time zone: UTC+2 (EET)
  - Summer (DST): UTC+3 (EEST)

Kasčiūnai is a village in Varėna district municipality, in Alytus County, in southeastern Lithuania. According to the 2001 census, the village has a population of 11 people.
