= Voriškės =

Coordinates: 54°17′N 24°44′E

- Village
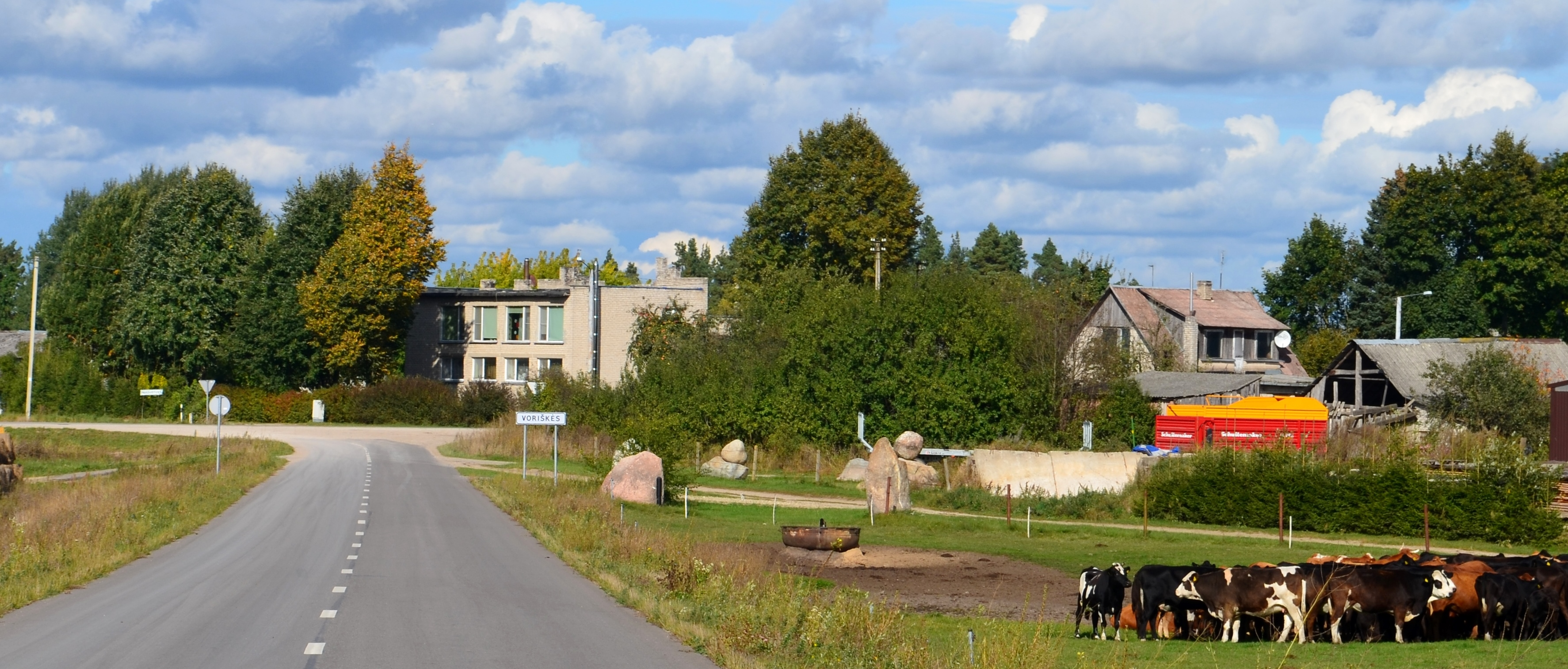
- Interactive map of Voriškės
- Country: Lithuania
- County: Alytus County
- Municipality: Varėna

Population (2001)
  - Total: 129
- Time zone: UTC+2 (EET)
  - Summer (DST): UTC+3 (EEST)

Voriškės is a village in Varėna district municipality, in Alytus County, in southeastern Lithuania(Latitude: 54° 16' 60.00" N and Longitude: 24° 43' 59.99" E)According to the 2001 census the village has a population of 129 people.
