= Mergežeris =

Coordinates: 54°12′N 24°31′E

Mergežerio
- Village
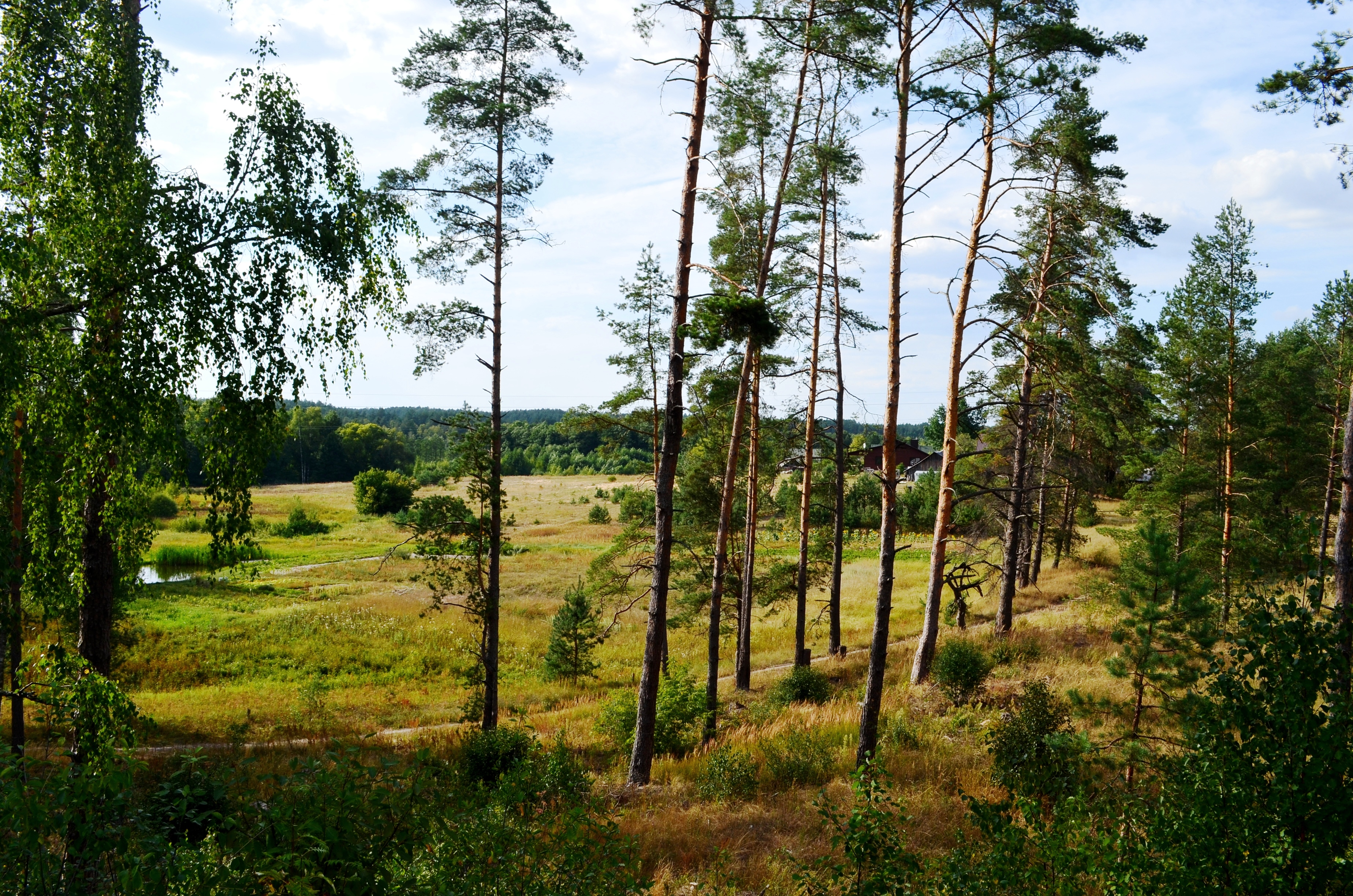
- Mergežeris Landscape
- Interactive map of Mergežerio
- Country: Lithuania
- County: Alytus County
- Municipality: Varėna

Population (2011)
  - Total: 30
- Time zone: UTC+2 (EET)
  - Summer (DST): UTC+3 (EEST)
- Website: https://mergazeris.lt/

Mergežeris is a village in Varėna district municipality, in Alytus County, in southeastern Lithuania. According to the 2011 census, the village has a population of 30 people.
