= Gudžiai =

Coordinates: 54°19′N 24°27′E

- Village
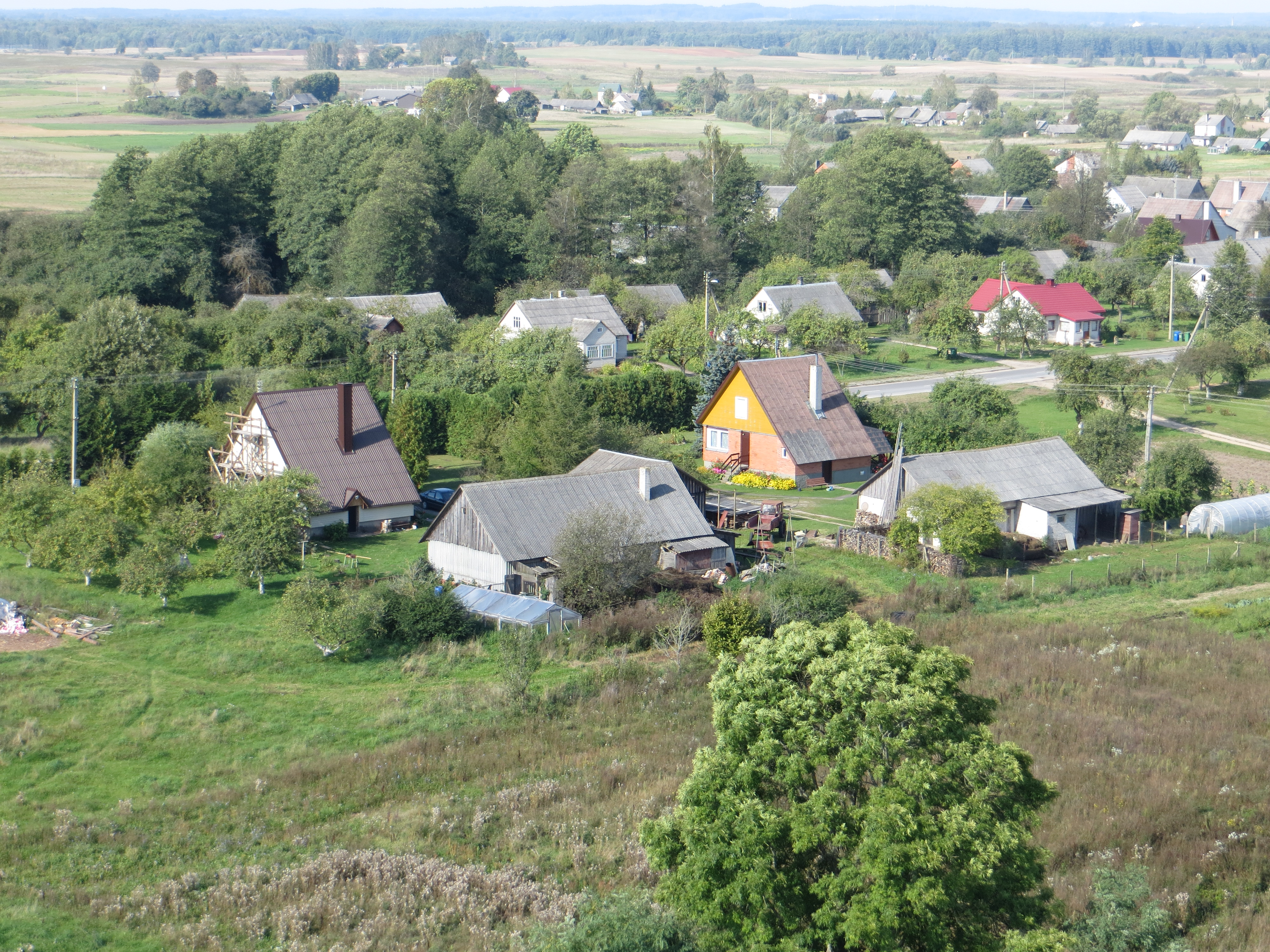
- Interactive map of Gudžiai
- Country: Lithuania
- County: Alytus County
- Municipality: Varėna

Population (2021)
  - Total: 294
- Time zone: UTC+2 (EET)
  - Summer (DST): UTC+3 (EEST)

Gudžiai is a village in Varėna district municipality, in Alytus County, in southeastern Lithuania. According to the 2001 census, the village has a population of 400 people.
