= Maksimonys (Varėna) =

- Village
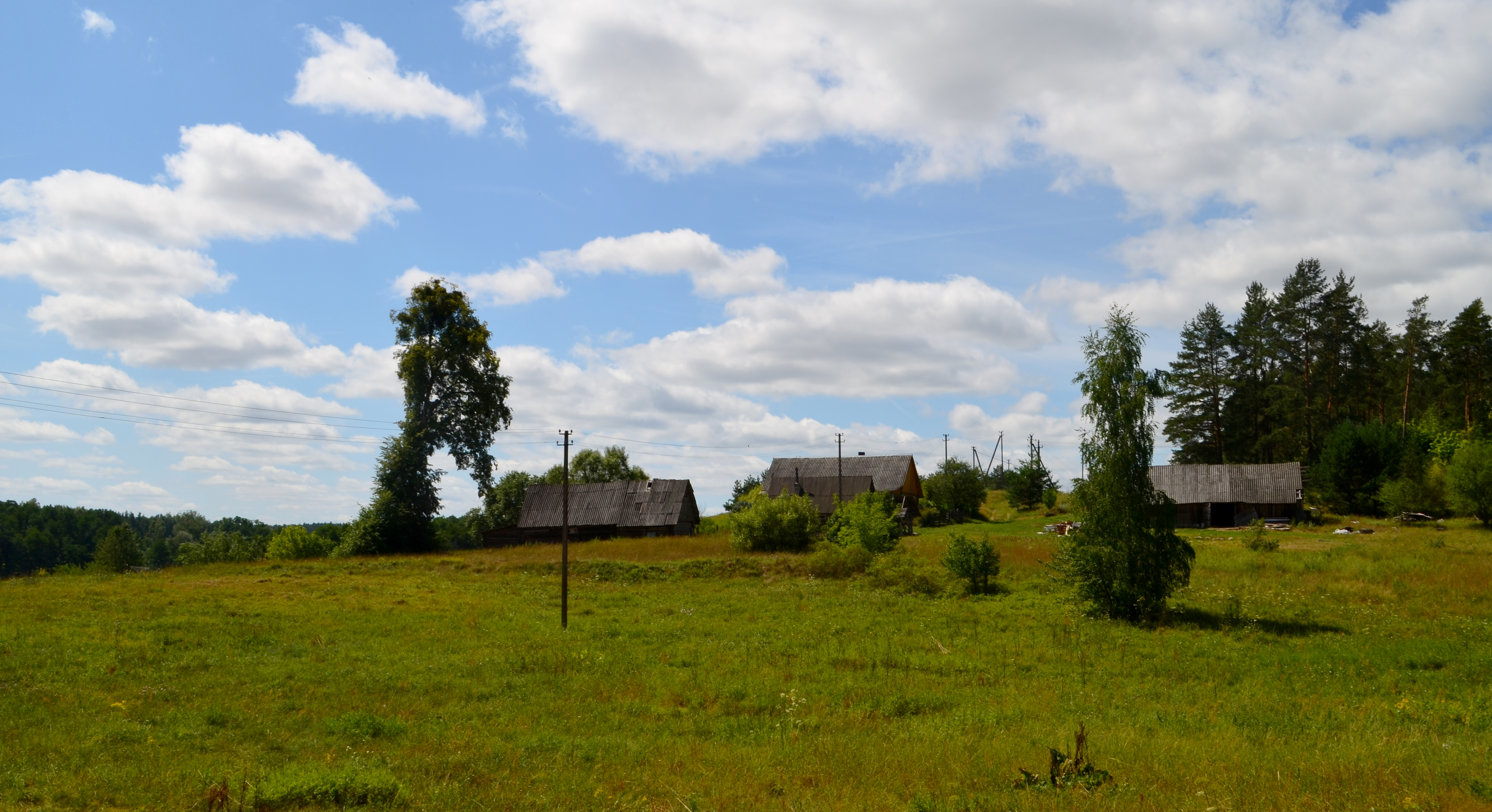

- Location within Varėna District Municipality Location within Lithuania
- Coordinates: 54°09′43″N 24°09′10″E
- Country: Lithuania
- County: Alytus County
- Municipality: Varėna

Population (2001)
  - Total: 23
- Time zone: UTC+2 (EET)
  - Summer (DST): UTC+3 (EEST)

Maksimonys (Varėna) is a village in Varėna district municipality, in Alytus County, in southeastern Lithuania. According to the 2001 census, the village has a population of 23 people.
