= Pūčkornės =

- Village
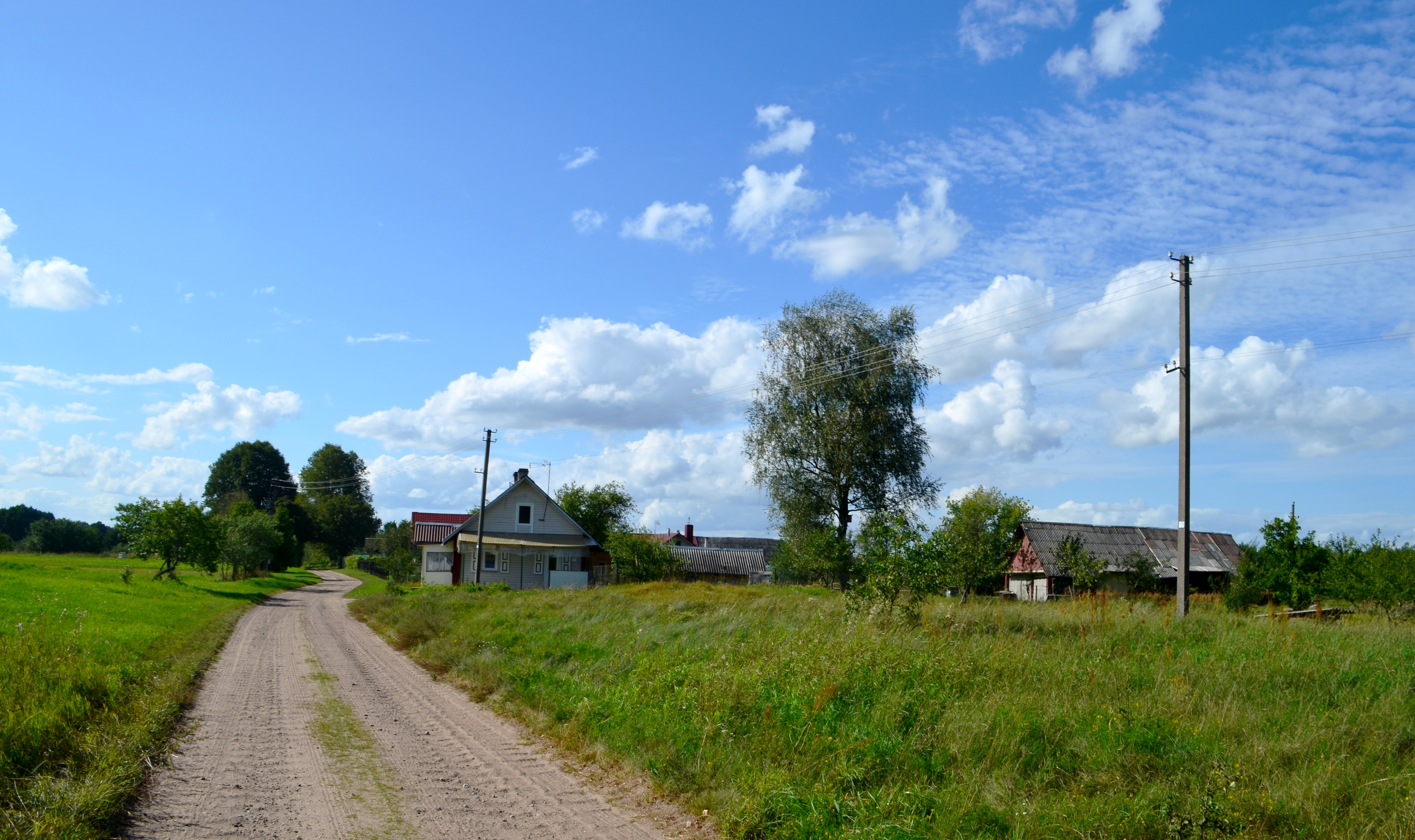

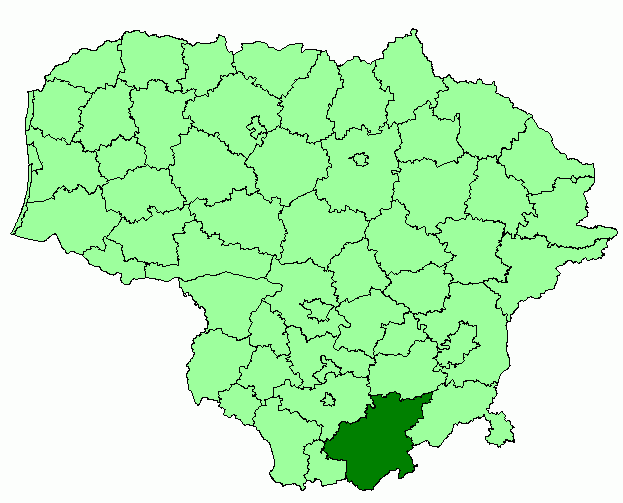
- Location in Varėna district municipality Location of Varėna district in Lithuania
- Coordinates: 54°21′50″N 24°45′58″E
- Country: Lithuania
- County: Alytus County
- Municipality: Varėna
- Eldership: Valkininkų (Valkininkai)

Population (2011 Census)
  - Total: 20
- Time zone: UTC+2 (EET)
  - Summer (DST): UTC+3 (EEST)

Pūčkornės is a village in Valkininkų (Valkininkai) eldership, Varėna district municipality, Alytus County, southeastern Lithuania. According to the 2001 census, the village has a population of 128 people. At the 2011 census, the population was 20.
