= Šarkiškės =

- Village
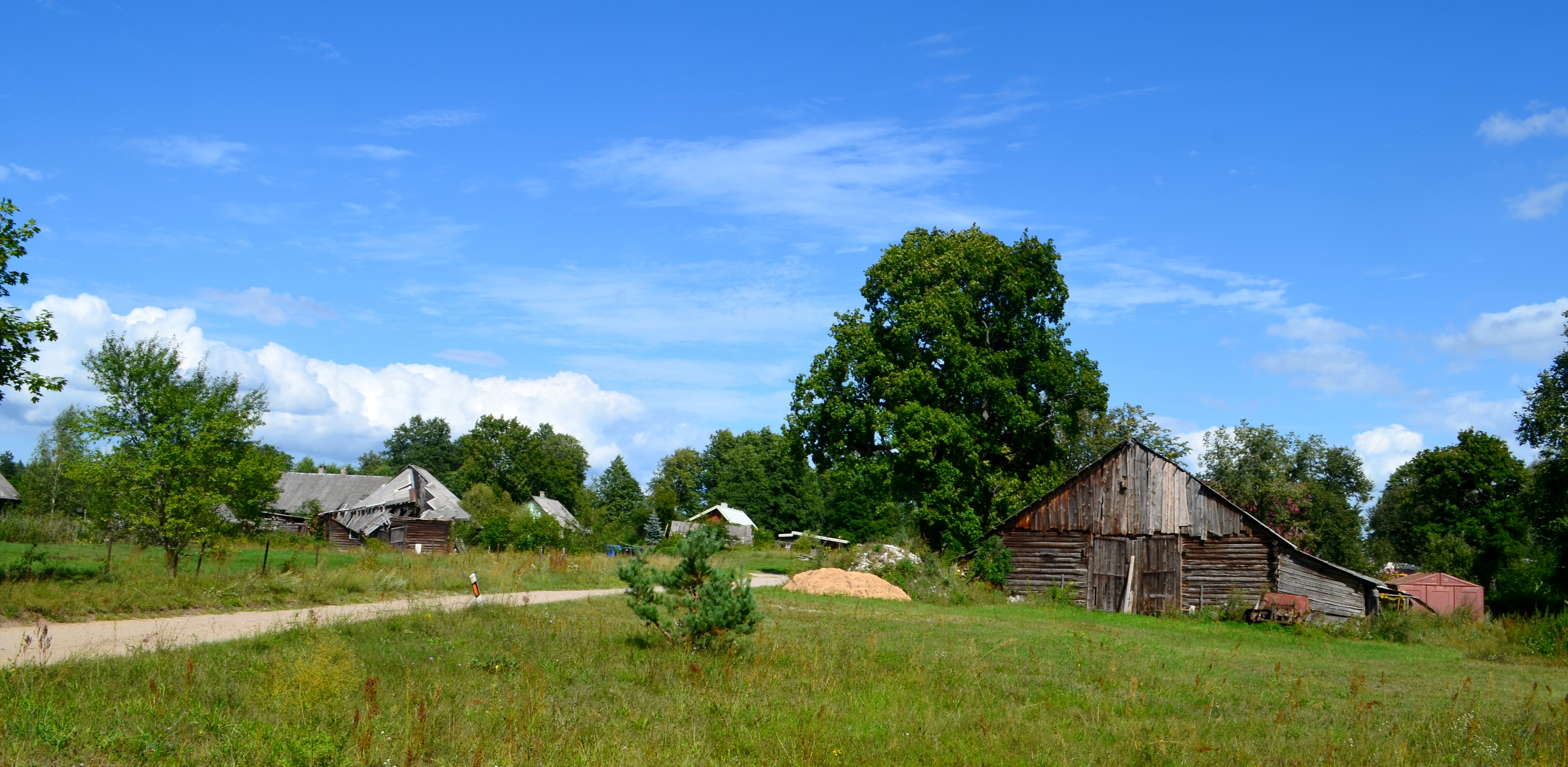

- Location in Lithuania
- Coordinates: 54°17′20″N 24°40′50″E
- Country: Lithuania
- County: Alytus County
- Municipality: Varėna district municipality
- Eldership: Matuizos eldership

Population (2001)
  - Total: 48
- Time zone: UTC+2 (EET)
  - Summer (DST): UTC+3 (EEST)

Šarkiškės is a village in Varėna district municipality, in Alytus County, southeastern Lithuania. According to the 2001 census, the village has a population of 48 people.
