= Pagilšys =

- Village
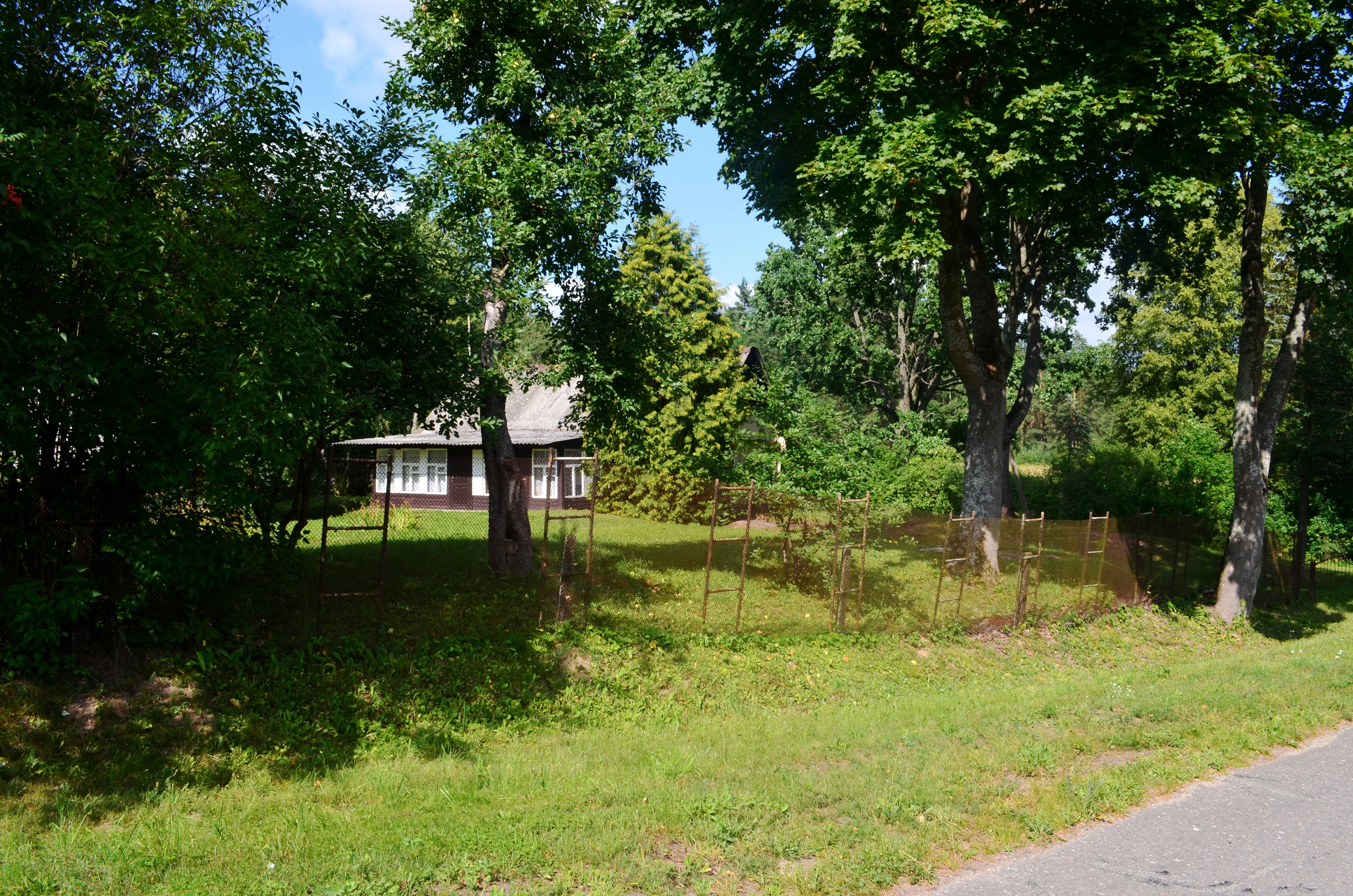

- Location within Lithuania
- Coordinates: 54°12′52″N 24°11′28″E
- Country: Lithuania
- County: Alytus County
- Municipality: Varėna District Municipality
- Eldership: Merkinė Eldership

Population (2011)
  - Total: 6
- Time zone: UTC+2 (EET)
  - Summer (DST): UTC+3 (EEST)

Pagilšys is a village in Varėna District Municipality, in Alytus County, in southeastern Lithuania.The village had a population of 11 people according to the 2001 census and 6 people according to the 2011 census.
