= Burokaraistis =

Coordinates: 54°12′40″N 24°19′58″E

- Village
- Interactive map of Burokaraistis
- Country: Lithuania
- County: Alytus County
- Municipality: Varėna

Population (2001)
  - Total: 59
- Time zone: UTC+2 (EET)
  - Summer (DST): UTC+3 (EEST)

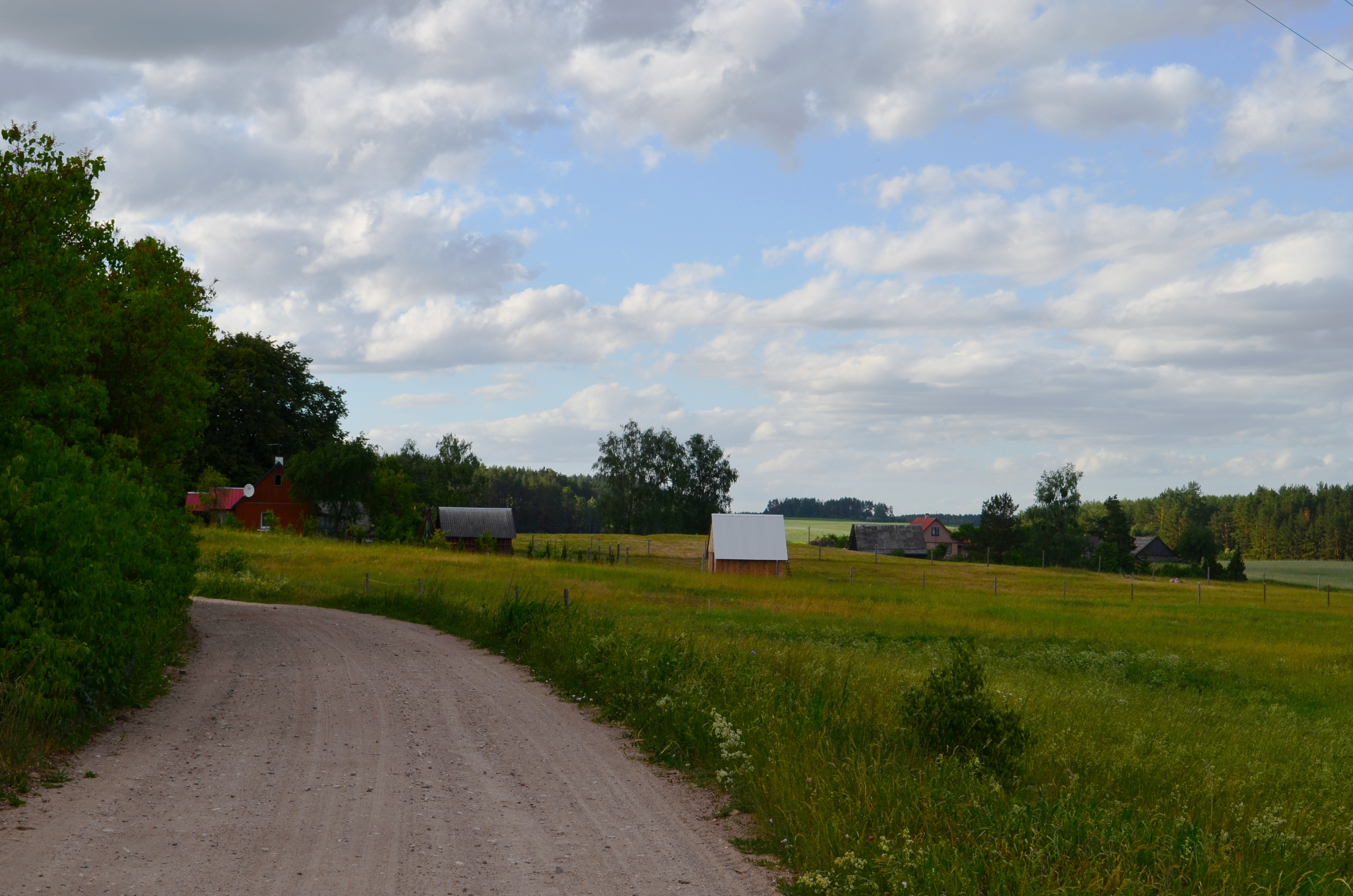

Burokaraistis is a village in Varėna district municipality, in Alytus County, in southeastern Lithuania. According to the 2001 census, the village has a population of 59 people.
