= Gudakiemis =

Coordinates: 54°12′20″N 24°14′40″E

- Village
- Interactive map of Gudakiemis
- Country: Lithuania
- County: Alytus County
- Municipality: Varėna

Population (2001)
  - Total: 170
- Time zone: UTC+2 (EET)
  - Summer (DST): UTC+3 (EEST)

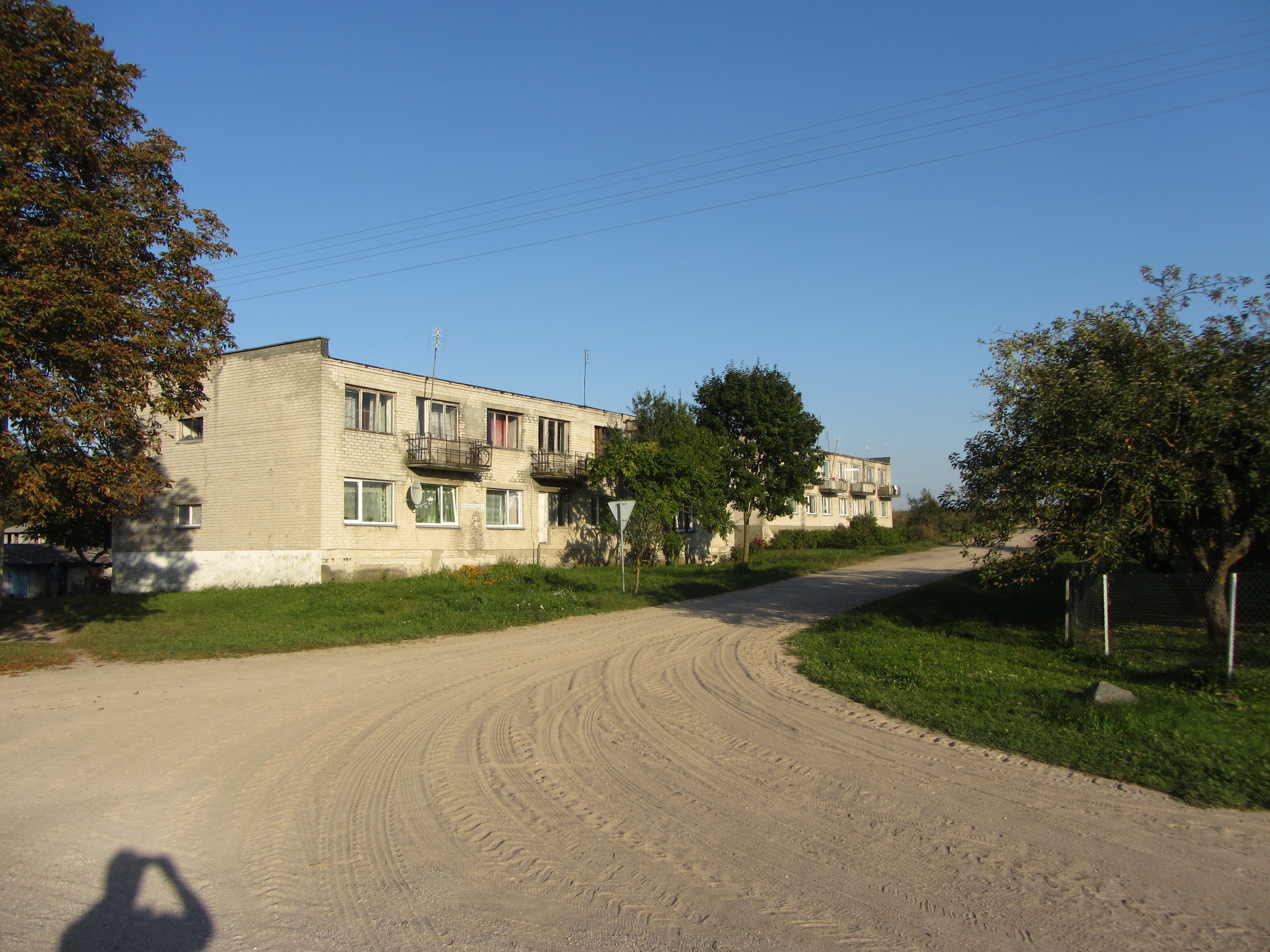

Gudakiemis is a village in Varėna district municipality, in Alytus County, in southeastern Lithuania. According to the 2001 census, the village has a population of 170 people.
