= Gudeliai (Varėna) =

Coordinates: 54°05′31″N 24°09′11″E

- Village
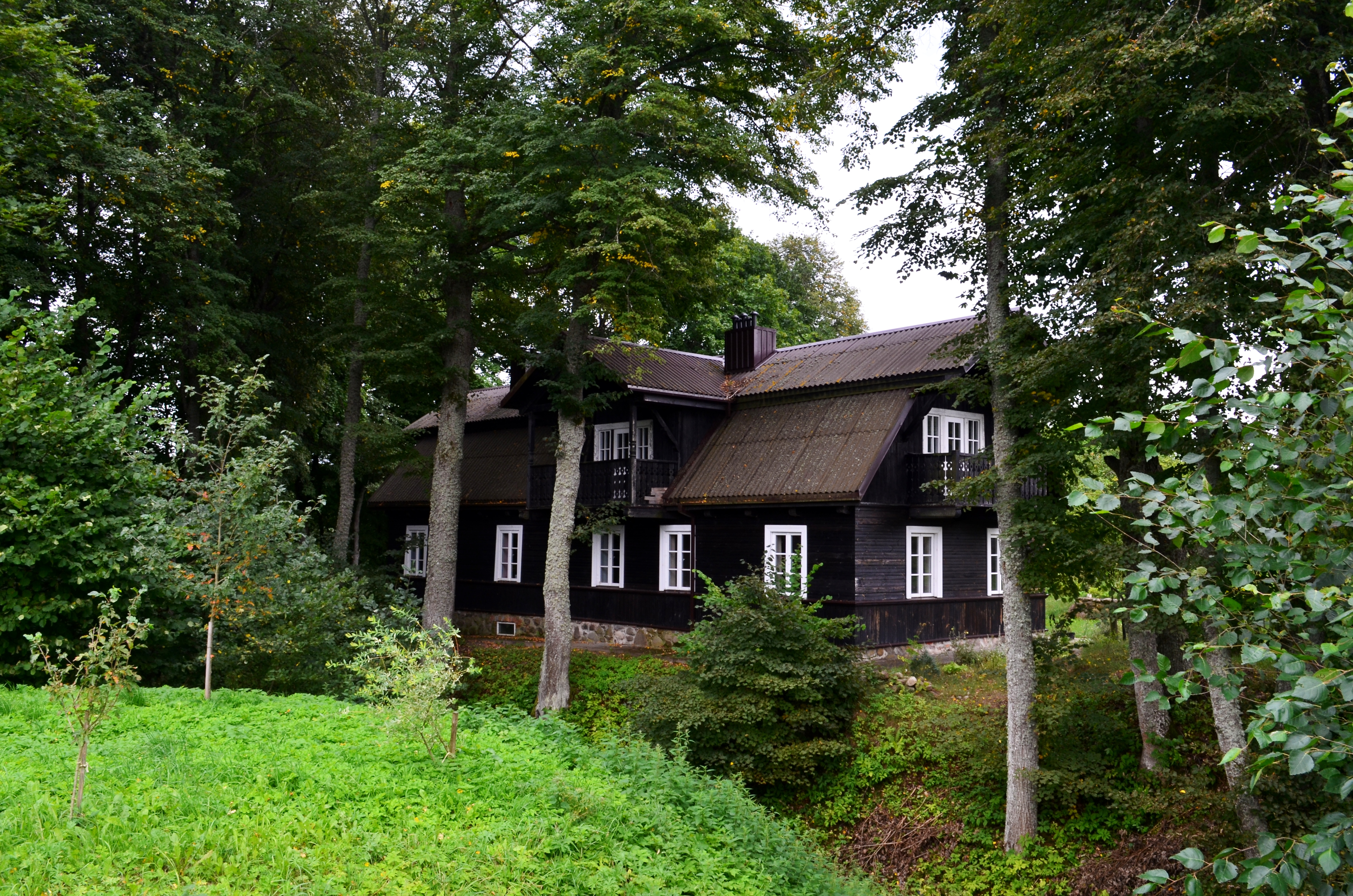
- Interactive map of Gudeliai (Varėna)
- Country: Lithuania
- County: Alytus County
- Municipality: Varėna

Population (2001)
  - Total: 13
- Time zone: UTC+2 (EET)
  - Summer (DST): UTC+3 (EEST)

Gudeliai (Varėna) is a village in Varėna district municipality, in Alytus County, in southeastern Lithuania. According to the 2001 census, the village has a population of 13 people.
