= Papiškės (Merkinė) =

- Village
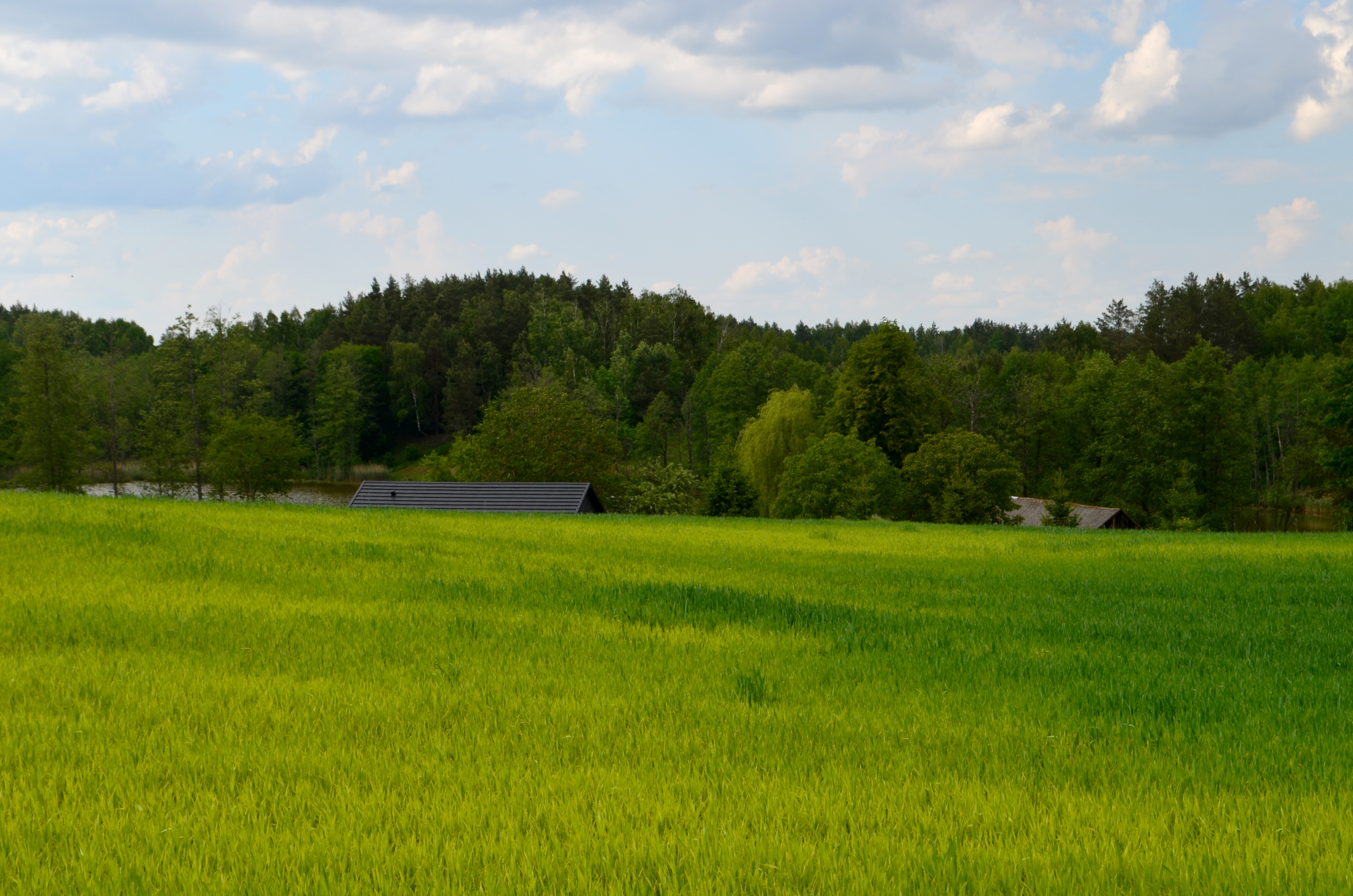
- Interactive map of Papiškės
- Location within Lithuania Location within Varėna District Municipality
- Coordinates: 54°07′22″N 24°01′58″E
- Country: Lithuania
- County: Alytus County
- Municipality: Varėna

Population (2001)
  - Total: 11
- Time zone: UTC+2 (EET)
  - Summer (DST): UTC+3 (EEST)

Papiškės (Merkinė) is a village in Varėna district municipality, in Alytus County, in southeastern Lithuania. According to the 2001 census, the village has a population of 11 people.
