= Varėna District Municipality =

Varėna District Municipality Varėnos rajono savivaldybė
- Municipality
- Flag Coat of arms Brandmark

- Location in Lithuania

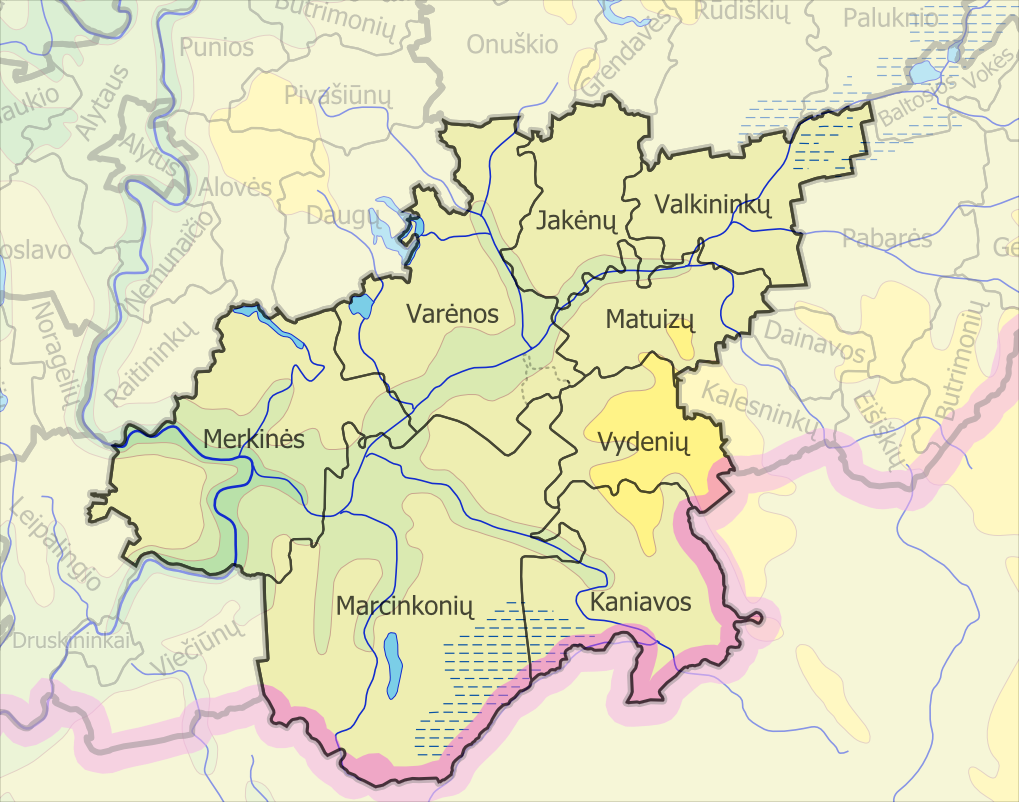
- Map of Varėna district municipality
- Coordinates: 54°13′N 24°34′E
- Country: Lithuania
- Ethnographic region: Dzūkija
- County: Alytus County
- Capital: Varėna
- Elderships: 8

Government
  - Type: City Council
  - Body: Varėna Council
  - Mayor: Algis Kašėta (PAC)
  - Leading: Political Committee 9 / 25

Area
  - Total: 2,218 km^{2} (856 sq mi)
  - Rank: 1st

Population (2024)
  - Total: 19,918
  - Rank: 41st
  - Density: 8.980/km^{2} (23.26/sq mi)
  - Rank: 60th
- Time zone: UTC+2 (EET)
  - Summer (DST): UTC+3 (EEST)
- Telephone code: 310
- Major settlements: Varėna (pop. 7,794)
- Website: www.varena.lt/en

Varėna District Municipality (Lithuanian: Varėnos rajono savivaldybė) is a municipality in Alytus County in southern Lithuania.

== History ==
Along with Vilnius region, a large part of Varėna District Municipality was on the Polish side of not-mutually recognized border during the interwar period. This was mainly due to the strategic Warsaw – Saint Petersburg Railway. Unlike in neighboring regions, where the number of Poles is high, the territories now comprising the municipality always had a Lithuanian majority. The Varėna District, as it was then called, was formed during the Soviet Union, with the small town of Varėna chosen as the capital. Varėna was chosen over the then much larger Senoji Varėna (literally "Old Varėna") as the capital, due to its proximity to a railroad. It only became the center of region in the 1970s when it underwent industrialization under Soviet leadership. During a municipality reform the territory was renamed to Varėna District Municipality and the westernmost parts of it ceded to Druskininkai Municipality.

== Geography ==
Most of the municipality is covered by forests and swamps, it is the largest and least densely populated municipality of Lithuania. It borders Druskininkai Municipality to the west, Alytus District Municipality to the northwest, Trakai District Municipality to the northeast, and Šalčininkai District Municipality also to the west. To the south it shares a border with Belarus.

The district is in the Nemunas Basin. The Nemunas itself passes by its western edge while the Merkys (with its tributaries Ūla, Grūda, Varėnė) is the main watercourse. There is the largest march in Lithuania the Čepkeliai March which is declared as a strict natural reserve. There are more than 100 lakes. Most of them are small, endorhetic, while some, like Ilgis, Nedingis, Lavysas, Glėbas, are larger.

68.9% of the district's territory is occupied by forests, mostly, by the Dainava Forest (ancient Hrodna Wood), the largest in the country. There are circa 40 nature monuments - old pine trees used for beekeeping, some outcrops, unique geological landforms.

The main part of the district is in the Dainava Plain. North-western side is covered by the Dzūkian Highland, while eastern side is in the Eišiškės Plateau where is the highest point of Varėna District Municipality - the Riliškiai Hill (193 m).

- Rivers: Nemunas, Merkys, Ūla, Varėnė, Grūda, Strauja, Katra.
- Lakes and ponds: Ilgis, Nedingis, Lavysas, Glėbas, Grūda Lake, Varėna 1st Reservoir.
- Marches: Čepkeliai March, Pastalikė March.
- Forests: Dainava Forest, Subartonys Forest.
- Protected areas: Dzūkija National Park, Čepkeliai Natural Reserve, Ūla Landscape Sanctuary, Merkys Ichtiological Sanctuary, Pelesa Botanical-Zoological Sanctuary, etc.

== Economics ==
Tourism is on rise, as Dzūkija National Park is located in the region. Also, forestry, construction materials, textile, food (milk) industry is being developed.

== Council ==
Varėna district municipality council currently has 25 seats. The last elections took place in December 2002, and the term limit is 4 years.
The results of the 2002 elections:

- Lithuanian Center Union - 18
- Christian Coalition with Algis Kašėta - 2
- Social Democratic Party of Lithuania - 2
- New Union Social Liberals - 2
- Liberal democrat party - 1

== Transportation ==
The road network is sparse, but a railway connects the district with Vilnius. There are stations in Valkininkai, Matuizos, Varėna, Marcinkonys, and stops in Kalviai, Pamerkiai, Zervynos, Darželiai, Margionys, Kabeliai, Senovė (the last three recently closed after the train route to Hrodna was discontinued).

== Elderships ==
Varėna District Municipality is divided into 8 elderships:

| Eldership | Area | Population (2021) | Population density (per km^{2}) |
|---|---|---|---|
| Jakėnai | 149 km^{2} (36,818.70 acres; 57.53 sq mi) | 957 | 6 |
| Kaniava | 263 km^{2} (64,988.72 acres; 101.54 sq mi) | 1,009 | 4 |
| Marcinkonys | 565 km^{2} (139,614.54 acres; 218.15 sq mi) | 1,021 | 2 |
| Matuizos | 148 km^{2} (36,571.60 acres; 57.14 sq mi) | 1,833 | 12 |
| Merkinė | 390 km^{2} (96,371.10 acres; 150.58 sq mi) | 2,552 | 6 |
| Valkininkai | 156 km^{2} (38,548.44 acres; 60.23 sq mi) | 1,572 | 10 |
| Varėna | 350 km^{2} (86,486.88 acres; 135.14 sq mi) | 11,084 | 32 |
| Vydeniai | 140 km^{2} (34,594.75 acres; 54.05 sq mi) | 1,109 | 8 |

== Population ==
=== Demography ===
Ethnic makeup (2011 census):

- Lithuanians - 22967 (90.5%)
- Poles - 1612 (6.35%)
- Russians - 307 (1.02%)
- Belarusians - 237 (0.93%)
- Others less than 0.5% each

=== Largest settlements ===
Largest cities or towns in Varėna District Municipality 2021 Lithuanian Census
| Rank | | Eldership | Pop. |
|---|---|---|---|
| 1 | Varėna | Varėna Eldership | 8202 |
| 2 | Matuizos | Matuizos Eldership | 1073 |
| 3 | Senoji Varėna | Varėna Eldership | 1073 |
| 4 | Merkinė | Merkinė Eldership | 963 |
| 5 | Marcinkonys | Marcinkonys Eldership | 493 |
| 6 | Perloja | Varėna Eldership | 484 |
| 7 | Naujieji Valkininkai | Valkininkai Eldership | 368 |
| 8 | Kriviliai | Vydeniai Eldership | 319 |
| 9 | Žilinai | Jakėnai Eldership | 315 |
| 10 | Gudžiai | Varėna Eldership | 294 |

== Population by locality ==
2011 Census
| Locality | Status | Total | Male | Female |
|---|---|---|---|---|
| Total | | 25,377 | 11,916 | 13,461 |
| Jakėnai Eldership | | 1,202 | 586 | 616 |
| Akmuo | K | 0 | 0 | 0 |
| Aukštakalnis | K | 11 | 7 | 4 |
| Barteliai | K | 18 | 8 | 10 |
| Bytautonys | K | 15 | 9 | 6 |
| Burbonys | K | 12 | 7 | 5 |
| Damononys | K | 12 | 8 | 4 |
| Ginakiemis | K | 15 | 8 | 7 |
| Gruožninkėliai | K | 0 | 0 | 0 |
| Jakėnai | K | 10 | 6 | 4 |
| Kalėnai | K | 17 | 10 | 7 |
| Kaniūkai | K | 35 | 15 | 20 |
| Kareivonys | K | 99 | 50 | 49 |
| Karpiškės | K | 13 | 6 | 7 |
| Kukliai | K | 33 | 19 | 14 |
| Laukiapušis | K | 0 | 0 | 0 |
| Maskauka | K | 22 | 12 | 10 |
| Miletonys | K | 0 | 0 | 0 |
| Norvydiškės | K | 2 | 1 | 1 |
| Paakmenė | K | 0 | 0 | 0 |
| Pabezninkai | K | 2 | 1 | 1 |
| Pajuodikys | K | 0 | 0 | 0 |
| Palielukis | K | 0 | 0 | 0 |
| Paručiai | K | 12 | 5 | 7 |
| Paspengliai | K | 0 | 0 | 0 |
| Petrauskai | K | 0 | 0 | 0 |
| Puodžiai | K | 322 | 150 | 172 |
| Radžiūnai | K | 4 | 2 | 2 |
| Salos | K | 8 | 3 | 5 |
| Strielčiškės | K | 6 | 4 | 2 |
| Užtilčiai | K | 10 | 6 | 4 |
| Vazgirdonys | K | 75 | 37 | 38 |
| Verbiciškės | K | 0 | 0 | 0 |
| Vergakiemis | K | 34 | 18 | 16 |
| Voniškės | K | 3 | 1 | 2 |
| Zakoriai | K | 0 | 0 | 0 |
| Žilinai | K | 392 | 184 | 208 |
| Žilinėliai | K | 20 | 9 | 11 |
| Kaniava Eldership | | 1,390 | 660 | 730 |
| Bagočiai | K | 12 | 5 | 7 |
| Balbutai | K | 39 | 15 | 24 |
| Būdos | K | 9 | 4 | 5 |
| Dalina | K | 16 | 6 | 10 |
| Daržininkai | K | 26 | 14 | 12 |
| Drucminai | K | 11 | 5 | 6 |
| Dubičiai | K | 291 | 146 | 145 |
| Gribaša | K | 7 | 4 | 3 |
| Grišoniškės | K | 0 | 0 | 0 |
| Jasauskai | K | 60 | 27 | 33 |
| Kalviai | K | 47 | 19 | 28 |
| Kaniava | K | 23 | 9 | 14 |
| Kaniavėlė | K | 14 | 8 | 6 |
| Kaniūkai | K | 36 | 23 | 13 |
| Karaviškės | K | 5 | 3 | 2 |
| Katra | K | 19 | 8 | 11 |
| Kaziukonys | K | 6 | 2 | 4 |
| Kašėtos | K | 15 | 8 | 7 |
| Krokšlys | K | 50 | 21 | 29 |
| Krukliai | K | 30 | 18 | 12 |
| Lynežeris | K | 24 | 9 | 15 |
| Mantotai | K | 16 | 5 | 11 |
| Margiai | K | 3 | 2 | 1 |
| Mikalčiūnai | K | 30 | 15 | 15 |
| Molinė | K | 4 | 1 | 3 |
| Noškūnai | K | 41 | 19 | 22 |
| Paąžuolė | K | 13 | 5 | 8 |
| Pakaniavys | K | 9 | 5 | 4 |
| Pakuliškės | K | 7 | 4 | 3 |
| Panočiai | K | 284 | 136 | 148 |
| Paramėlis | K | 20 | 7 | 13 |
| Pauosupė | K | 4 | 3 | 1 |
| Podubičiai | K | 3 | 0 | 3 |
| Prauda | K | 5 | 3 | 2 |
| Rakai | K | 114 | 53 | 61 |
| Rudnia | K | 74 | 35 | 39 |
| Stojai | K | 10 | 4 | 6 |
| Stoniūnai | K | 2 | 1 | 1 |
| Šiliniai | K | 0 | 0 | 0 |
| Šulai | K | 0 | 0 | 0 |
| Ūta | K | 11 | 8 | 3 |
| Marcinkonys Eldership | | 1,389 | 671 | 718 |
| Ašašninkai | K | 43 | 19 | 24 |
| Bižai | K | 1 | 0 | 1 |
| Darželiai | K | 63 | 25 | 38 |
| Daržinėlės | K | 22 | 9 | 13 |
| Dubas | K | 7 | 4 | 3 |
| Dubininkas | K | 4 | 3 | 1 |
| Grybaulia | K | 26 | 16 | 10 |
| Kabeliai | K | 168 | 83 | 85 |
| Kapiniškiai | K | 40 | 19 | 21 |
| Kašėtos | K | 14 | 5 | 9 |
| Lavysas | K | 2 | 1 | 1 |
| Mančiagirė | K | 15 | 10 | 5 |
| Marcinkonys | K | 640 | 310 | 330 |
| Mardasavas | K | 26 | 10 | 16 |
| Margionys | K | 58 | 30 | 28 |
| Musteika | K | 61 | 25 | 36 |
| Paūliai | K | 9 | 5 | 4 |
| Piesčiai | K | 0 | 0 | 0 |
| Pogarenda | K | 0 | 0 | 0 |
| Puvočiai | K | 57 | 31 | 26 |
| Randamonys | K | 0 | 0 | 0 |
| Rudnia | K | 1 | 1 | 0 |
| Senovė | K | 7 | 1 | 6 |
| Šklėriai | K | 41 | 24 | 17 |
| Trakiškiai | K | 7 | 2 | 5 |
| Viršurodukis | K | 4 | 2 | 2 |
| Zervynos | K | 47 | 25 | 22 |
| Žiūrai | K | 26 | 11 | 15 |
| Matuizos Eldership | | 2,229 | 1,084 | 1,145 |
| Beržupis | VS | 18 | 11 | 7 |
| Biekšios | K | 21 | 8 | 13 |
| Burneikos | VS | 0 | 0 | 0 |
| Butvydonys | K | 50 | 23 | 27 |
| Čebatoriai | K | 87 | 44 | 43 |
| Giniūnai | K | 22 | 11 | 11 |
| Giraitė | K | 61 | 31 | 30 |
| Jakėnai | K | 17 | 8 | 9 |
| Jurgiškės | K | 59 | 30 | 29 |
| Krūminiai | K | 174 | 88 | 86 |
| Kukiškės | K | 2 | 1 | 1 |
| Likonys | K | 0 | 0 | 0 |
| Marijanavas | K | 6 | 4 | 2 |
| Matuizos | K | 1,201 | 561 | 640 |
| Mielupiai | K | 11 | 6 | 5 |
| Moliai | K | 7 | 2 | 5 |
| Pabaronė | K | 10 | 6 | 4 |
| Pamerkiai | K | 87 | 43 | 44 |
| Papiškės | K | 29 | 16 | 13 |
| Pasgrinda | K | 34 | 16 | 18 |
| Paversekis | K | 41 | 25 | 16 |
| Semoškos | VS | 4 | 2 | 2 |
| Smalninkai | VS | 2 | 2 | 0 |
| Šarkiškės | K | 48 | 30 | 18 |
| Šlaitas | K | 10 | 7 | 3 |
| Urkionys | K | 125 | 59 | 66 |
| Voriškės | K | 103 | 50 | 53 |
| Žagariai | K | 0 | 0 | 0 |
| Merkinė Eldership | | 3,222 | 1,514 | 1,708 |
| Apsingė | K | 7 | 3 | 4 |
| Aušrinė | K | 7 | 5 | 2 |
| Bingeliai | K | 10 | 4 | 6 |
| Burokaraistėlė | K | 7 | 2 | 5 |
| Burokaraistis | K | 17 | 9 | 8 |
| Česukai | K | 6 | 3 | 3 |
| Degsnės | K | 2 | 1 | 1 |
| Dubaklonis | K | 39 | 12 | 27 |
| Dvaralaukis | K | 0 | 0 | 0 |
| Gelovinė | K | 1 | 1 | 0 |
| Geniai | K | 14 | 10 | 4 |
| Giraitė | K | 1 | 0 | 1 |
| Gudakiemis | K | 123 | 63 | 60 |
| Gudaraistis | K | 0 | 0 | 0 |
| Gudeliai | K | 10 | 6 | 4 |
| Ilgininkai | K | 96 | 47 | 49 |
| Jablanavas | K | 0 | 0 | 0 |
| Jakubiškiai | K | 43 | 23 | 20 |
| Janauka | K | 9 | 4 | 5 |
| Jonionys | K | 48 | 24 | 24 |
| Kačingė | K | 3 | 2 | 1 |
| Kaibūčiai | K | 3 | 1 | 2 |
| Kamintiškės | K | 0 | 0 | 0 |
| Kampai | K | 19 | 9 | 10 |
| Kasčiūnai | K | 7 | 4 | 3 |
| Kibyšiai | K | 146 | 68 | 78 |
| Krušonys | K | 0 | 0 | 0 |
| Kudrėnai | K | 18 | 9 | 9 |
| Kurmiškė | K | 6 | 2 | 4 |
| Kučiūnai | K | 2 | 1 | 1 |
| Lankininkai | K | 5 | 2 | 3 |
| Laukininkai | K | 16 | 7 | 9 |
| Laukininkėliai | K | 8 | 4 | 4 |
| Lemkaraistis | K | 9 | 5 | 4 |
| Lesagūrai | K | 5 | 4 | 1 |
| Levūnai | K | 0 | 0 | 0 |
| Liškiava | K | 57 | 29 | 28 |
| Maksimai | K | 9 | 5 | 4 |
| Maksimonys | K | 22 | 8 | 14 |
| Mantvilai | K | 15 | 6 | 9 |
| Mardasavas | K | 17 | 10 | 7 |
| Masališkės | K | 37 | 17 | 20 |
| Merkinė | MST | 1,228 | 559 | 669 |
| Merkinė | VS | 17 | 10 | 7 |
| Mikniūnai | K | 23 | 11 | 12 |
| Milioniškės | K | 19 | 7 | 12 |
| Navasodai | K | 5 | 1 | 4 |
| Navikai | K | 4 | 2 | 2 |
| Netiesos | K | 10 | 4 | 6 |
| Noruliai | K | 28 | 14 | 14 |
| Pagilšys | K | 6 | 2 | 4 |
| Pagronyčys | K | 11 | 6 | 5 |
| Panara | K | 213 | 107 | 106 |
| Papiškės | K | 8 | 3 | 5 |
| Parudnia | K | 5 | 1 | 4 |
| Paulenka | K | 0 | 0 | 0 |
| Pašilingė | K | 0 | 0 | 0 |
| Pelekiškė | K | 1 | 0 | 1 |
| Pilvingiai | K | 172 | 90 | 82 |
| Purpliai | K | 2 | 1 | 1 |
| Puvočiai | K | 5 | 3 | 2 |
| Radyščius | K | 44 | 22 | 22 |
| Raitininkai | K | 6 | 4 | 2 |
| Roduka | K | 13 | 5 | 8 |
| Rudnia | K | 2 | 0 | 2 |
| Rūsingė | K | 23 | 8 | 15 |
| Samūniškės | K | 35 | 14 | 21 |
| Sarkajiedai | K | 4 | 1 | 3 |
| Savulkos | K | 14 | 7 | 7 |
| Spyriai | K | 4 | 1 | 3 |
| Subartonys | K | 45 | 20 | 25 |
| Sukarepka | K | 27 | 13 | 14 |
| Šunupis | K | 17 | 8 | 9 |
| Tetervinė | K | 11 | 7 | 4 |
| Trasninkas | K | 4 | 3 | 1 |
| Ulčičiai | K | 2 | 1 | 1 |
| Utieka | K | 5 | 2 | 3 |
| Vaičiškė | VS | 5 | 1 | 4 |
| Valakėliai | K | 0 | 0 | 0 |
| Vilkiautinis | K | 288 | 130 | 158 |
| Voverys | K | 0 | 0 | 0 |
| Zakavoliai | K | 11 | 6 | 5 |
| Žeimiai | K | 61 | 30 | 31 |
| Valkininkai Eldership | | 1,932 | 915 | 1,017 |
| Čižiūnai | K | 129 | 65 | 64 |
| Dargužiai | K | 252 | 129 | 123 |
| Daržininkai | K | 40 | 18 | 22 |
| Degsnės | K | 66 | 33 | 33 |
| Kuršiai | K | 54 | 26 | 28 |
| Maceliai | K | 20 | 10 | 10 |
| Naujieji Valkininkai | K | 370 | 157 | 213 |
| Naujosios Naniškės | K | 49 | 26 | 23 |
| Paklėštarė | K | 150 | 69 | 81 |
| Pirčiupiai | K | 75 | 32 | 43 |
| Pošalčiai | K | 51 | 25 | 26 |
| Pūčkornės | K | 20 | 7 | 13 |
| Senosios Naniškės | K | 41 | 22 | 19 |
| Spengla | K | 39 | 18 | 21 |
| Užuperkasis | K | 343 | 178 | 165 |
| Vaitakarčmis | K | 4 | 1 | 3 |
| Valkininkai | MST | 229 | 99 | 130 |
| Varėna Eldership | | 12,628 | 5,817 | 6,811 |
| Aleksandrava | K | 1 | 0 | 1 |
| Andriūnai | K | 18 | 11 | 7 |
| Arčiūnai | K | 1 | 0 | 1 |
| Babriškės | K | 16 | 6 | 10 |
| Biniūnai | K | 11 | 4 | 7 |
| Diržamenys | K | 4 | 3 | 1 |
| Druckūnai | K | 89 | 41 | 48 |
| Dubaklonis | K | 4 | 2 | 2 |
| Dvarčiai | K | 10 | 5 | 5 |
| Ežeriekai | K | 13 | 5 | 8 |
| Geidukonys | K | 39 | 19 | 20 |
| Genionys | K | 20 | 7 | 13 |
| Girežeris | K | 6 | 3 | 3 |
| Glūkas | K | 7 | 4 | 3 |
| Gojus | K | 0 | 0 | 0 |
| Grumiškės | K | 0 | 0 | 0 |
| Gudžiai | K | 348 | 172 | 176 |
| Karužai | K | 14 | 6 | 8 |
| Kazimieravas | K | 30 | 20 | 10 |
| Kirklionys | K | 6 | 3 | 3 |
| Kucakiemis | K | 12 | 6 | 6 |
| Laičiai | K | 27 | 13 | 14 |
| Martinava | K | 4 | 1 | 3 |
| Mergežeris | K | 30 | 15 | 15 |
| Meškučiai | K | 3 | 1 | 2 |
| Miguičionys | K | 9 | 3 | 6 |
| Milioniškė | K | 22 | 9 | 13 |
| Moliadugnis | K | 5 | 3 | 2 |
| Nedzingė | K | 244 | 120 | 124 |
| Padaugė | K | 23 | 12 | 11 |
| Pagirės | K | 7 | 4 | 3 |
| Pakaršys | K | 45 | 21 | 24 |
| Pamusėliai | K | 35 | 13 | 22 |
| Pamusiai | K | 62 | 28 | 34 |
| Panedingys | K | 9 | 6 | 3 |
| Papiškiai | K | 22 | 9 | 13 |
| Pavardaunys | K | 10 | 5 | 5 |
| Pavarėnis | K | 3 | 0 | 3 |
| Perloja | K | 586 | 277 | 309 |
| Rudnia | K | 3 | 1 | 2 |
| Salovartė | K | 18 | 10 | 8 |
| Sapiegiškė | K | 11 | 5 | 6 |
| Sarapiniškės | K | 160 | 76 | 84 |
| Senoji Varėna | K | 1,203 | 571 | 632 |
| Slabodka | K | 11 | 7 | 4 |
| Sokonys | K | 2 | 1 | 1 |
| Tolkūnai | K | 158 | 80 | 78 |
| Ūta | K | 14 | 7 | 7 |
| Vadėnai | K | 10 | 7 | 3 |
| Varėna | M | 9,240 | 4,192 | 5,048 |
| Vartavalakis | K | 2 | 2 | 0 |
| Vilgučiai | K | 0 | 0 | 0 |
| Želniūnai | K | 1 | 1 | 0 |
| Žilinčiškės | K | 0 | 0 | 0 |
| Vydeniai Eldership | | 1,385 | 669 | 716 |
| Aladauka | K | 0 | 0 | 0 |
| Aladiškės | K | 5 | 3 | 2 |
| Barčiai | K | 148 | 70 | 78 |
| Cibonys | K | 4 | 1 | 3 |
| Čepelūnai | K | 9 | 5 | 4 |
| Dainava | K | 66 | 33 | 33 |
| Dipiškės | K | 4 | 2 | 2 |
| Gojus | K | 16 | 6 | 10 |
| Gumbiškės | K | 0 | 0 | 0 |
| Juočiai | K | 8 | 3 | 5 |
| Kalėdonys | K | 0 | 0 | 0 |
| Kamaraučiškės | K | 5 | 3 | 2 |
| Kamorūnai | K | 37 | 19 | 18 |
| Kijučiai | K | 165 | 84 | 81 |
| Kijutiškės | K | 18 | 11 | 7 |
| Kriviliai | K | 358 | 177 | 181 |
| Melekonys | K | 3 | 1 | 2 |
| Meškadonys | K | 0 | 0 | 0 |
| Milvyda | K | 6 | 1 | 5 |
| Palkabalis | K | 16 | 6 | 10 |
| Papiškės | K | 39 | 20 | 19 |
| Pavainikės | K | 0 | 0 | 0 |
| Pikiškės | K | 1 | 1 | 0 |
| Puišys | K | 0 | 0 | 0 |
| Ramonai | K | 0 | 0 | 0 |
| Ramoniškiai | K | 0 | 0 | 0 |
| Razumna | K | 25 | 15 | 10 |
| Riliškiai | K | 25 | 15 | 10 |
| Senkonys | K | 0 | 0 | 0 |
| Strėžiūnai | K | 50 | 28 | 22 |
| Ulbinai | K | 3 | 1 | 2 |
| Vaidagai | K | 0 | 0 | 0 |
| Vydeniai | K | 374 | 164 | 210 |
| Žukonys | K | 0 | 0 | 0 |

- Status: M - city; MST - town; K, GST - village; VS - homestead
