= Vydeniai Eldership =

Vydeniai Eldership Vydenių seniūnija
- Eldership
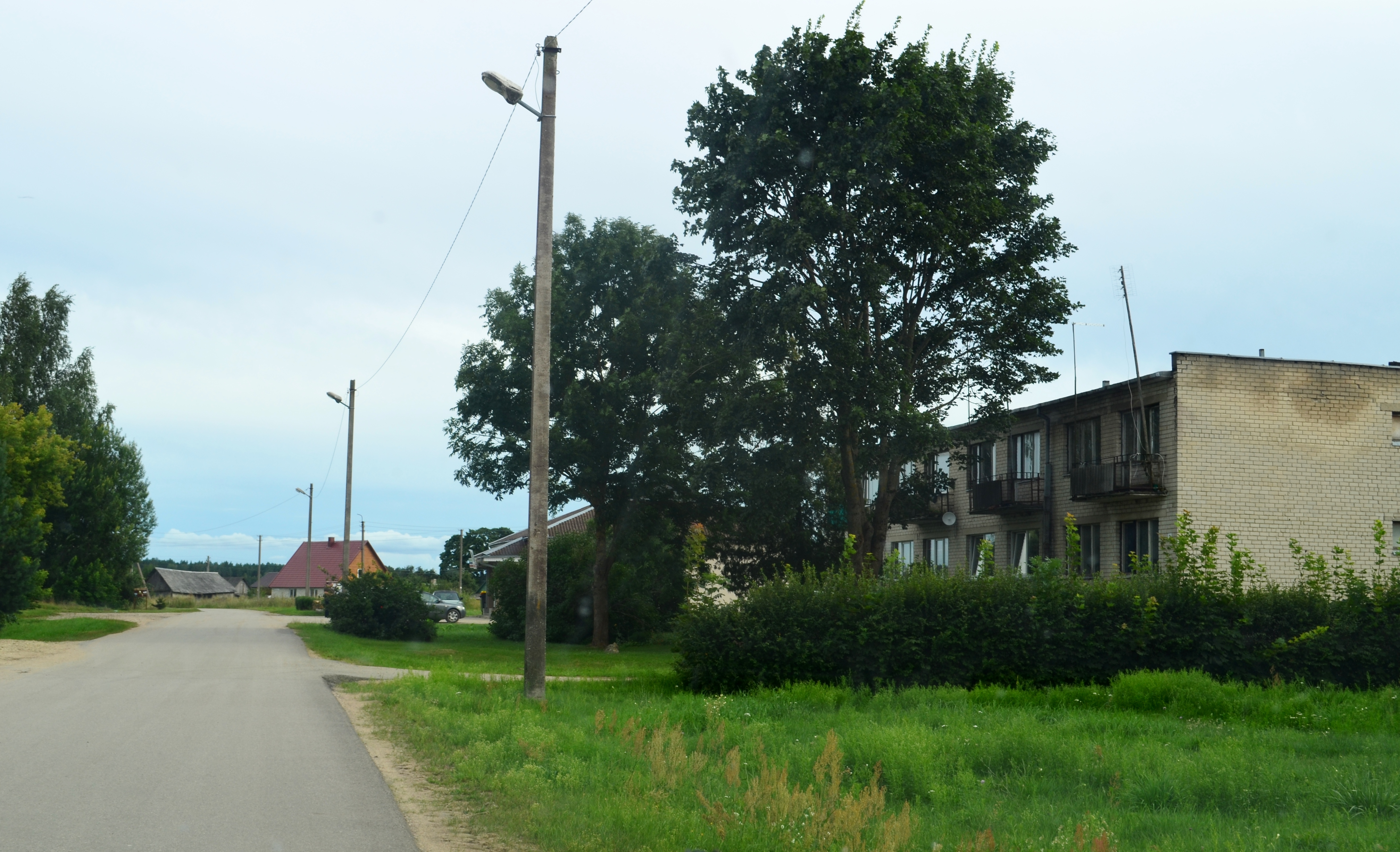
- Street of Vydeniai

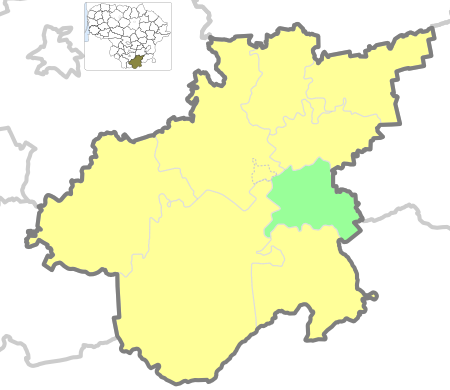
- Location of Vydeniai Eldership
- Coordinates: 54.179°N 24.698°E
- Country: Lithuania
- Ethnographic region: Dzūkija
- County: Alytus County
- Municipality: Varėna District Municipality
- Administrative centre: Vydeniai

Area
  - Total: 140 km^{2} (54 sq mi)

Population (2021)
  - Total: 1,109
  - Density: 7.9/km^{2} (21/sq mi)
- Time zone: UTC+2 (EET)
  - Summer (DST): UTC+3 (EEST)

Vydeniai Eldership (Lithuanian: Vydenių seniūnija) is a Lithuanian eldership, located in the eastern part of Varėna District Municipality.
