= Aladiškės =

- Village
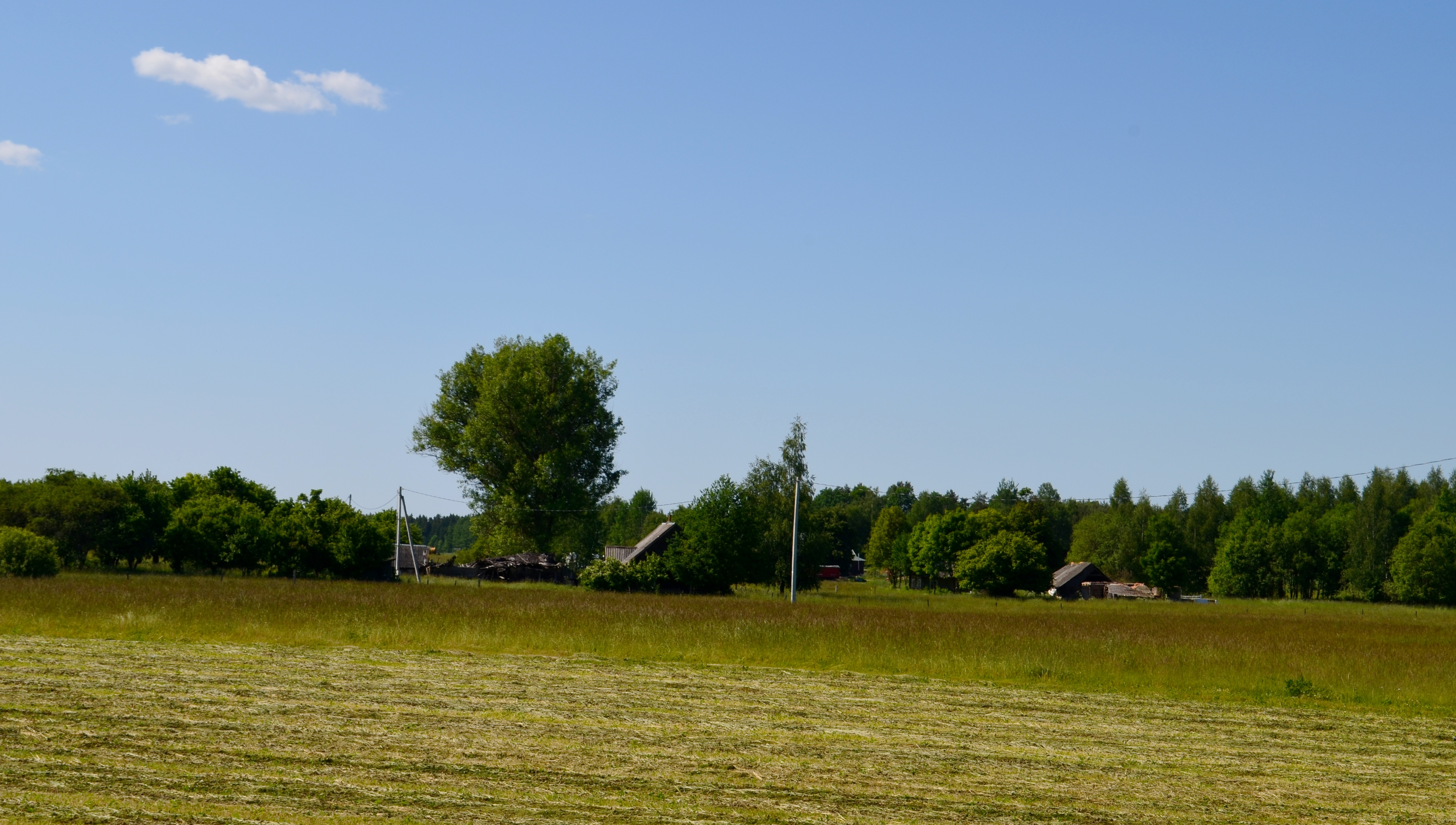

- Location within Lithuania
- Coordinates: 54°09′08″N 24°48′34″E
- Country: Lithuania
- County: Alytus County
- Municipality: Varėna district municipality
- Eldership: Vydeniai eldership

Population (2001)
  - Total: 11
- Time zone: UTC+2 (EET)
  - Summer (DST): UTC+3 (EEST)

Aladiškės is a village in Varėna district municipality, in Alytus County, in southeastern Lithuania. According to the 2001 census, the village has a population of 11 people.
