= Urkionys =

Village in Lithuania

- Village
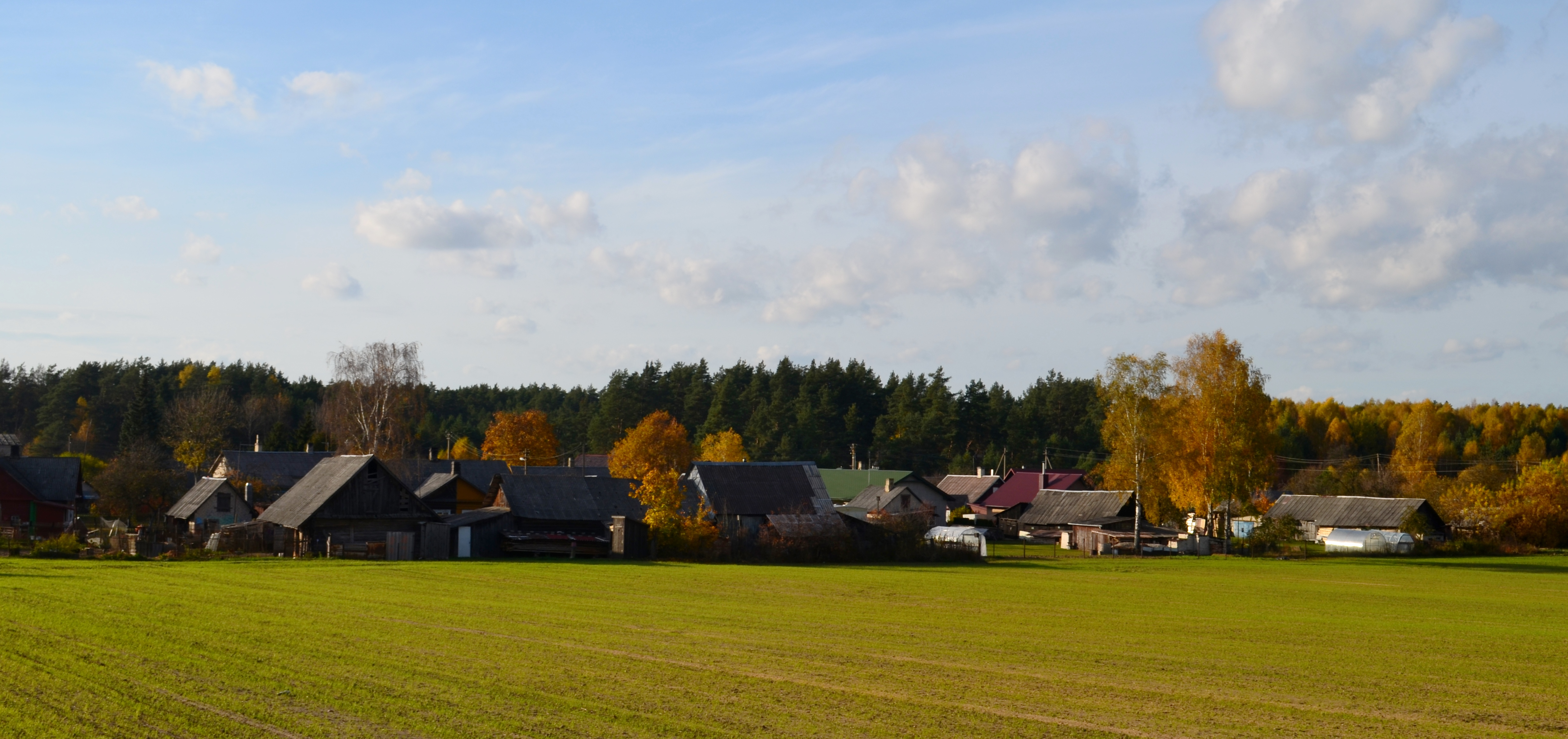

- Location within Lithuania
- Coordinates: 54°18′N 24°47′E
- Country: Lithuania
- County: Alytus County
- Municipality: Varėna

Population (2001)
  - Total: 129
- Time zone: UTC+2 (EET)
  - Summer (DST): UTC+3 (EEST)

Urkionys is a village in Varėna district municipality, in Alytus County, in southeastern Lithuania. According to the 2001 census, the village has a population of 129 people.
