= Vilkiautinis =

- Village
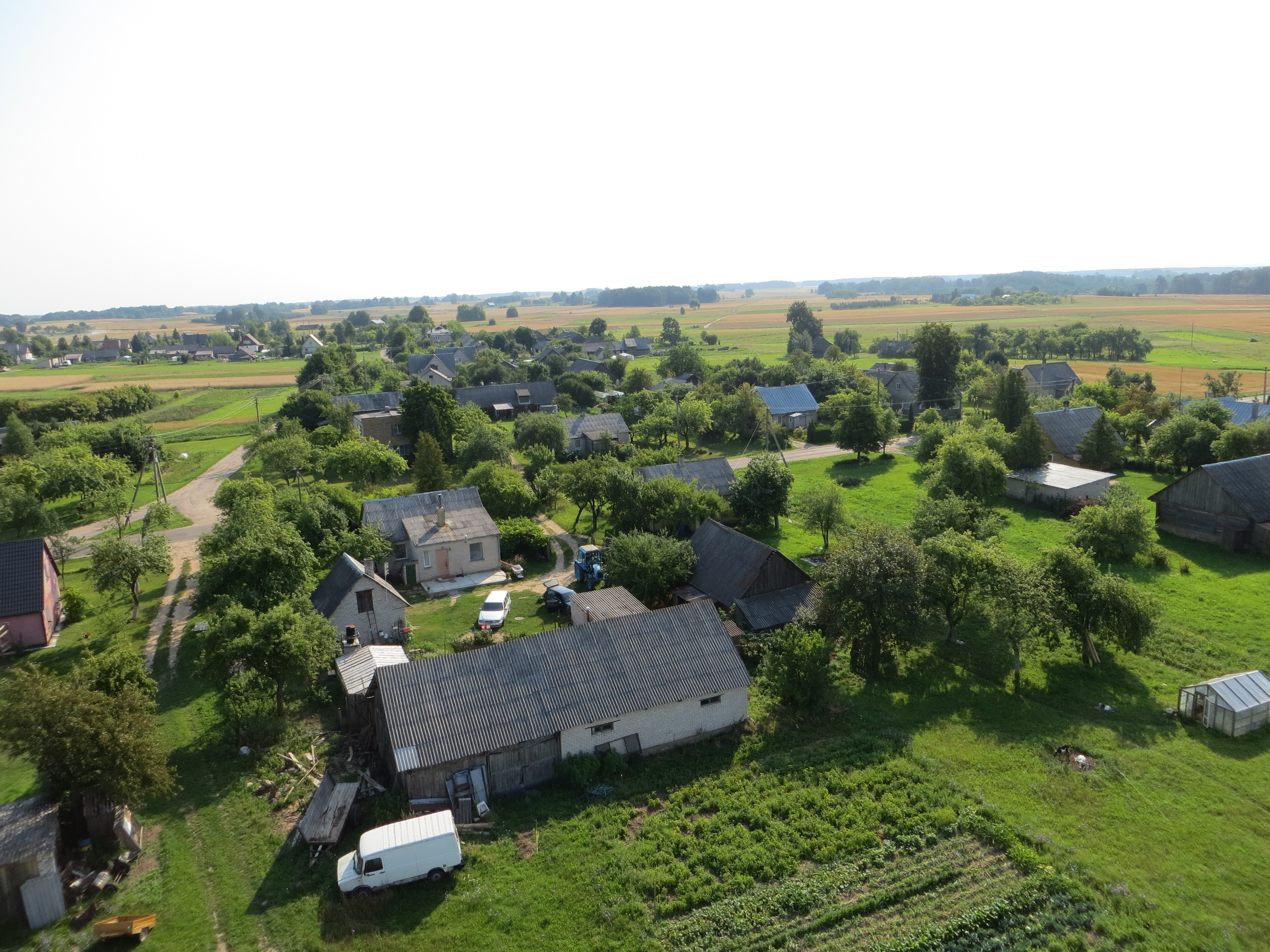

- Location within Varėna District Municipality Location within Lithuania
- Coordinates: 54°07′N 24°01′E
- Country: Lithuania
- County: Alytus County
- Municipality: Varėna

Population (2011)
  - Total: 288
- Time zone: UTC+2 (EET)
  - Summer (DST): UTC+3 (EEST)

Vilkiautinis is a village in Varėna district municipality, in Alytus County, in southeastern Lithuania. According to the 2001 census, the village has a population of 353 people.
