= Pabezninkai =

- Village
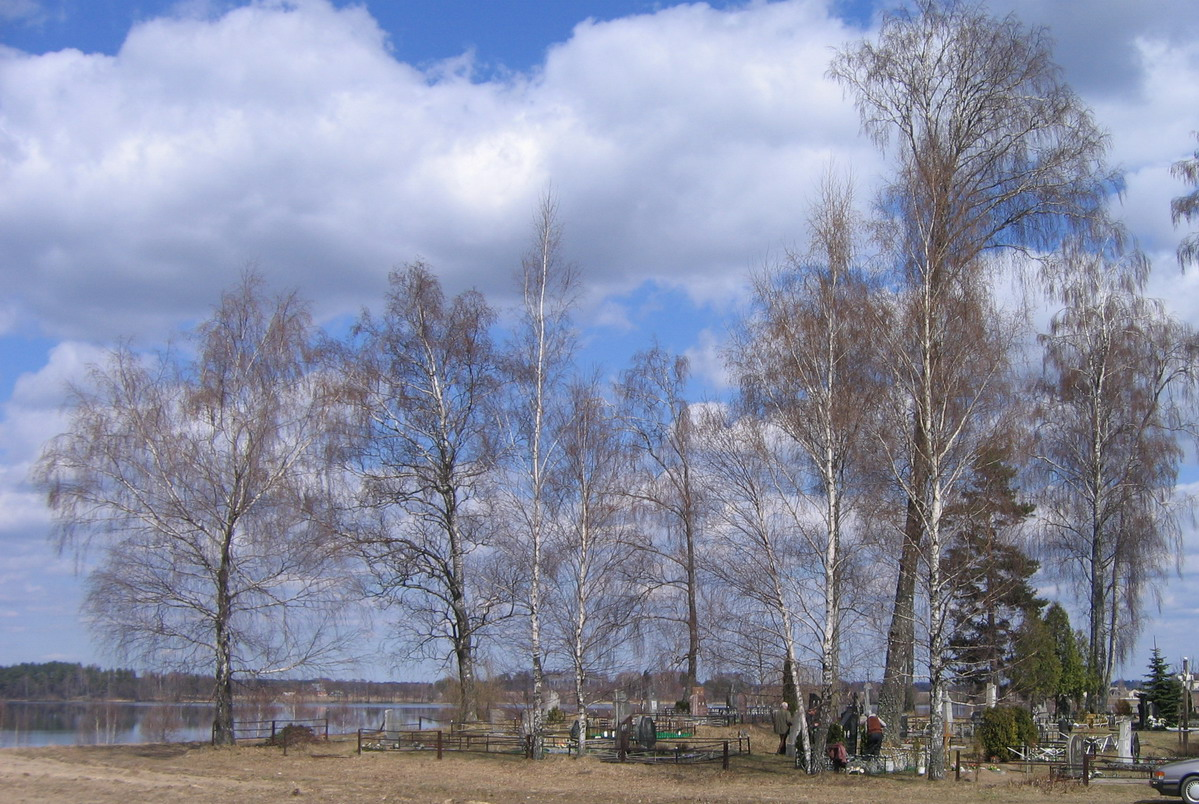

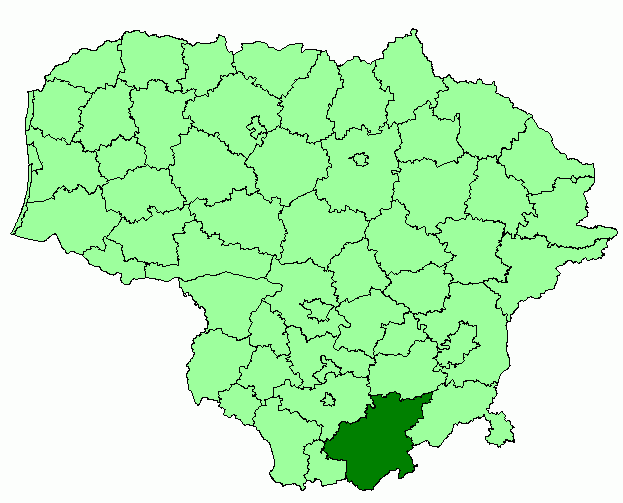
- Location in Varėna district municipality Location of Varėna district in Lithuania
- Coordinates: 54°20′49″N 24°33′22″E
- Country: Lithuania
- County: Alytus County
- Municipality: Varėna
- Eldership: Jakėnų (Jakėnai)

Population (2011 Census)
  - Total: 2
- Time zone: UTC+2 (EET)
  - Summer (DST): UTC+3 (EEST)

Pabezninkai is a village in Jakėnų eldership, Varėna district municipality, Alytus County, southeastern Lithuania. According to the 2001 census, the village had a population of 6 people. At the 2011 census, the population was 2.
