= Andriūnai (Varėna) =

Coordinates: 55°37′N 23°40′E

- Village
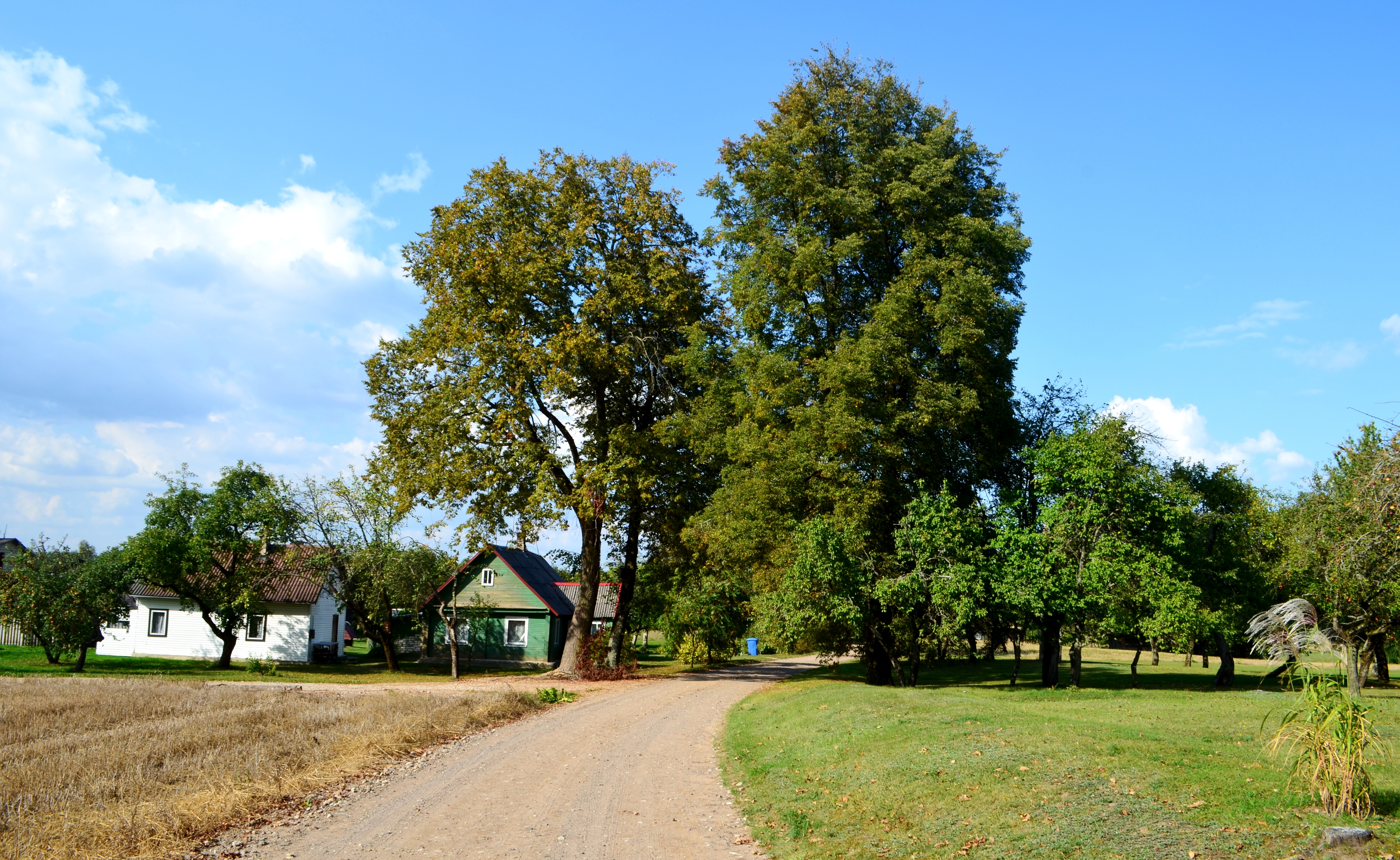
- Interactive map of Andriūnai
- Country: Lithuania
- County: Alytus County
- Municipality: Varėna

Population (2001)
  - Total: 22
- Time zone: UTC+2 (EET)
  - Summer (DST): UTC+3 (EEST)

Andriūnai is a village in Varėna district municipality, in Alytus County, in southeastern Lithuania. According to the 2001 census, the village has a population of 22 people.
