= Kriviliai =

Coordinates: 54°09′N 24°47′E

- Village
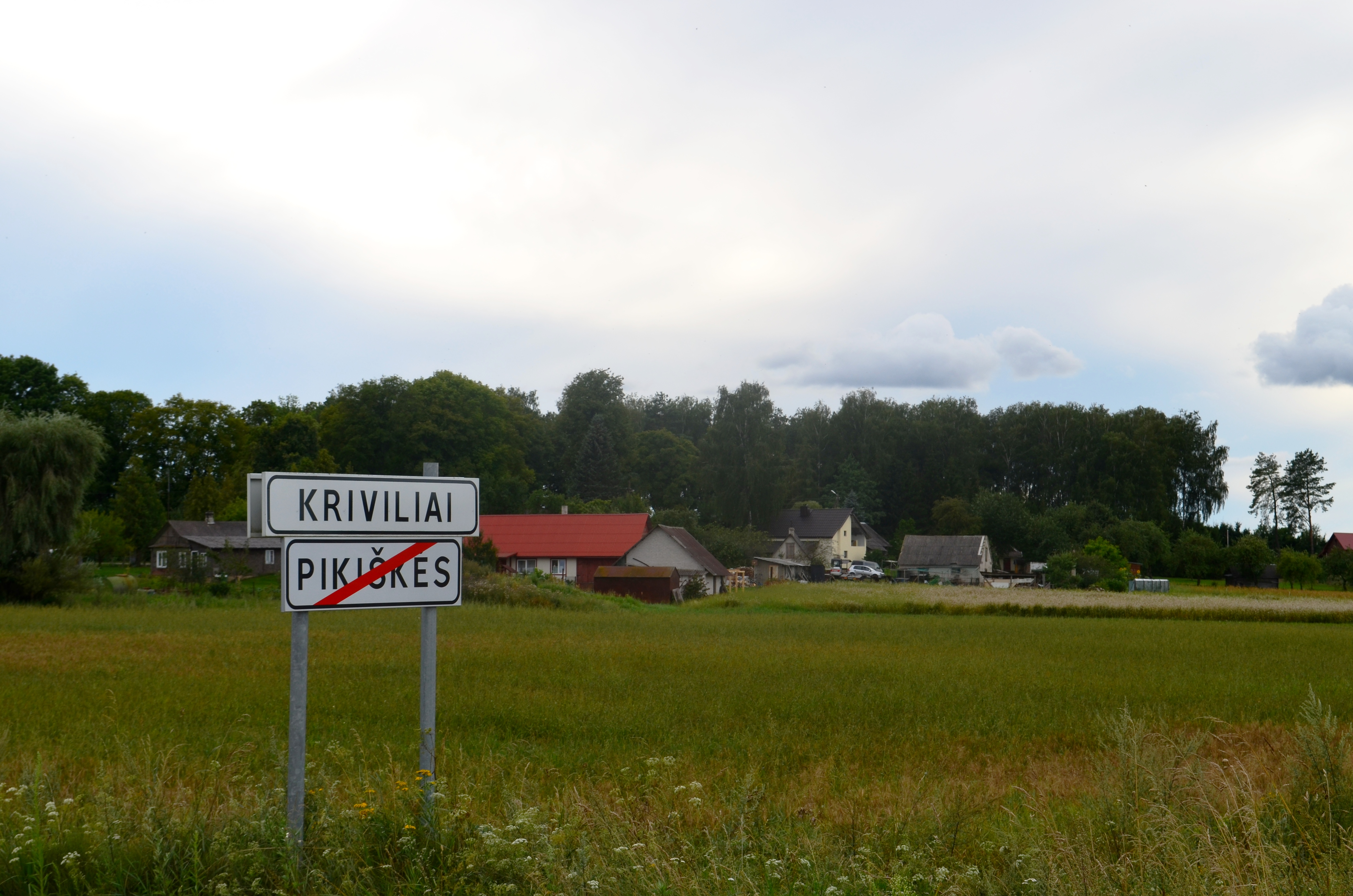
- Interactive map of Kriviliai
- Country: Lithuania
- County: Alytus County
- Municipality: Varėna district municipality

Population (2021)
  - Total: 319
- Time zone: UTC+2 (EET)
  - Summer (DST): UTC+3 (EEST)

Kriviliai is a village in Varėna district municipality, in Alytus County, in southeastern Lithuania. According to the 2001 census, the village has a population of 421 people.
