= Meteliai Regional Park =

Regional park in Lithuania

Coordinates: 54.28°N 23.72°E

- IUCN category V (protected landscape/seascape)
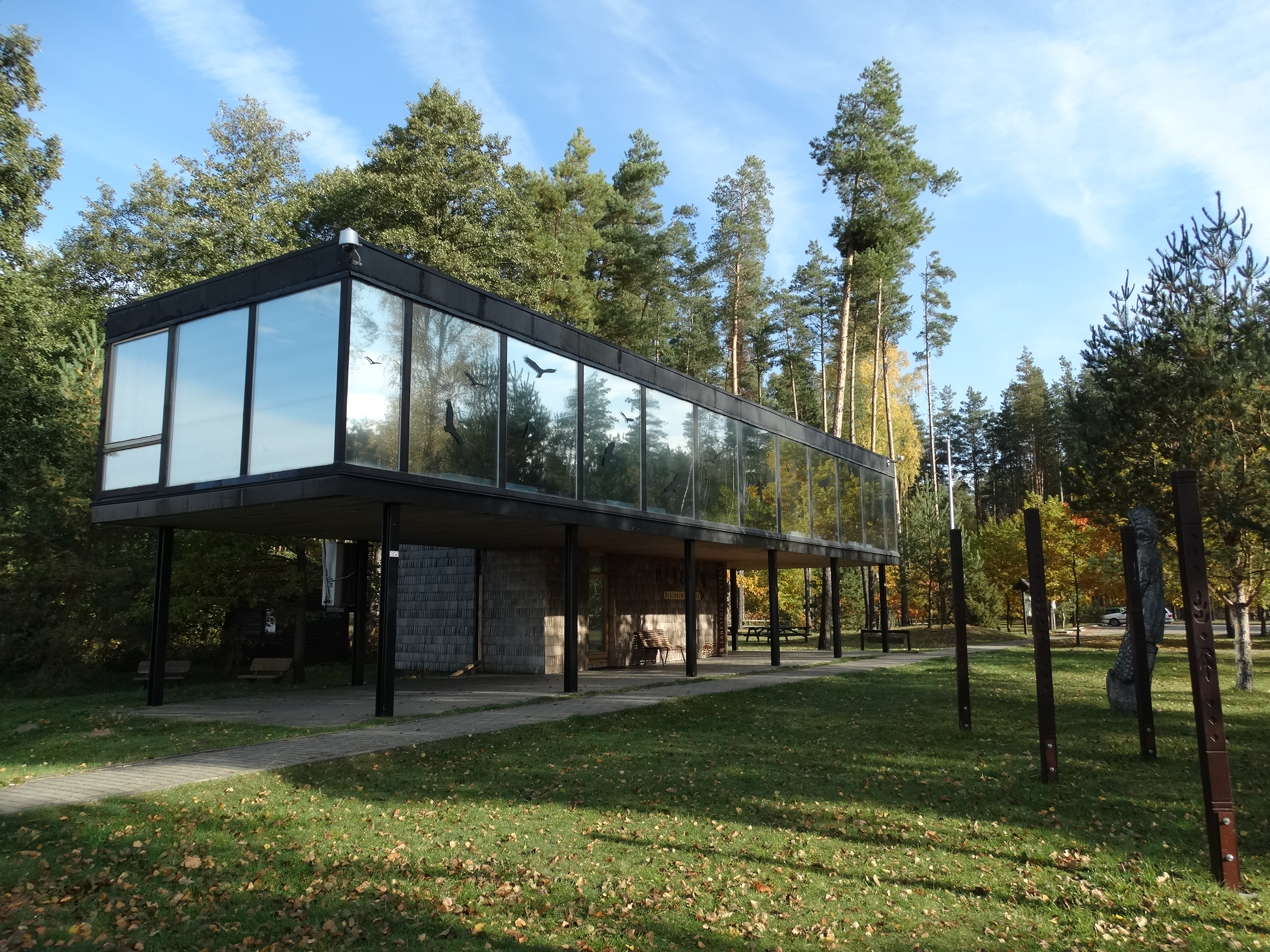
- Visitor center
- Location: Alytus County, Lithuania
- Nearest city: Lazdijai
- Area: 17,720 ha (43,800 acres)
- Established: 1992
- Website: meteliurp.lrv.lt

Meteliai Regional Park (Metelių regioninis parkas) is a natural and cultural reserve in southern Lithuania. It is located near the city of Lazdijai in Lazdijai district. Established in 1992, the park covers an area of 17,721 ha (43,790 acres). It incorporates several lakes, and serves as a sanctuary for several protected species.

== Geography ==
The Meteliai Regional Park is a protected area located near the city of Lazdijai in Lazdijai district. The park covers an area of 17,720 ha (43,800 acres), and was established in 1992.

It is located on the north-western part of the Dzūkų uplands. The region is characterized by the presence of multiple lakes interspersed with cultivated lands, small mounts with river valleys, glacial moraines, and wetlands. Large lakes in the park include Lake Metelys, and Lake Dusia. The park incorporates a number of villages and heritage sites.

== Protected areas ==
The park has been classified into two strict natural reserves, and nine reserves. The strict natural reserves include Obelytė, which includes several protected flora, and Trakas, which protects Sessile oak forests and nesting sites of lesser spotted eagles. The nine reserves are classified into four landscape reserves, and one each of geomorphological, hydrographical, botanical, zoological, and botanical-zoological reserves.

The landscape reserves include Barčiai that protects morainic landforms, lake terraces, and dunes along the Dusia Lake, Kalniškė that protects the morainic mounds, lakes and valleys of the Dzūkija region, Meteliai that includes the Meteliai, Obelija and Maušelis lakes and their surrounding lands, valleys, forests, and wetlands, and Teizai that incorporates a large morainic hill on the southern slope of the Sūduva upland and Verstaminai hills. The Žagariai Geomorphological Reserve consists of distinct morainic landforms, and street villages.

The Dusia Hydrographical Reserve was established to protect the lake Dusia, the largest lake in southern Lithuania and its associated flora and fauna. The Rinkotai Botanical Reserve is a protected area for deciduous forests. The Juodabalė Zoological Reserve was established to protect the endangered pond turtles. The Trakas Botanical-Zoological Reserve was established to protect the wetland trees along with its fauna.

== Flora and fauna ==
The sessile oak and pond turtles are found only in this region in Lithuania. Plant species found include Cypripedium calceolus, Corydalis cava, Corydalis intermedia, Poa remota, and Carex brizoides. Wetland forest trees include sessile oak, linden, hornbeam, pine, fir, and black alder. The region plays host to a large number of migratory birds during the migratory season in October-November. Birds include red-throated diver, black-throated diver, white-tailed eagle, white-backed woodpecker, European golden plover, northern lapwing, and other fowl such as grebes, gulls, and egrets.

== Gallery ==
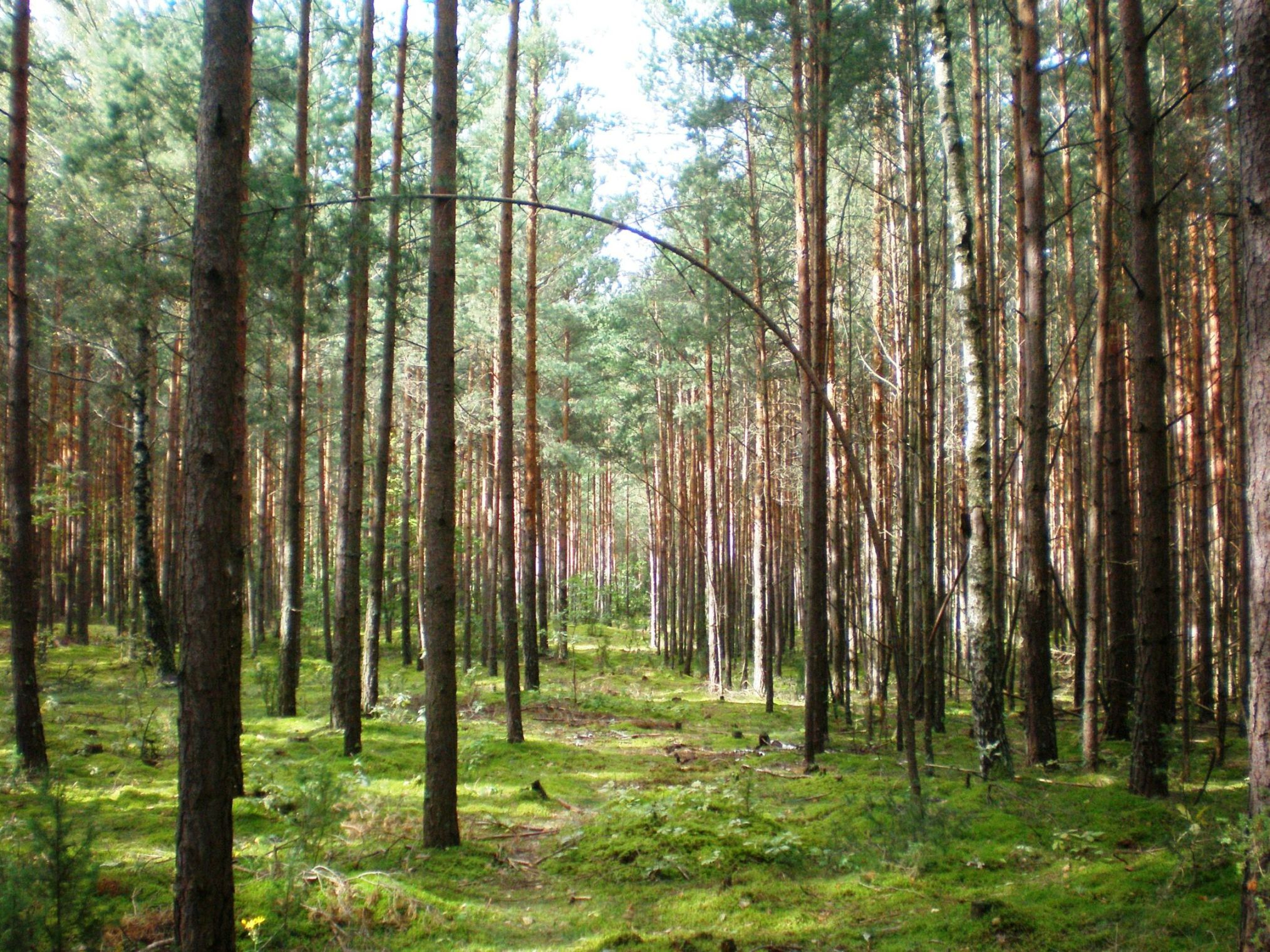
Bijotai forest

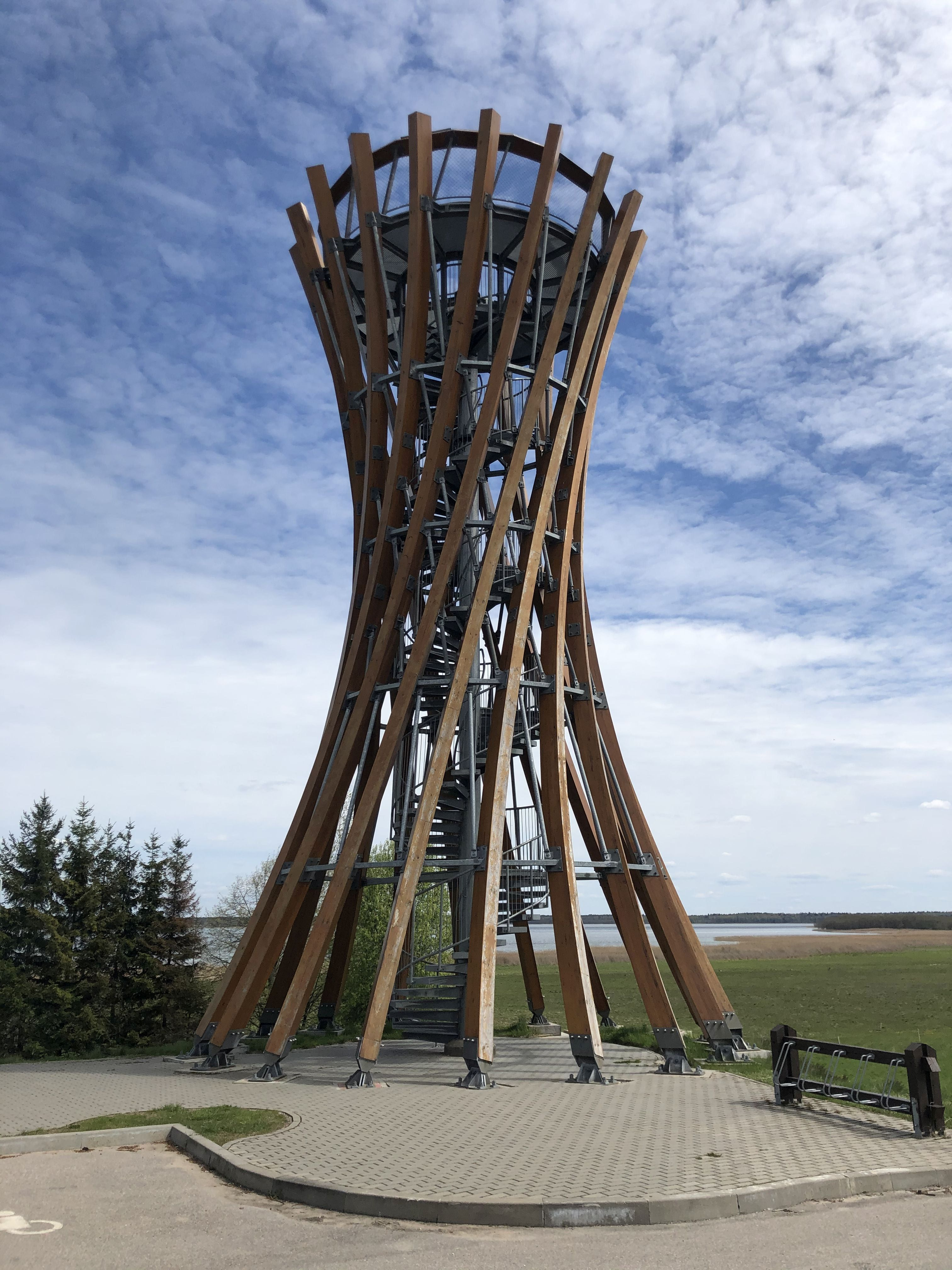
Observation tower

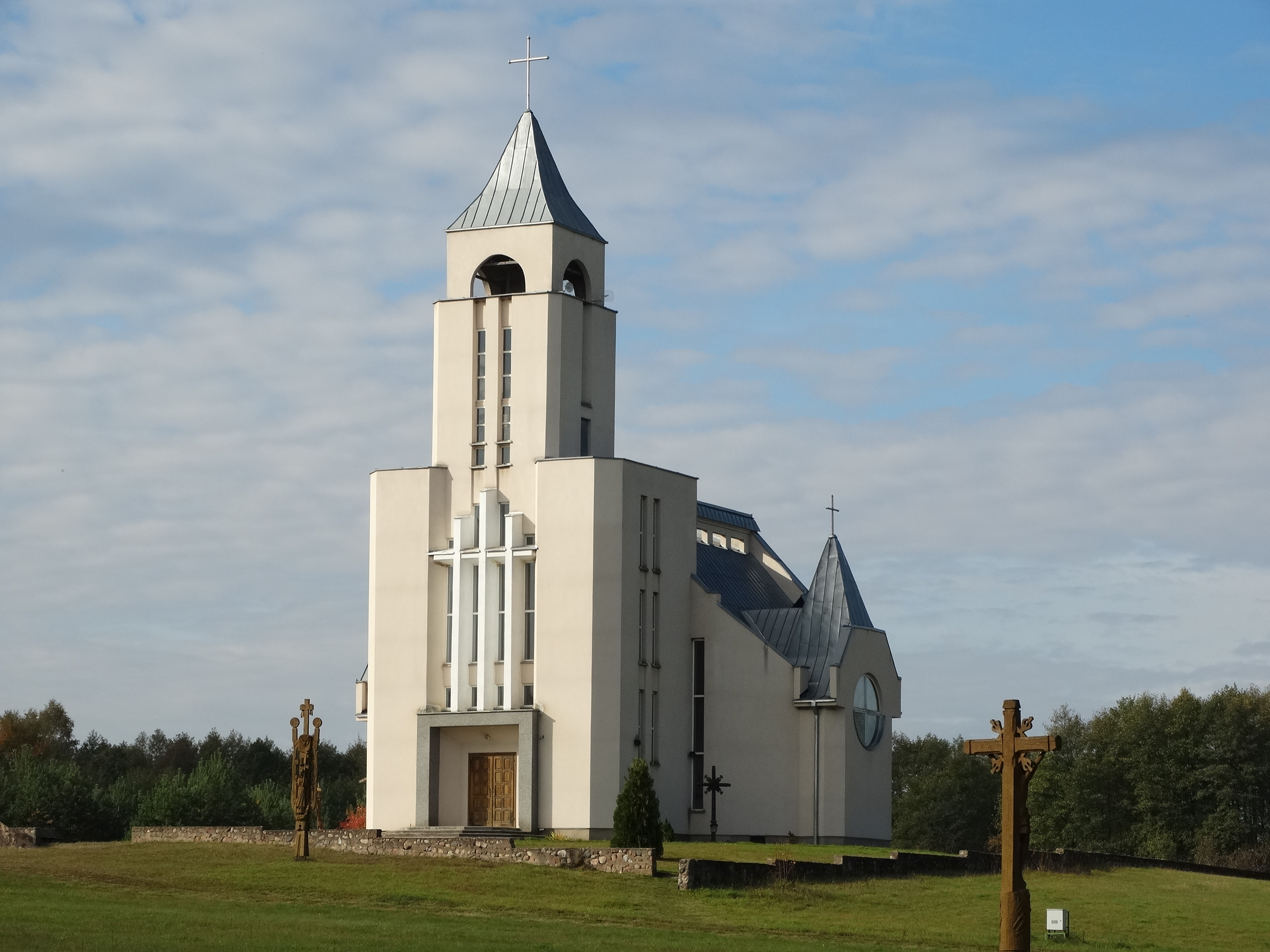
Kryžiai (Crosses) Chapel

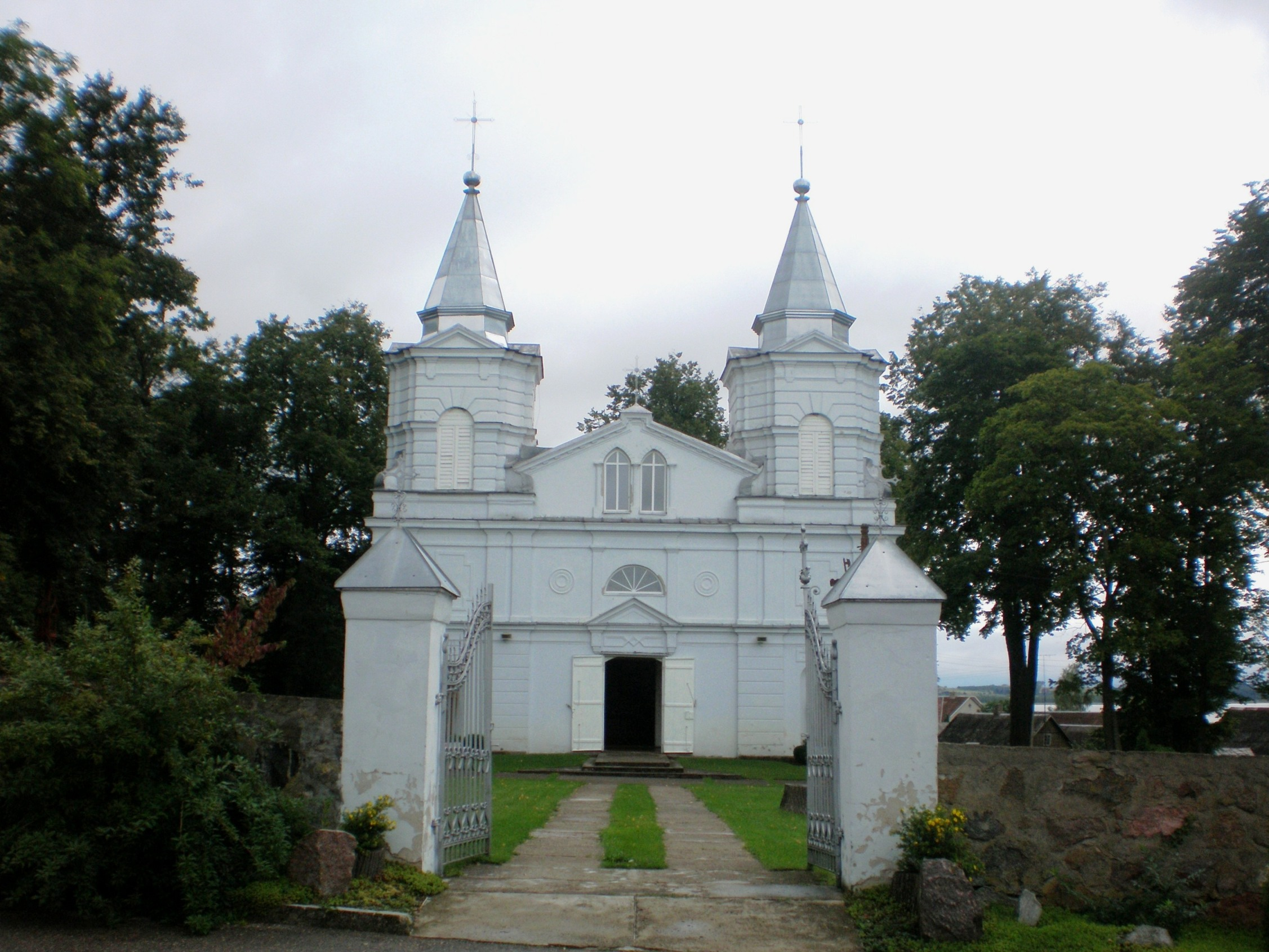
Meteliai church

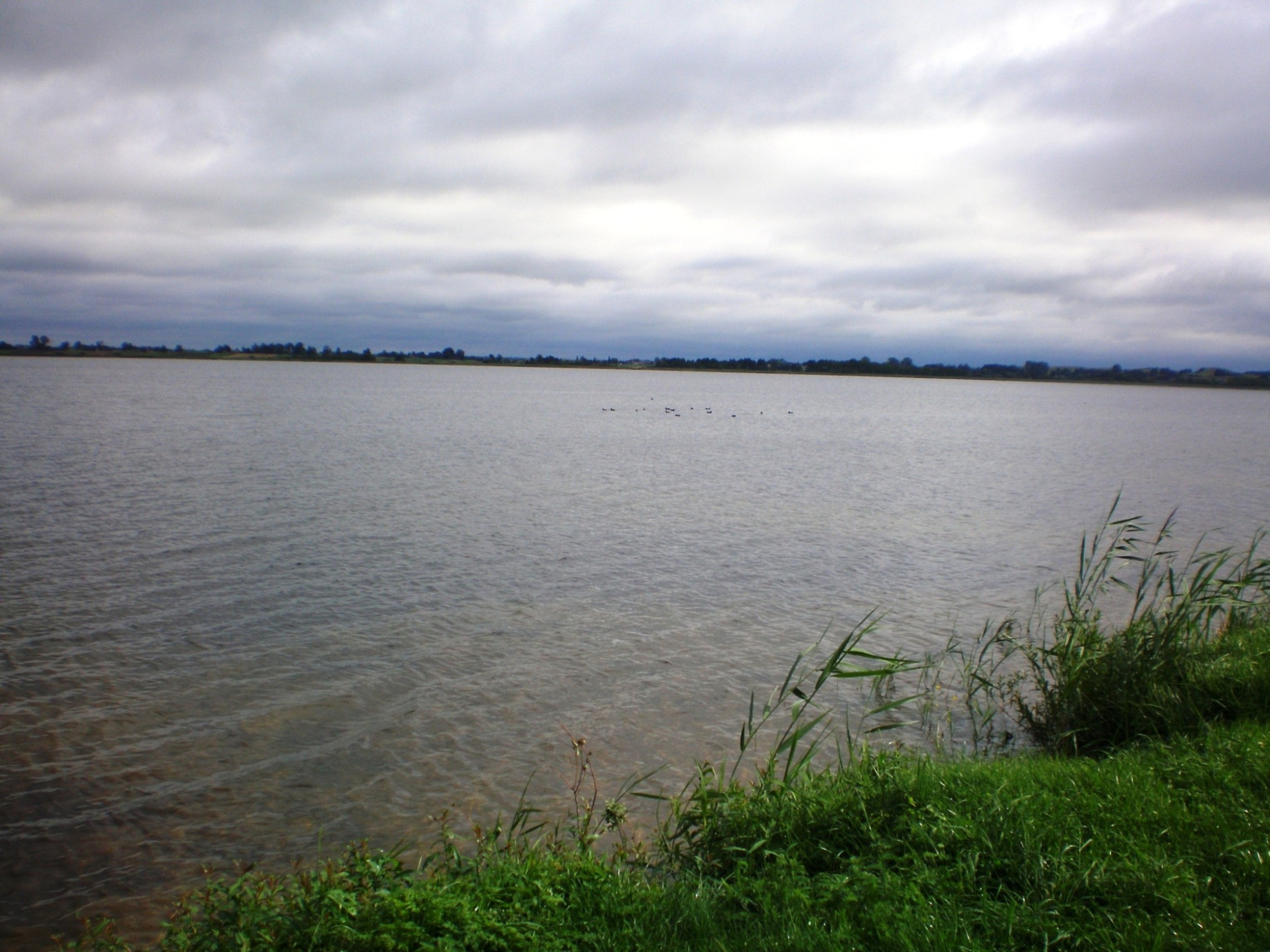
Lake Metelys
