= Metelys =

Lake in Alytus County, Lithuania

Lake Metelys
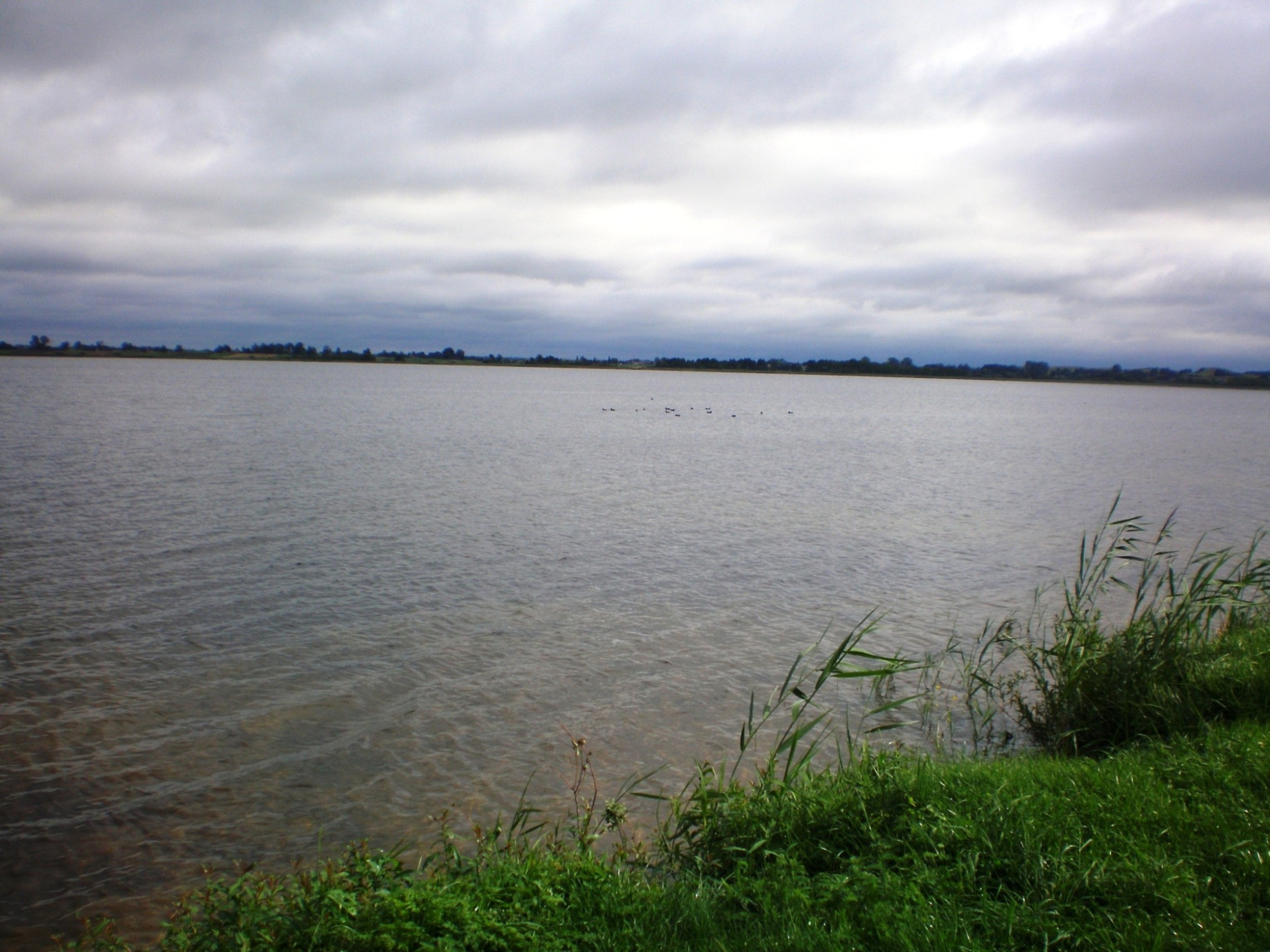

- Location within Lithuania
- Location: Alytus County
- Coordinates: 54°17′51″N 23°46′18″E
- Basin countries: Lithuania
- Surface area: 12.92 km^{2} (4.99 mi^{2})
- Max. depth: 15 m (49 ft)

Lake Metelys is located in southern Lithuania's Alytus County. The lake, covering 1,292 hectares, has a maximum depth of 15 metres. It lies within the boundaries of Meteliai Regional Park. Lake Metelys formed from melted ice lump.

The lake is a notable waterfowl habitat; populations of great crested grebes, greylag goose, and the globally near-threatened ferruginous duck have been observed there.
