= Dusia =

Lake in Lithuania

Lake Dusia
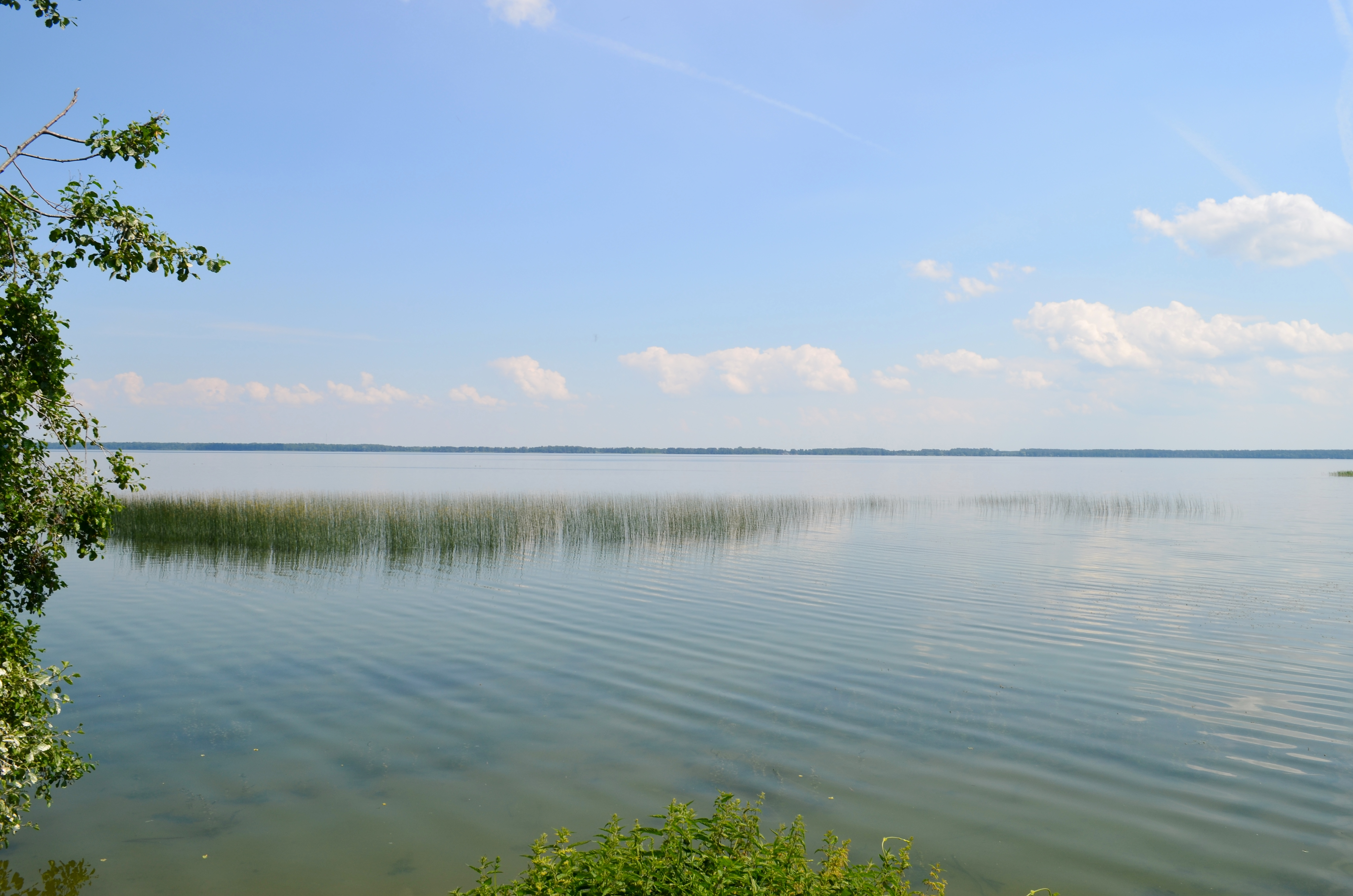

- Location within Lithuania
- Location: Lazdijai district, Lithuania
- Coordinates: 54°17′51″N 23°41′43″E
- Primary inflows: Sutrė
- Primary outflows: Spernia
- Basin countries: Lithuania
- Surface area: 23.17 km^{2} (8.95 sq mi)
- Average depth: 14.6 m (48 ft)
- Max. depth: 32.4 m (106 ft)
- Water volume: 0.34 km^{3} (280,000 acre⋅ft)
- Shore length^{1}: 21.6 km (13.4 mi)
- ^{1} Shore length is not a well-defined measure.

The Dusia lake is the largest lake in Southern Lithuania, Lazdijai district and is part of the Dovinė River basin. Other nearby lakes are Lake Metelys and Lake Obelija.

In the winter of 1954, the ice coverage on lake Dusia was as thick as 78 cm.

Dusia lake accommodates 18 different breeds of fish.
