= Alytus County =

County of Lithuania

Alytus county Alytaus apskritis
- County
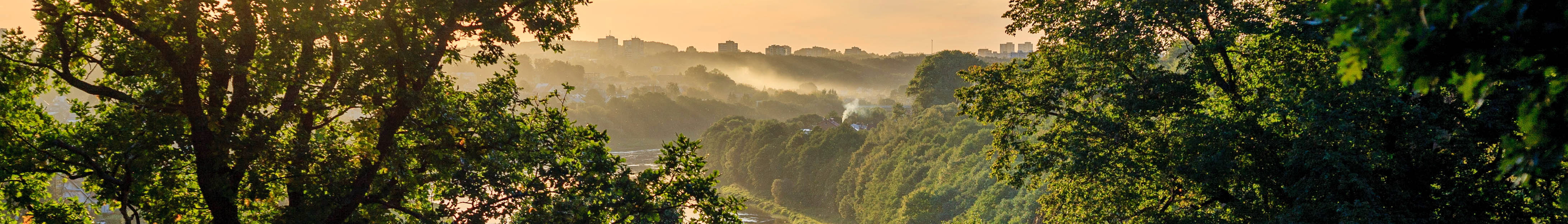
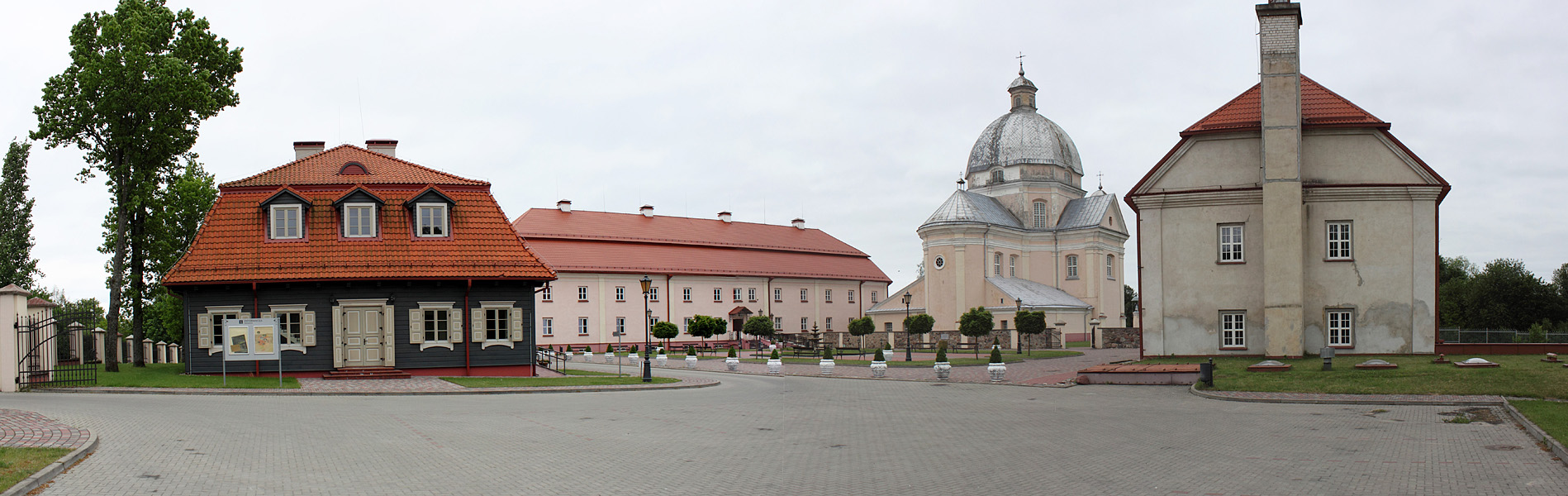
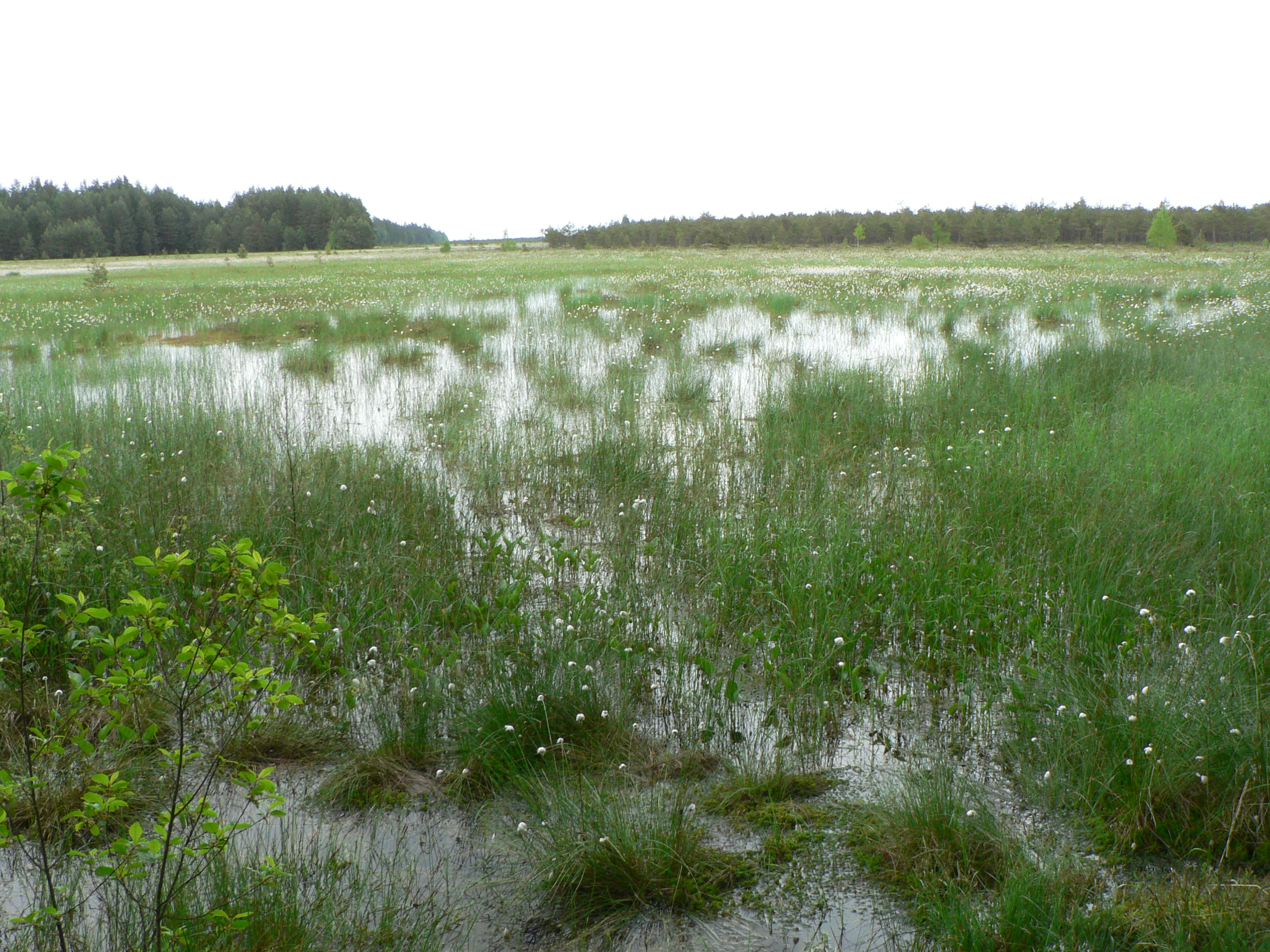
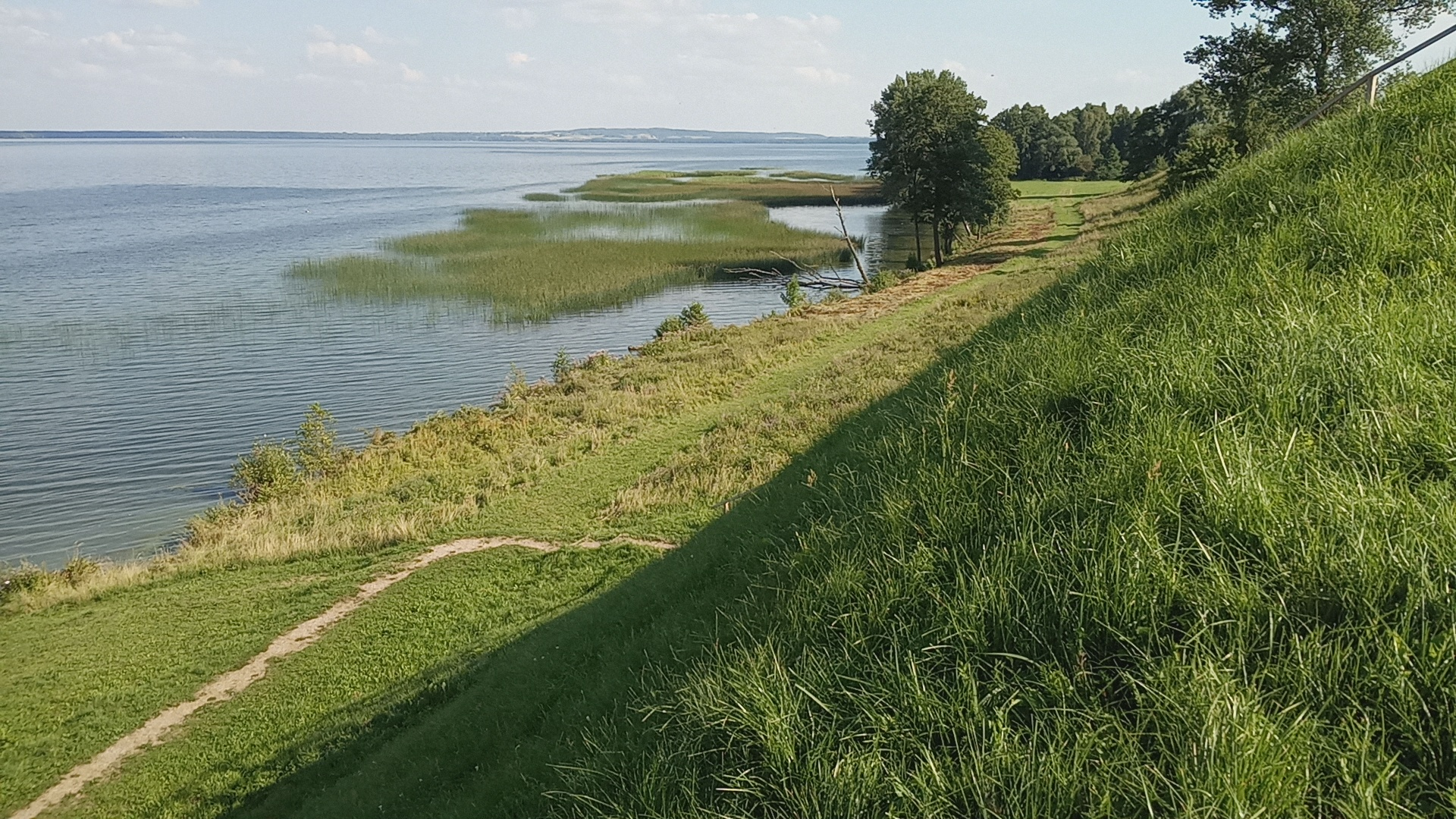
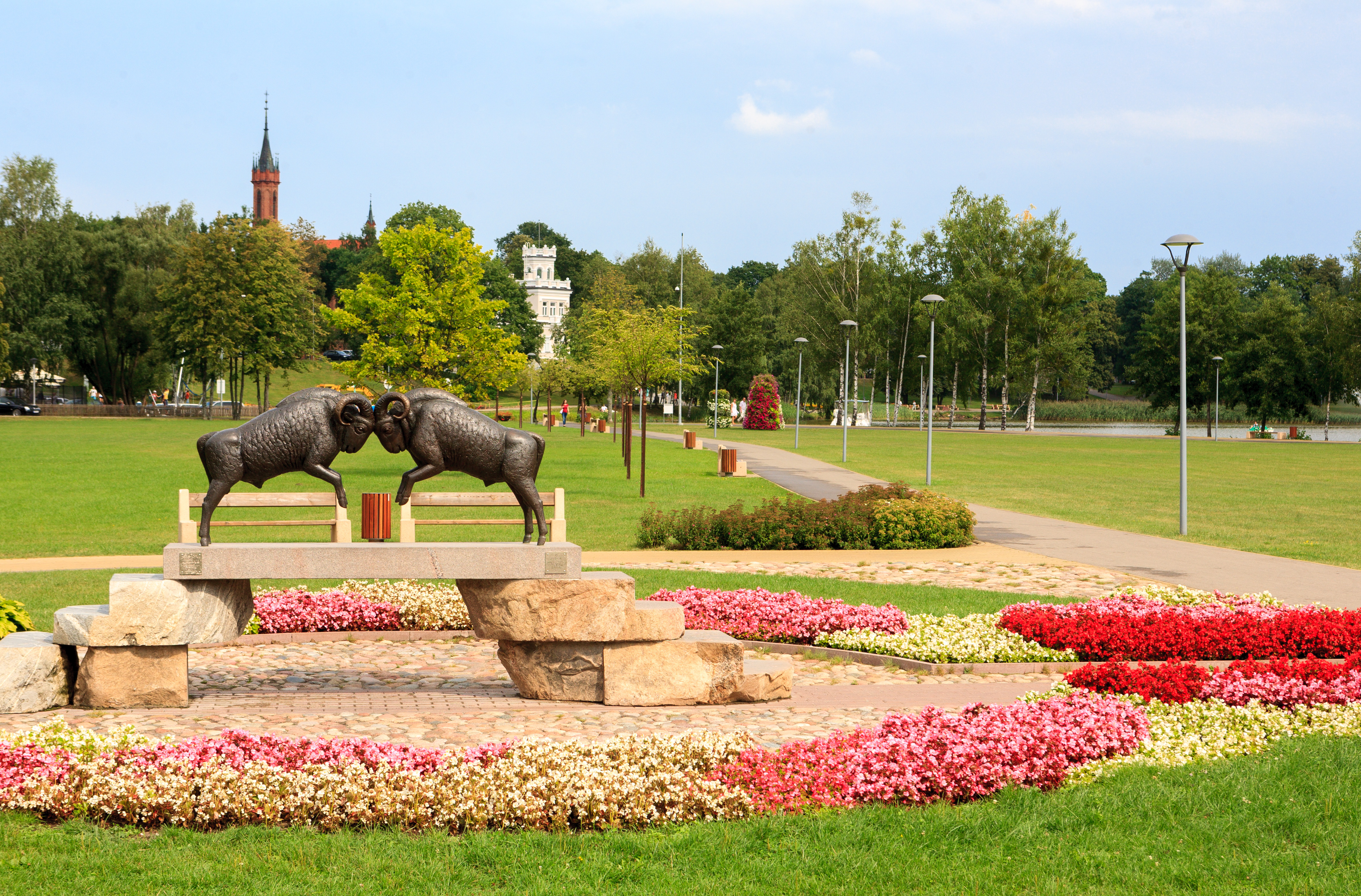
- From the top to bottom-right: Panorama of Alytus from its signature hillfort, Liškiava, Čepkeliai Marsh in Dzūkija National Park, Lake Dusia in Meteliai Regional Park, resort town of Druskininkai.

- Flag Coat of arms
- Interactive map of Alytus county
- Coordinates: 54°23′13″N 24°02′36″E
- Country: Lithuania
- Administrative centre: Alytus
- Municipalities: List: Alytus city municipality; Alytus district municipality; Druskininkai municipality; Lazdijai district municipality; Varėna district municipality

Area
  - Total: 5,418 km^{2} (2,092 sq mi)
- (8.3% of the area of Lithuania)

Population (2020-01-01)
  - Total: 134,070
  - Rank: 7th of 10 (5.2% of the population of Lithuania)
  - Density: 24.75/km^{2} (64.09/sq mi)

GDP
  - Total: €2.0 billion (2024) · 8th
- Time zone: UTC+2 (EET)
  - Summer (DST): UTC+3 (EEST)
- ISO 3166 code: LT-AL
- HDI (2022): 0.846 very high · 7th

Alytus County (Lithuanian: Alytaus apskritis) is one of ten counties in Lithuania. It is the southernmost county, and its capital is the city of Alytus. Its territory lies within the south-western part of Dzūkija, one of five regions of Lithuania. On 1 July 2010, the county administration was abolished, and since that date, Alytus County remains as a territorial and statistical unit.

It borders the Vilnius County in the east, Marijampolė County and Kaunas County in the north, Podlaskie Voivodeship of Poland in the west, and Grodno Region of Belarus in the south.

== Municipalities ==
Alytus County has 5 constituent municipalities:

Alytus City Municipality
Alytus District Municipality
Druskininkai Municipality
Lazdijai District Municipality
Varėna District Municipality

== Geography ==
The town of Druskininkai, a spa visited for its healing waters, is located in Alytus County, as is Grūtas Park, also known as Stalin World, a Soviet theme park. There are more than 420 lakes in Alytus County.

== Cities ==
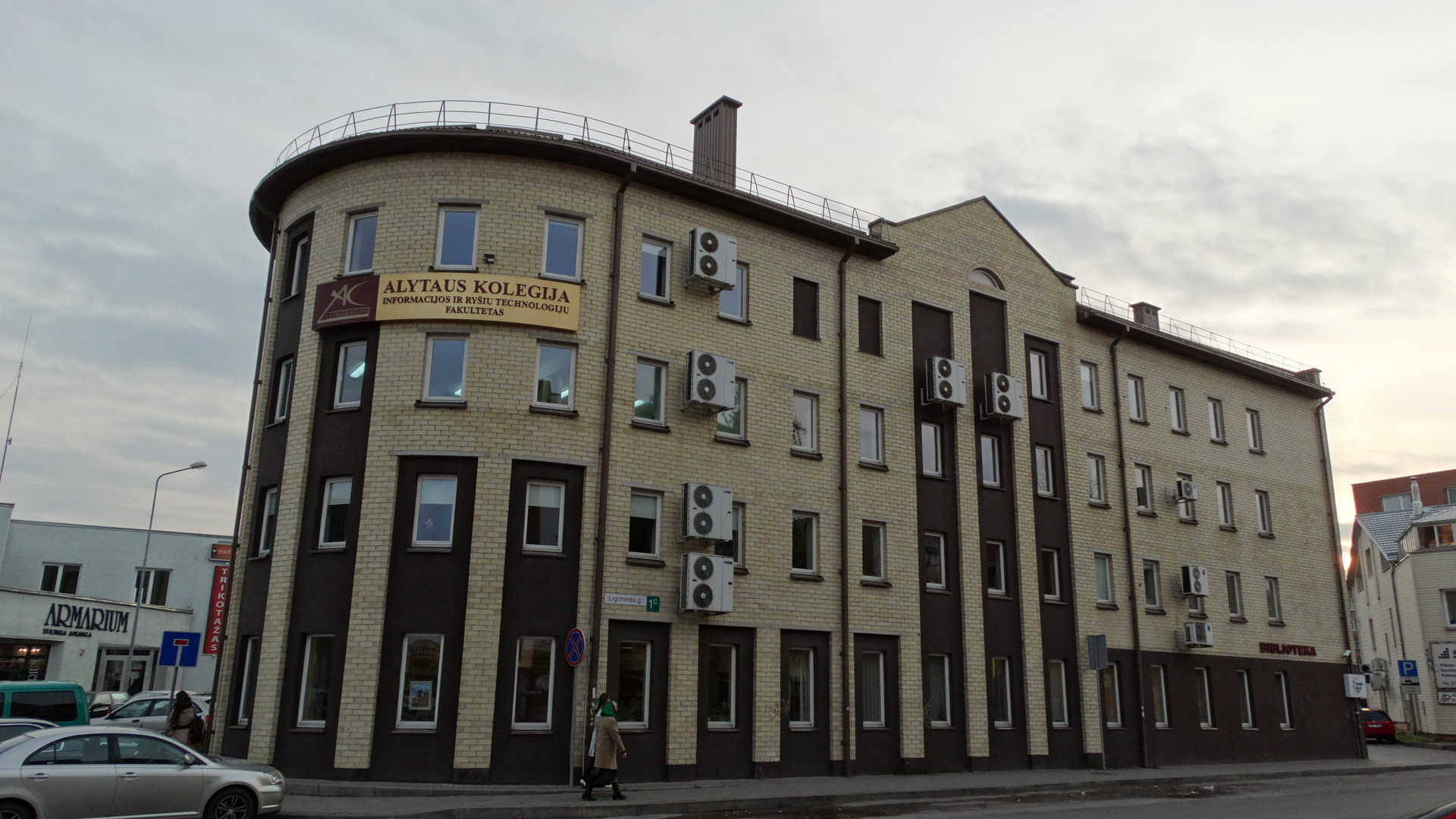
Alytus, capital and largest city of the county

1. Alytus
2. Druskininkai
3. Varėna
4. Lazdijai
5. Simnas
6. Veisiejai
7. Daugai

== Population by municipality ==
2011 Census
Locality	Total	Male	Female
Alytaus county	157,766	73,699	84,067
Alytaus c. mun.	59,964	27,794	32,170
Alytaus d. mun.	28,167	13,687	14,480
Alytaus ward (seniūnija)	4,505	2,205	2,300
Alovės ward (seniūnija)	2,980	1,445	1,535
Butrimonių ward (seniūnija)	2,098	1,027	1,071
Daugų ward (seniūnija)	3,230	1,528	1,702
Krokialaukio ward (seniūnija)	2,148	1,018	1,130
Miroslavo ward (seniūnija)	3,235	1,570	1,665
Nemunaičio ward (seniūnija)	1,248	625	623
Pivašiūnų ward (seniūnija)	1,653	797	856
Punios ward (seniūnija)	2,271	1,142	1,129
Raitininkų ward (seniūnija)	919	448	471
Simno ward (seniūnija)	3,880	1,882	1,998
Druskininkų mun.	21,803	9,692	12,111
Leipalingio ward (seniūnija)	3,368	1,607	1,761
Viečiūnų ward (seniūnija)	3,671	1,727	1,944
Lazdijų d. mun.	22,455	10,610	11,845
Būdviečio ward (seniūnija)	1,061	503	558
Kapčiamiesčio ward (seniūnija)	1,069	506	563
Krosnos ward (seniūnija)	918	449	469
Kučiūnų ward (seniūnija)	805	405	400
Lazdijų miesto ward (seniūnija)	4,531	2,122	2,409
Lazdijų ward (seniūnija)	2,538	1,193	1,345
Noragėlių ward (seniūnija)	1,018	486	532
Seirijų ward (seniūnija)	2,174	1,016	1,158
Šeštokų ward (seniūnija)	1,674	771	903
Šlavantų ward (seniūnija)	590	283	307
Šventežerio ward (seniūnija)	919	448	471
Teizų ward (seniūnija)	1,361	644	717
Veisiejų miesto ward (seniūnija)	1,430	661	769
Veisiejų ward (seniūnija)	2,367	1,123	1,244
Varėnos d. mun.	25,377	11,916	13,461
Jakėnų ward (seniūnija)	1,202	586	616
Kaniavos ward (seniūnija)	1,390	660	730
Marcinkonių ward (seniūnija)	1,389	671	718
Matuizų ward (seniūnija)	2,229	1,084	1,145
Merkinės ward (seniūnija)	3,222	1,514	1,708
Valkininkų ward (seniūnija)	1,932	915	1,017
Varėnos ward (seniūnija)	12,628	5,817	6,811
Vydenių ward (seniūnija)	1,385	669	716

== Curiosities ==
- Merkinė was one of the favorite holiday residences of King of Poland and Grand Duke of Lithuania Władysław IV Vasa who died there in 1648.
- Kapčiamiestis contains a monument and the grave of Polish and Lithuanian national heroine Emilia Plater.

== Gallery ==
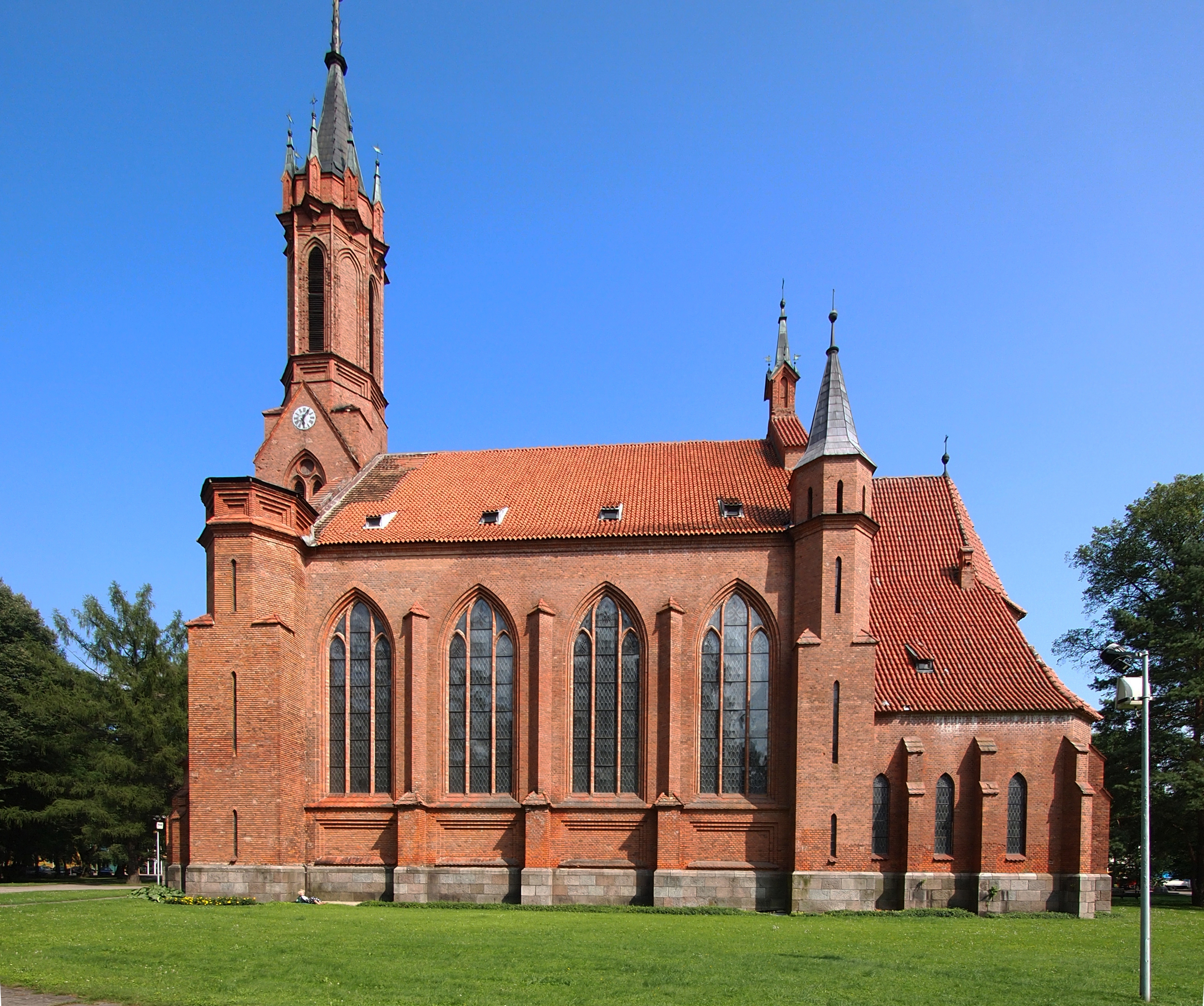
Our Lady of the Scapular church in Druskininkai

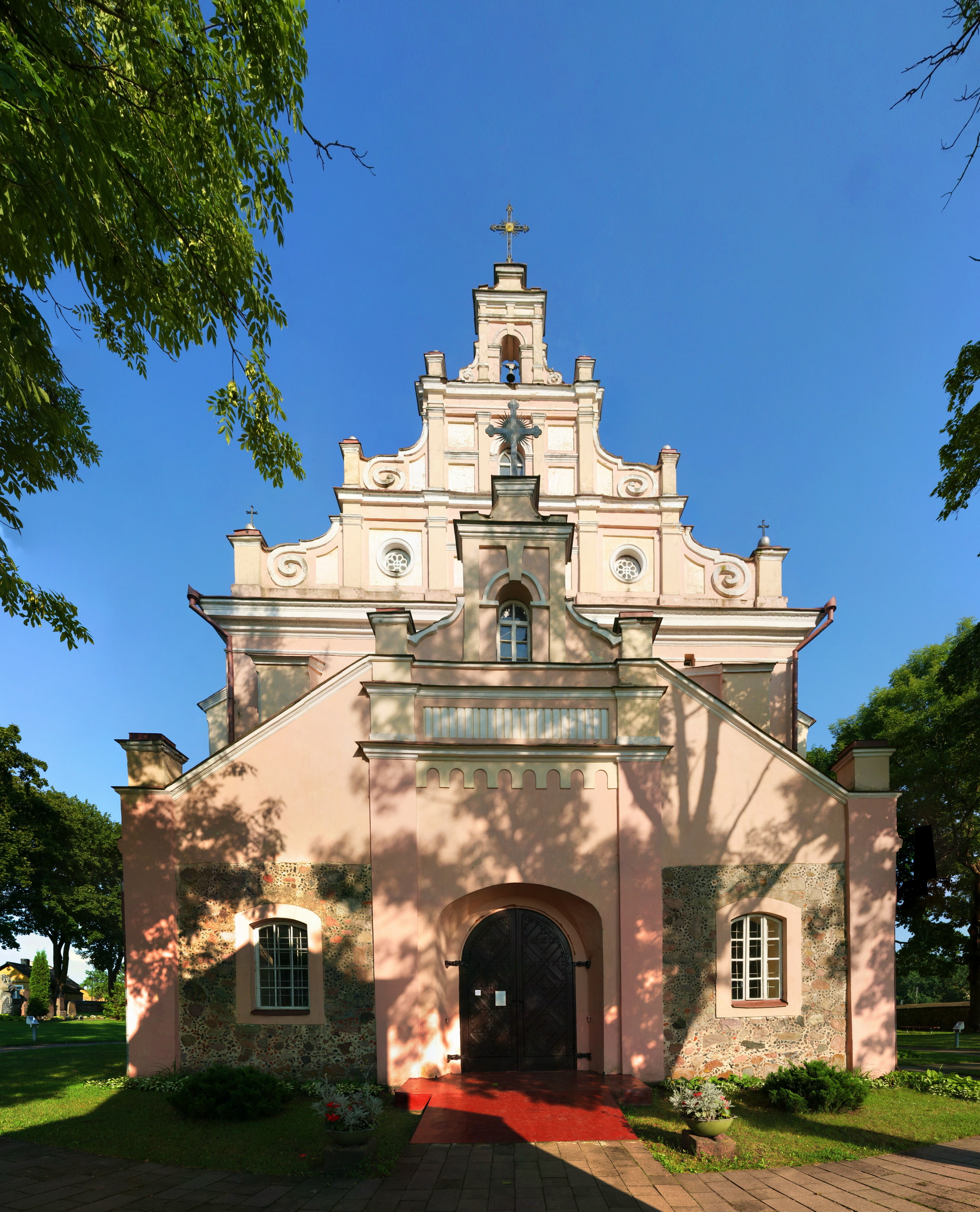
Church of the Assumption in Merkinė

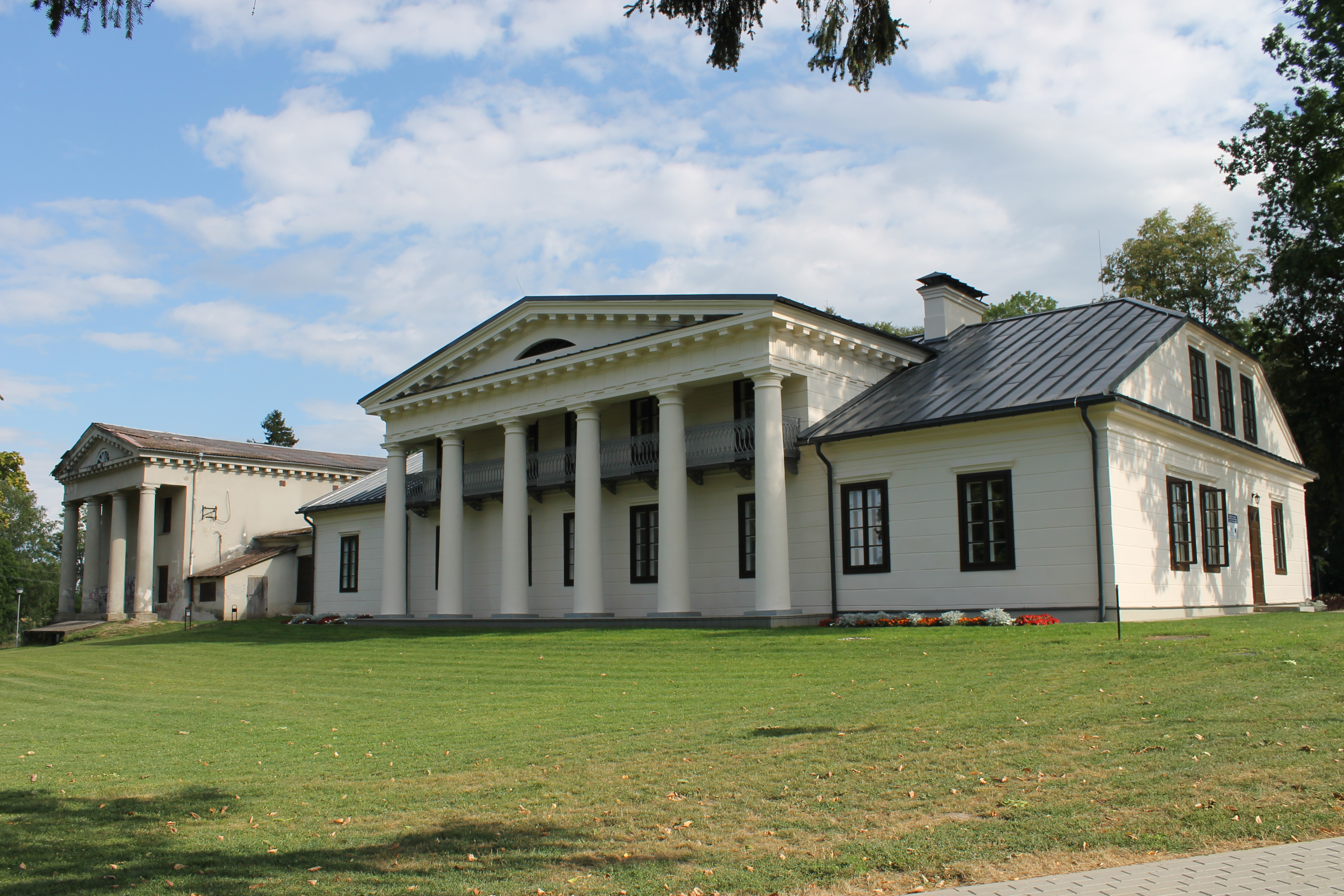
Leipalingis Manor

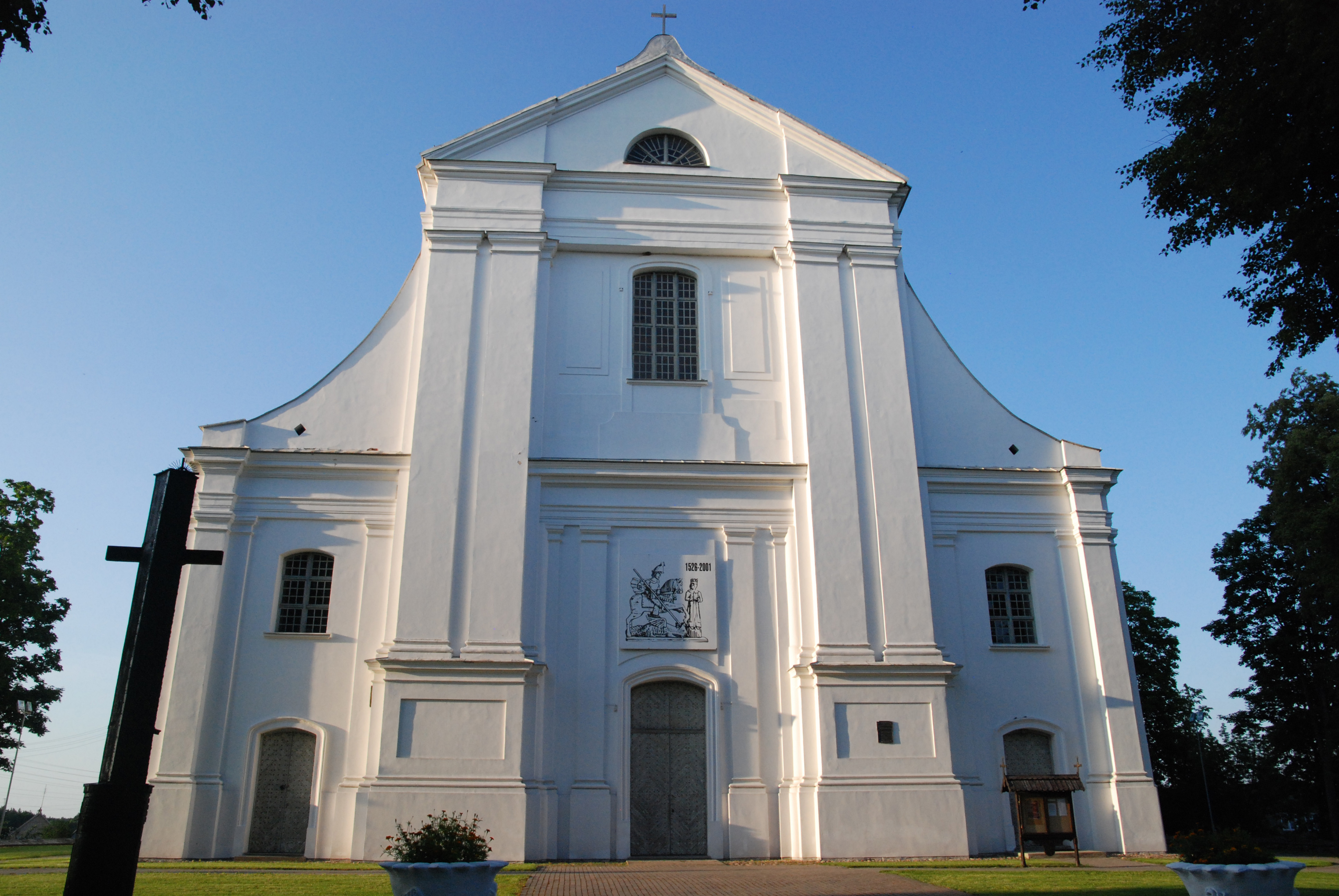
Saint George church in Veisiejai

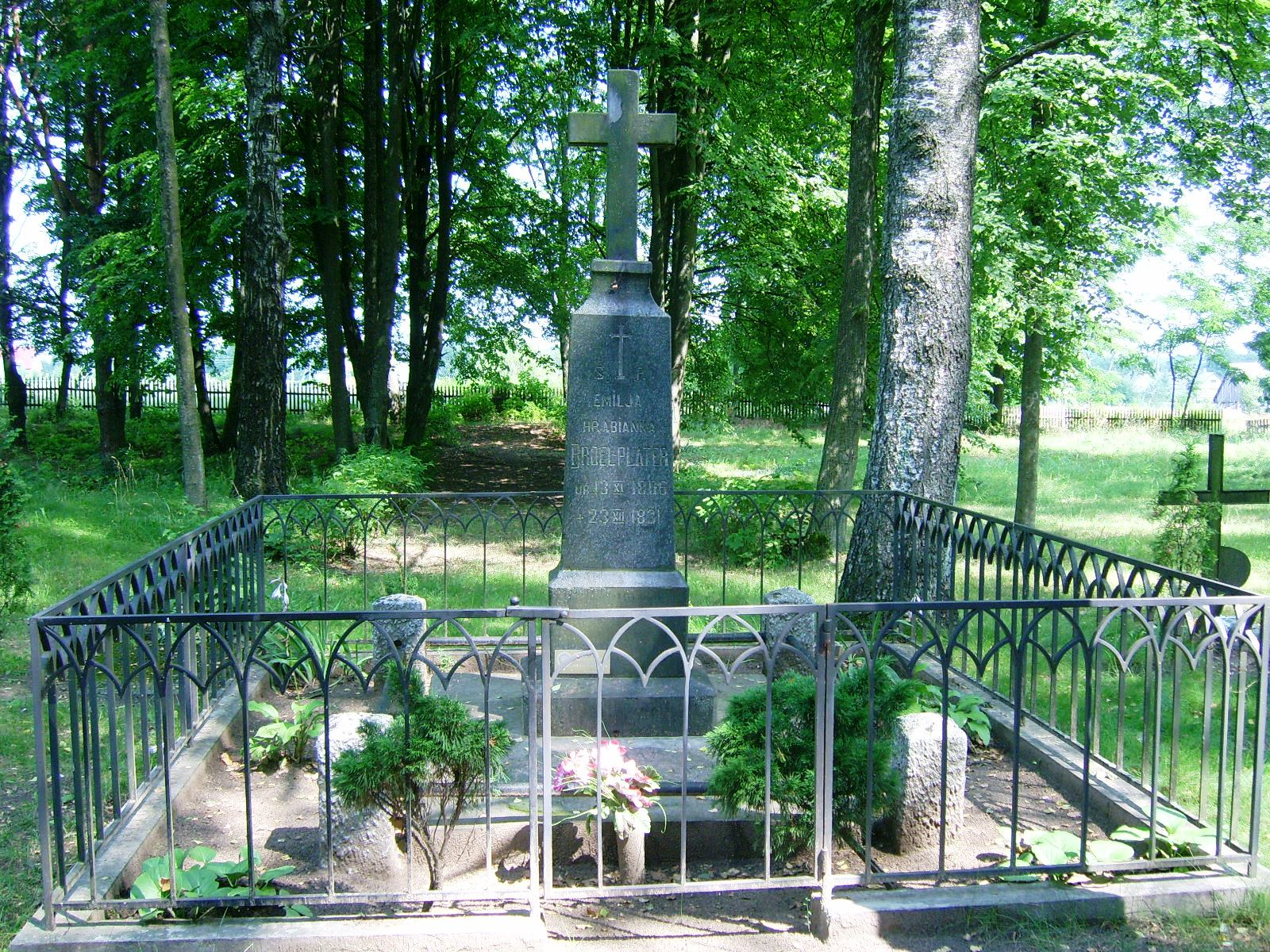
Grave of Emilia Plater in Kapčiamiestis
