= Alytus District Municipality =

Alytus District Municipality Alytaus rajono savivaldybė
- District Municipality
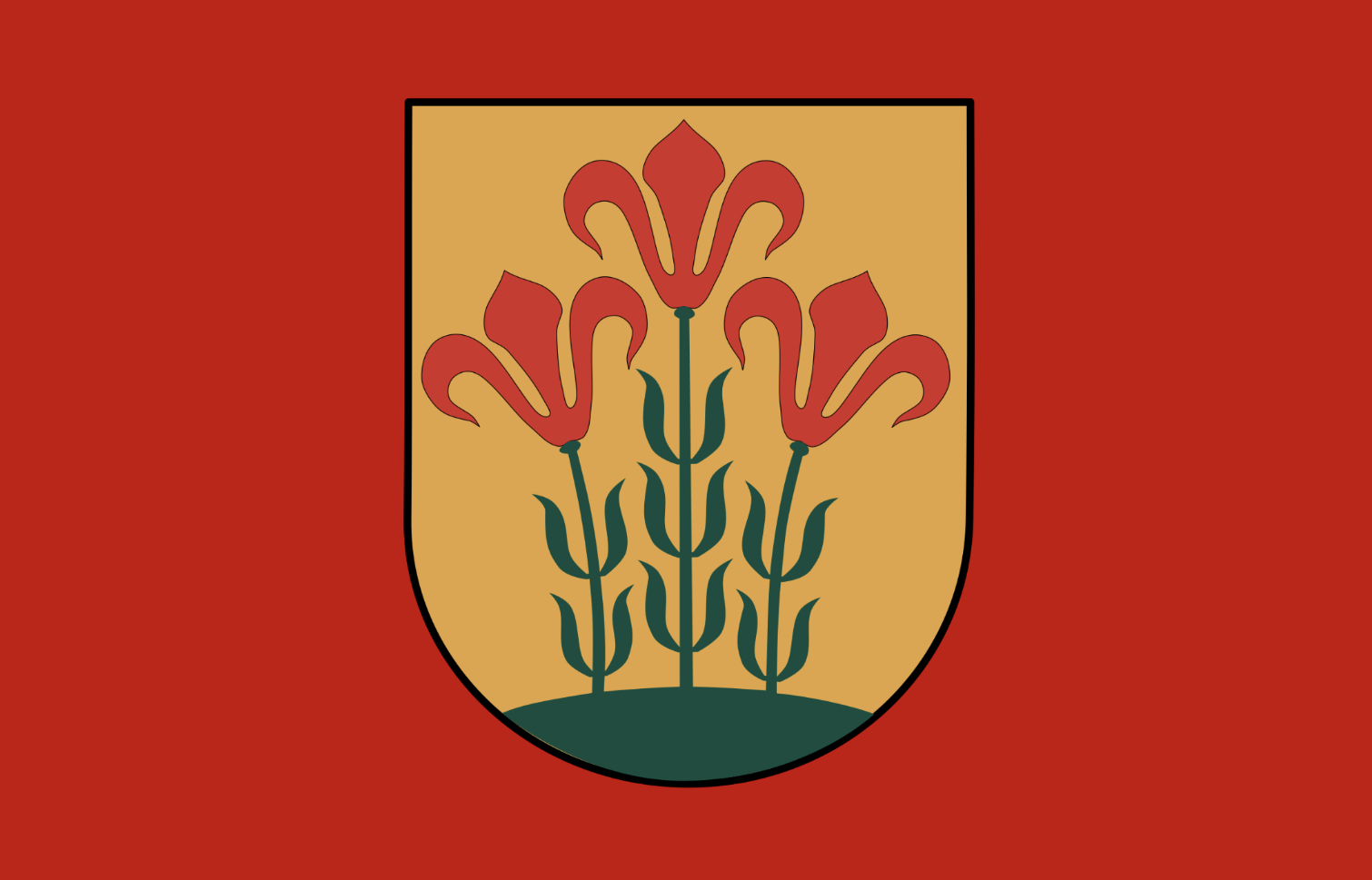
- Flag Coat of arms

- Location of Alytus District Municipality within Lithuania

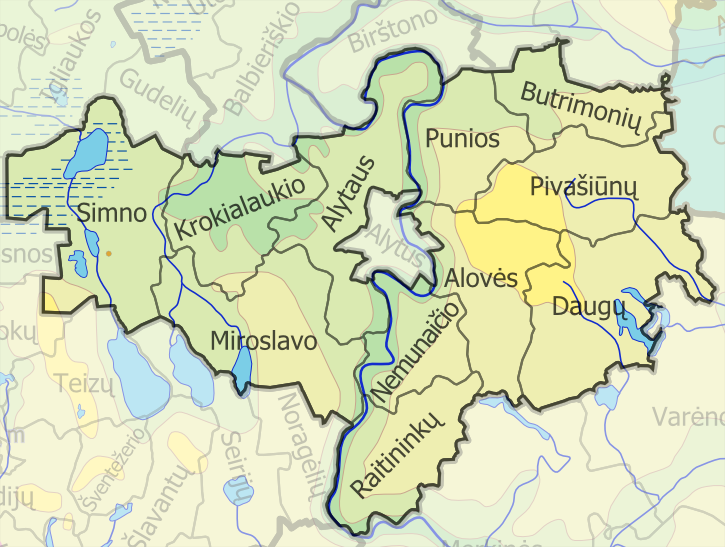
- Location of Alytus District
- Coordinates: 54°22′N 24°07′E
- Country: Lithuania
- Region: Dzūkija
- County: Alytus County
- Established: 1950 (76 years ago)
- Capital: Alytus
- Elderships: 11

Government
  - Type: City Council
  - Body: Alytus District Council
  - Mayor: Rasa Vitkauskienė (DS-VL)
  - Leading: Homeland Union 10 / 25

Area
  - Total: 1,403 km^{2} (542 sq mi)
  - Rank: 20th

Population (2022)
  - Total: 25,373
  - Rank: 31st
  - Density: 18.08/km^{2} (46.8/sq mi)
  - Rank: 38th
- Time zone: UTC+2 (EET)
  - Summer (DST): UTC+3 (EEST)
- ZIP Codes: 62001–64486
- Phone code: +370 (315)
- Website: www.arsa.lt

The Alytus District Municipality (Lithuanian: Alytaus rajono savivaldybė) is a municipality in Alytus County, Lithuania, located in the Dzūkija ethnographic region.

This municipality was founded in 1950, and until 1953 was a part of the Kaunas Province. In 1959, another reorganization of parts of the former Simnas and Daugai municipalities occurred, which included the towns of Simnas and Daugai. In 1962 it was expanded further, attaching part of the former Jieznas municipality. In 1968 parts of the municipality were attached to the Prienai District Municipality and Trakai District Municipality, and in 1969 another part of Varėna District Municipality.

The current coat of arms of the Alytus district municipality was announced by Lithuanian presidential decree on August 7, 2001.

== Heritage ==
Alytus District Municipality has 72 archeological, 395 historical, 144 art, 29 architectural and 3 urbanistic monuments, as well as 19 hillforts.

== Geography ==
The district has 23.5% of its territory covered in forests, mostly pinewoods. The largest forests are Punia Pinewood and Noškūnai Forest. Peatland makes up 9% of the district. The district is also home to the Žuvintas Biosphere Reserve. Neman flows northwards through the district, as well as its tributaries Bambena, Peršėkė and Varėnė. The district has 70 lakes.

== Elderships ==
Alytus District Municipality contains 11 constituent elderships:

1. Alovė (3,112)
2. Butrimonys (1,625)
3. Daugai (2,725)
4. Krokialaukis (1,788)
5. Miroslavas (2,798)
6. Nemunaitis (981)
7. Pivašiūnai (1,420)
8. Punia (2,362)
9. Simnas (3,148)
10. Raitininkai (Makniūnai) (748)
11. Alytus (Miklusėnai) (4,874)

== Structure ==
District structure:

- 2 cities – Daugai and Simnas;
- 3 towns – Butrimonys, Krokialaukis, Nemunaitis;
- 426 villages.

Biggest population (2001):

- Simnas – 1980
- Daugai – 1458
- Butrimonys – 1126
- Miklusėnai – 1021
- Punia – 809
- Luksnėnai – 614
- Venciūnai – 588
- Alovė – 552
- Daugai (village) – 480
- Ūdrija – 453

== Partnership regions ==
Cities and regions that have partnerships with Alytus District:

- Gmina Puńsk, Poland
- Ostrołęka County, Poland
- Choszczno, Poland
- Pisz, Poland
- Sopot, Poland
- Västra Götaland County, Sweden

== Population by locality ==
2011 census
Locality	Status	Total	Male	Female
Alytaus d. mun.		28,167	13,687	14,480
Alytaus ward (seniūnija)		4,505	2,205	2,300
Aniškis	K	28	16	12
Arminai I	K	7	3	4
Arminai II	K	0	0	0
Bakšiai	K	31	17	14
Bernotiškės	K	1	1	0
Bundoriai	K	13	7	6
Butkūnai	K	47	27	20
Butrimiškiai	K	120	57	63
Daugirdėliai	K	28	14	14
Dubenka	K	4	2	2
Dubėnai	K	18	10	8
Dubiai	K	34	18	16
Geniai	K	309	155	154
Jasunskai	K	52	26	26
Jovaišonys	K	59	26	33
Junonys	K	12	5	7
Jurgiškiai	K	98	46	52
Kaniūkai	K	73	35	38
Karklynai	K	43	23	20
Kelmanonys	K	16	8	8
Kibirkščiai	K	9	4	5
Kriauniai	K	30	16	14
Likiškėliai	K	216	103	113
Likiškiai	K	53	24	29
Luksnėnai	K	491	235	256
Margarava	K	19	10	9
Miklusėnai	K	1,044	518	526
Mikutiškiai	K	32	20	12
Naujokai	K	2	1	1
Navickai	K	69	32	37
Norūnai	K	78	40	38
Padaglė	VS	5	1	4
Panemuninkai	K	160	79	81
Paplanskai	K	12	4	8
Praniūnai	K	193	95	98
Radžiūnai	K	295	147	148
Raudonikiai	K	44	16	28
Revai	K	31	18	13
Rumbonys	K	37	14	23
Rutka	K	10	5	5
Strazdinė	K	0	0	0
Stražiškės	K	0	0	0
Talokiai	K	396	188	208
Taukotiškės	K	12	5	7
Užubaliai	K	93	49	44
Vytautiškės	K	11	7	4
Volungės	K	49	22	27
Zaidai	K	4	2	2
Žaunieriškiai	K	117	54	63
Alovės ward (seniūnija)		2,980	1,445	1,535
Akalyčia	K	45	21	24
Alytus	K	429	220	209
Alovė	K	507	242	265
Bokštai	K	3	2	1
Davainiškės	K	38	18	20
Dobrovolė	K	5	2	3
Domantonys	K	71	32	39
Ilgai	K	91	41	50
Janapolis	K	4	2	2
Jurkionys	K	274	137	137
Kaciolkai	K	2	1	1
Kalesninkai	K	54	26	28
Kaniūkai	K	183	93	90
Klausiškės	K	7	4	3
Kudariškės	K	35	18	17
Kutiškės	VS	0	0	0
Lelionys	K	82	31	51
Mančiūnai	K	55	27	28
Mikalavas	K	29	16	13
Muiželėnai	K	174	95	79
Obelaičiai	K	6	3	3
Pagurniai	K	11	3	8
Plikionys	K	17	8	9
Poteronys	K	70	31	39
Skernė	K	13	3	10
Skirgailiai	K	15	9	6
Slabadėlė	K	39	18	21
Šaukėnai	K	9	6	3
Švabalaukis	K	14	8	6
Švobiškės	K	61	29	32
Takniškiai	K	70	37	33
Terpinės	K	4	3	1
Ulyškai	K	26	14	12
Venciūnai	K	524	239	285
Vėžiškės	K	4	1	3
Žarnonys	K	0	0	0
Židonys	K	9	5	4
Butrimonių ward (seniūnija)		2,098	1,027	1,071
Aleksandrava	K	12	6	6
Apynėliai	K	14	9	5
Ąžuolėnai	K	3	2	1
Beržinė	K	0	0	0
Butrimiškės	K	7	4	3
Butrimonys	MST	941	445	496
Darbalaukis	K	9	4	5
Dūdiškės	K	2	1	1
Dūkiškės	K	25	13	12
Eičiūnai	K	282	138	144
Eigirdonys	K	61	31	30
Gailiakiemis	K	107	49	58
Geruliai	K	14	10	4
Greikonys	K	51	25	26
Griškonys	K	42	22	20
Janauka	K	5	1	4
Juodgiris	K	0	0	0
Jurkonys	K	40	23	17
Lelionys	K	21	13	8
Likiškės	K	7	3	4
Liubartiškės	K	0	0	0
Mažiūnai	K	51	23	28
Mickūnava	K	15	8	7
Olendernė	K	42	17	25
Pabaliai	K	47	22	25
Pikuškės	K	3	1	2
Plasapninkai	K	89	38	51
Ratininkai	K	25	19	6
Silvanava	K	0	0	0
Stanuliškės	K	0	0	0
Trakininkai	K	89	51	38
Vadaišiškės	K	0	0	0
Vanagėliai	K	35	15	20
Vanžadiškės	K	3	2	1
Žalioji	K	56	32	24
Daugų ward (seniūnija)		3,230	1,528	1,702
Arčiūnai	K	32	16	16
Atžalynas	K	2	1	1
Bogušiškės	K	25	12	13
Bukaučiškės I	K	26	9	17
Bukaučiškės II	K	20	10	10
Būda	K	8	5	3
Daugai	K	400	204	196
Daugai	M	1,170	541	629
Doškonys	K	81	35	46
Dvarčėnai	K	46	21	25
Giniškės	K	15	6	9
Griciūnai	K	6	4	2
Juozapava	K	0	0	0
Kančėnai	K	250	121	129
Karliškės	K	53	30	23
Majauka	K	0	0	0
Melnytėlė	K	12	6	6
Meškučiai	K	107	43	64
Mieliūnai	K	36	19	17
Novoplenta	K	6	3	3
Pagilė	K	42	26	16
Pavartėnai	K	29	10	19
Pavartės	K	9	4	5
Pocelonys	K	100	49	51
Pociūniškės	K	13	5	8
Purveliai	K	5	2	3
Rakatanskai	K	15	7	8
Rakščia	K	2	1	1
Rimėnai	K	208	98	110
Rodžia	K	39	21	18
Rokančiai	K	10	2	8
Sala	K	122	59	63
Skabeikiai	K	42	14	28
Slavinčiškės	K	14	6	8
Šiukščiakalnis	K	31	17	14
Tamašava	K	0	0	0
Vaikantonys	K	78	39	39
Vėžionys	K	78	32	46
Viečiūnai	K	22	13	9
Vinkšninės	K	7	3	4
Žilinčiškės	K	1	0	1
Žvirgždėnai	K	68	34	34
Krokialaukio ward (seniūnija)		2,148	1,018	1,130
Arminai I	K	6	2	4
Arminai II	K	2	1	1
Barkūniškis	K	9	4	5
Cibiliekai	K	42	22	20
Čiurlionys I	K	140	65	75
Čiurlionys II	K	4	2	2
Čiurlionys III	K	0	0	0
Čižikai	K	37	18	19
Dapkiškės	K	32	15	17
Daugirdai	K	84	35	49
Dirvonai	K	0	0	0
Duselninkai	K	31	14	17
Gudeliai	K	39	18	21
Jackonys	K	23	9	14
Kabinės	K	16	9	7
Kalesninkai	K	42	20	22
Kirmėliškės	K	6	2	4
Krekštėnai	K	102	50	52
Krokialaukis	MST	218	103	115
Krokininkai	K	82	38	44
Liuklingėnai	K	2	1	1
Maštalieriai	K	234	104	130
Paberžinė	K	10	6	4
Pakašavas	K	41	22	19
Peršėkė	K	25	10	15
Pošnia	K	51	25	26
Santaika	K	175	87	88
Sapatiškės	K	24	13	11
Svirniškės	K	0	0	0
Šipultiškės	K	16	12	4
Šiugždai	K	2	1	1
Ūdrija	K	385	187	198
Varanauskas	K	116	52	64
Varda	K	37	14	23
Varnagiriai	K	115	57	58
Miroslavo ward (seniūnija)		3,235	1,570	1,665
Arciškonys	K	77	34	43
Atesninkai	K	25	12	13
Balkasodis	K	99	50	49
Balkūnai	K	106	50	56
Bendrės	K	103	53	50
Buckūnai	K	60	31	29
Burbiškės	K	20	13	7
Cigoniškiai	K	44	22	22
Dirmiškės	K	23	11	12
Geistarai	K	22	12	10
Geistariškės	K	16	8	8
Geistarukai	K	19	5	14
Gudiniškės	K	24	12	12
Kaukai I	K	5	2	3
Kaukai II	K	3	1	2
Kumečiai	K	277	137	140
Kurnėnai	K	39	19	20
Kurtiniškės	K	7	2	5
Laburdiškės	K	9	5	4
Laukinčiai	K	61	31	30
Laukintukai	K	45	19	26
Mančiūnai	K	36	20	16
Mankūnai	K	106	47	59
Maslaučiškės	K	59	28	31
Milastonys	K	6	3	3
Miroslavas	K	382	170	212
Mociškėnai	K	22	9	13
Obelija	K	92	44	48
Obelytė	K	30	16	14
Obelninkai	K	42	16	26
Obelninkėliai	K	40	24	16
Padirmiškis	K	0	0	0
Papėčiai	K	97	48	49
Parėčėnai	K	194	101	93
Peršėkininkai	K	121	61	60
Plenta	K	26	14	12
Pupasodis	K	142	75	67
Remeikiai	K	36	16	20
Rožučiai	K	28	13	15
Seimeniškiai	K	58	29	29
Strimina	K	1	1	0
Tolkūnai	K	130	59	71
Vankiškiai	K	359	175	184
Viešnagiai	K	31	16	15
Vovos	K	13	6	7
Zizėnai	K	100	50	50
Nemunaičio ward (seniūnija)		1,248	625	623
Balninkai	K	112	52	60
Dubriai	K	3	1	2
Dušnionys	K	38	21	17
Einorai	K	61	33	28
Ferma	K	18	9	9
Gečialaukis	K	96	45	51
Geisčiūnai	K	11	5	6
Kalnėnai	K	26	11	15
Kastriškės	K	19	10	9
Lankos	K	7	4	3
Nemunaitis	K	234	123	111
Nemunaitis	MST	153	71	82
Sudvajai	K	14	7	7
Užupiai	K	398	202	196
Vangelonys	K	58	31	27
Pivašiūnų ward (seniūnija)		1,653	797	856
Anykštėnai	K	4	1	3
Bazorai	K	105	54	51
Bundžiai	K	27	12	15
Būda	K	16	7	9
Būriškės	K	9	4	5
Čižiūnai	K	26	14	12
Dusmenėliai	K	1	0	1
Eigelonys	K	37	21	16
Einoronys	K	20	7	13
Gervėnai	K	98	50	48
Junčionys	K	95	47	48
Juočiškės	K	10	5	5
Jurgelionys I	K	8	5	3
Jurgelionys II	K	6	3	3
Kaniūkai	K	43	21	22
Karkliniškės	K	44	21	23
Kazimieravas	K	20	11	9
Kedonys	K	128	67	61
Klydžionys	K	42	24	18
Krūmijos	K	8	5	3
Lačionys	K	67	34	33
Leoniškės	K	3	2	1
Liesionys	K	19	11	8
Mikalavas	K	148	74	74
Miknolesai	K	2	0	2
Navasodai I	K	3	1	2
Navasodai II	K	6	2	4
Pavarėnys	K	0	0	0
Pašilis	K	8	2	6
Paškūniškės	K	1	1	0
Petravina	K	0	0	0
Pivašiūnai	K	292	124	168
Pušėnai	K	14	6	8
Radvilonys	K	20	8	12
Remešiškis	K	10	4	6
Skraičionys	K	101	47	54
Statkiškės	K	15	5	10
Sudvariškės	K	37	19	18
Tabalenka	K	115	55	60
Telėtninkai	K	2	0	2
Užukalniai	K	6	3	3
Užupis	K	0	0	0
Ūta	K	11	7	4
Žadiškės	K	15	7	8
Žemaitėliai	K	11	6	5
Punios ward (seniūnija)		2,271	1,142	1,129
Adamonys	K	20	10	10
Aleksandrava	K	22	12	10
Ardiškės	K	11	8	3
Gajauciškis	K	6	3	3
Gemaitiškės	K	9	5	4
Gerkiškės	K	5	2	3
Karvelninkai	K	11	4	7
Kerai	K	4	3	1
Kružiūnai	K	69	31	38
Kulabiškės	K	9	3	6
Medukšta	K	303	165	138
Mišiškės	K	11	6	5
Navasiolkai	K	36	17	19
Norgeliškės	K	74	34	40
Padvariškiai	K	49	28	21
Paliepiai	K	64	35	29
Panemuninkėliai	K	135	72	63
Peckūnai	K	9	1	8
Pievagaliai	K	41	23	18
Punia	K	600	287	313
Raganiškės	K	11	5	6
Raižava	K	7	3	4
Raižiai	K	107	51	56
Raubonys	K	40	21	19
Silgionys	K	27	15	12
Staniava	K	17	7	10
Strielčiai	K	53	27	26
Taučionys	K	17	7	10
Vaidaugai	K	19	11	8
Vaisodžiai	K	309	157	152
Vaišupis	VS	3	2	1
Valiūnai	K	20	8	12
Žagariai	K	115	59	56
Žiūkai	K	38	20	18
Raitininkų ward (seniūnija)		919	448	471
Balynaitė	VS	0	0	0
Bugonys	K	30	12	18
Druskininkai	K	53	30	23
Ežerynas	K	5	4	1
Galintanka	K	10	7	3
Galintėnai	K	57	27	30
Jaujakaimis	K	12	5	7
Jociūnai	K	0	0	0
Klepočiai	K	37	18	19
Lizdai	K	15	8	7
Lydekininkai	K	23	9	14
Makniūnai	K	227	110	117
Meškasalis	K	87	37	50
Miežionys	K	10	5	5
Netiesos	K	0	0	0
Noškūnai	K	2	2	0
Pieriškiai	K	19	8	11
Piliakalnis	K	17	9	8
Raitininkai	K	24	12	12
Ryliškiai	K	205	100	105
Savilionys	K	28	13	15
Taručionys	K	9	5	4
Vabaliai	K	11	7	4
Valėniškės	K	18	10	8
Veismūnai	K	17	8	9
Vertelkos	K	0	0	0
Živulčiškė	K	3	2	1
Simno ward (seniūnija)		3,880	1,882	1,998
Aleknonys	K	109	53	56
Angininkai	K	123	59	64
Atesninkai I	K	20	11	9
Atesninkai II	K	8	2	6
Ąžuoliniai	K	289	151	138
Bambininkai	K	32	18	14
Bažava	K	9	3	6
Buktininkai	K	1	0	1
Dingiškiai	K	18	9	9
Giluičiai	K	55	25	30
Gluosninkai	K	91	40	51
Gražuliai	K	39	18	21
Grinkiškiai	K	9	3	6
Kaimynai	K	17	7	10
Kalesninkai	K	113	54	59
Kavalčiukai	K	102	51	51
Kolonistai	K	34	14	20
Komisaruvka	K	46	20	26
Liepakojai	K	28	18	10
Litvančiškiai	K	7	3	4
Marinka	K	13	6	7
Mergalaukis	K	295	141	154
Metelytė	K	46	24	22
Navininkai	K	62	29	33
Ostampas	K	78	39	39
Pasimniai	K	9	6	3
Ponkiškiai	K	67	34	33
Radastai	K	15	9	6
Saulėnai	K	5	2	3
Simnas	M	1,514	729	785
Skituriai	K	42	20	22
Skovagaliai	K	27	14	13
Spernia	K	126	61	65
Struogiškės	K	0	0	0
Šarkiškiai	K	17	9	8
Verebiejai	K	327	156	171
Zailiai	K	8	4	4
Žuvintai	K	79	40	39

- Status: M, MST - city, town / K, GST - village / VS - steading
