= Mikalauskas =

- Lithuanian surname
- m.: Mikalauskas
- f.: (unmarried): Mikalauskaitė (see lt:Mikalauskaitė)
- f.: (married): Mikalauskienė
- Origin: given name Mykolas

Mikalauskas is a Lithuanian-language surname. Notable people with the surname include:

- Arūnas Mikalauskas, Lithuanian basketball player
- Laurynas Mikalauskas, Lithuanian professional basketball player
- Vidas Mikalauskas, Lithuanian politician
- Neringa Mikalauskienė, birth name of Neringa Dangvydė, Lithuanian writer, poet, book illustrator, and literary critic

== See also ==
- Mikułowski
