= Balbutai =

- Village
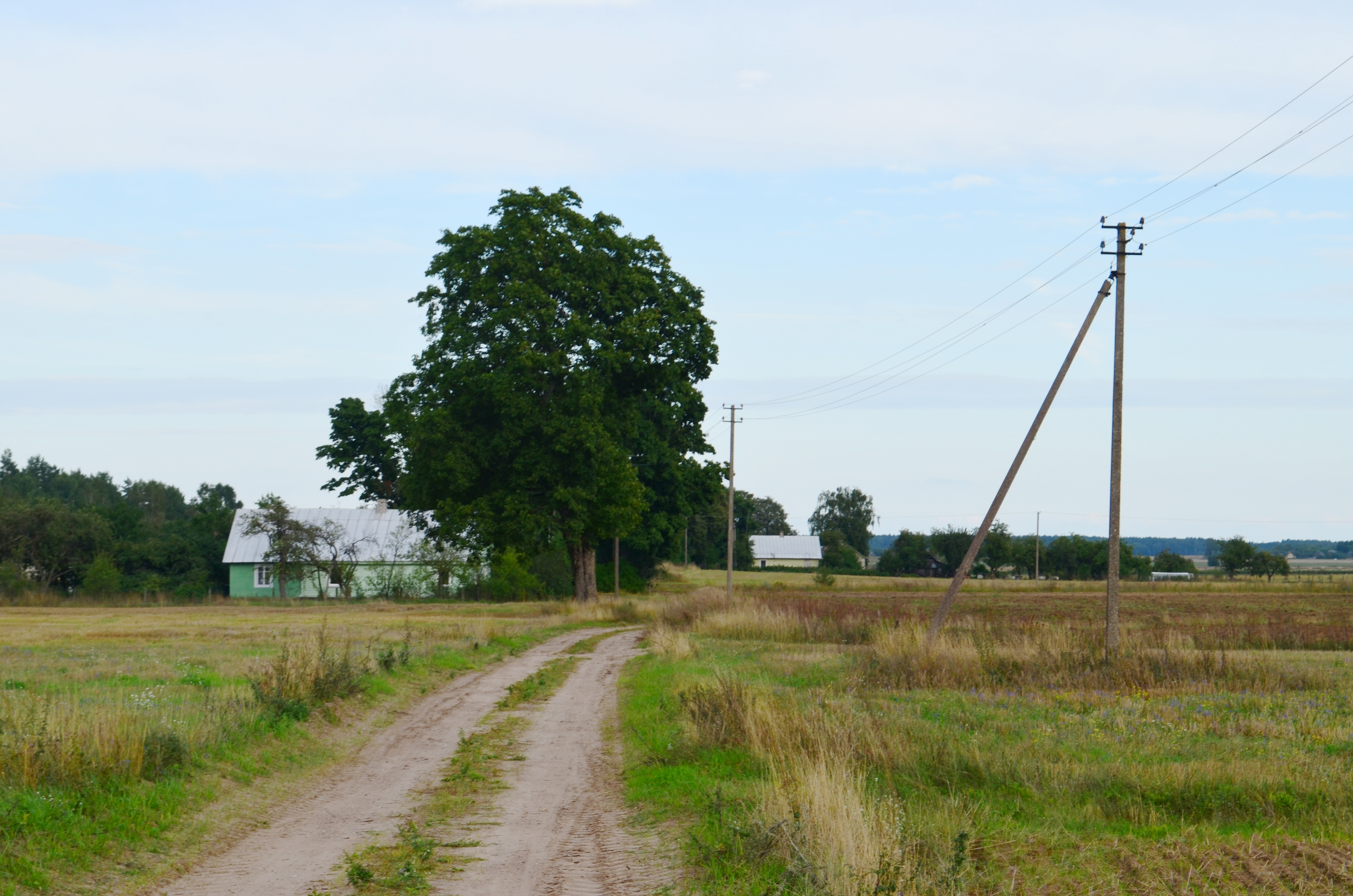
- Interactive map of Balbutai
- Location in Varėna district municipality Balbutai (Lithuania)
- Coordinates: 53°58′08″N 24°43′52″E
- Country: Lithuania
- County: Alytus County
- Municipality: Varėna
- Eldership: Kaniavos (Kaniava)

Population (2011 Census)
  - Total: 39
- Time zone: UTC+2 (EET)
  - Summer (DST): UTC+3 (EEST)

Balbutai is a village in Kaniavos eldership, Varėna district municipality, Alytus County, southeastern Lithuania. According to the 2001 census, the village has a population of 61 people. At the 2011 census, the population was 39.

== Etymology ==
The name Balbutai comes from personal names Lithuanian: Bal̃butas, Balbatà, Balbãtas and Belarusian: Бoлбат which descend from Belarusian: бoлбач 'a chatterbox, a babbler'.
