= Raitininkai Eldership =

Eldership of Lithuania

The Raitininkai Eldership (Lithuanian: Raitininkų seniūnija) is an eldership of Lithuania, located in the Alytus District Municipality. In 2021 its population was 748.
