= Butrimonys Eldership (Alytus) =

Eldership of Lithuania

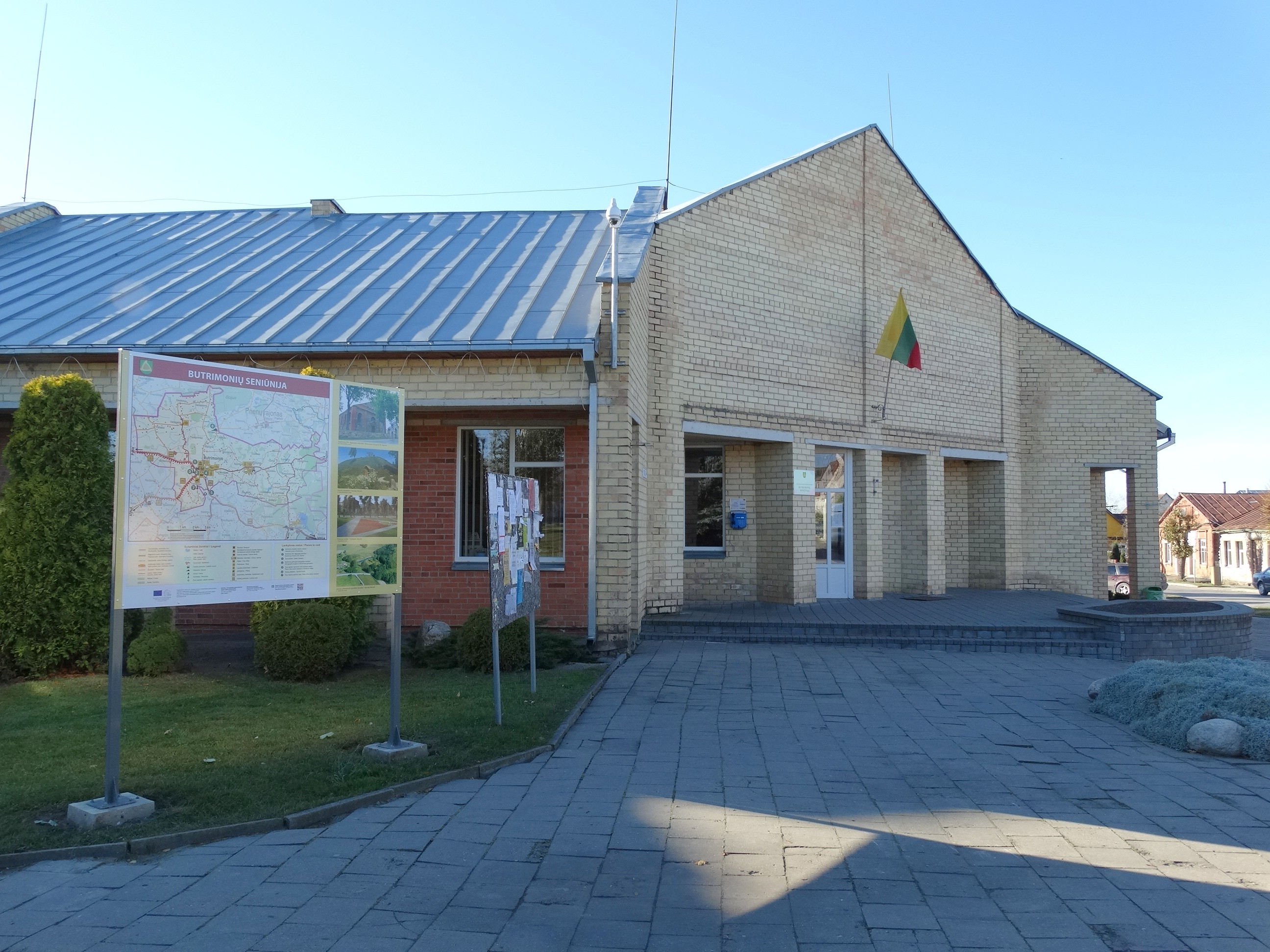

The Butrimonys Eldership (Lithuanian: Butrimonių seniūnija) is an eldership of Lithuania, located in the Alytus District Municipality. In 2021 its population was 1625.
