= Krokšlys =

- Village
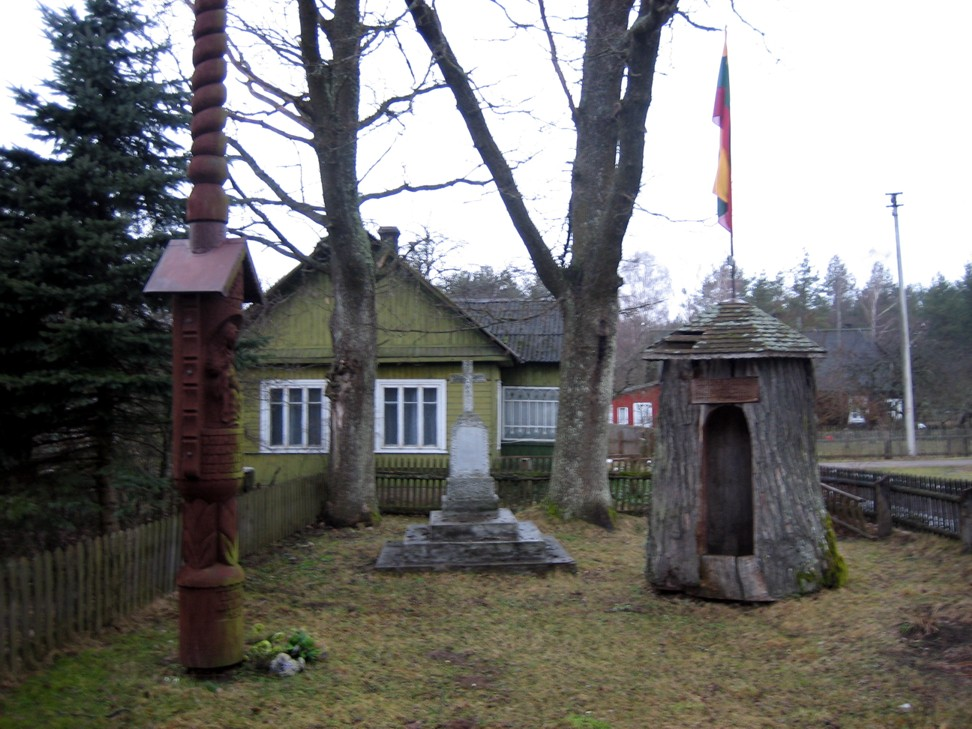

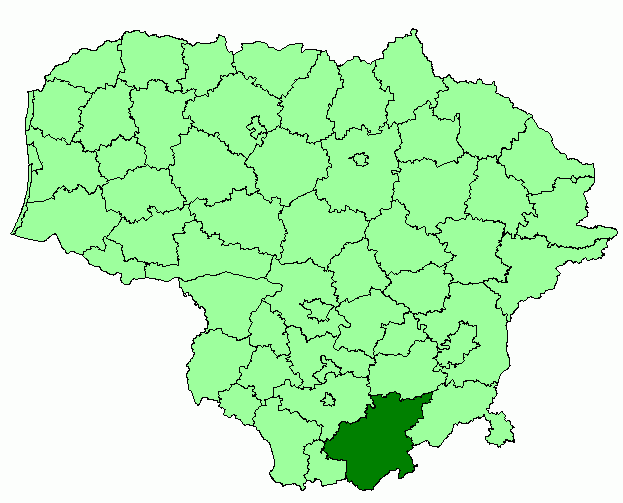
- Location in Varėna district municipality Location of Varėna district in Lithuania
- Coordinates: 54°02′10″N 24°37′30″E
- Country: Lithuania
- County: Alytus County
- Municipality: Varėna
- Eldership: Kaniavos (Kaniava)

Population (2011 Census)
  - Total: 50
- Time zone: UTC+2 (EET)
  - Summer (DST): UTC+3 (EEST)

Krokšlys is a village in Kaniavos eldership, Varėna district municipality, Alytus County, southeastern Lithuania. According to the 2001 census, the village had a population of 78 people. At the 2011 census, the population was 50.

== Etymology ==
The village consists of two parts called Krokšlys and Šumas. Their both meaning is similar, only one name is Lithuanian (from kriokšlỹs 'a little waterfall', krokšlỹs, kriokšlỹs 'one who/which snores, crepitates') another is Belarusian (from шум 'a noise, murmur, tear'). Supposedly, it resonates a murmuring flow of the Ūla River.
