= Bagočiai =

- Village
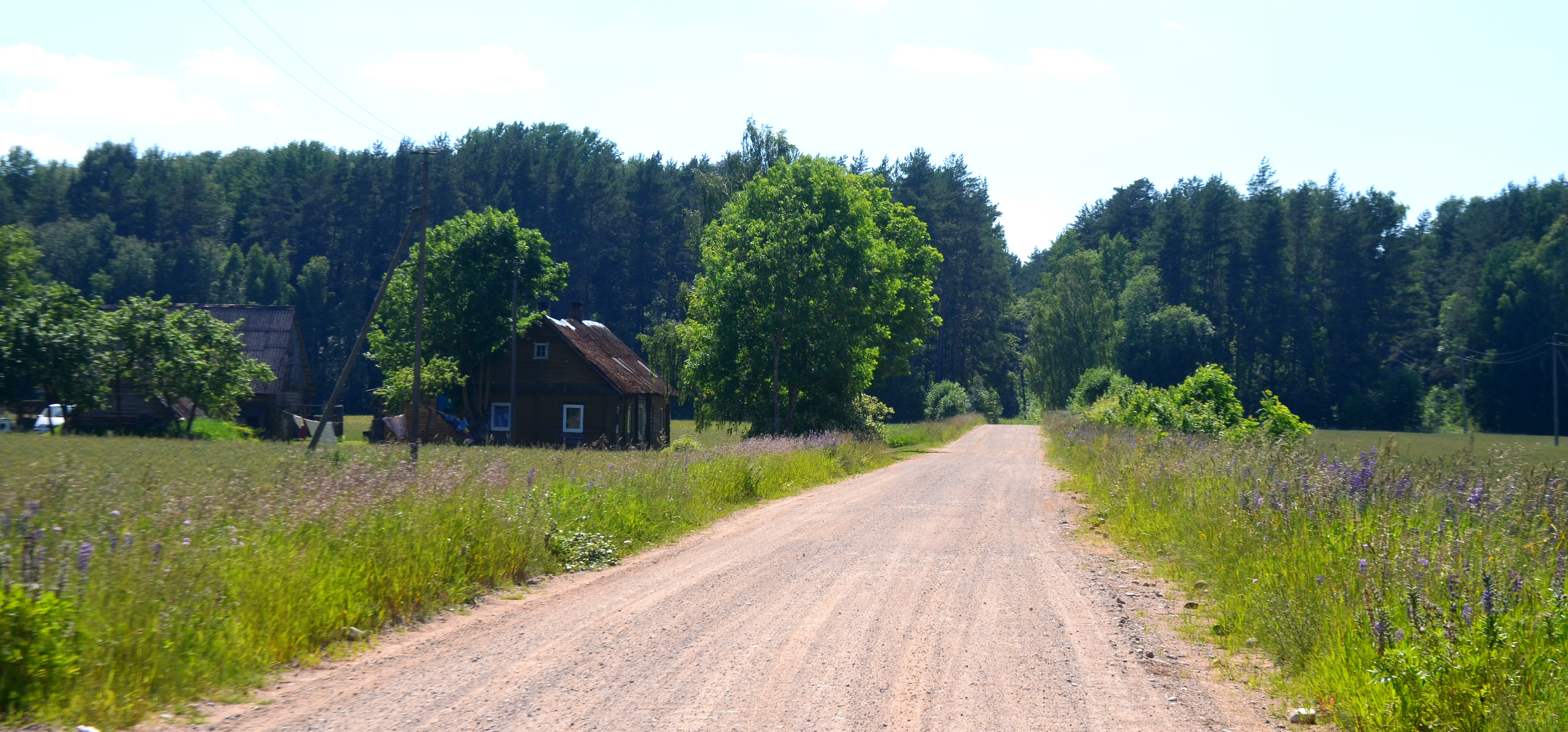

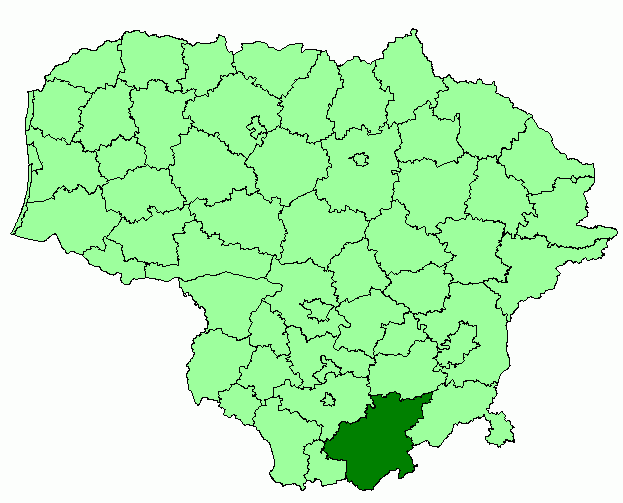
- Location in Varėna district municipality Location of Varėna district in Lithuania
- Coordinates: 54°06′40″N 24°44′31″E
- Country: Lithuania
- County: Alytus County
- Municipality: Varėna
- Eldership: Kaniavos (Kaniava)

Population (2011 Census)
  - Total: 12
- Time zone: UTC+2 (EET)
  - Summer (DST): UTC+3 (EEST)

Bagočiai is a village in Kaniavos eldership, Varėna district municipality, Alytus County, southeastern Lithuania. At the 2001 census, the village had a population of 17. At the 2011 census, the population was 12.

== Etymology ==
The name Bagočiai comes from a personal name Bagõčius or directly from common names Lithuanian: bagočius, Belarusian: багач, бoгач which mean 'a rich man'.
