= Paąžuolė (Varėna) =

- Village
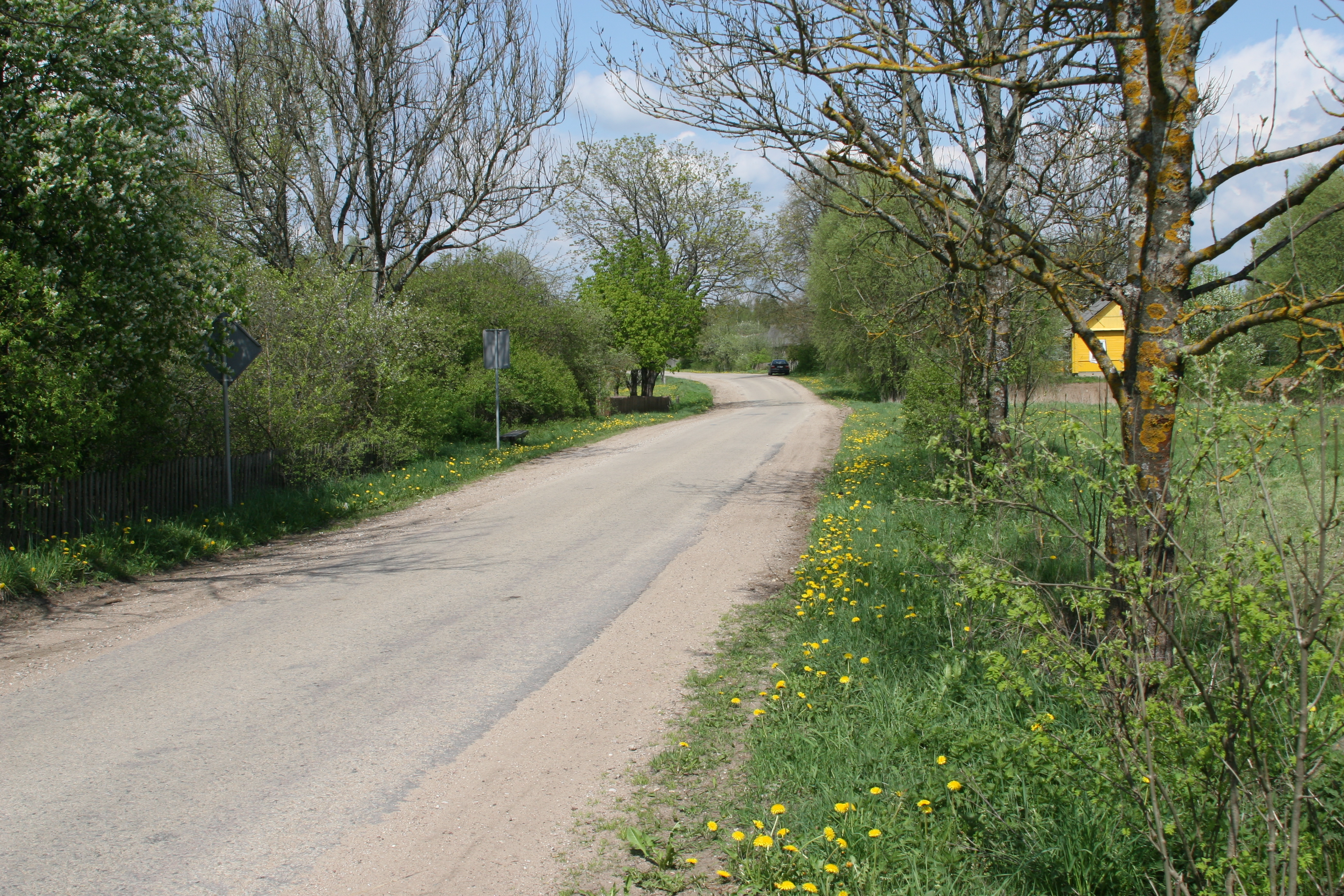

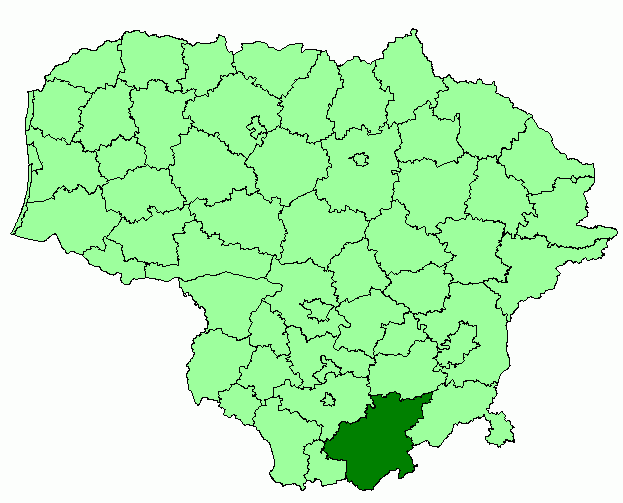
- Location in Varėna district municipality Location of Varėna district in Lithuania
- Coordinates: 54°04′01″N 24°45′40″E
- Country: Lithuania
- County: Alytus
- Municipality: Varėna
- Eldership: Kaniavos (Kaniava)

Population (2011 Census)
  - Total: 13
- Time zone: UTC+2 (EET)
  - Summer (DST): UTC+3 (EEST)

Paąžuolė is a village in Kaniava eldership, Varėna district municipality, Alytus County, southeastern Lithuania. According to the 2001 census, the village had a population of 25 people. At the 2011 census, the population was 13.

The village was likely established at the end of the 18th century after the massive forest cuts.

Between World War I and World War II, Rytas Elementary School was situated in the village.

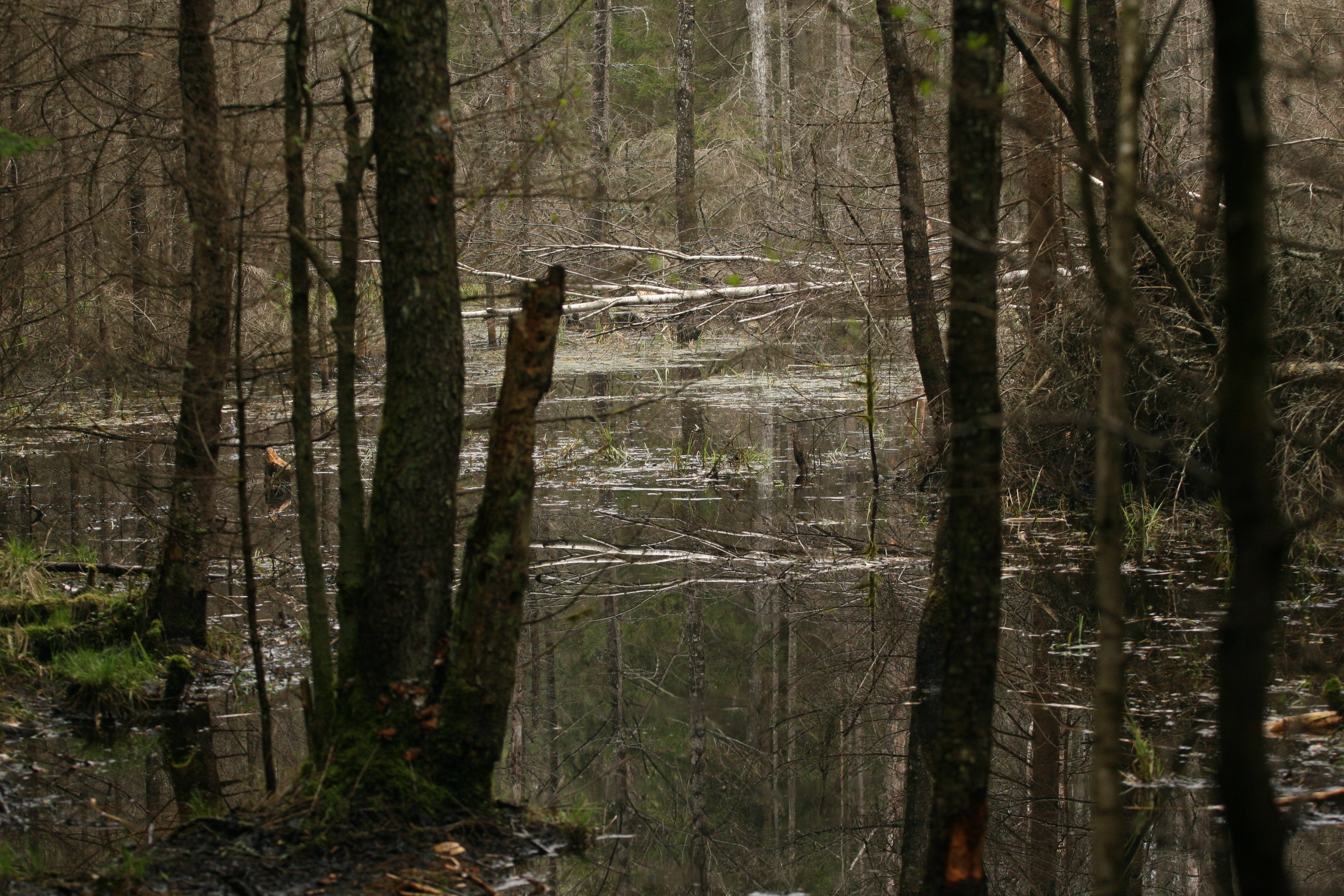
River Kaniavėlė close to Paąžuolė

== Etymology ==
The name Paąžuolė comes from the word Lithuanian: ąžuolas ('oak tree') and means 'a place under/by oaks'. The village is mentioned as Polish: Poddębie, Poddębe, Russian: Поддембе in the earlier sources (with the same meaning, i. e. Polish: dęby, dębno 'oaks, oak grove'), so it isn't clear Lithuanian or Slavic name is earlier.
