= Jasauskai =

- Village
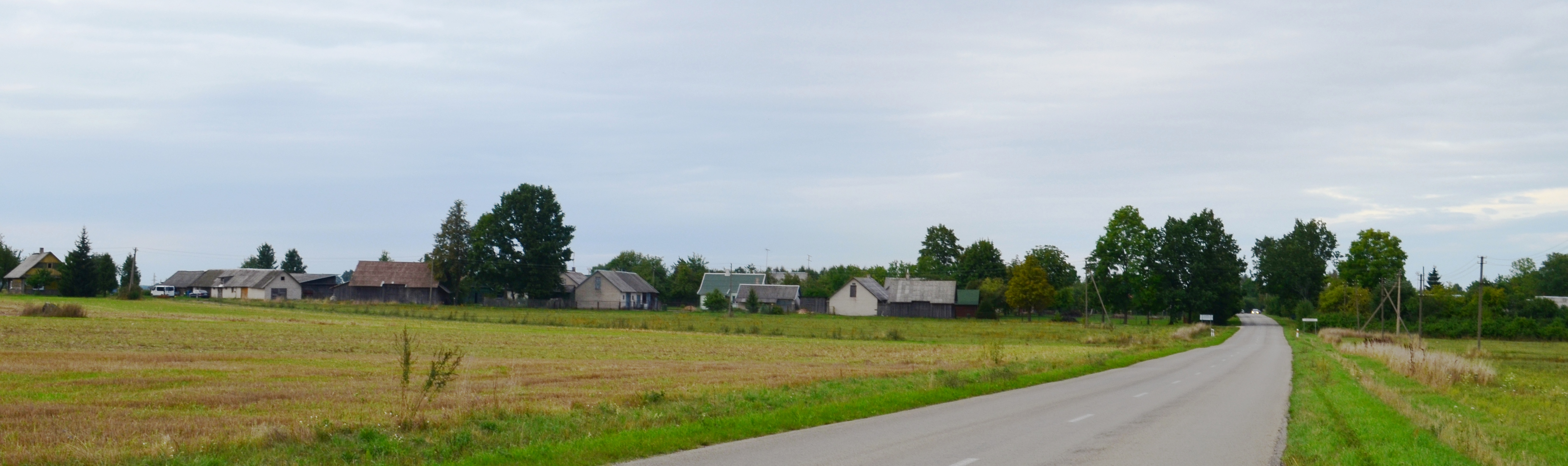

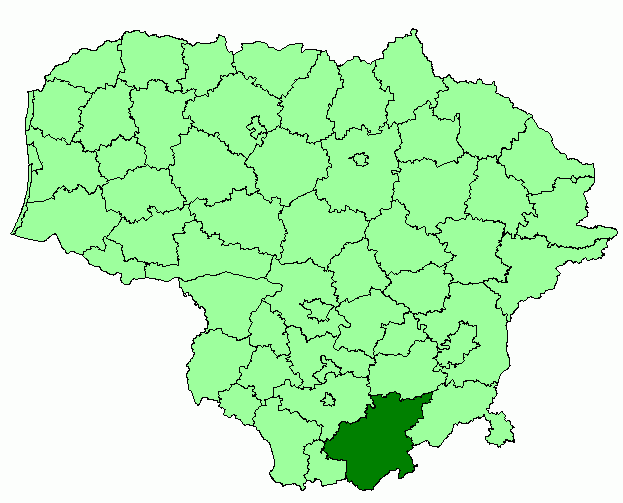
- Location in Varėna district municipality Location of Varėna district in Lithuania
- Coordinates: 54°06′11″N 24°45′11″E
- Country: Lithuania
- County: Alytus County
- Municipality: Varėna
- Eldership: Kaniavos (Kaniava)

Population (2011 Census)
  - Total: 60
- Time zone: UTC+2 (EET)
  - Summer (DST): UTC+3 (EEST)

Jasauskai is a village in Kaniavos eldership, Varėna district municipality, Alytus County, southeastern Lithuania. According to the 2001 census, the village has a population of 66 people. At the 2011 census, the population was 60.

== Etymology ==
The name Jasauskai (earlier known as Polish: Jasowszczyzna) comes from the personal name Jasáuskas which is a form of Belarusian name Яcь (a clipping for Ivan).
