= Daugai Eldership =

Eldership of Lithuania

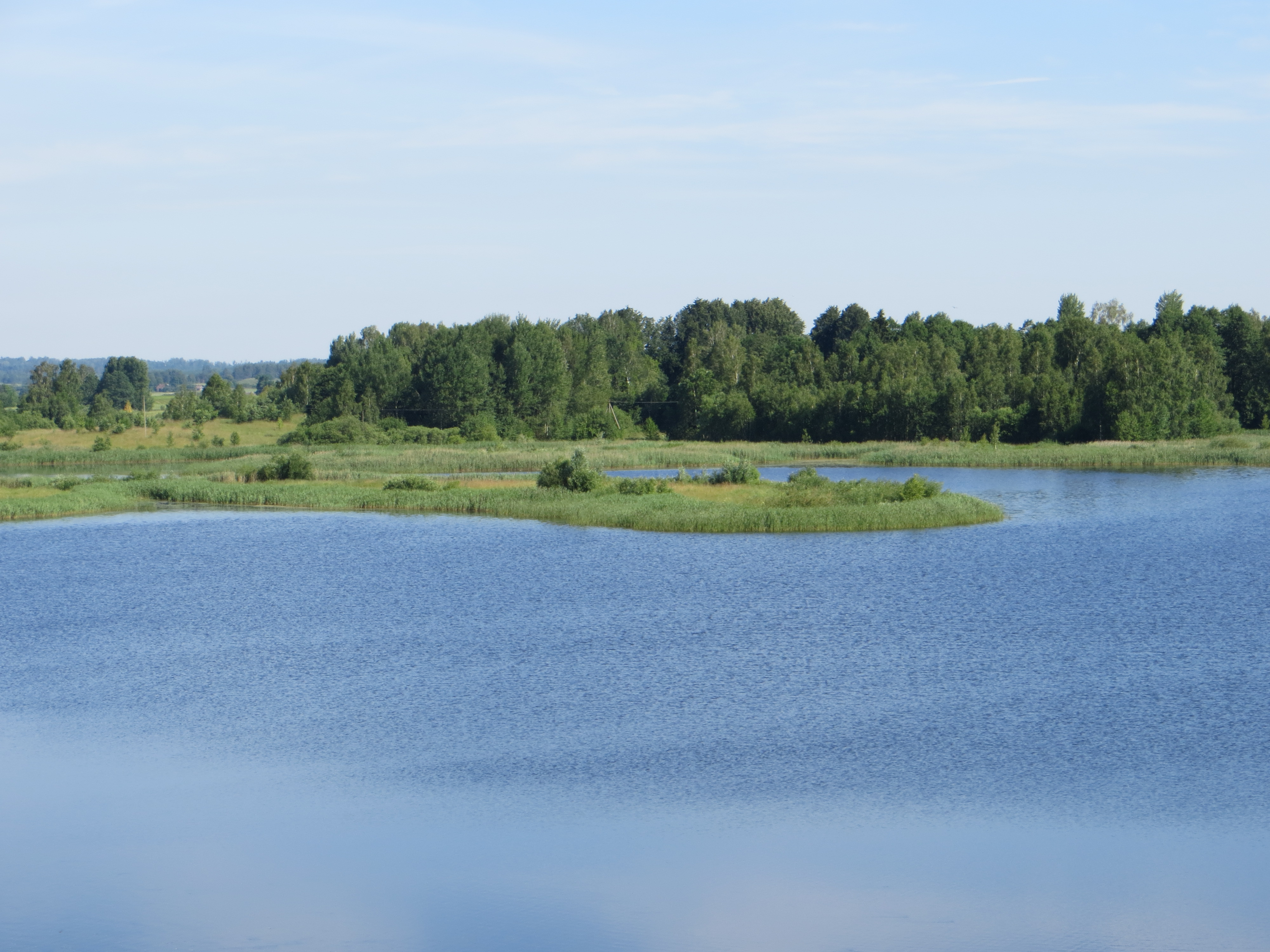

The Daugai Eldership (Lithuanian: Daugų seniūnija) is an eldership of Lithuania, located in the Alytus District Municipality. In 2021 its population was 2725.
