= Dubičiai =

- Village
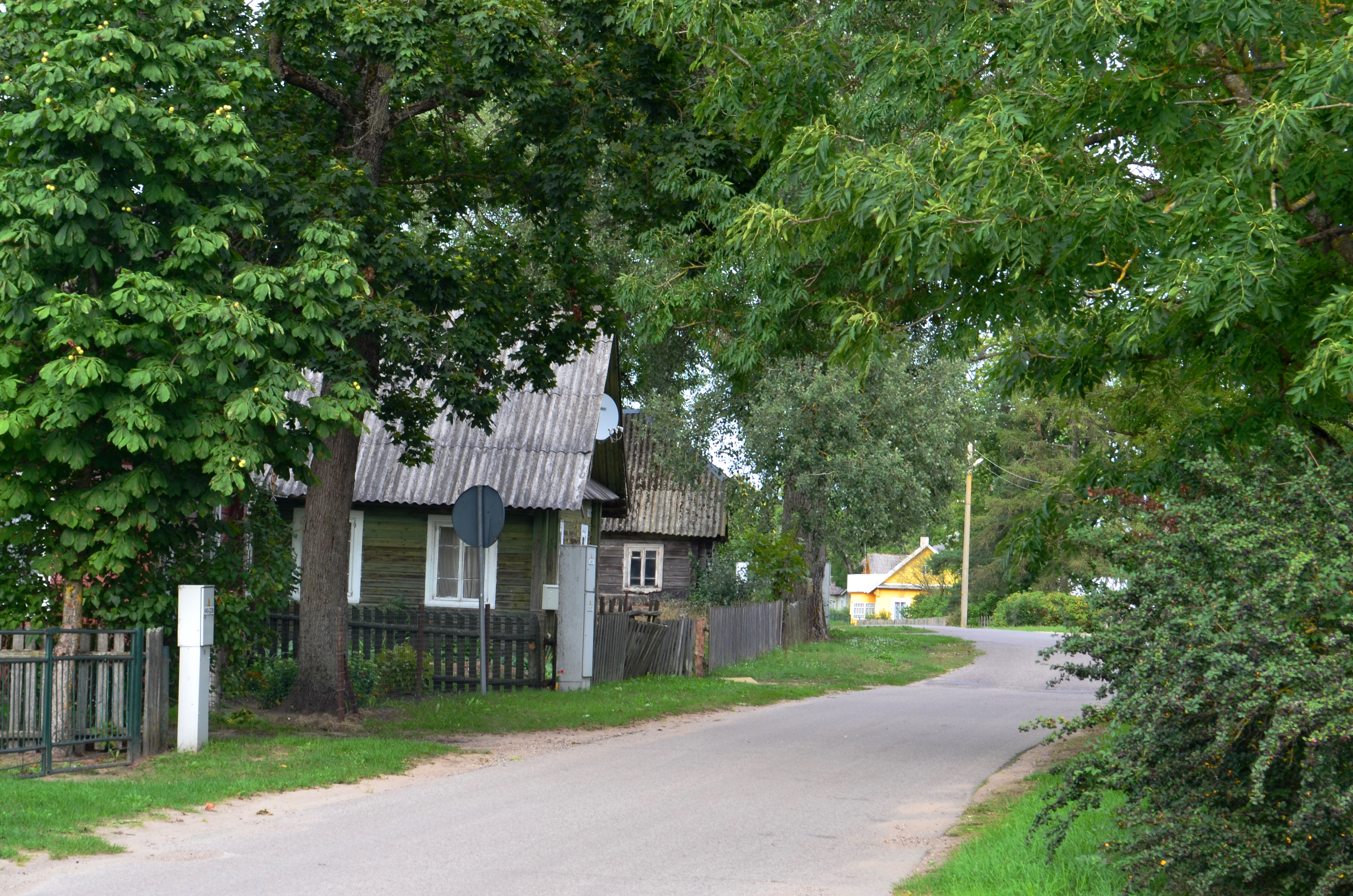

- Seal

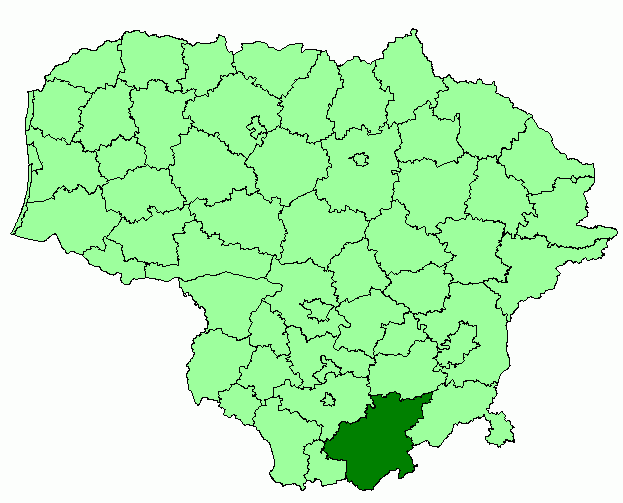
- Location in Varėna district municipality Location of Varėna district in Lithuania
- Coordinates: 54°01′08″N 24°44′49″E
- Country: Lithuania
- County: Alytus County
- Municipality: Varėna
- Eldership: Kaniavos (Kaniava)

Population (2021 Census)
  - Total: 216
- Time zone: UTC+2 (EET)
  - Summer (DST): UTC+3 (EEST)

Dubičiai is a village in Kaniavos eldership, Varėna district municipality, Alytus County, southeastern Lithuania. According to the 2001 census, the village has a population of 388 people. At the 2011 census, the population was 291.

Dubičiai was the location of one of many Roman Catholic churches where the priests had to know the Lithuanian language according to the Grand Duke of Lithuania Alexander Jagiellon in 1501

Dubičiai village is located c. 32 kilometres (20 mi) from Varėna, 27 kilometres (17 mi) from Marcinkonys, 1 kilometre (0.62 mi) from Mantotai (the nearest settlement), 2 kilometres (1.2 mi) from the Belarusian border.

== Etymology ==
The name Dubičiai probably comes from the name of currently drained Dubas Lake which correspondingly is from the Lithuanian root dub- meaning 'to cave, to sink' (as duobė 'a pit', duburys 'a waterhole'). There is also Slavic personal names Дубичь, Дубич, Дубіч and Lithuanian one Dubiẽtis but they may descend from the village name.
