= Punia Eldership =

Eldership of Lithuania

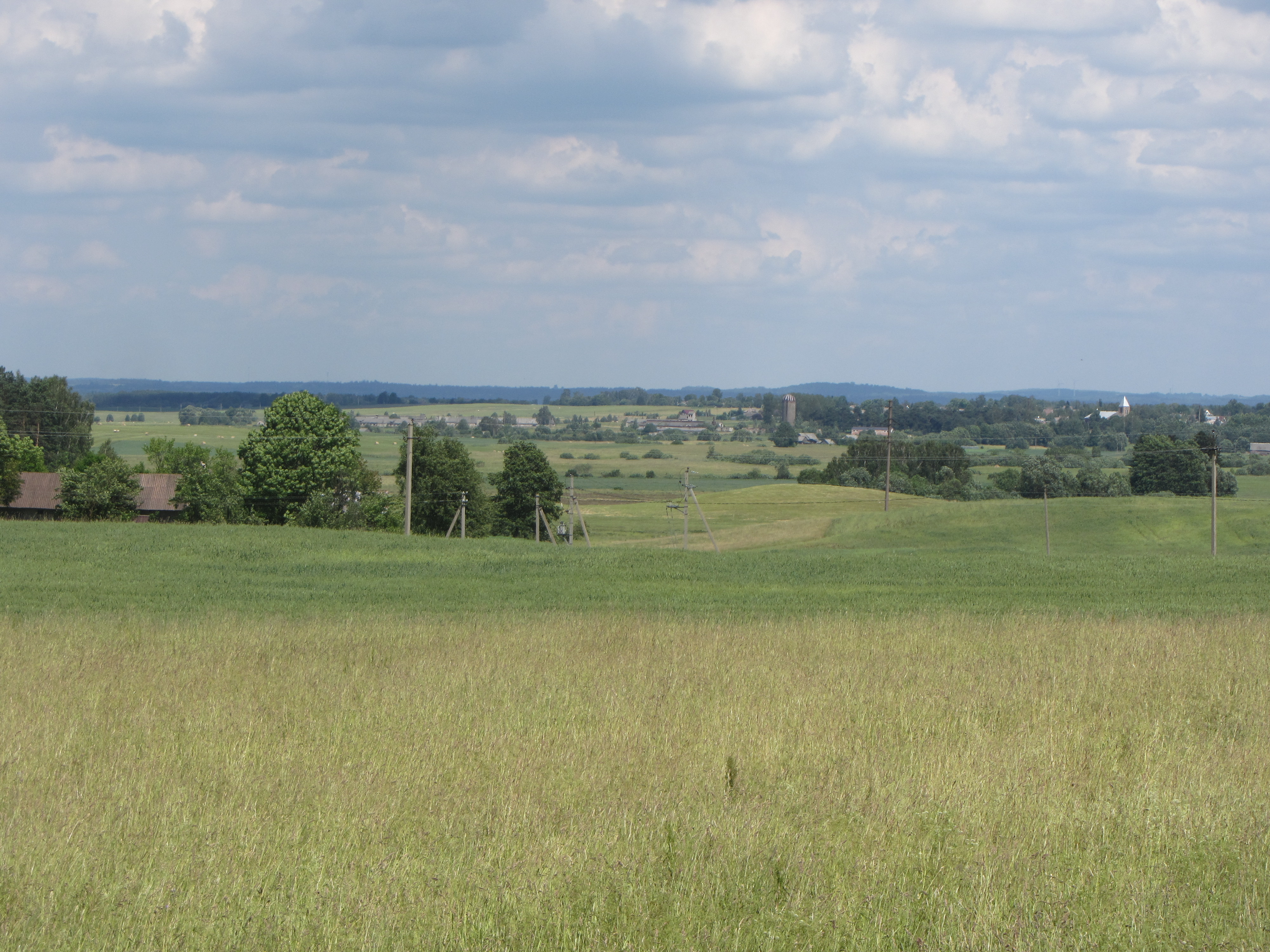
Punios sen., Lithuania

The Punia Eldership (Lithuanian: Punios seniūnija) is an eldership of Lithuania, located in the Alytus District Municipality. In 2021 its population was 2362.
