= Noškūnai (Varėna) =

- Village
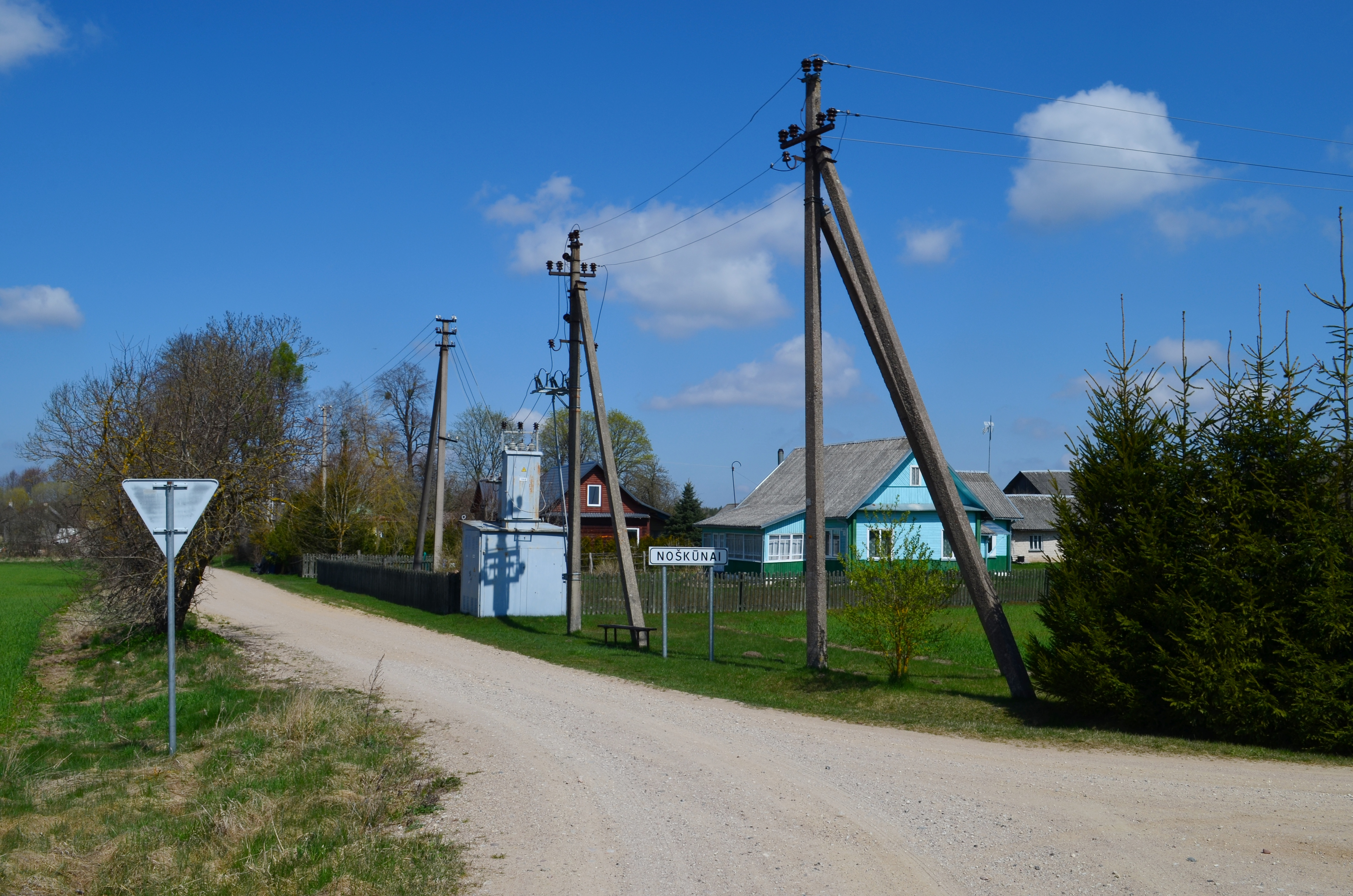

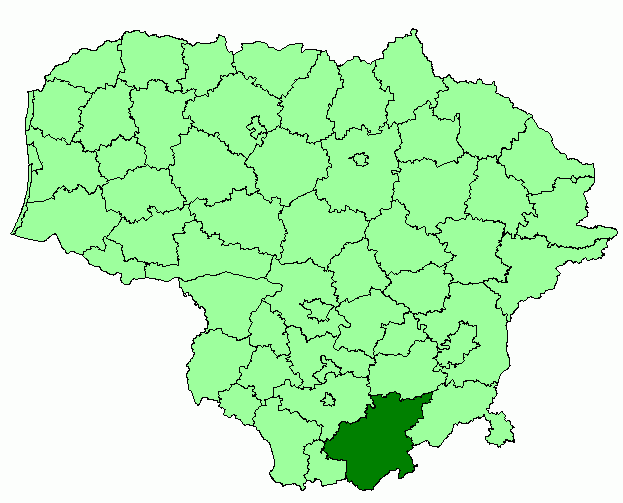
- Location in Varėna district municipality Location of Varėna district in Lithuania
- Coordinates: 54°07′30″N 24°38′49″E
- Country: Lithuania
- County: Alytus County
- Municipality: Varėna
- Eldership: Kaniavos (Kaniava)

Population (2011 Census)
  - Total: 41
- Time zone: UTC+2 (EET)
  - Summer (DST): UTC+3 (EEST)

Noškūnai is a village in Kaniavos eldership, Varėna district municipality, Alytus County, southeastern Lithuania. According to the 2001 census, the village had a population of 61 people. At the 2011 census, the population was 41.

== Etymology ==
The name Noškūnai comes from the personal name Noškūnas or Naškūnas which originates from Belorussian personal names Нашко, Нашкевiч.
