= Ūdrija =

- Village
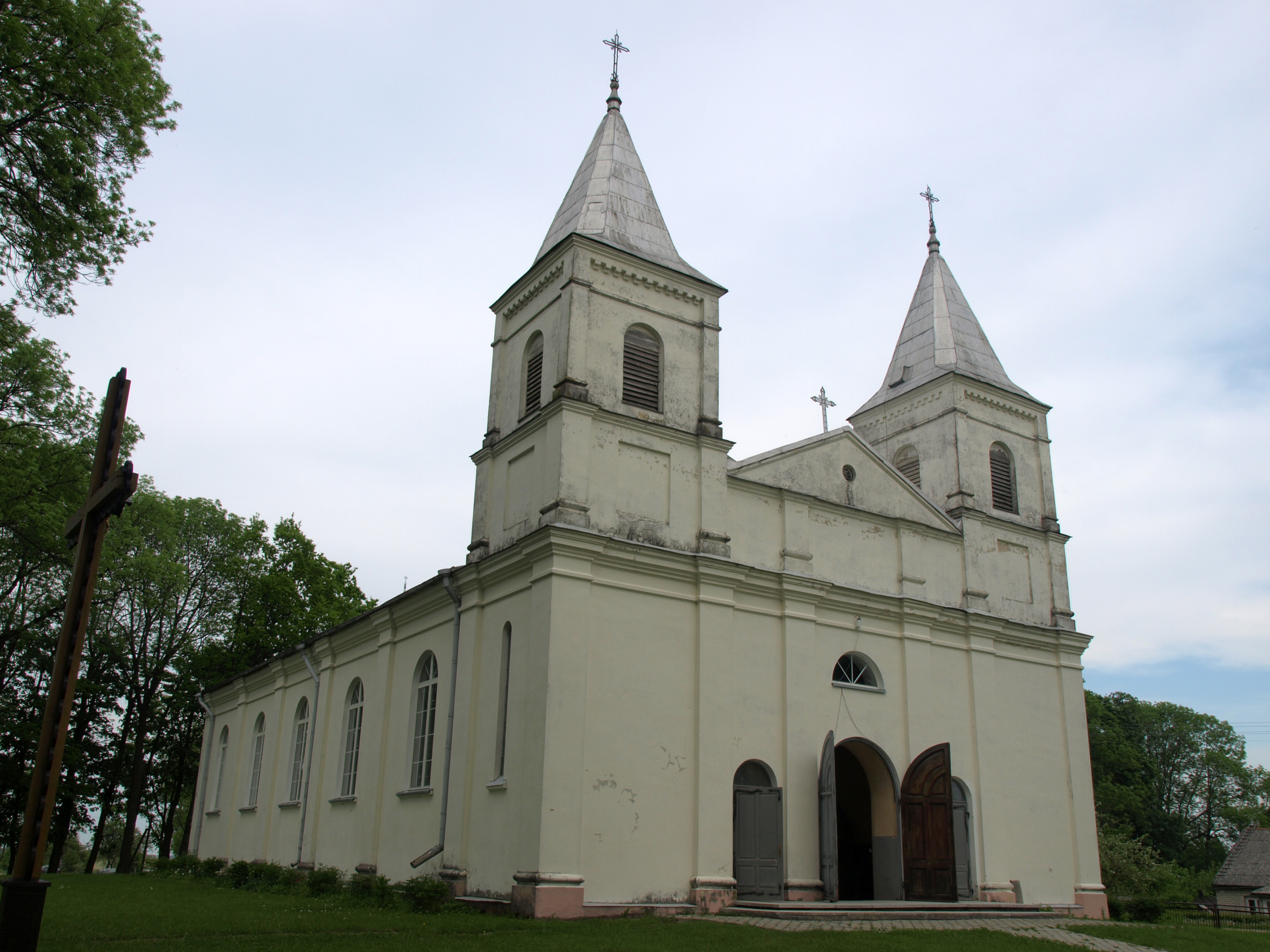

- Location within Lithuania
- Coordinates: 54°26′20″N 23°52′40″E
- Country: Lithuania
- County: Alytus County
- Municipality: Alytus

Population (2001)
  - Total: 453
- Time zone: UTC+2 (EET)
  - Summer (DST): UTC+3 (EEST)

Ūdrija is a village in Alytus district municipality, in Alytus County, in south Lithuania. According to the 2001 census, the village has a population of 453 people.

== Education ==
- Ūdrija primary school
