= Pivašiūnai =

- Village
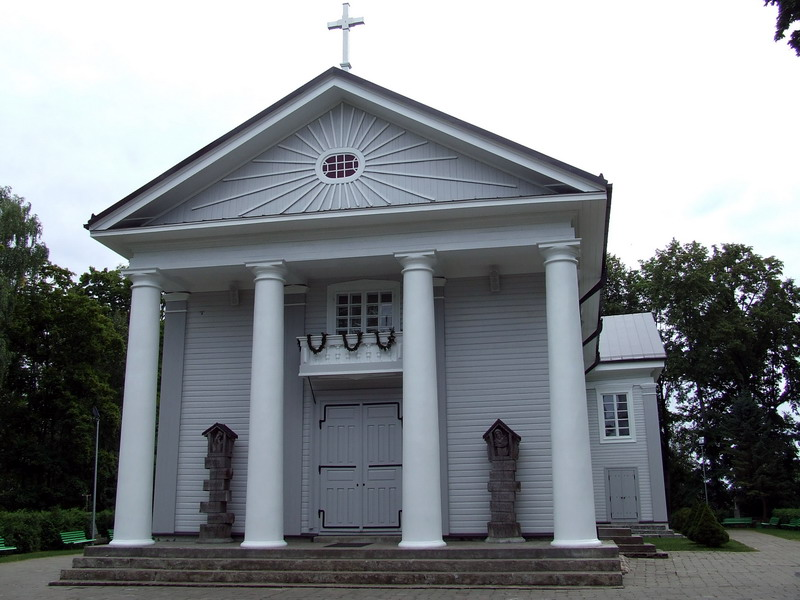

- Location in Lithuania
- Coordinates: 54°27′00″N 24°22′40″E
- Country: Lithuania
- Ethnographic region: Dzūkija
- County: Alytus County
- Municipality: Alytus district municipality
- Elderships: Pivašiūnai eldership

Population (2021)
  - Total: 256
- Time zone: UTC+2 (EET)
  - Summer (DST): UTC+3 (EEST)

Pivašiūnai is a village in Alytus district municipality, in Alytus County, in southeastern Lithuania. According to the 2021 census, the village has a population of 256 people.

Pivašiūnai village is located c. 24 kilometres (15 mi) from Alytus, 76 kilometres (47 mi) from Vilnius and 2 kilometres (1.2 mi) from Bundžiai (the nearest settlement).
