= Panočiai =

- Village
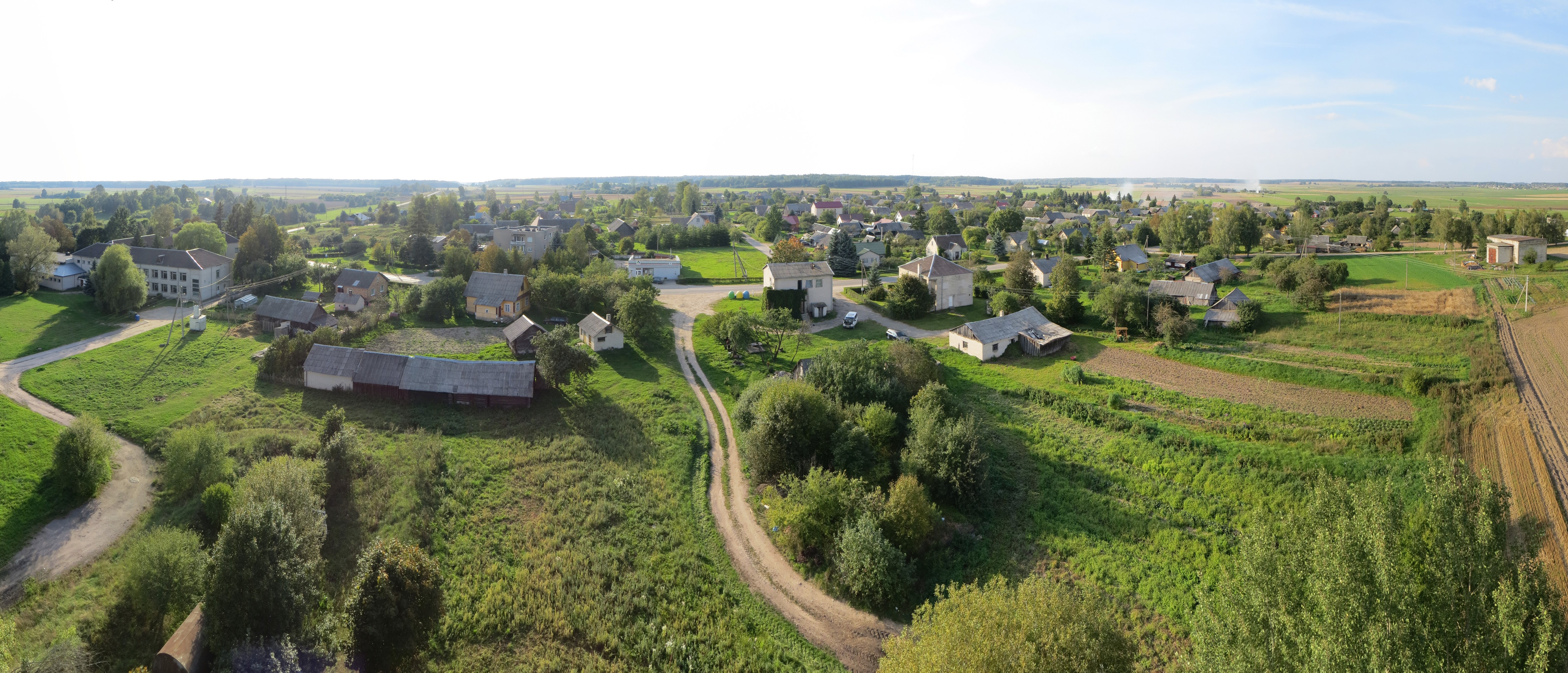

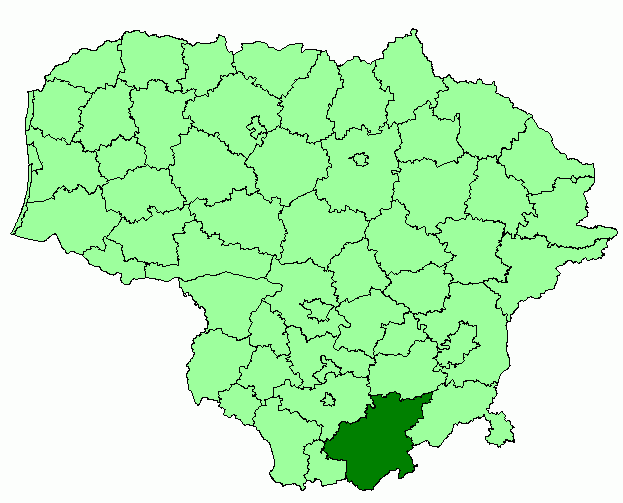
- Location in Varėna district municipality Location of Varėna district in Lithuania
- Coordinates: 54°07′08″N 24°45′50″E
- Country: Lithuania
- County: Alytus
- Municipality: Varėna
- Eldership: Kaniavos (Kaniava)

Population (2011 Census)
  - Total: 284
- Time zone: UTC+2 (EET)
  - Summer (DST): UTC+3 (EEST)

Panočiai (formerly Polish: Ponacza, Russian: Понача) is a village in Kaniavos eldership, Varėna district municipality, Alytus County, southeastern Lithuania. According to the 2001 census, the village had a population of 320 people. At the 2011 census, the population was 284.

== Etymology ==
The name Panočiai comes from the name of the Nočia River (i. e. means 'a place by the Nočia').
