= Vidas Mikalauskas =

Lithuanian politician (born 1955)

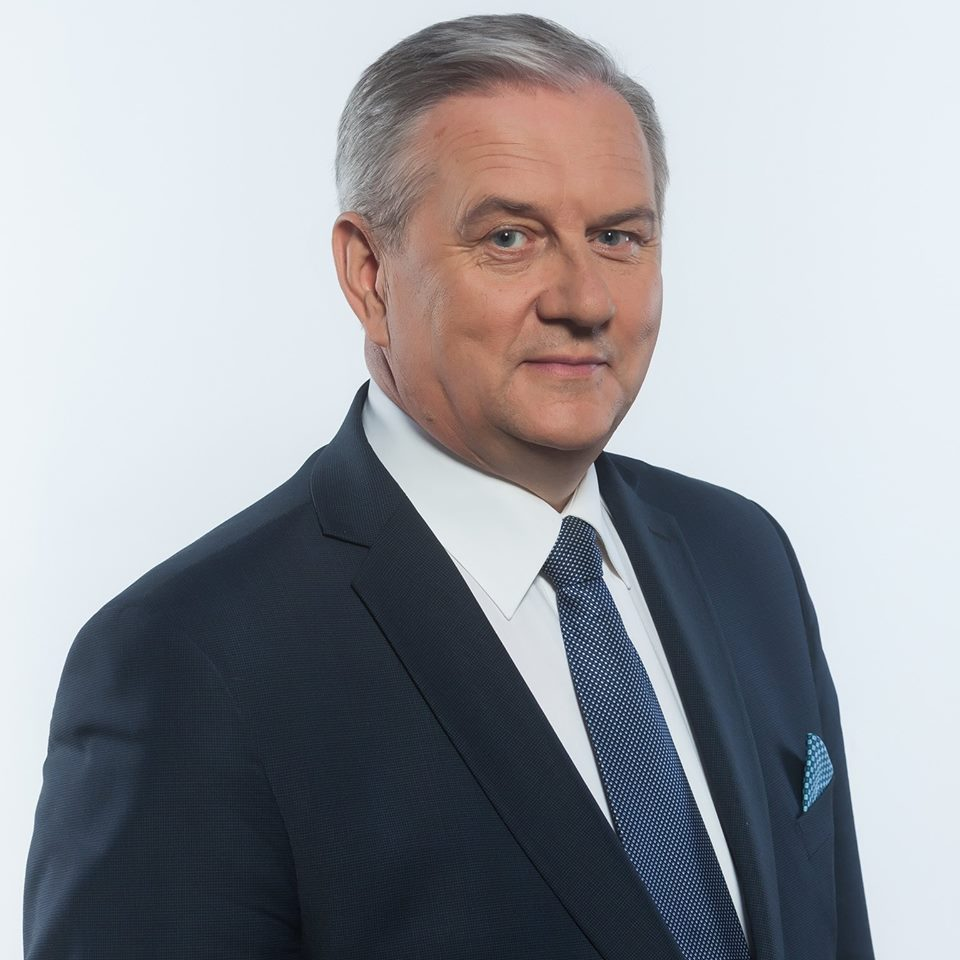

Member of the Parliament of Lithuania
- Incumbent
- Assumed office 29 June 2015

Personal details
- Born: 10 August 1955 (age 71) Krokialaukis, Lithuania
- Party: Social Democratic Party
- Education: Lithuanian University of Educational Sciences

Vidas Mikalauskas (born 10 August 1955 in Krokialaukis, Lithuania) is a Lithuanian politician representing the Social Democratic Party. He was elected to the Parliament of Lithuania on 21 June 2015 in the constituency of Varėna-Eišiškės, after the previous MP Algis Kašėta was elected as Varėna district mayor. He started in the parliament on 29 June 2015.

Mikalauskas was a member of the Lithuanian Centre Party from 2005, before joining the Social Democratic Party in 2011.
