= Daugai =

- City
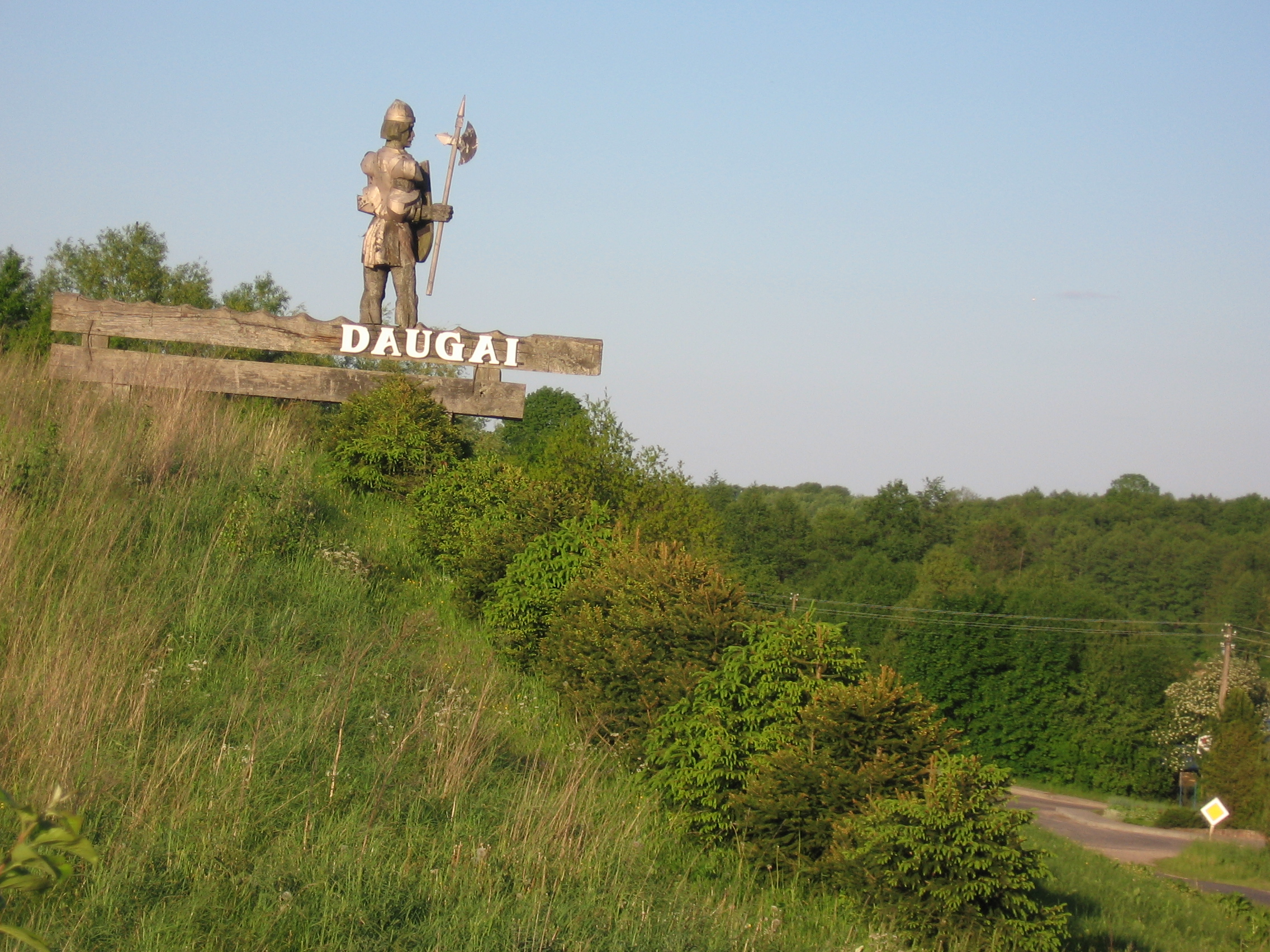

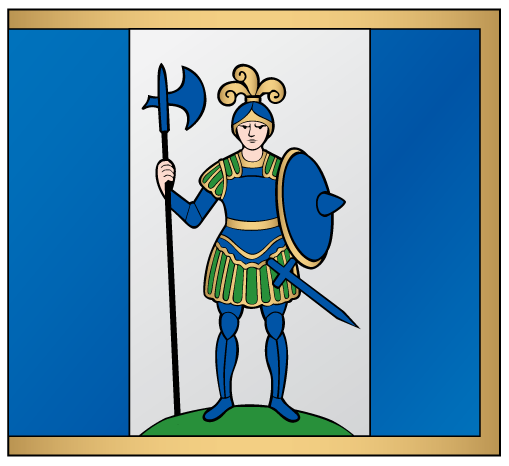
- Flag Coat of arms

- Location of Daugai
- Coordinates: 54°22′0″N 24°21′0″E
- Country: Lithuania
- Ethnographic region: Dzūkija
- County: Alytus County
- Municipality: Alytus district municipality
- Eldership: Daugai eldership
- Capital of: Daugai eldership
- First mentioned: 14th century
- Granted city rights: 1792

Population (2020)
  - Total: 928
- Time zone: UTC+2 (EET)
  - Summer (DST): UTC+3 (EEST)

Daugai (see also other names) is a small town in Alytus district municipality, Lithuania. It is situated some 20 kilometres (12 mi) to east from Alytus on the shores of Lake Didžiulis.

Daugai was the location of one of many Roman Catholic churches where the priests had to know the Lithuanian language according to the Grand Duke of Lithuania Alexander Jagiellon in 1501

The town has the Church of Divine Providence (Lithuanian: Dievo apvaizdos bažnyčia) dating from 1862, extant bazaar square, Daugai Vladas Mironas secondary school, art school, agricultural school, kindergarten Bangelė, post office, cultural center, library, polyclinic and hospital, many commercial enterprises.

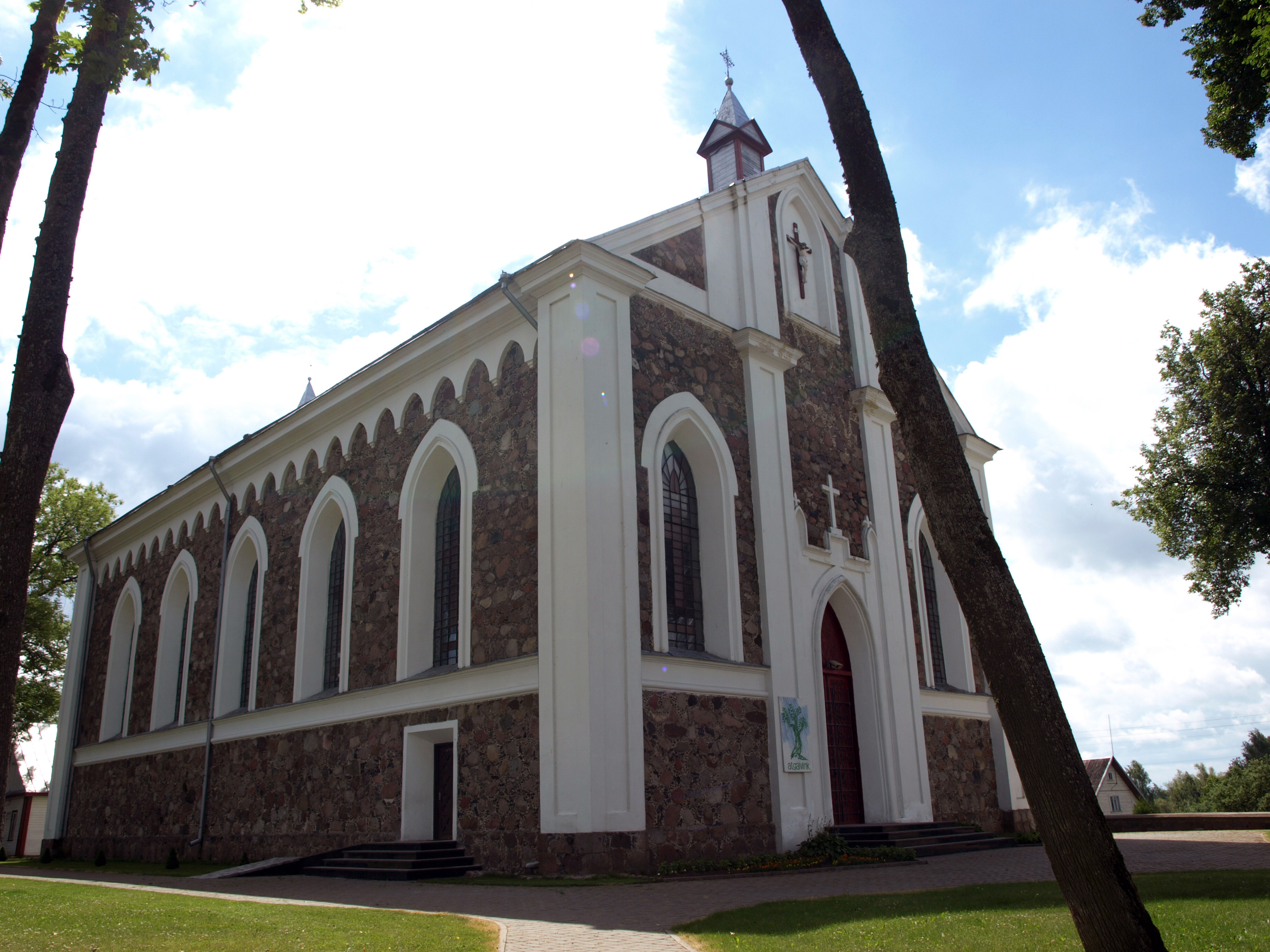
Church of God's Providence

== Names ==
Versions of the name in other languages include: Belarusian: Даўгi/Dauhi, Polish: Dougi or Dowgi, Russian: Дауги/Daugi, Yiddish: דויג/Doig.
