= Luksnėnai =

- Village
- Location within Lithuania
- Coordinates: 54°23′50″N 23°55′50″E
- Country: Lithuania
- County: Alytus County
- Municipality: Alytus

Population (2001)
  - Total: 614
- Time zone: UTC+2 (EET)
  - Summer (DST): UTC+3 (EEST)

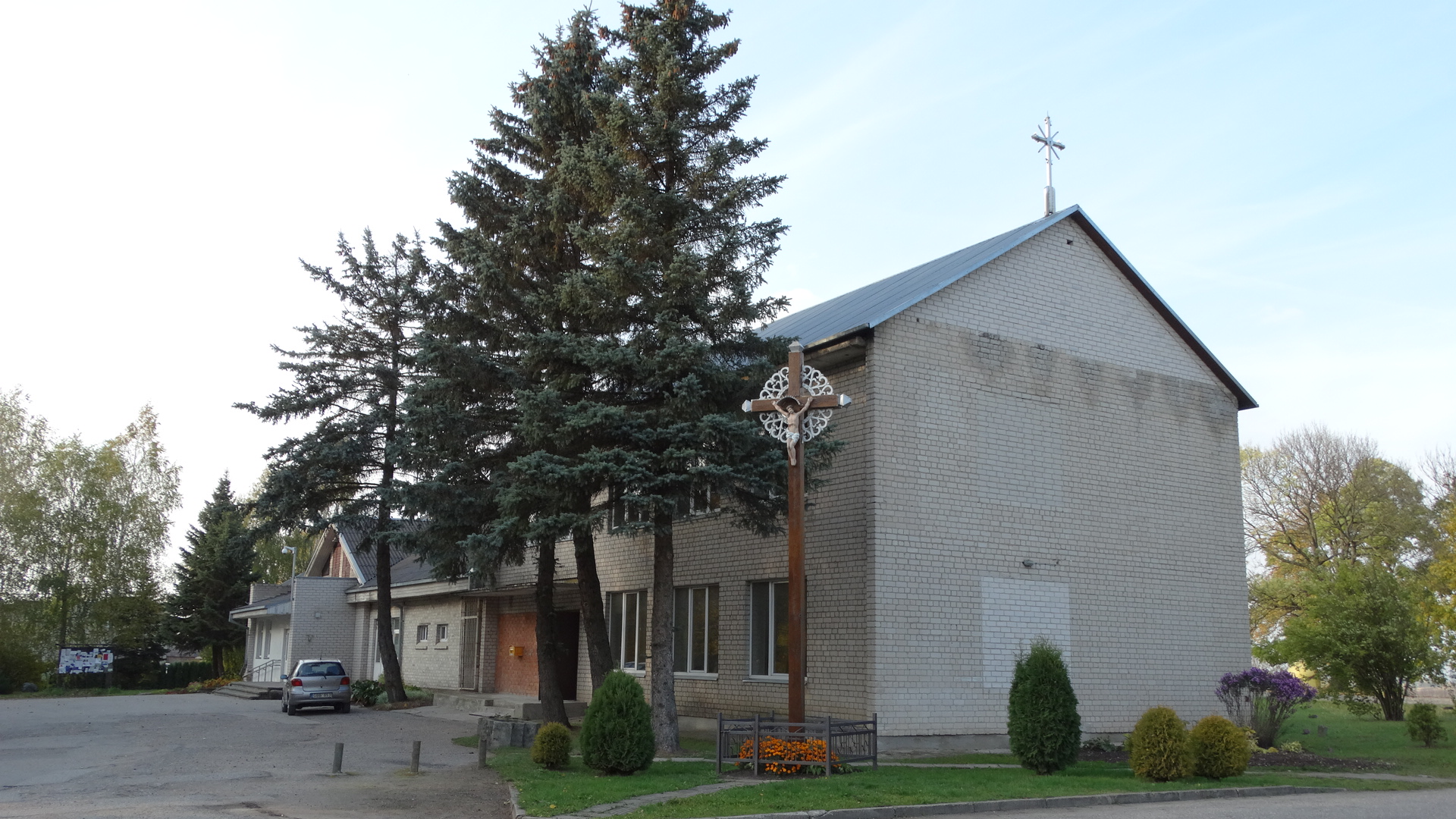

Luksnėnai is a village in Alytus district municipality, in Alytus County, in south Lithuania. According to the 2001 census, the village has a population of 614 people.
