= Miklusėnai =

- Village
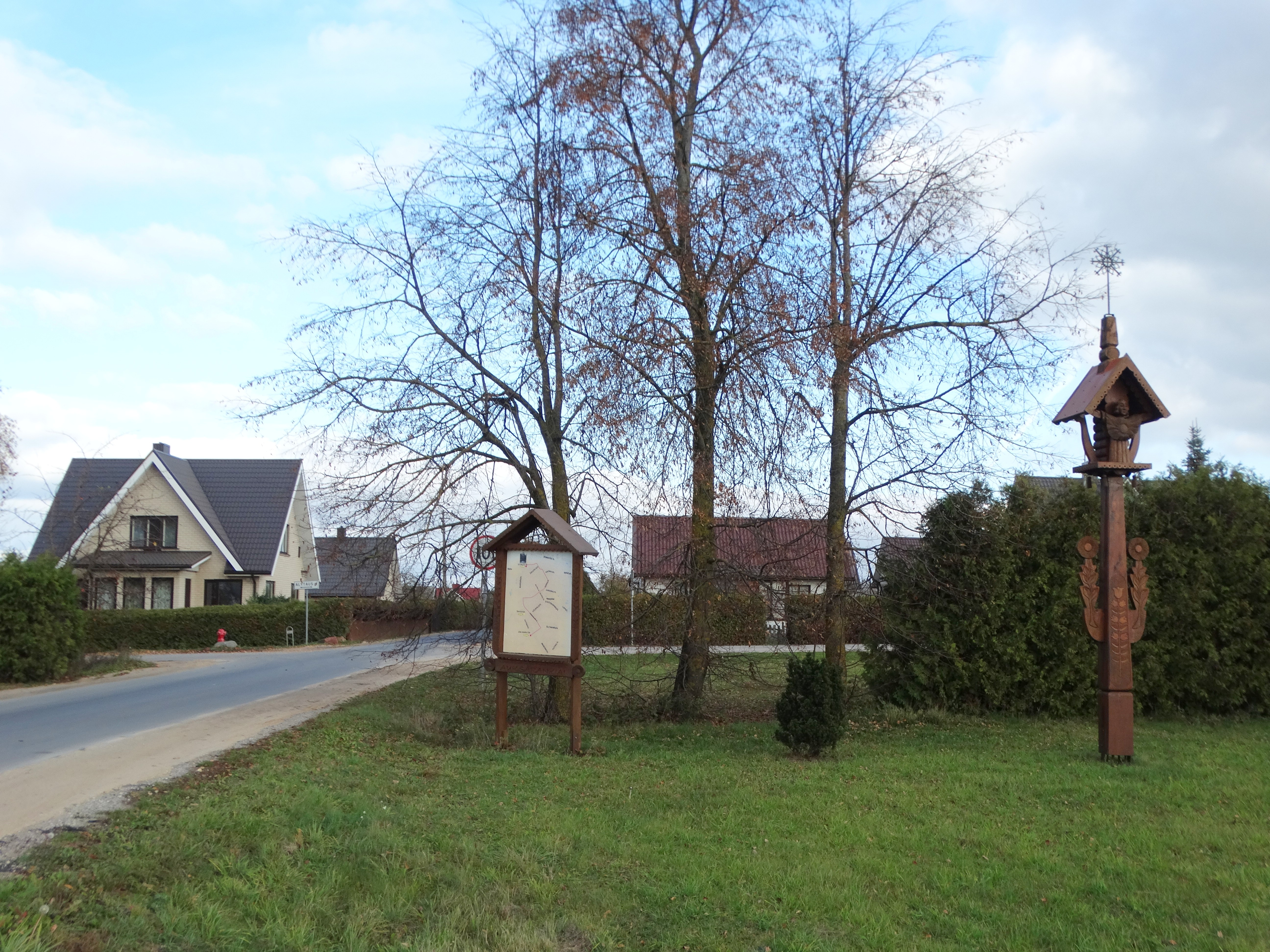
- Miklusėnai, Alytus district, Lithuania

- Location within Lithuania
- Coordinates: 54°26′30″N 23°59′50″E
- Country: Lithuania
- County: Alytus County
- Municipality: Alytus

Population (2001)
  - Total: 1,021
- Time zone: UTC+2 (EET)
  - Summer (DST): UTC+3 (EEST)

Miklusėnai is a village in Alytus district municipality, in Alytus County, in south Lithuania. According to the 2001 census, the village has a population of 1021 people. Village name first time mentioned in 1744.

== History ==
In historical sources Miklusėnai village is first mentioned in 1744.
