= Peršėkė =

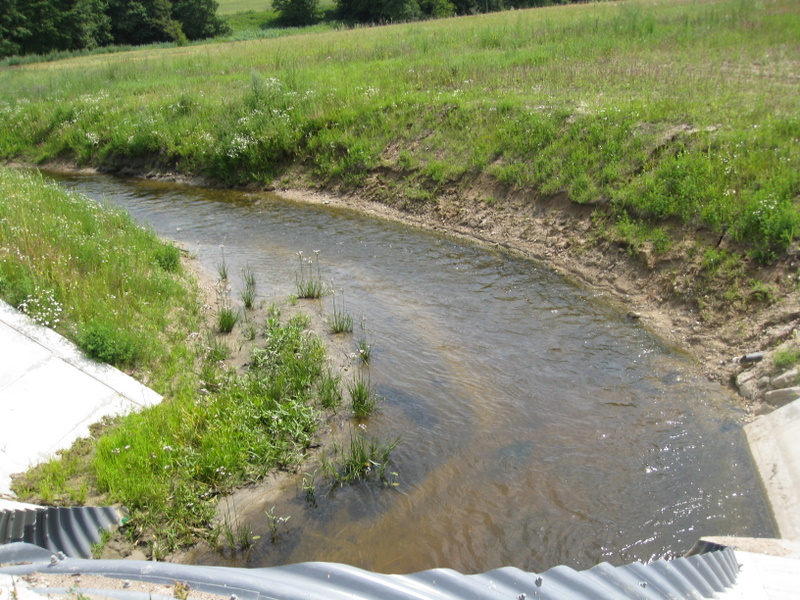
- The Peršėkė near Mergalaukis

Location
- Country: Lithuania
- Location: Alytus district municipality, Alytus County

Physical characteristics
- Mouth: Neman
  - coordinates: 54°31′45″N 23°53′32″E
- Length: 66 km (41 mi)
- Basin size: 542 km^{2} (209 sq mi)
- Discharge
  - average: 3.6 m^{3}/s (130 cu ft/s)

Basin features
- Progression: Neman→ Baltic Sea
- Tributaries
  - left: Metelytė, Atesė, Gluosinė, Varputys, Rudė, Kamaria, Vaičiukupis
  - right: Paežerėlė, Rudė II, Dūmė

The Peršėkė is a river of Alytus district municipality, Alytus County, southern Lithuania. It flows for 66 kilometres and has a basin area of 542 km².

It begins near Gervėnai village and crosses the Lake Obelija at upper course. There is a water reservoir on Peršėkė near Krokialaukis. The most important settlements along the Peršekė are Krokialaukis and Balbieriškis. Peršėkė joins the river Neman from its left side.
