= Butrimonys =

- Town
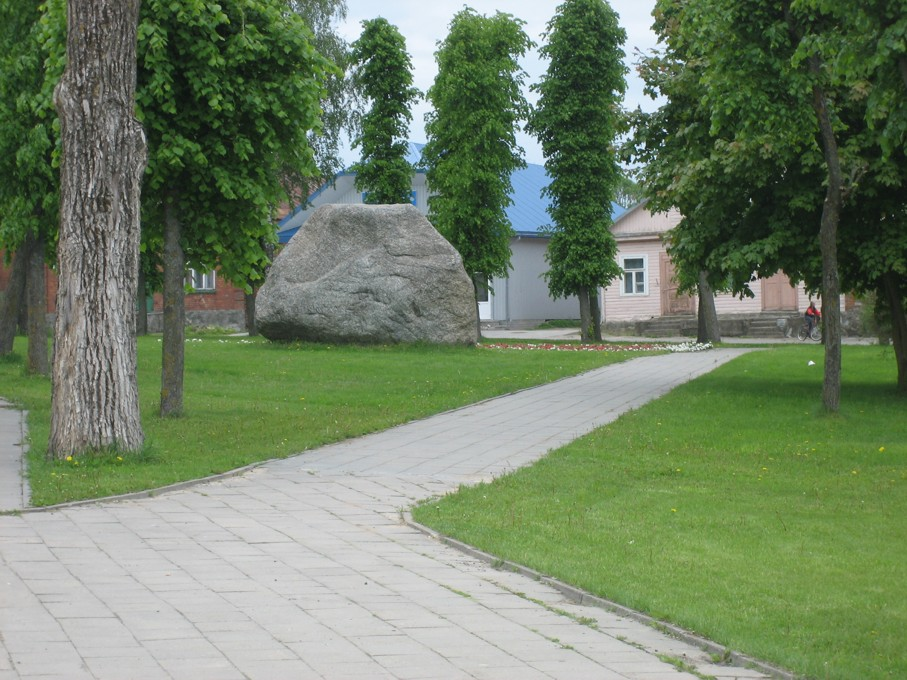
- Central square in Butrimonys

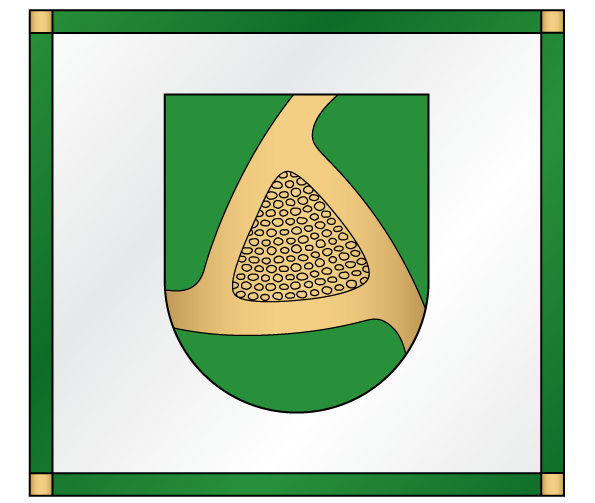
- Flag Coat of arms

- Location in Lithuania
- Coordinates: 54°30′10″N 24°15′10″E
- Country: Lithuania
- County: Alytus County
- Municipality: Alytus District Municipality
- Eldership: Butrimonys eldership
- Capital of: Butrimonys eldership

Population (2011)
  - Total: 941
- Time zone: UTC+2 (EET)
  - Summer (DST): UTC+3 (EEST)

Butrimonys (Yiddish: בוטרימאַנץ) is a small town in Alytus County in southern Lithuania. In 2011 it had a population of 941.

== Butrimonys massacre ==
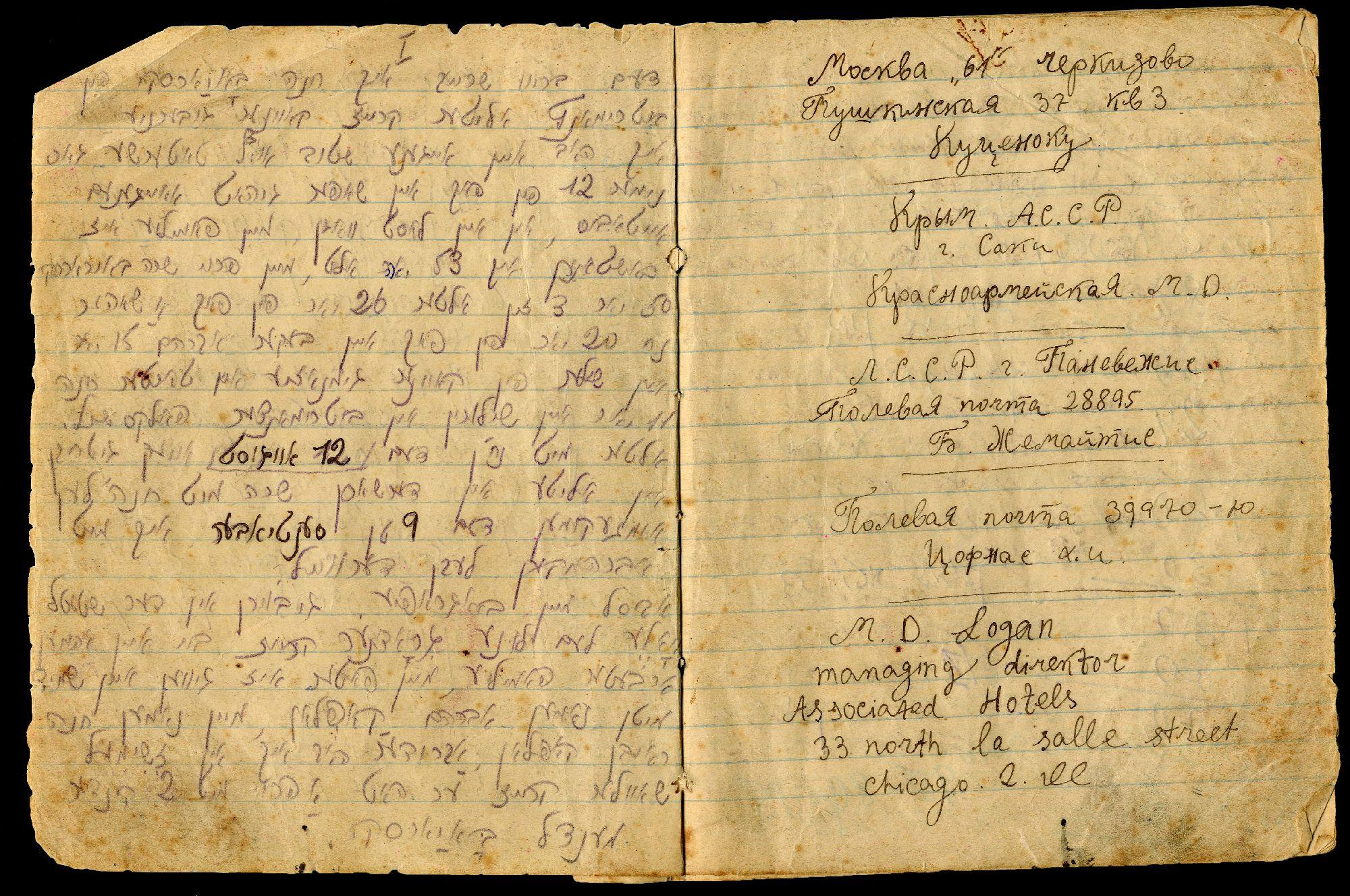
Farewell letter written in 1941 by Khone Boyarski.

On 9 September 1941, shortly after the Nazi invasion of the Soviet Union, the Jews of Butrimonys were massacred by Einsatzgruppen and Lithuanian collaborators. Rounded up and marched along a road, they were lined up beside a mass grave and machine-gunned. According to the Jäger Report, 740 Jews were murdered in one day: 67 men, 370 women, and 303 children.

What distinguished Butrimonys from hundreds of similar crimes in the Baltic region was the survival of a detailed record left by a local Jew Khone Boyarski. Hiding with his son, Boyarski described the events in a farewell letter to his relatives abroad. Boyarski was later killed by the Nazis; the letter was discovered by accident by a graduate student in the archives of Yad Vashem.

See also Rivka Lozansky-Bogomolnaya's memoir 'If I Forget Thee..the destruction of the shtetl Butrimantaz".

She also escaped from the massacre by pretending to be dead.

In addition this massacre features in a number of documentaries including episode 5 of The Nazis: A Warning from History

and a BBC series.

https://portal.ehri-project.eu/units/us-005578-irn514039

== Notable people ==
- Bernard Berenson (1865–1959), a famous and still influential American art historian
- Senda Berenson (1868–1954), known as the Mother of Women's Basketball. Berenson introduced basketball to women in 1892 at Smith College in Northampton, Massachusetts, United States, a year after being first invented by James Naismith. She also authored the first Basketball Guide for Women (1901–07).
- Meir Simcha of Dvinsk (1843–1926), rabbi, commentator on Bible and Talmud
