= Nemunaitis =

- Town
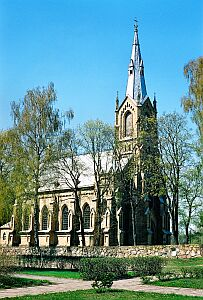

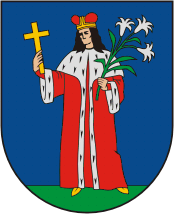
- Coat of arms

- Location in Lithuania
- Coordinates: 54°18′0″N 24°1′40″E
- Country: Lithuania
- Ethnographic region: Dzūkija
- County: Alytus County

Population (2011)
  - Total: 153
- Time zone: UTC+2 (EET)
  - Summer (DST): UTC+3 (EEST)

Nemunaitis is a small town in Alytus County in southern Lithuania. In 2011 it had a population of 153.

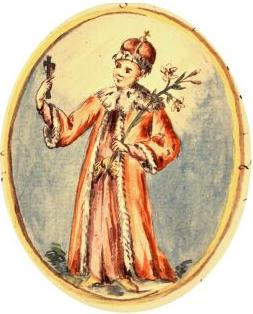
Nemunaitis coat of arms (1792)
