= Geniai (Varėna) =

Coordinates: 54°08′49″N 24°00′40″E

- Village
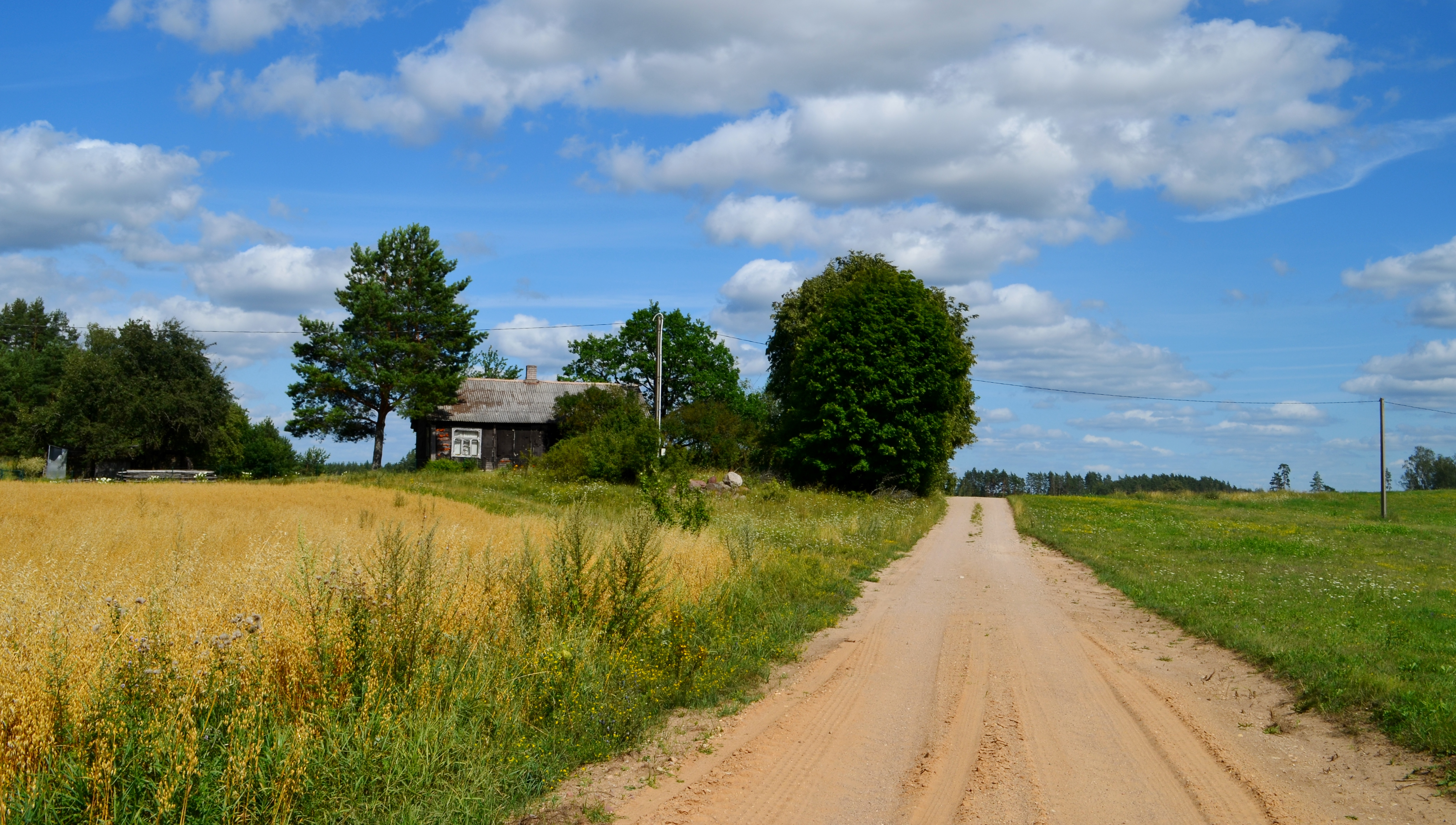
- Interactive map of Geniai
- Country: Lithuania
- County: Alytus County
- Municipality: Varėna

Population (2001)
  - Total: 43
- Time zone: UTC+2 (EET)
  - Summer (DST): UTC+3 (EEST)

Geniai is a village in Varėna district municipality, in Alytus County, in southeastern Lithuania. According to the 2001 census, the village has a population of 43 people.
