= Neringa Dangvydė =

Lithuanian writer (1975–2020)

- Born: 6 April 1975; Vilnius, Lithuanian SSR
- Died: 21 March 2020 (aged 44); Vilnius, Lithuania
- Other names: Neringa Macatė; Neringa Mikalauskienė
- Occupations: Writer, translator, poet
- Notable work: Amber Heart

Neringa Dangvydė was the pen name of Neringa Macatė (previously Mikalauskienė) (6 April 1975 – 21 March 2020), a Lithuanian writer, poet, book illustrator, and literary critic. She is best known as the author of two children's books. Her debut book, Amber Heart, was published in 2013 and caused public controversy because it depicted same-sex relationships in a positive light. Dangvydė sued Lithuania for imposing limits on the distribution of the book at the European Convention on Human Rights. In January 2023, the case was ruled in her favor.

== Biography ==
Neringa Dangvydė was born in Vilnius, but spent her childhood and youth in Alytus, where she graduated from the 9th secondary school and an art school. She went to study philosophy at Vilnius University but quickly switched to literary studies. She was a member of the Lithuanian Writers' Union (since 2017) and of IBBY Lithuania (International Bilingual Literature and Young People's Literature Association). She died of cancer on 21 March 2020.

Dangvydė published two books for children: the collection of fairy tales Amber Heart (Gintarinė širdis, 2013) and the novel Child with a Star on the Forehead (Vaikas su žvaigžde kaktoje, 2016). The novel explored loneliness and ridicule faced by children from "incomplete" families. While the first book caused public controversy, the second book was awarded the Vytautas Tamulaitis Award, which was established in 1998 by the Šakiai District Municipality. She also wrote poetry; the collection Kiaukuto nešėja was published posthumously in 2021. Monika Bertašiūtė-Čiužienė writing for 15min.lt selected the collection as one of the top 11 Lithuanian poetry books of 2021. The collection explores lesbian romance. Just before her death, she finished a novella for young adults Ripper (Plėšytojas), which has not been published.

Dangvydė wrote literary criticism and published in journals active in the cultural field: Literatūra ir menas, Gimtasis žodis, Nemunas, Šiaurės Atėnai, Metai, The Vilnius Review, and Ribinaitis. She also illustrated books, including her own children's books and Gugis – girių kaukas ir žmonių draugas by Justinas Žilinskas in 2006.

Dangvydė was an accomplished translator. She translated the following authors from English and French: Makgregorai: Sibilė (The MacGregors: The Perfect Neighbor) by Nora Roberts (2015), L'enfer aussi a son orchestre : la musique dans les camps (Ir pragaras turi savo orkestrą: muzika koncentracijos stovyklose) by Hélios Azoulay and Pierre-Emmanuel Dauzat (2016), Small Country (Maža šalis) by Gaël Faye (2017), La nuit de feu (Ugnies naktis) by Éric-Emmanuel Schmitt (2018), Oro, Las Cartas De Mi Padre (Auksas: mano tėvo laiškai) by Hélène Cixous (2018).

== Controversy over Amber Heart ==
The debut book Amber Heart (in Lithuanian: Gintarinė širdis) stirred public controversy and scandal: the book was accused of promoting "propaganda of homosexuality". The book was an attempt to rewrite classic children's literature, drawing inspiration from the Brothers Grimm or Hans Christian Andersen, to reflect modern social issues and include characters from marginalized social groups: different racial groups, people with disabilities, divorced families. Two of the six fairy tales were about same-sex relationships. The stories addressed issues such as exclusion, ghosting, and harassment. The book was republished in Lithuanian with new illustrations by Dangvydė in late 2014 by several human rights organizations in Lithuania. The book was translated to English and published in 2020 by the Lithuanian Center for Human Rights.

Several associations representing families complained about the depiction of homosexual relations in Amber Heart. The Lithuanian Office of the Inspectorate of Journalistic Ethics ruled that the two stories with LGBT elements violated the Law on the Protection of Minors against the Detrimental Effects of Public Information. This law prohibits "expressing contempt for family values" or "promoting a view of marriage and family creation different from that enshrined in the Constitution or the Civil Code". The book publisher, the Press of the Lithuanian University of Educational Sciences, initially suspended the distribution of the book but later allowed it to be sold with a warning that it is not intended for children under 14 years of age. Lithuanian courts sided with the government, and Dangvydė submitted a petition to the European Court of Human Rights arguing that Lithuania violated the European Convention on Human Rights, which protects freedom of expression and prohibits discrimination. The case was relinquished to the Grand Chamber of the European Court of Human Rights, which ruled in her favor on 23 january 2023.

== Works ==
- Dangvydė, Neringa (2013). Gintarinė širdis: pasakos (in Lithuanian). Vilnius: Edukologija. ISBN 9786099569000.
- Dangvydė, Neringa (2016). Vaikas su žvaigžde kaktoje: apysaka (in Lithuanian). Vilnius: Labdaros ir paramos fondas "Švieskime vaikus". ISBN 978-609-8161-12-0.
- Dangvydė, Neringa (2021). Kiaukuto nešėja (in Lithuanian). Utena: Kamonada. ISBN 9786098011838.
