= Krokialaukis =

- Town
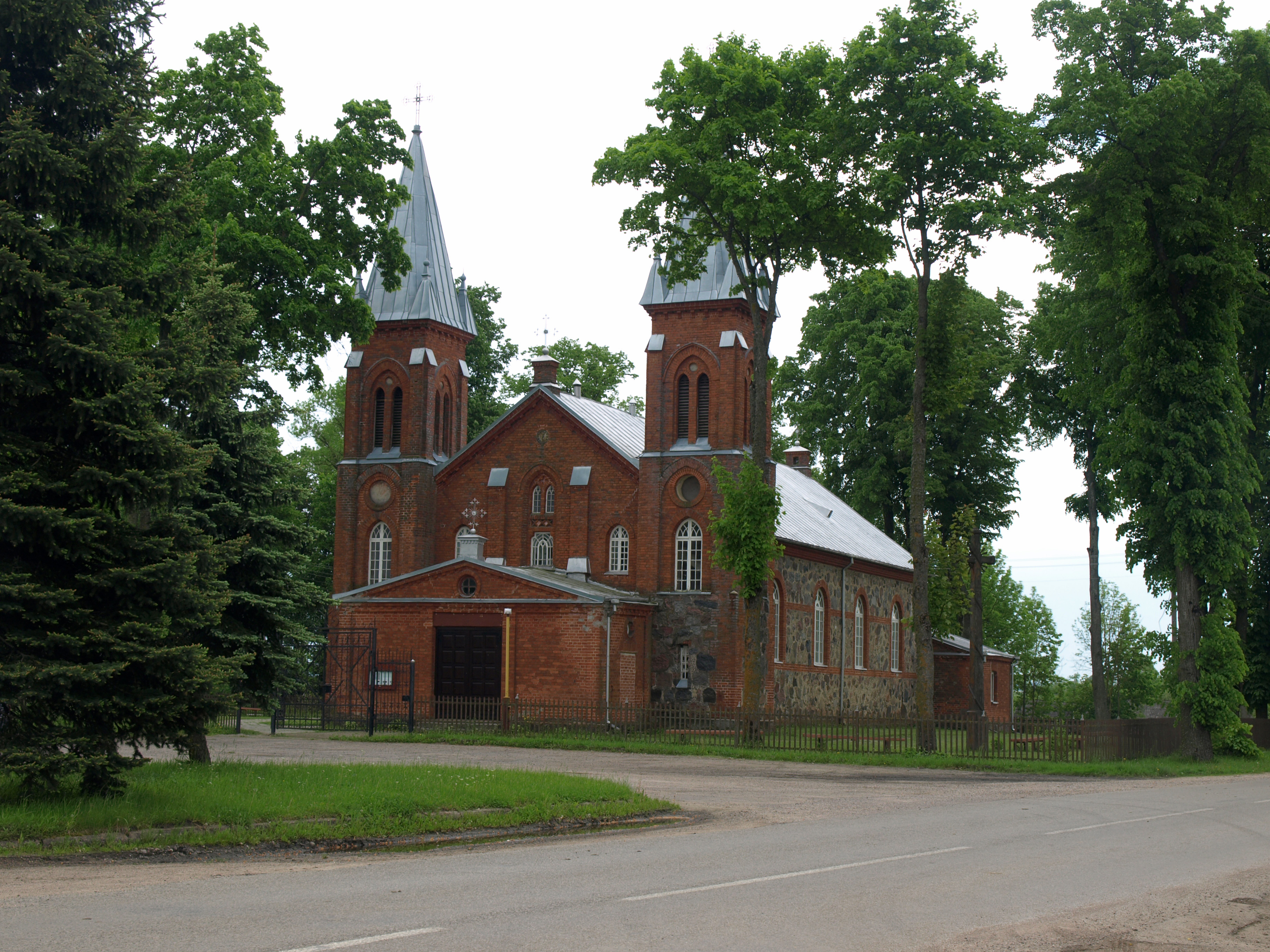
- Church of Transfiguration

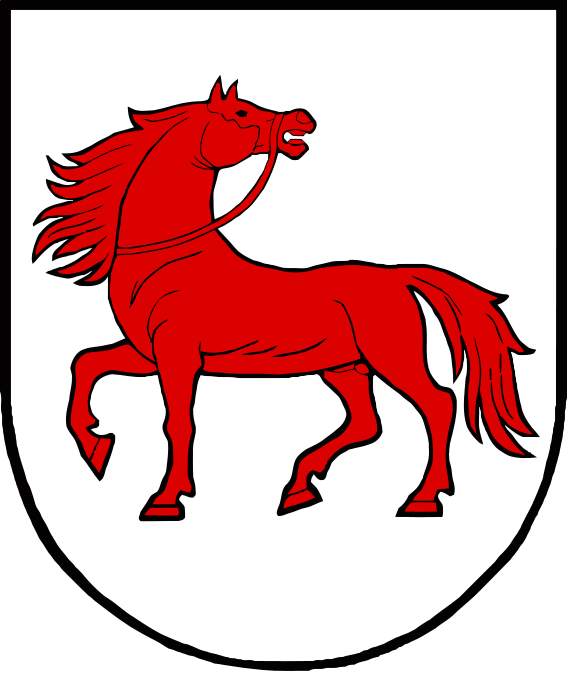
- Coat of arms

- Location in Lithuania
- Coordinates: 54°26′10″N 23°45′50″E
- Country: Lithuania
- Ethnographic region: Dzūkija
- County: Alytus County

Population (2011)
  - Total: 218
- Time zone: UTC+2 (EET)
  - Summer (DST): UTC+3 (EEST)

Krokialaukis is a small town in Alytus County in southern Lithuania. It is located about 10 km northeast of Simnas. In 2011 it had a population of 218. It serves as the administrative centre of its eldership.

== Geography ==
The town lies along the Peršėkė, a tributary of the Neman River, with the Krokialaukis Reservoir situated on its western edge.
