= Kaniava Eldership =

Kaniava Eldership Kaniavos seniūnija
- Eldership
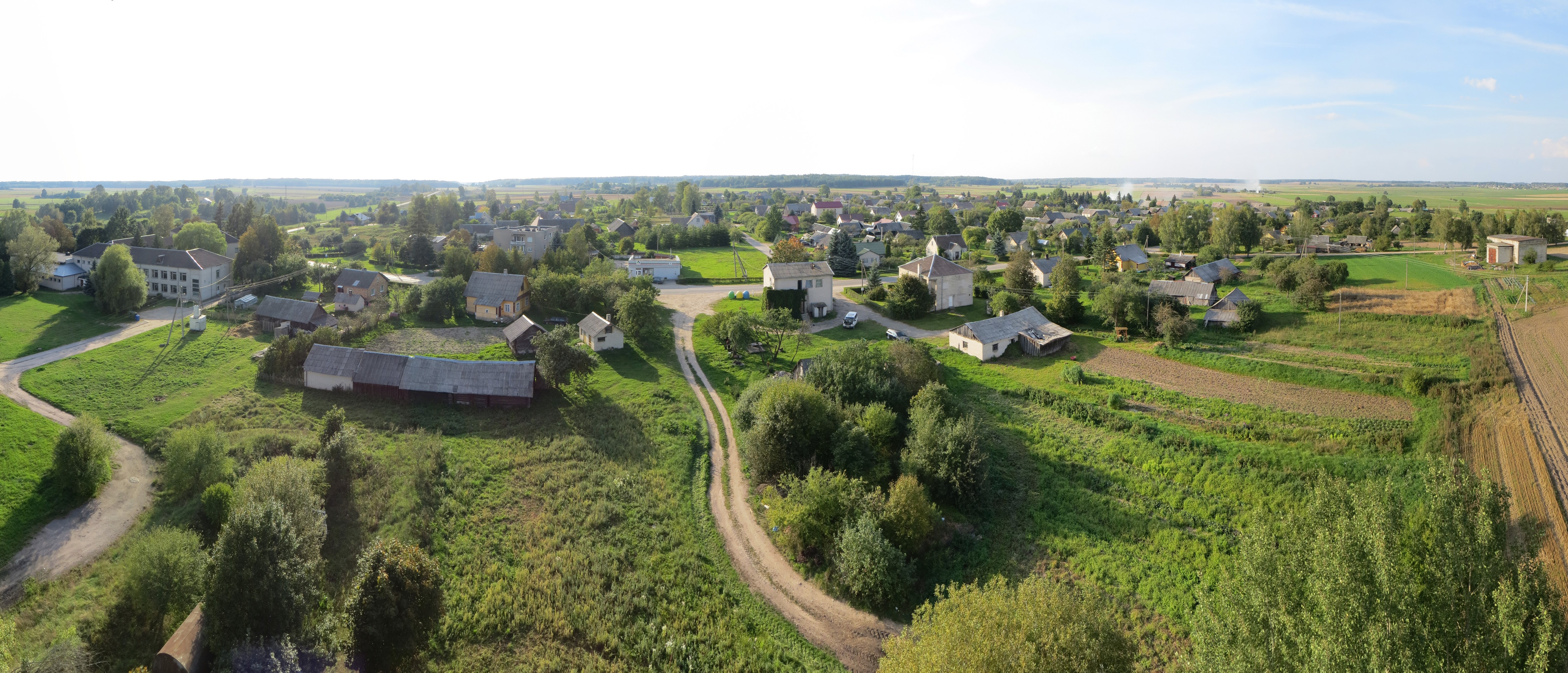
- Panočiai

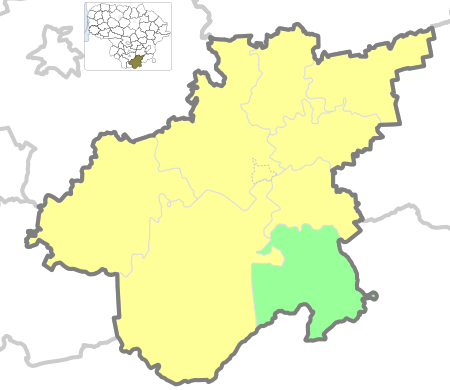
- Location of Kaniava Eldership
- Coordinates: 54.067°N 24.687°E
- Country: Lithuania
- Ethnographic region: Dzūkija
- County: Alytus County
- Municipality: Varėna District Municipality
- Administrative centre: Panočiai

Area
  - Total: 263 km^{2} (102 sq mi)

Population (2021)
  - Total: 1,009
  - Density: 3.84/km^{2} (9.94/sq mi)
- Time zone: UTC+2 (EET)
  - Summer (DST): UTC+3 (EEST)

Kaniava Eldership (Lithuanian: Kaniavos seniūnija) is a Lithuanian eldership, located in the southern part of Varėna District Municipality. Part of the ethnographic Dainava region and is in proximity to the Dzūkija National Park. The eldership encompasses a number of villages, Kaniava, Rudnia, and Ūta.
