= Veisiejai Manor =

Residential manor in Lithuania

Coordinates: 54°6′0″N 23°41′34″E

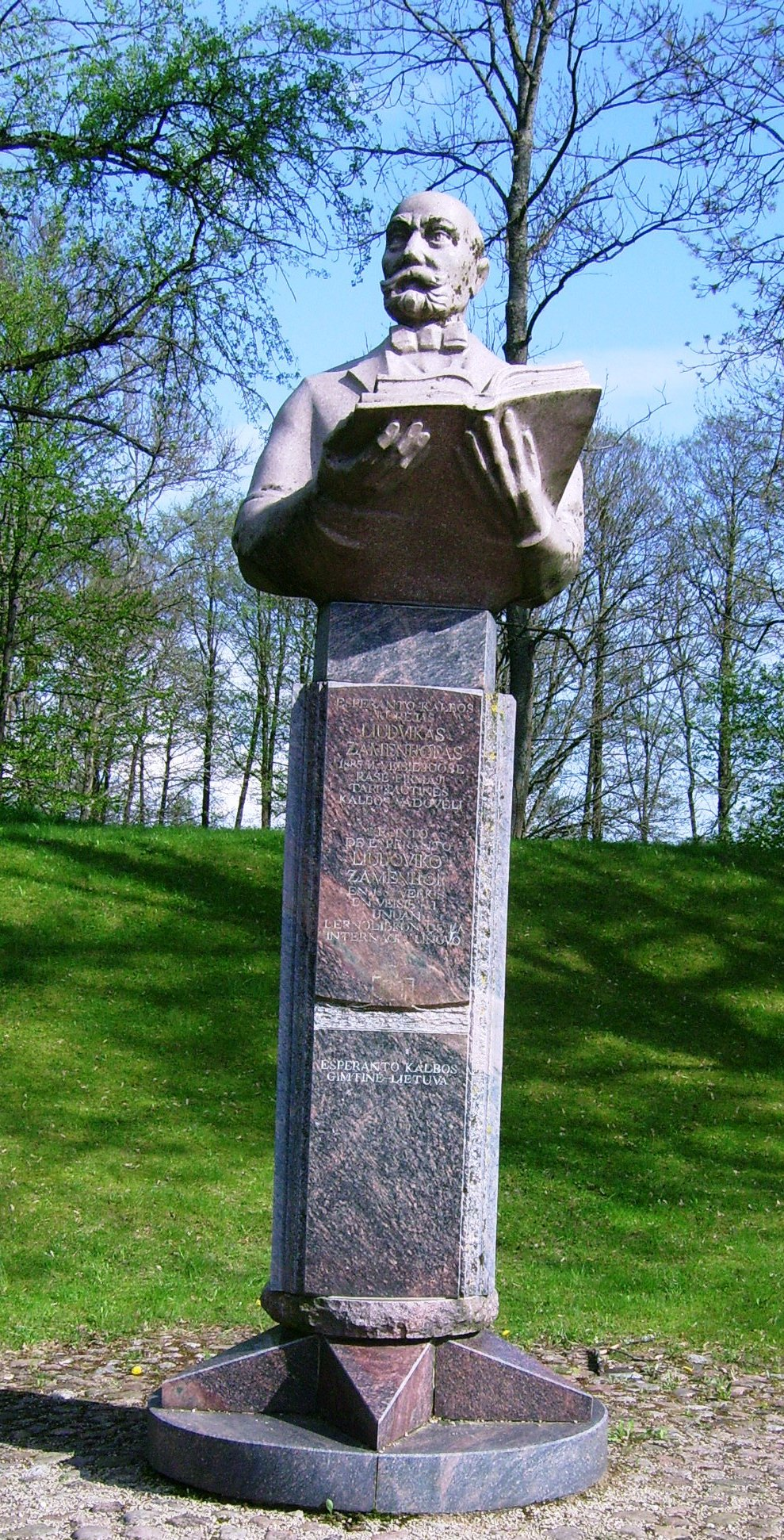
Monument for L. Zamenhof, built in the manor park, in 1998.

Veisiejai Manor was a residential manor in Veisiejai, Lazdijai district. The manor has one of the oldest parks in Lithuania, however only one pavilion remained until nowadays, which was reconstructed.
