= Rudamina (Lazdijai) =

- Town
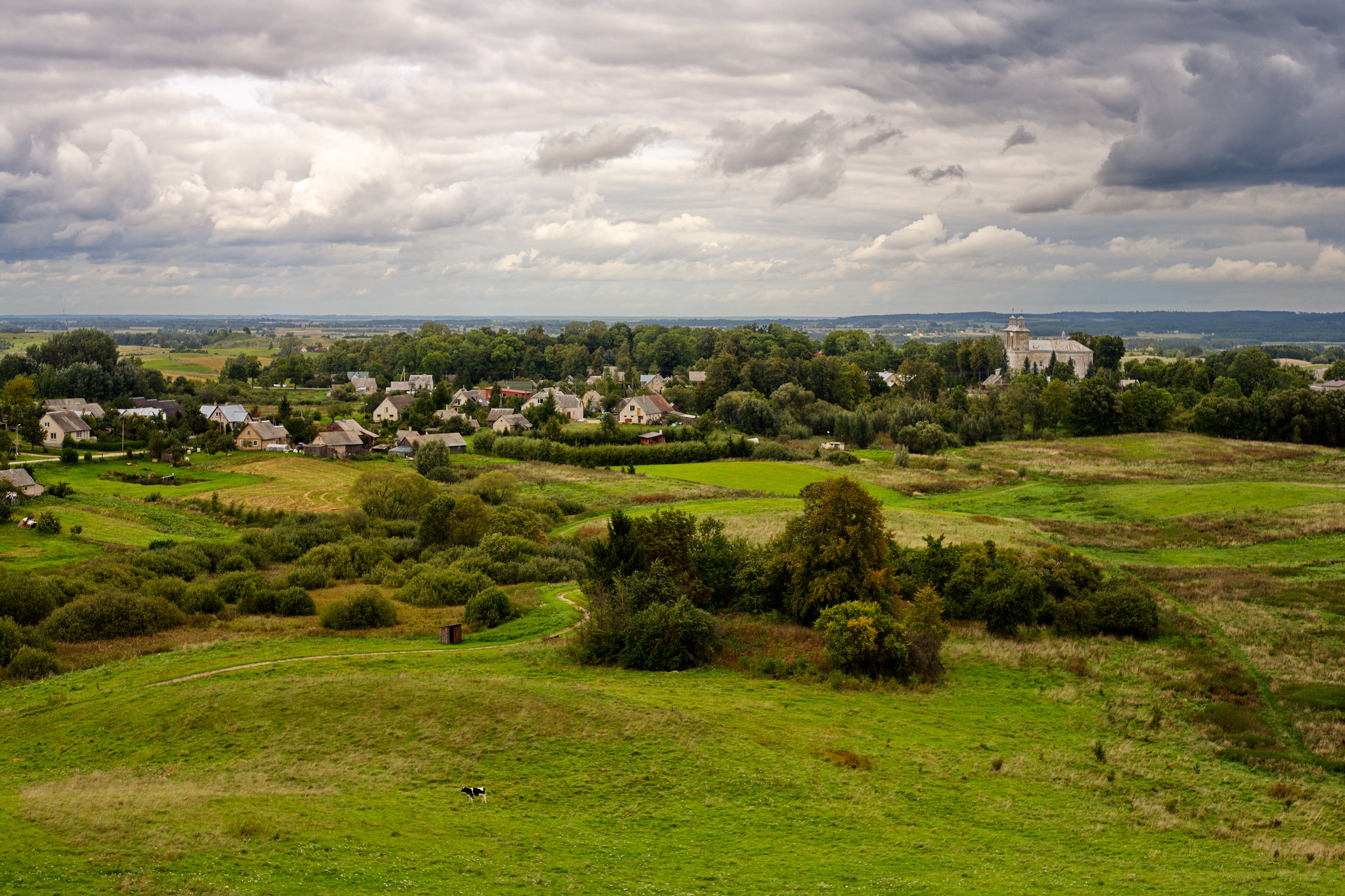
- Rudamina panorama

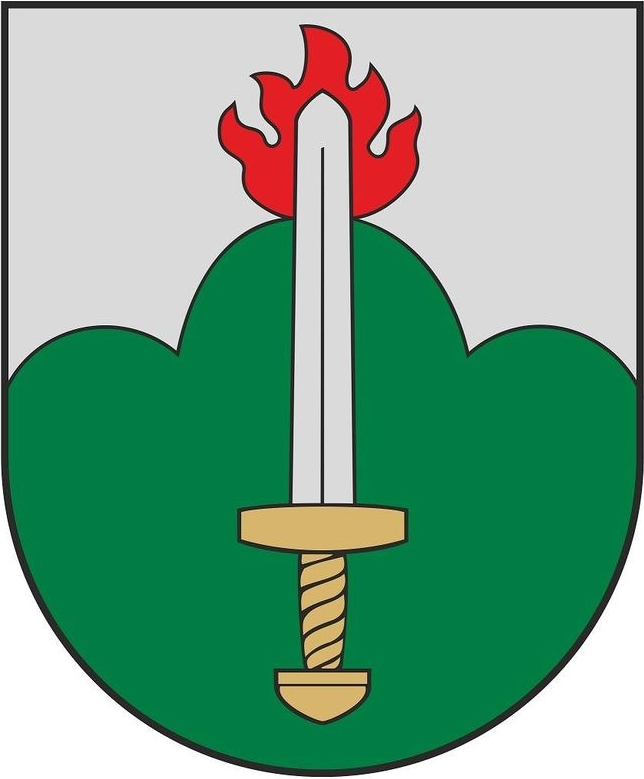
- Coat of arms

- Location in Lithuania
- Coordinates: 54°17′20″N 23°27′0″E
- Country: Lithuania
- Municipality: Lazdijai district municipality
- Eldership: Lazdijai eldership

Population (2021)
  - Total: 197
- Time zone: UTC+2 (EET)
  - Summer (DST): UTC+3 (EEST)

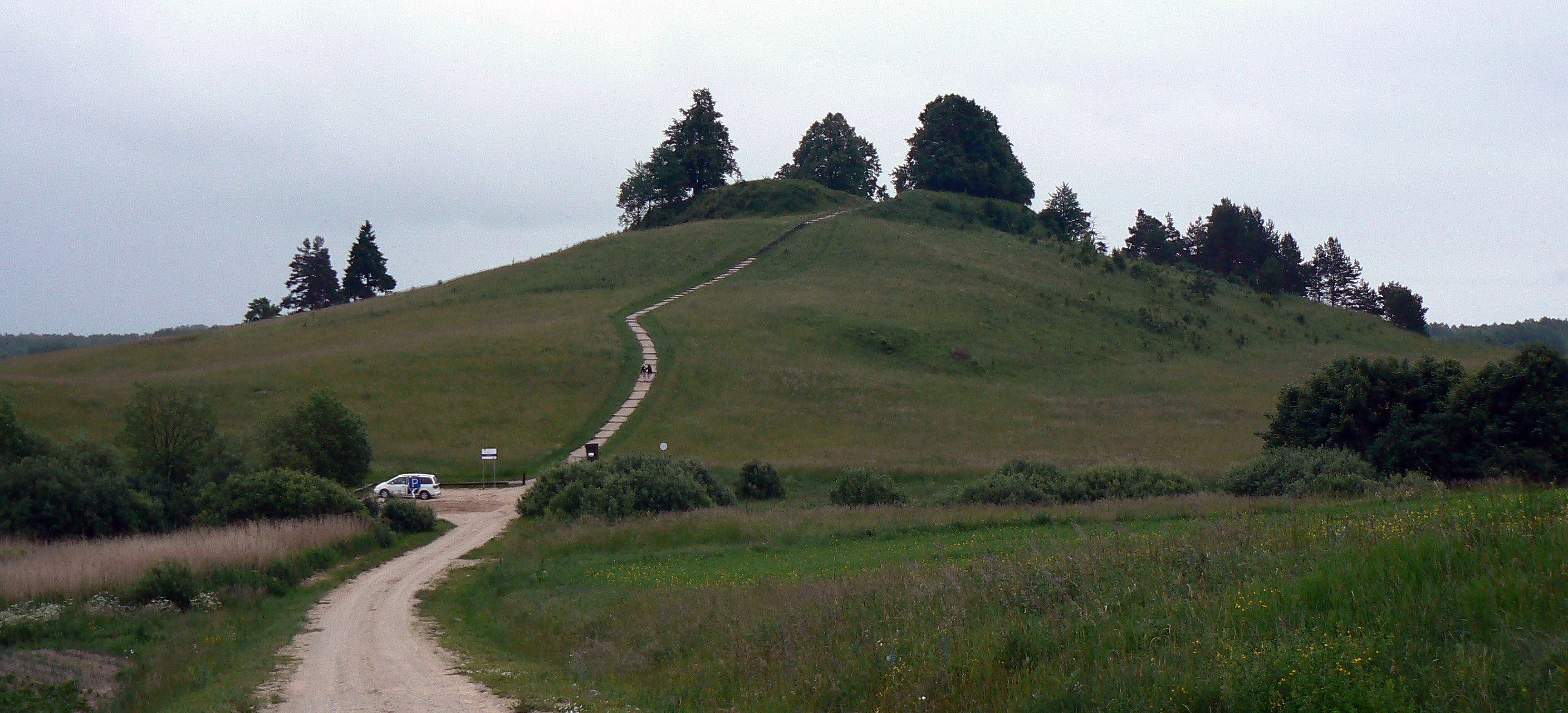
Rudamina mound

Rudamina is a small town in Alytus County in southern Lithuania. As of 2011 it had a population of 256. Rudamina hill fort, one of the most prominent hill forts of ancient Yotvingians, is located about 1 km southwest of the town. Nearby tumuli were dated to 3rd–4th century AD. The town traces its history to 1576 when Massalski family established an estate and began cutting down the forest. In 1592, the Massalkis built a Catholic church; the present-day church was built in the 1770s. The town received Magdeburg rights in the early 17th century. However, Rudamina never grew larger as it was overshadowed by nearby Lazdijai and Šeštokai with its train station. Its population was 269 in 1800, 256 in 1923, 329 in 1959, 367 in 1979.
