= Bugieda =

Village in Alytus County, Lithuania

- Village
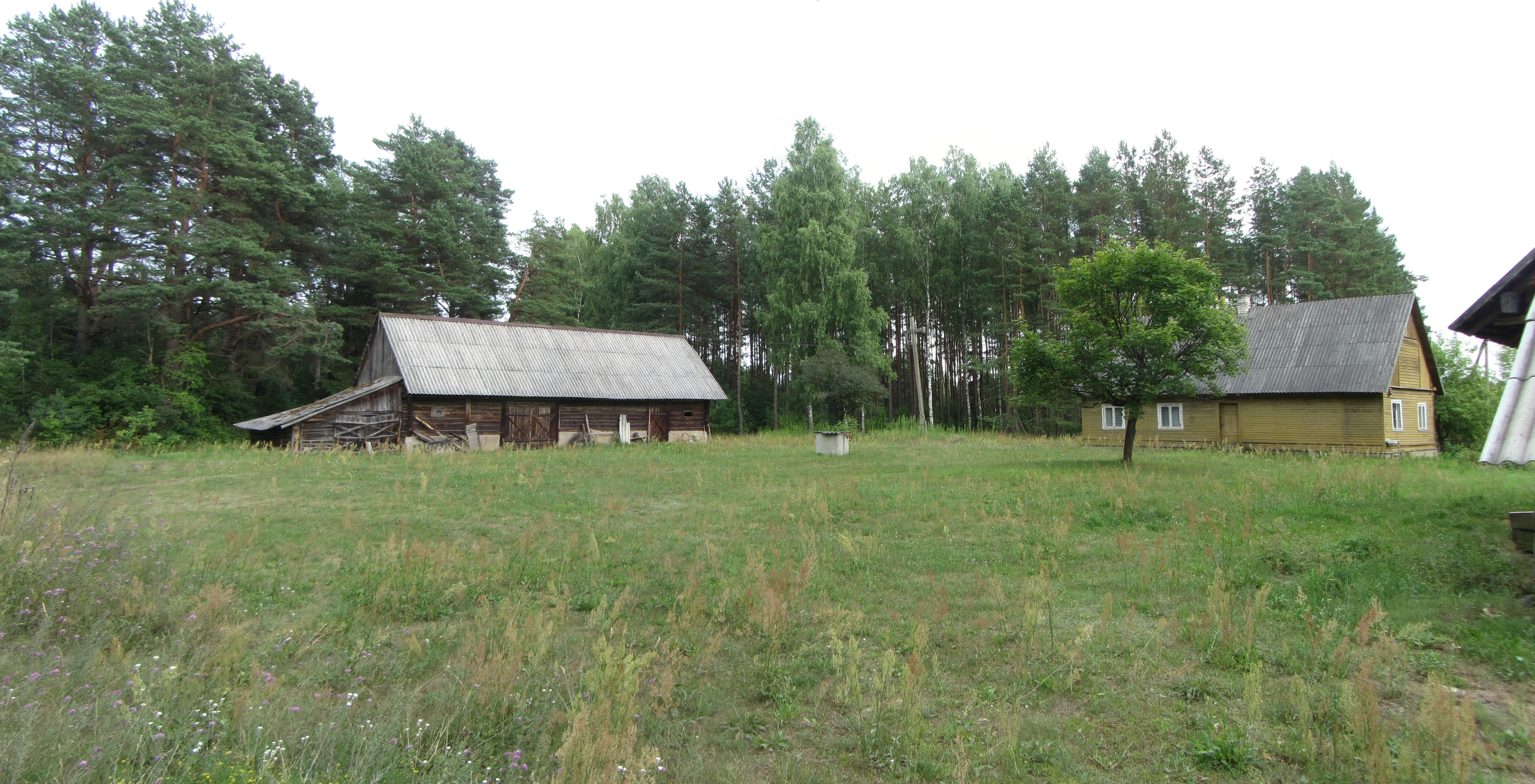

- Location within Lithuania
- Coordinates: 53°56′42″N 23°47′56″E
- Country: Lithuania
- County: Alytus County
- Municipality: Lazdijai District Municipality
- Eldership: Kapčiamiestis Eldership
- Time zone: UTC+2 (EET)
  - Summer (DST): UTC+3 (EEST)

Bugieda (Polish: Bugieda) is a village in Kapčiamiestis Eldership, Lazdijai District Municipality, Alytus County, in southern Lithuania.

On 27 February 1948, it was the site of a clash between the Polish resistance movement and the Soviet MVD (successor to the NKVD), won by the Soviets.
