= Rudamina =

Rudamina may refer to:

- Rudamina (Vilnius)
- Rudamina (Lazdijai)
