= Veisiejis =

Lake in Lazdijai District Municipality, Lithuania

Lake Veisiejis
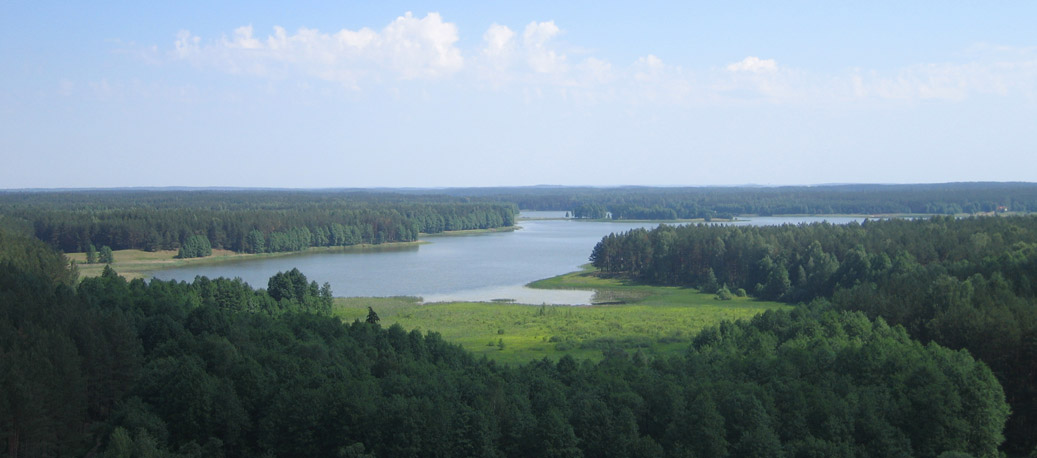

- Location within Lithuania
- Location: Lazdijai district, Lithuania
- Coordinates: 54.05°N 23.60°E
- Primary inflows: Zapsė
- Primary outflows: 4 rivulets
- Basin countries: Lithuania
- Max. length: 12.5 km (7.8 mi)
- Surface area: 7.652 km^{2} (2.954 sq mi)
- Average depth: 6.03 m (19.8 ft)
- Max. depth: 33.8 m (111 ft)
- Shore length^{1}: 41.13 km (25.56 mi)
- Islands: 13
- ^{1} Shore length is not a well-defined measure.

Veisiejis Lake is in the Lazdijai district of southern Lithuania, about 6 kilometres (3.7 mi) southwest of Veisiejai city. The lake is narrow, like a river, with sharp, high shores. Veisiejis Lake has 13 islands with a total area of 0.322 square kilometres (0.124 sq mi). The lake connects with Lake Niedus.

Around the lake are the villages of Paveisiejai, Navikai, Gerveliai, Sapiegiškiai, Paveisininkai, Burbai, Palačionys, Purviniai, Subačiai, and Kalviai.

The Veisiejis lake had a surface area of 4.44 square kilometres (1.71 sq mi) until 1956, but after the construction of the Kapčiamiestis hydroelectric power station, Veisiejis joined with Nadorius and Uosis lakes.

== Sources ==
- Jonas Zinkus; et al., eds. (1988). "Simno-Žvorūnė". Tarybų Lietuvos enciklopedija (in Lithuanian). Vol. 4. Vilnius, Lithuania: Vyriausioji enciklopedijų redakcija. p. 474.
