= Krosna =

- Town
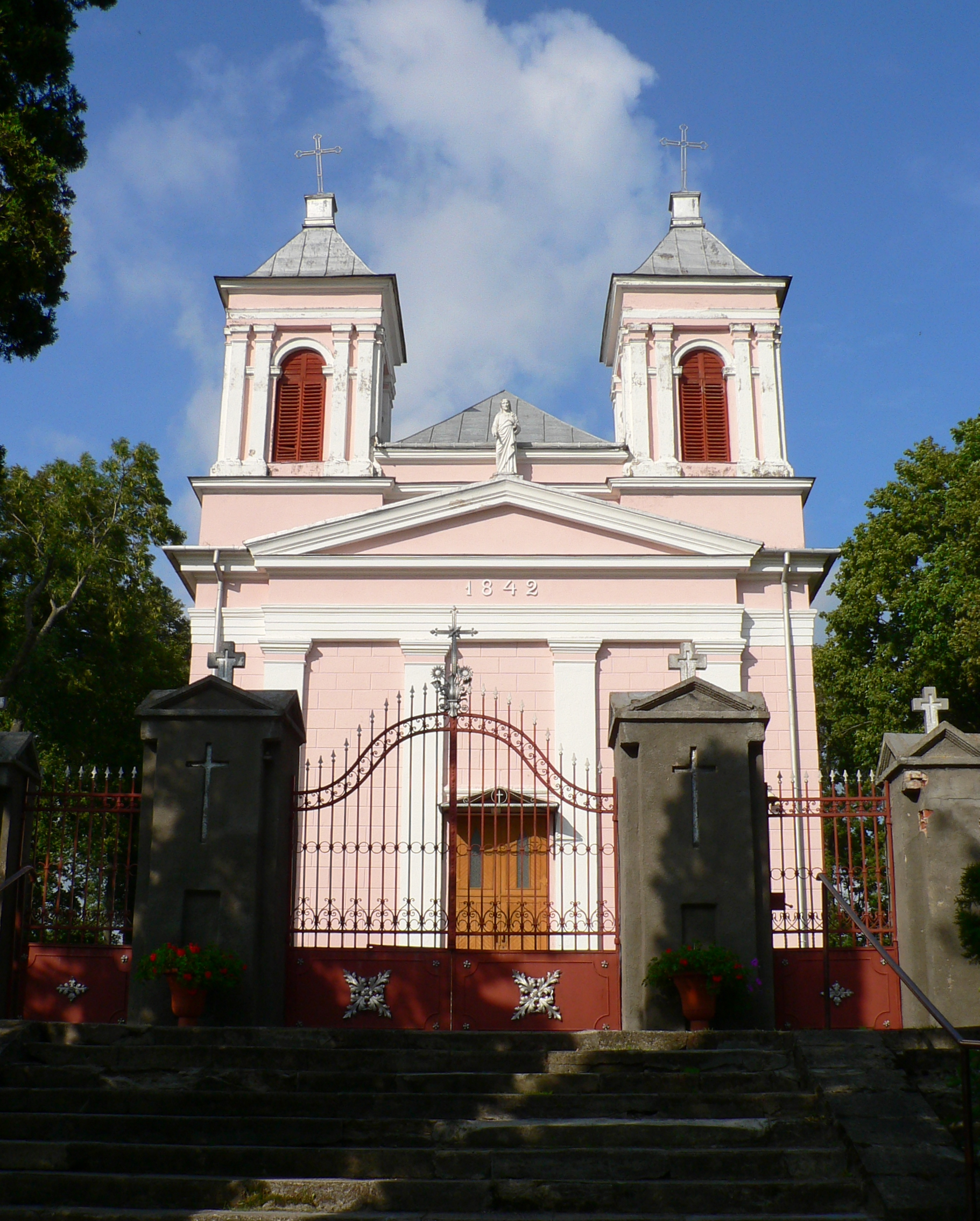
- St. Matthew the Evangelist church in Krosna

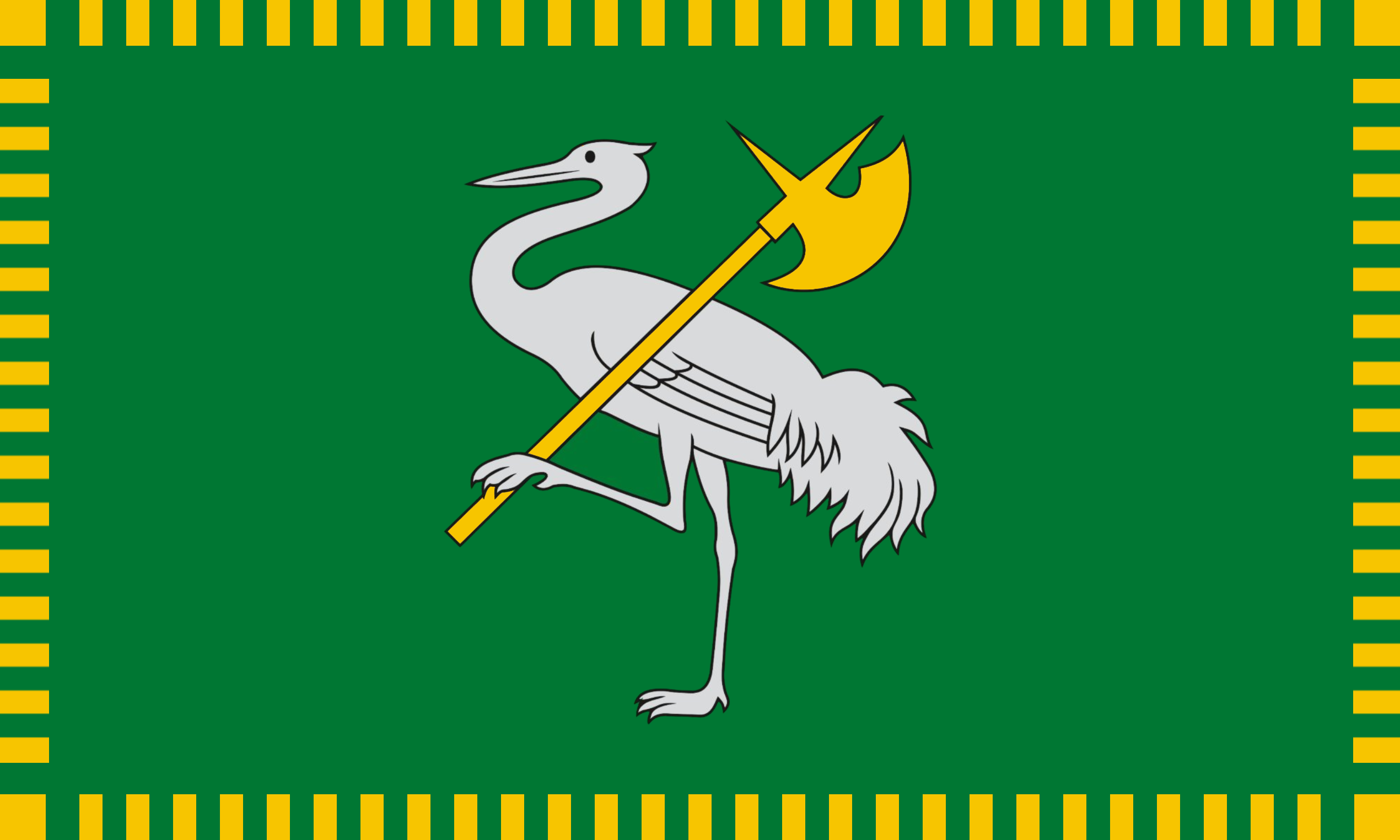
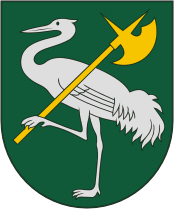
- Flag Coat of arms

- Location of Krosna
- Coordinates: 54°22′40″N 23°31′50″E
- Country: Lithuania
- Ethnographic region: Dzūkija
- County: Alytus County
- Municipality: Lazdijai district municipality
- Eldership: Krosna eldership
- Capital of: Krosna eldership
- First mentioned: 1602

Population (2021)
  - Total: 244
- Time zone: UTC+2 (EET)
  - Summer (DST): UTC+3 (EEST)

Krosna is a town in Lazdijai district municipality in eastern Lithuania, located 18 km away from Lazdijai. The etymology of the town's name may come from water, specifically from Krosna river.
