= Šventežeris =

- Town
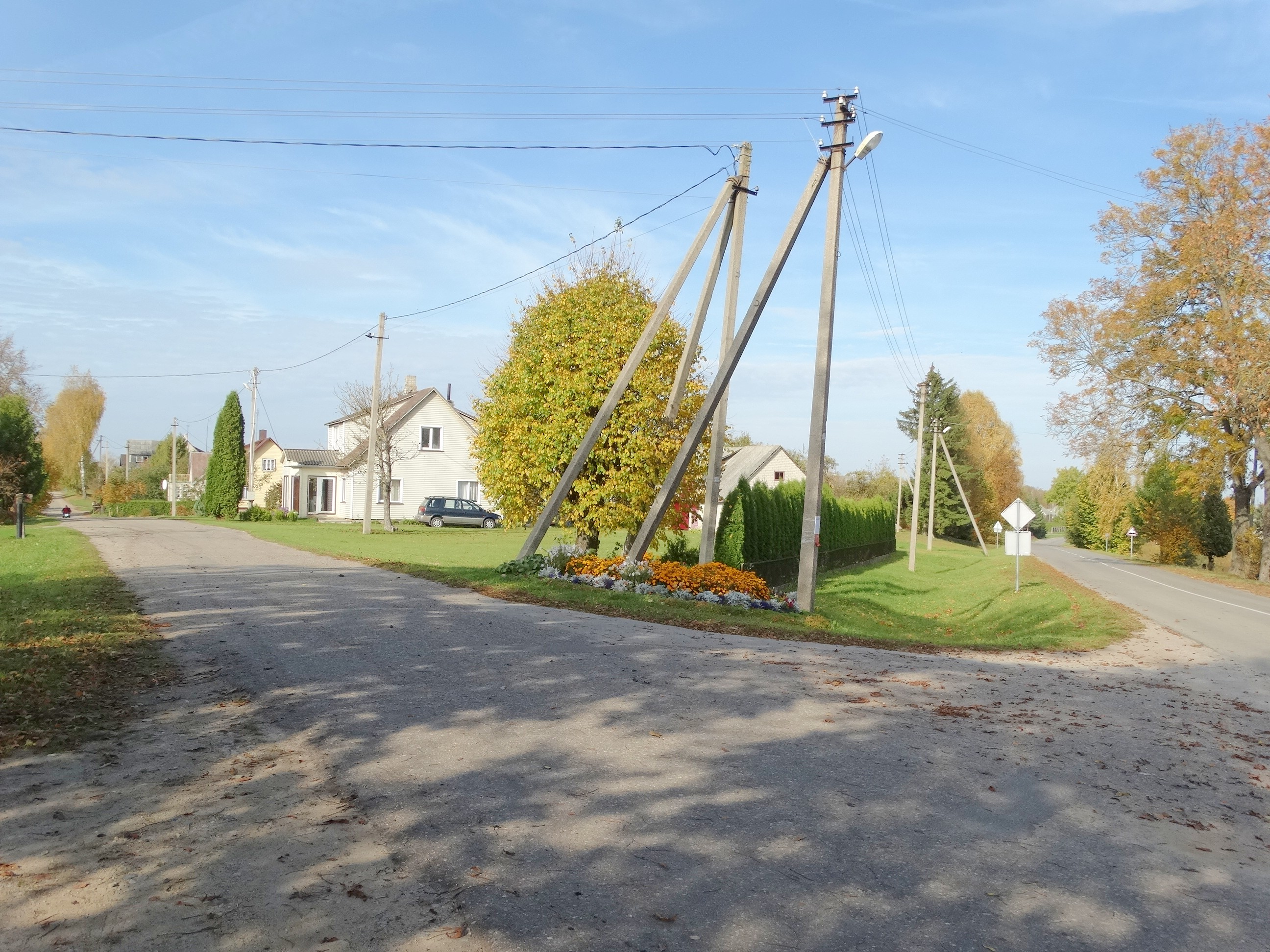

- Location in Lithuania
- Coordinates: 54°14′20″N 23°38′30″E
- Country: Lithuania
- County: Alytus County
- Municipality: Lazdijai district municipality
- Eldership: Šventežeris eldership
- Capital of: Šventežeris eldership

Population (2021)
  - Total: 262
- Time zone: UTC+2 (EET)
  - Summer (DST): UTC+3 (EEST)

Šventežeris (literally: sacred lake) is a small town in Alytus County in southern Lithuania. As of 2011, it had a population of 295. It is situated some 8 kilometres (5.0 mi) east of Lazdijai on the banks of Lake Šventežeris.

The town traces its history to Jerzy Radziwiłł, castellan of Trakai, who distributed land to his serfs. His heirs built a Calvinist church in 1598 and turned the town into a parish seat. Samuel Bogusław Chyliński (1631–1668), son of a Protestant priest and first translator of the Bible into the Lithuanian language whose translation was put to print, was born in the town. According to inventory of 1650, Šventežeris had a market square and 78 resident families.

However, it suffered during the Second Northern War (1655–1661) and the population dropped to 47 families in 1663. Šventežeris never recovered and became a village. In 1663, the Protestant church was taken over by the Catholics. In 1746, a new church was built, but it burned down in 1863. The new church, built in 1882, survives to this day. It has a Neoclassical exterior and Baroque altars. The Radziwiłł family lost possession of the town in 1783. The population grew somewhat in the 1920s when the former estate was divided and sold out to the peasants. The town had 325 residents in 1886, 417 in 1923, 547 in 1959, and 478 in 1978.
