= Būdvietis Eldership =

Eldership of Lithuania

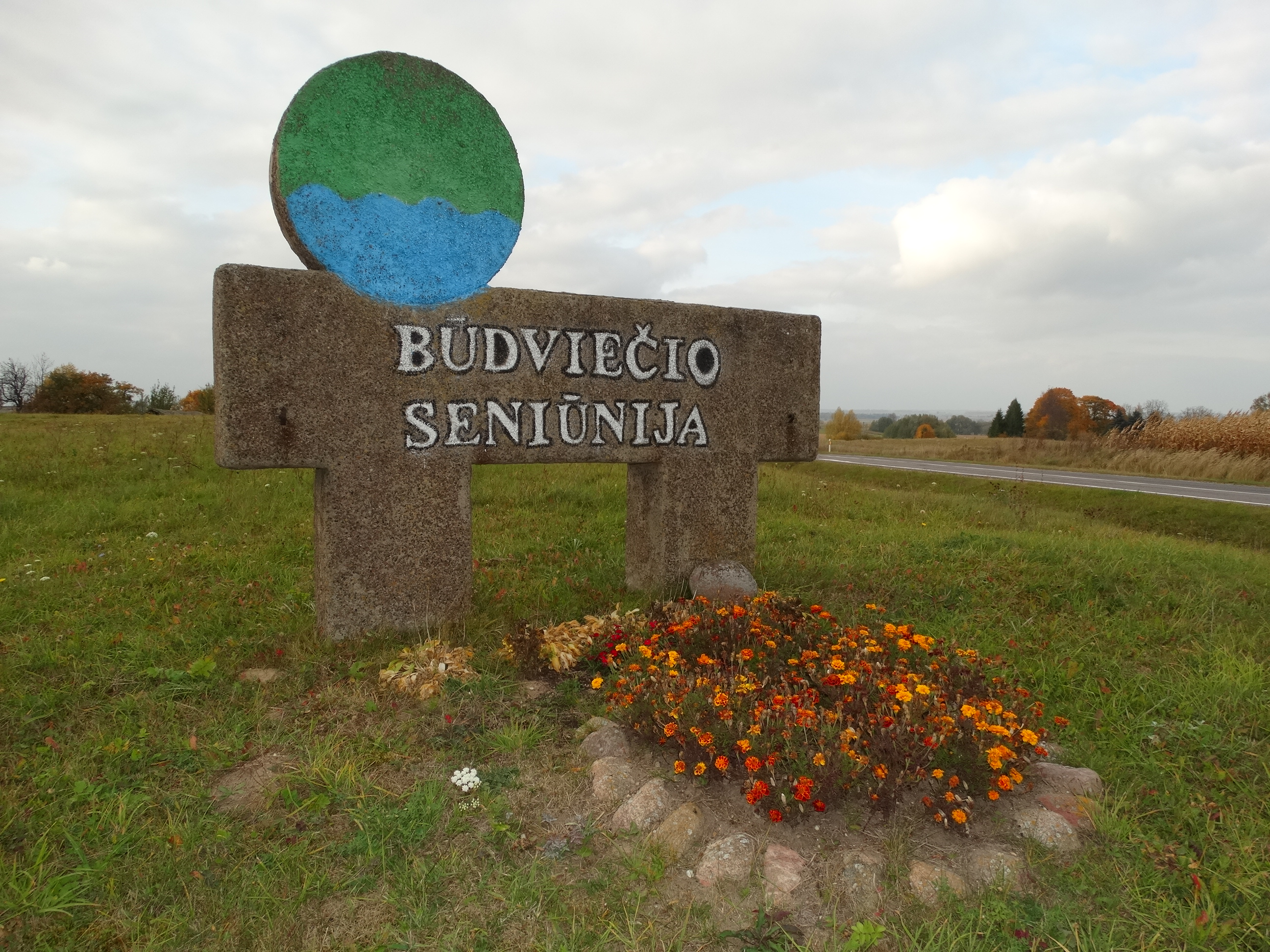
Eldership, Būdvietis, Lazdijai district, Lithuania

The Būdvietis Eldership (Lithuanian: Būdviečio seniūnija) is an eldership of Lithuania, located in the Lazdijai District Municipality. In 2021 its population was 800.
