= Seirijai Eldership =

Eldership of Lithuania

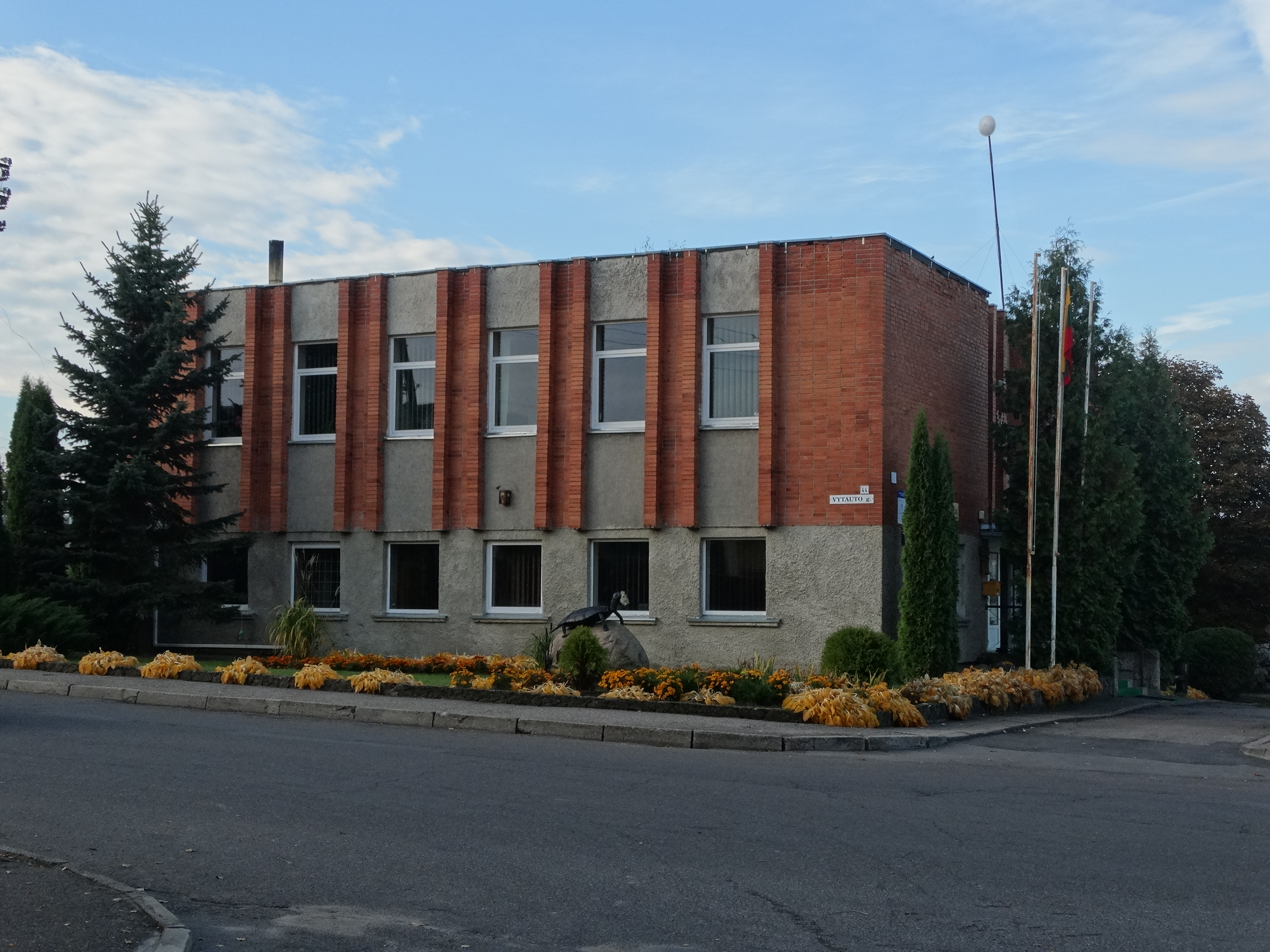

The Seirijai Eldership (Lithuanian: Seirijų seniūnija) is an eldership of Lithuania, located in the Lazdijai District Municipality. In 2021 its population was 2024.
