= Šeštokai Eldership =

Eldership of Lithuania

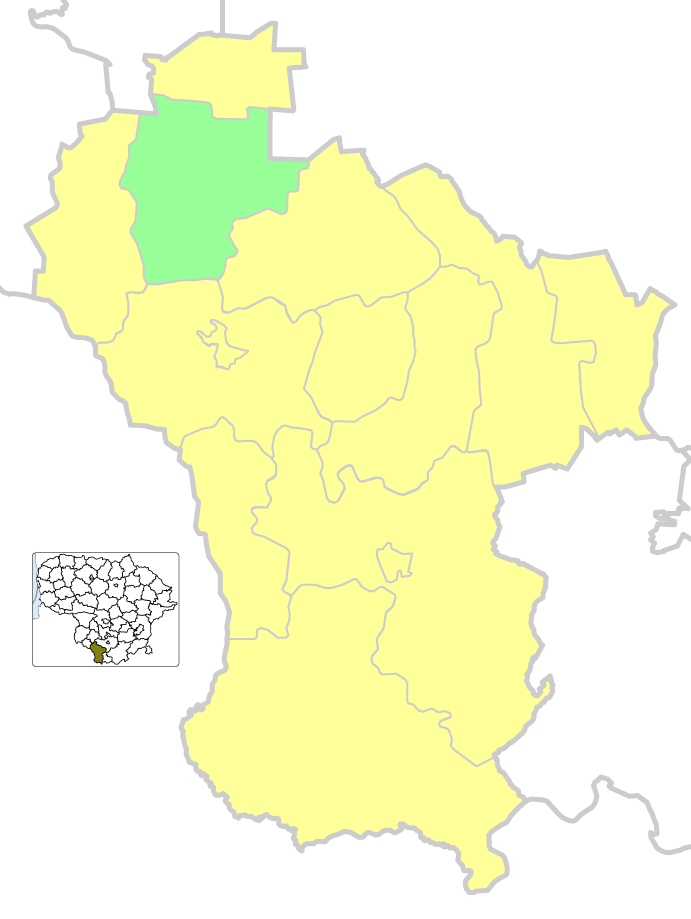
Location of Šeštokai Eldership in Lazdijai District Municipality

The Šeštokai Eldership (Lithuanian: Šeštokų seniūnija) is an eldership of Lithuania, located in the Lazdijai District Municipality. In 2021 its population was 1252.
