= Lazdijai Eldership =

Eldership of Lithuania

The Lazdijai Eldership (Lithuanian: Lazdijų seniūnija) is an eldership of Lithuania, located in the Lazdijai District Municipality. In 2021 its population was 2413.
