= Veisiejai Eldership =

Eldership of Lithuania

The Veisiejai Eldership (Lithuanian: Veisiejų seniūnija) is an eldership of Lithuania, located in the Lazdijai District Municipality. In 2021 its population was 3199.
