= Kučiūnai Eldership =

Eldership of Lithuania

The Kučiūnai Eldership (Lithuanian: Kučiūnų seniūnija) is an eldership of Lithuania, located in the Lazdijai District Municipality. In 2021 its population was 639.
