= Krosna Eldership =

Eldership of Lithuania

The Krosna Eldership (Lithuanian: Krosnos seniūnija) is an eldership of Lithuania, located in the Lazdijai District Municipality. In 2021 its population was 692.
