= Noragėliai Eldership =

Eldership of Lithuania

The Noragėliai Eldership (Lithuanian: Noragėliųv seniūnija) is an eldership of Lithuania, located in the Lazdijai District Municipality. In 2021 its population was 776.
