= Veisiejai =

- Town
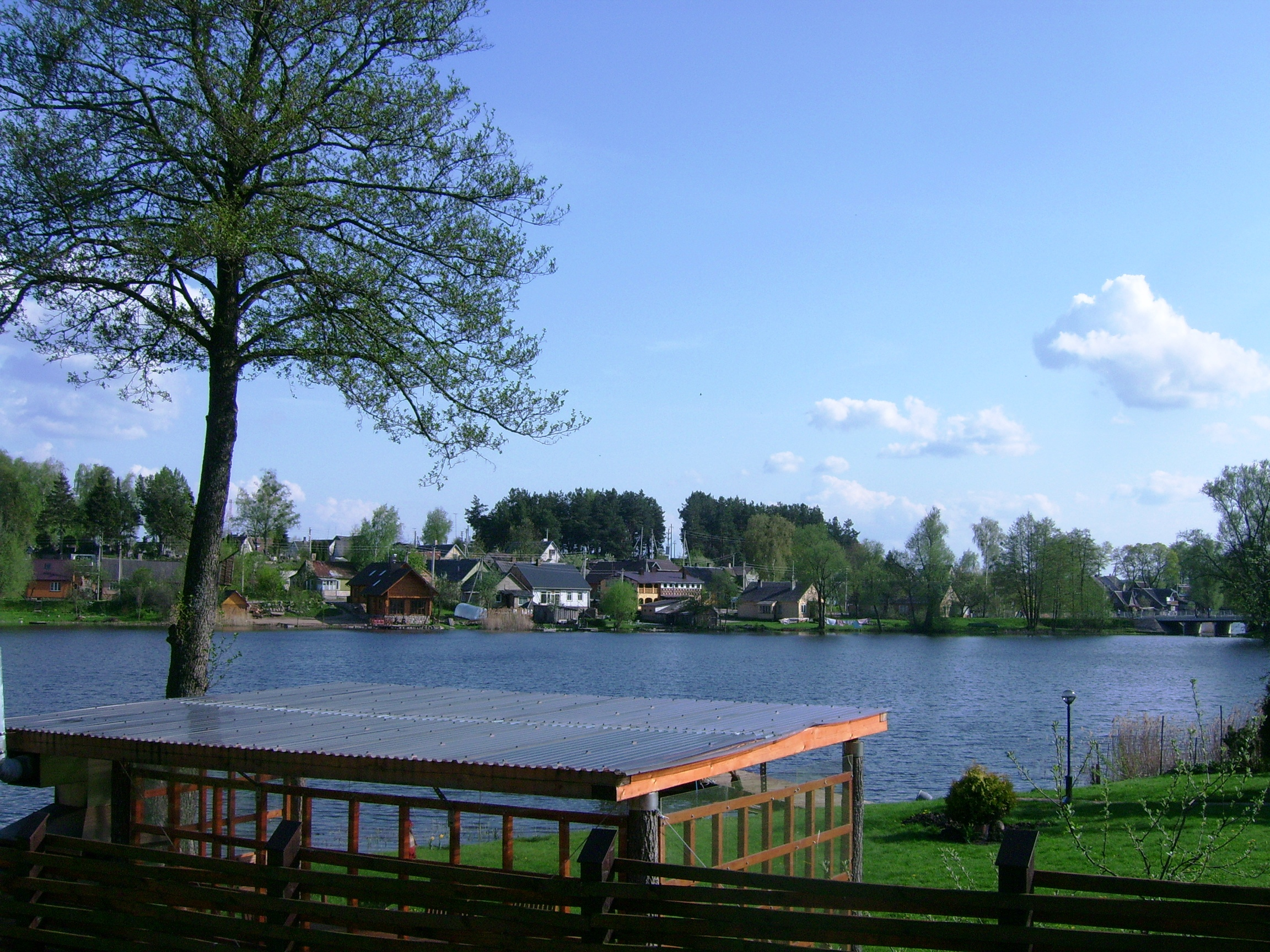
- Ančios lake and Veisiejai panorama

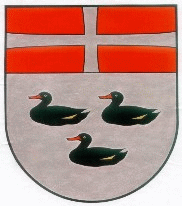
- Coat of arms

- Location of Veisiejai
- Coordinates: 54°6′0″N 23°42′0″E
- Country: Lithuania
- Ethnographic region: Dzūkija
- County: Alytus County
- Municipality: Lazdijai district municipality
- Eldership: Veisiejai eldership
- Capital of: Veisiejai eldership
- First mentioned: 1501
- Granted town rights: 1956

Population (2021)
  - Total: 1,141
- Time zone: UTC+2 (EET)
  - Summer (DST): UTC+3 (EEST)

Veisiejai (pronounced [vɛɪ̯ˑˈs̪ʲɪɛɪ̯ˑɛɪ̯ˑ]) is a town in the Lazdijai district municipality, Lithuania. It is located 18 km (11 mi) south-east of Lazdijai. The Esperanto language was created in Veisiejai where L. L. Zamenhof started his practice as an ophthalmologist in 1885. There is a church dedicated to St. George (built in 1817), an old estate with a park, high school, kindergarten "Ąžuoliukas", a post office (postal code LT-67043), a museum and monuments dedicated to the composer J. Neimontas and L. L. Zamenhof.

Veisiejai is one of a few towns that are located in a lake peninsula. The western part of the town is surrounded by a park from the 18th century. There are several lakes in the vicinity of the town. The biggest of them – Ančia – divides the town into two parts. Lake Snaigynas is in the east, Lake Vernijis in the north, and Lake Veisiejis in the southwest. The town is named after the lake Veisiejis which is situated 6 km south-west of Veisiejai.

The Vishay Intertechnology semiconductors manufacturer is named after this town. Its founder, Dr. Felix Zandman, chose the company name after his ancestral village, in memory of family members who were murdered in the Holocaust.

== Other names ==
Veisiejai is known as Wiejsieje in Polish, Visei in Yiddish and Veisee in Russian languages.

== History ==
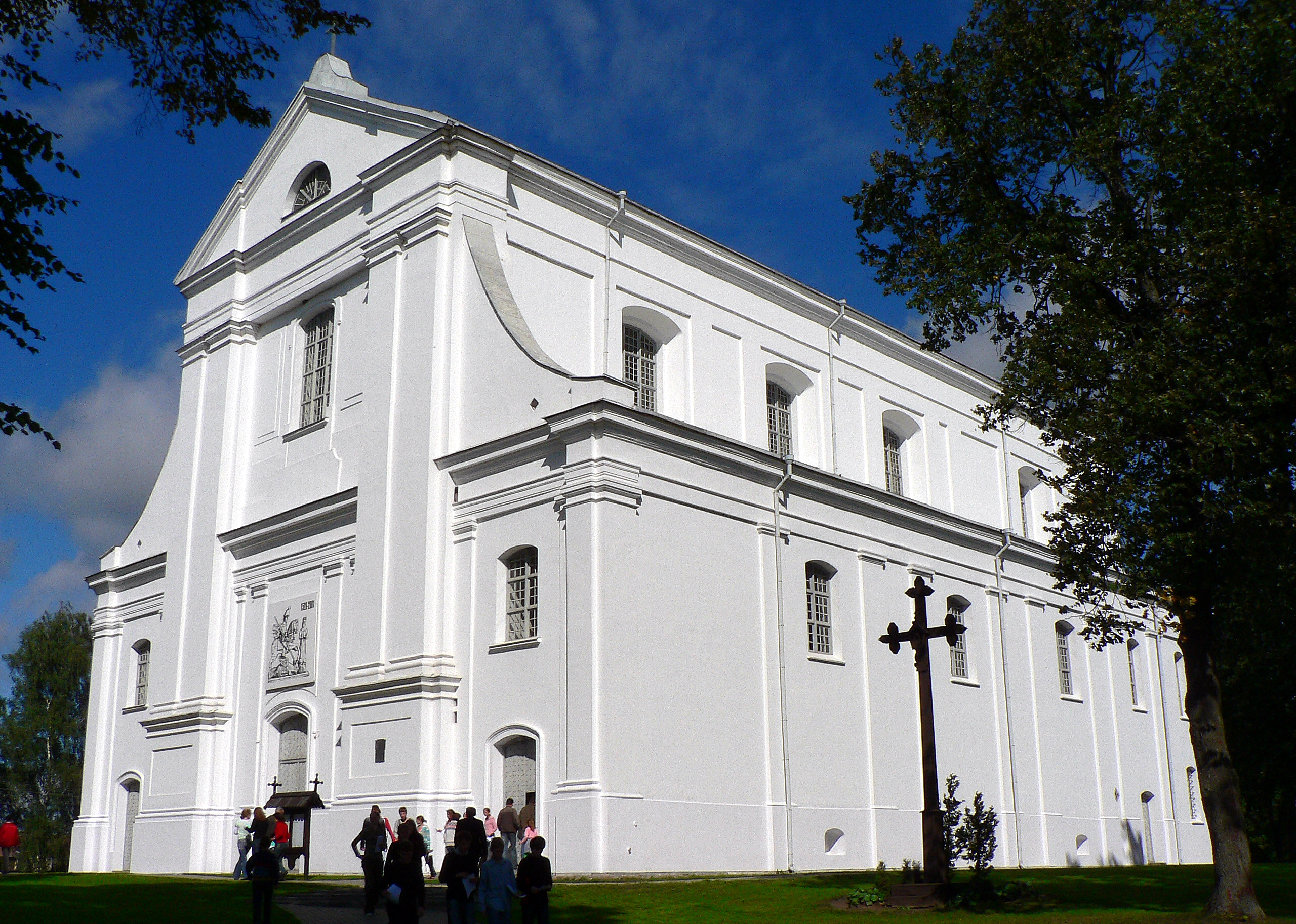
St. George church in Veisiejai (1767/1817)

Veisiejai was first mentioned as belonging to the Glinski family in 1501. It was later a property of the Massalski family and was subsequently inherited by the Ogiński family.

Yuri Olelkovich, Duke of Slutsk, managed to get market privilege in 1525 and built first church in 1526.

Veisiejai has a rare surviving wooden synagogue. Jews started to settle here in the early 18th century. The first synagogue was constructed in 1748. It was destroyed by fire and restored several times. A Jewish library and a Hebrew school operated in Versiejai before the war. During the German occupation, Veisiejai Jews were killed in the Katkiškė ghetto.

Between 1950 and 1959 Veisiejai was a district center. In 1956 it became a town. Its coat of arms was created by Laima Ramonienė and was approved by the President of Lithuania on March 23, 2000.

== Estate and park ==
An estate in Veisiejai was established in the 15th century. The Lithuanian hetman V. Massalski built a palace there in the 18th century. Only one wing survived until present time.

Veisiejai Estate Park, situated near the estate, is one of the oldest parks in Lithuania. An initiative from the Ogiński family in the 19th century, the park was redecorated to be a landscape park. In 1950–1959 the 17.5 ha area park was started to be maintained. 22 stores wheel of tilias and a growing ash tree of 30 m height and 5.1 size are important elements in the park. In 1988 a memorial was opened for L. L. Zamenhof, creator of the international language Esperanto.

== Eldership ==
Veisiejai town has a separate municipality status.
