= Samuel Bogusław Chyliński =

Samuel Bogusław Chyliński (Lithuanian: Samuelis Boguslavas Chilinskis) (1631–1668) was the translator and publisher of the first translation of the Bible into Lithuanian.

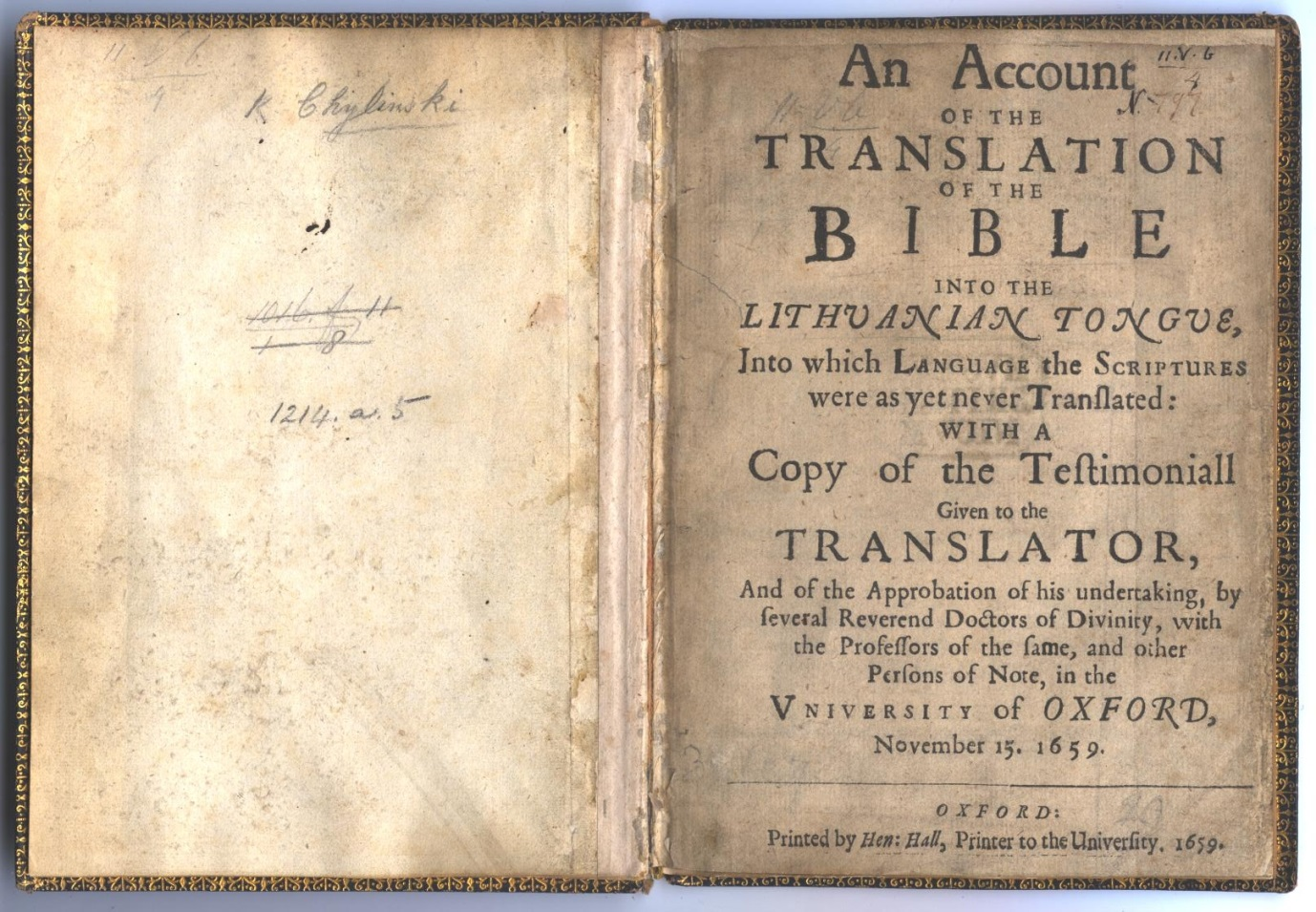
Samuel Boguslaus Chylinski, An Account of the Translation of the Bible into the Lithuanian Tongue (Oxford, 1659)

== Life ==
Samuel Bogusław Chyliński born in Šventežeris to a family of a Calvinist preacher Adrian Chyliński (1586–1656) and mother from the Lithuanian nobleman Minvydas branch. Samuel spoke Lithuanian since his childhood.

Apparently Chyliński studied in Franeker, Friesland, The Netherlands, before 1651 and was later staying in Britsum, Friesland according to an inscription in the church register of Britsum of 1651, in which a D (dominee = vicar) is put before his name. Since 1657 Chyliński studied in Oxford.

As a main source and reference for his Lithuanian Bible translation Chyliński used the Dutch Statenvertaling. He produced his work in Oxford and printed it in London. 15 Oxford professors signed a certificate that Chylinski was "a learned and polite scholar". In 1659, Chyliński published a pamphlet An account of the translation of the Bible into the Lithuanian tongue in English in which he claimed to have translated the whole of the Bible. The aim of the pamphlet was to raise funds for the printing of his translation. The printing of the translation started in 1660, but was interrupted due to disagreements among Lithuanian Protestants.

== Translation of the Bible ==
There are known three printed copies of Chylinski’s Bible - The Old Testament. The so-called Berlin copy is missing since World War II, the Vilnius copy has been lost since 1918, the only one surviving fragment of The Old Testament (176 pages) is in the British Library’s collections. The manuscript of The New Testament translation has also survived and being stored in the British Library.

== See also ==
- Lithuanian literature
- Jonas Bretkūnas
