= Avraham Tory =

Lithuanian Holocaust survivor (1909–2002)

Avraham Tory (Hebrew: אברהם טורי; 1909–2002) was a Jewish Lithuanian Holocaust survivor, diarist, and lawyer.

Tory kept a diary and archive detailing events in Lithuania's Kovno Ghetto from June 1941 to January 1944. As secretary of the Ghetto's Jewish Council of Elders, Tory had access to privileged information and documents. His detailed diary and secret archive were used as evidence in war crimes trials. He also served as a trial witness.

Tory's diary was published in Hebrew in 1988 and English in 1990. From 1998 to 2000, It served as the centerpiece for the United States Holocaust Memorial Museum's two-year exhibition, ''Surviving the Holocaust: The Kovno Ghetto Diary''. His original diary and archive are in the collection of Yad Vashem.

== Early life and education ==
Tory was born Avraham Golub in Lazdijai, Lithuania. He attended high school in Marijampolė, Lithuania and was active in the General Zionist youth movement. He attended law school at the University of Pittsburgh, but returned to Lithuania to finish his studies at the University of Kovno after the death of his father.

Tory was a gymnast and competed in the first Maccabiah Games (1932), a Jewish sporting competition in Tel Aviv. Following the Soviet annexation of Lithuania in 1940, Tory worked for the Soviet construction administration.

== The Holocaust ==
After the Soviets deemed Zionism to be "counter-revolutionary", Tory fled Kovno for the city of Vilna to avoid arrest and deportation to Siberia. He returned to a German-occupied Kovno in 1941, but soon attempted to flee again due to the German's persecution of Jews. Tory was prevented from crossing the border into Russia and was forced along with other local Jews into the Kovno Ghetto.

Tory was secretary of the Kovno Ghetto's Jewish Council of Elders, a body that was forced to administer German rules and regulations. His official secretary notes were used to generate the "And These Are The Laws—German Style" and the yearbook "Slobodka Ghetto 1942", two publications that are considered central records of the Kovno Ghetto.

As secretary, Tory had access to documents and records. He was also often present at conversations between Elchanan Elkes and members of the Gestapo. Elkes, a Jewish Lithuanian physician, was interned in Kovno Ghetto and appointed leader of the Jewish internees. While in the ghetto, Tory, with help from Pnina Oshpitz Sheinzon, kept a detailed diary and managed a secret archive made up of reports, armbands, and orders as well as clandestine photographs and artwork of ghetto prisoners.

Kovno Ghetto became a concentration camp in 1943. Tory used his outside connections to help Pnina and her daughter, Shulamit, escape in the September of the same year. Before escaping the camp himself on March 23, 1944, Tory buried his diary and the secret archive in five crates beneath Block C, an unfinished Soviet-era building. He included a note that said,

"With awe and reverence I am hiding in this crate what I have written, noted and collected with thrill and anxiety, so that it may serve as material evidence--’corpus delecti’--accusing testimony when the Day of Judgment comes.”

Tory, Pnina and her daughter survived until the liberation of Lithuania by hiding on a farm.

== Liberation and post war ==
Tory returned to Kovno after its August 1944 liberation and retrieved his diary and three crates from the archive. He took the crates to Poland where he gave them to a member of the Bricha.

Tory and Pnina married on August 10, 1944. Pnina's first husband, Pinchus Sheinzon, had been murdered at the Seventh Fort, a defense fortification that was used as the first concentration camp in Lithuania. With the Soviets now in control of Lithuania, Tory was again facing deportation to Siberia. He left Lithuania in 1945 for Poland and was joined by Pnina and Shulamit three weeks later.

Tory and his family settled in Tel Aviv in 1947. He changed his surname from Golub to Tory while in Israel. Tory established a law firm in Israel and was secretary general of the International Association of Jewish Lawyers and Jurors.

The Israeli ambassador to Romania helped Tory recover most of the remaining archive from Kovno.

== Legacy ==
=== Trials ===
Tory's meticulous records were used as evidence in the war crime trials of Lithuanian and German perpetrators including the mayor of Kovno and an SS officer that ordered the murder of 9,200 Jewish men, women, and children. Tory also served as a trial witness.

=== Diary and archive ===
Tory's diary, written in Yiddish, was published in Hebrew in 1988 and English in 1990. It was used as the central theme of the United States Holocaust Memorial Museum's exhibition, "Surviving the Holocaust: The Kovno Ghetto Diary".

The diary and archive are in the collection of Yad Vashem.

== Family ==
Tory and Pnina remained married until his death. In addition to Shulamit, they had two daughters together.

Tory died of natural causes at the age of 92 at his home in Tel Aviv.
