= Virginijus Savukynas =

Lithuanian journalist and cultural anthropologist (born 1974)

Virginijus Savukynas (born March 29, 1974, Lazdijai) is a Lithuanian journalist, cultural anthropologist

== Awards ==
- 2000: Award in Young Scholar's Competition. Academy of Sciences of Lithuania
- 2003: Award of the Lithuanian Journalists' Union, for the series "Omni laike" ("Always on Time") of interviews with famous Lithuanian journalists
- 2007: The prize "For national tolerance" from the Department of National Minorities and Emigrants
- 2015 Antanas Macijauskas prize in journalism for his series of history programs "History Detectives"
