= Šventežeris Eldership =

Eldership of Lithuania

The Šventežeris Eldership (Lithuanian: Šventežerio seniūnija) is an eldership of Lithuania, located in the Lazdijai District Municipality. In 2021 its population was 2024.
