= Šeštokai =

- Town
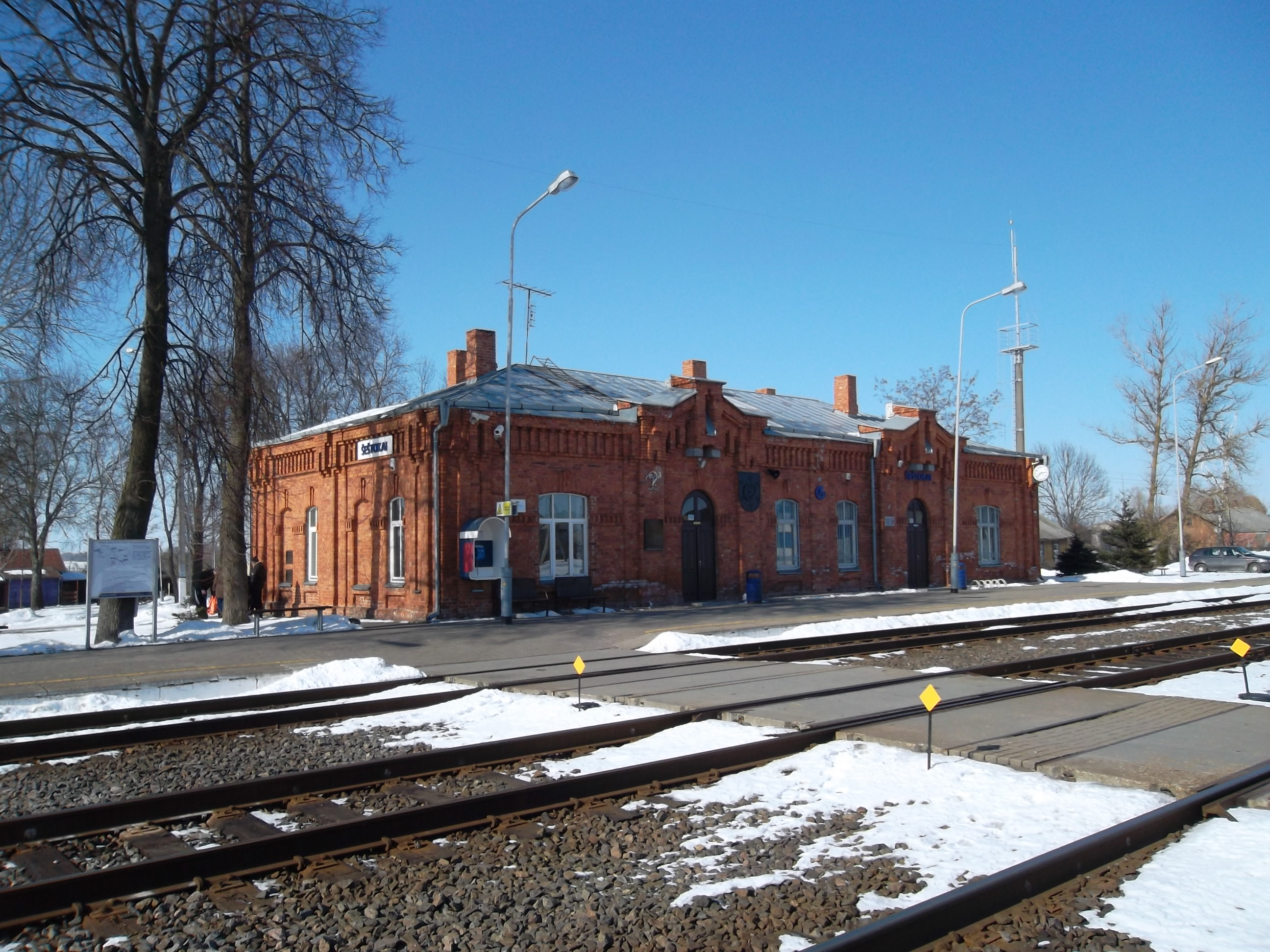
- Šeštokai Railway Station

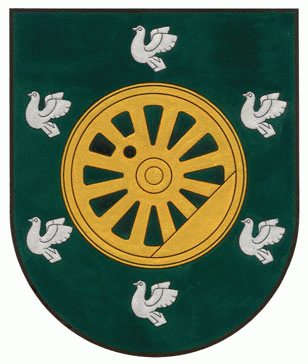
- Coat of arms

- Location of Šeštokai
- Coordinates: 54°22′0″N 23°26′0″E
- Country: Lithuania
- Ethnographic region: Dzūkija
- County: Alytus County
- Municipality: Lazdijai District Municipality
- Eldership: Šeštokai Eldership
- Capital of: Šeštokai Eldership

Population (2021)
  - Total: 516
- Time zone: UTC+2 (EET)
  - Summer (DST): UTC+3 (EEST)

Šeštokai is a small town in southern Lithuania.

== Infrastructure ==
The town is a transport hub as it hosts Šeštokai Intermodal Terminal and has dual gauge track as well as break-of-gauge for the 1435 mm standard gauge and 1520 mm broad gauge. It is also a major rail junction on the Rail Baltica I line from Poland to the city of Kaunas.
