= Kapčiamiestis Eldership =

Eldership of Lithuania

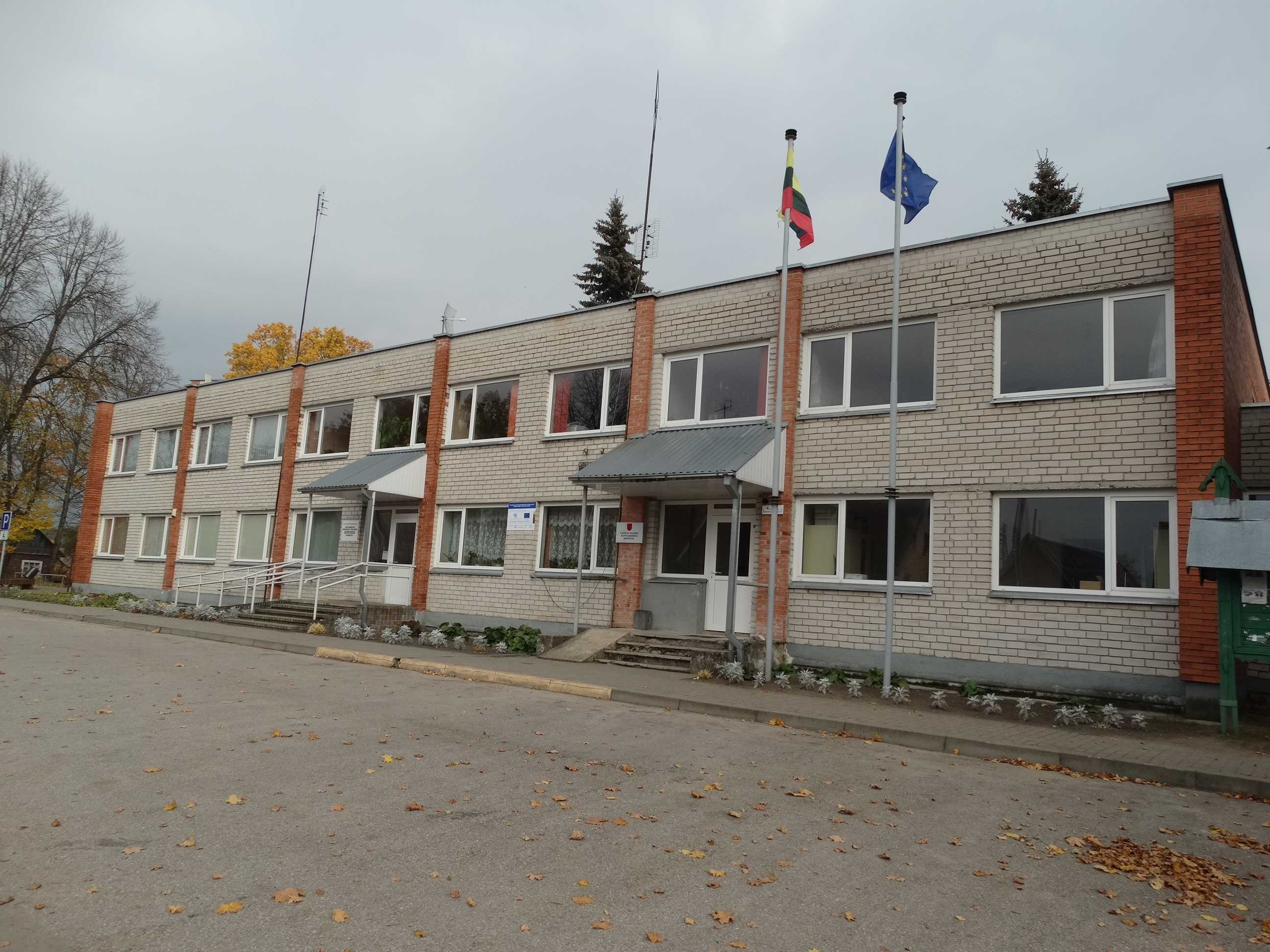
Kapčiamiestis Eldership

The Kapčiamiestis Eldership (Lithuanian: Kapčiamiesčio seniūnija) is an eldership of Lithuania, located in the Lazdijai District Municipality. In 2021 its population was 832.
