= Lazdijai District Municipality =

Lazdijai District Municipality Lazdijų rajono savivaldybė
- Municipality
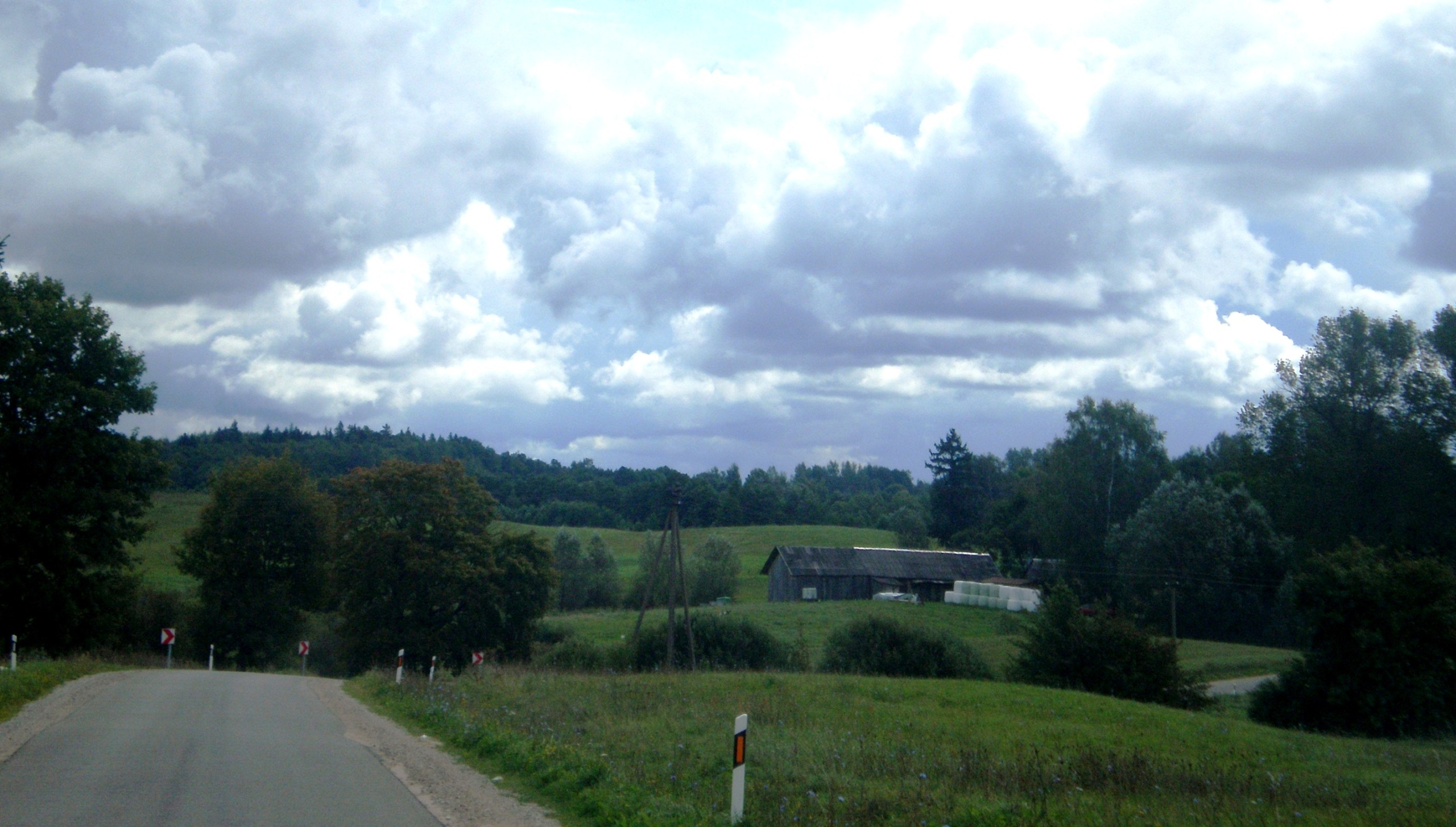

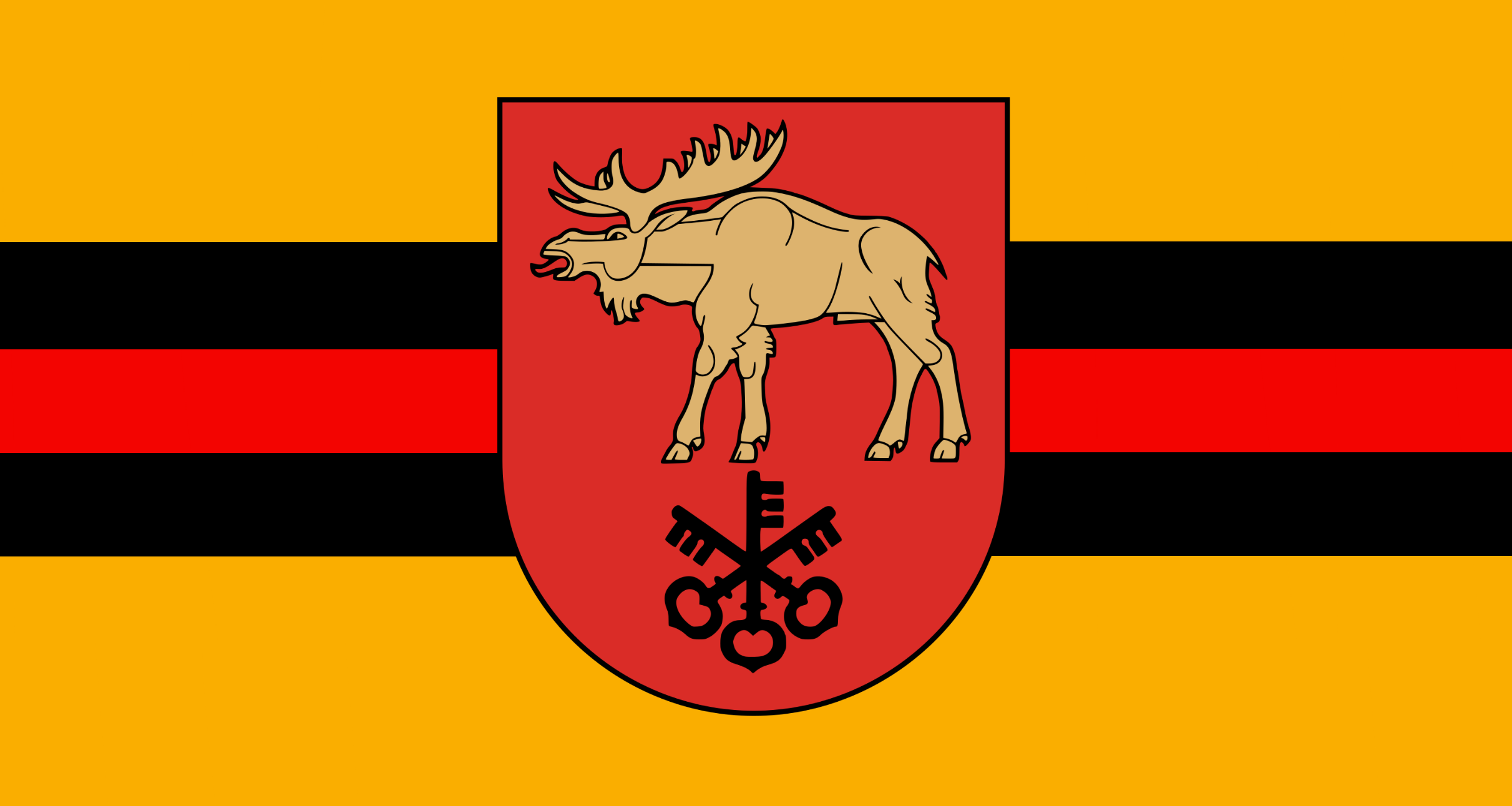
- Flag Coat of arms

- Location in Lithuania

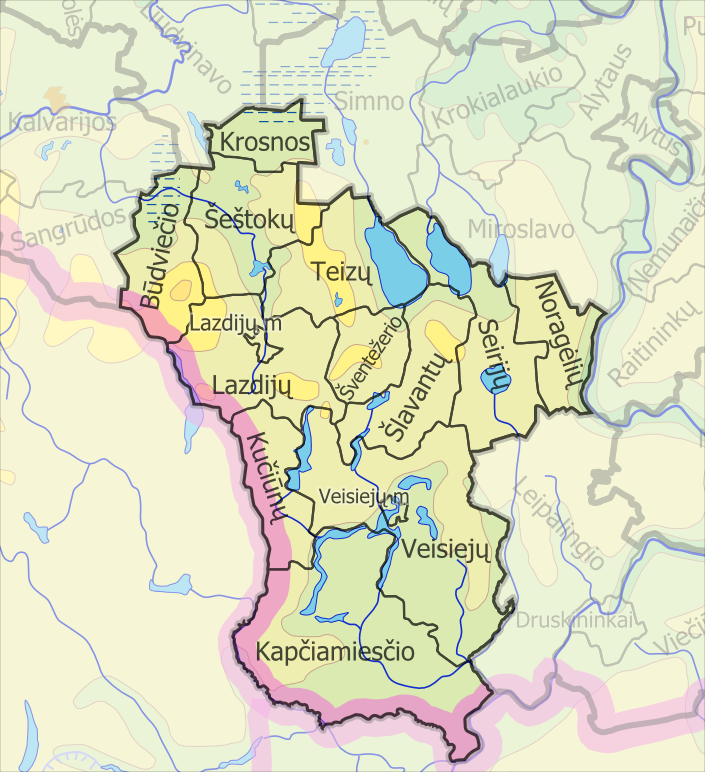
- Map of Lazdijai District Municipality
- Coordinates: 54°10′34″N 23°39′00″E
- Country: Lithuania
- Ethnographic region: Dzūkija
- County: Alytus County
- Capital: Lazdijai
- Elderships: 14

Area
  - Total: 1,309 km^{2} (505 sq mi)
  - Rank: 26th

Population (2021 estimate)
  - Total: 18,247
  - Rank: 46th
  - Density: 13.94/km^{2} (36.10/sq mi)
  - Rank: 52nd
- Time zone: UTC+2 (EET)
  - Summer (DST): UTC+3 (EEST)
- Telephone code: 318
- Major settlements: Lazdijai (pop. 3,932); Veisiejai (pop. 1,124); Seirijai (pop. 679)
- Website: www.lazdijai.lt

Lazdijai District Municipality (Lithuanian: Lazdijų rajono savivaldybė) is a municipality in Alytus County, Lithuania.

== Elderships ==
In 2001, the Lazdijai District Municipality is divided into 14 elderships (seniūnijos); the main town or village is listed for each.

1. Būdvietis Eldership – Aštrioji Kirsna
2. Kapčiamiestis Eldership – Kapčiamiestis
3. Krosna Eldership – Krosna
4. Kučiūnai Eldership – Kučiūnai
5. Lazdijai Eldership – Lazdijai
6. Lazdijai City Eldership – Lazdijai
7. Noragėliai Eldership – Noragėliai
8. Seirijai Eldership – Seirijai
9. Šeštokai Eldership – Šeštokai
10. Šlavantai Eldership – Avižieniai
11. Šventežeris Eldership – Šventežeris
12. Teizai Eldership – Teizai
13. Veisiejai Eldership – Veisiejai
14. Veisiejai City Eldership – Veisiejai

== Population by locality ==
2011 Census
Locality	Status	Total	Male	Female
Lazdijų d. mun.		22,455	10,610	11,845
Būdvietis Eldership		1,061	503	558
Aštrioji Kirsna	K	60	32	28
Bielėnai	K	25	12	13
Bilvyčiai	K	17	9	8
Bulotiškė	K	5	2	3
Burbiškiai	K	1	1	0
Būdvietis	K	171	86	85
Dainavėlė	K	32	15	17
Derviniai	K	37	11	26
Dzūkai	K	160	76	84
Filicijanavas	K	0	0	0
Gurčiškė	K	6	3	3
Inkištai	K	0	0	0
Jaseniauka	K	1	0	1
Kelmaičiai	K	10	4	6
Kybartai	K	5	1	4
Mastauka	K	0	0	0
Natalina	K	2	1	1
Pagrūdai	K	23	11	12
Paliūnai	K	89	42	47
Papartėliai	K	96	48	48
Strumbagalvė	K	101	48	53
Varnakampis	K	7	3	4
Vidzgailai	K	141	68	73
Vilkakarčemė	K	0	0	0
Vilkinyčia	K	0	0	0
Vingrėnai	K	10	3	7
Virbalai	K	33	16	17
Vosyliškė, Lazdijai	K	0	0	0
Zelionka	K	29	11	18
Kapčiamiestis Eldership		1,069	506	563
Alekniškiai	K	3	1	2
Bugieda	K	24	14	10
Burbai	K	3	2	1
Dumbliauskai	K	22	10	12
Gerveliai	K	2	1	1
Gryckavas	K	0	0	0
Gulbiniškė	K	17	9	8
Ivoškai	K	20	9	11
Jančiuliai	K	17	10	7
Jezdas	K	4	1	3
Kalviai	K	14	7	7
Kapčiamiestis	MST	589	269	320
Kareivonys	K	27	14	13
Kauknoris	K	1	1	0
Kuodžiai	K	1	0	1
Macevičiai	K	2	0	2
Menciškė	K	25	14	11
Mėčiūnai	K	42	18	24
Mikališkė	K	12	7	5
Nasūtai	K	13	4	9
Navikai	K	5	4	1
Pabūdavietis	K	0	0	0
Padumbliai	K	49	21	28
Palačionys	K	1	0	1
Paulenka	K	0	0	0
Paveisininkai	K	7	3	4
Pertakas	K	5	3	2
Purviniai	K	3	2	1
Semoškai	K	26	13	13
Simaniškė	K	1	0	1
Sirguškė	K	6	4	2
Stalai	K	1	1	0
Subačiai	K	6	2	4
Sventijanskas	K	15	10	5
Vainežeris	K	14	7	7
Vainiūnai	K	16	6	10
Valentai	K	36	17	19
Varviškė	K	32	18	14
Volskai	K	3	2	1
Žmirklės	K	5	2	3
Krosna Eldership		918	449	469
Birsčiai	K	155	78	77
Grabauka	K	30	18	12
Krasenka	K	18	8	10
Krosna	MST	330	143	187
Naujavalakiai	K	5	2	3
Olendrai	K	13	6	7
Pėdiškiai	K	25	13	12
Ramanavas	K	139	76	63
Saltininkai	K	40	20	20
Tūriškiai	K	43	20	23
Vartai	K	113	61	52
Vytautiškė	K	7	4	3
Kučiūnai Eldership		805	405	400
Akmeniai, Lazdijai	K	121	57	64
Aradninkai	K	11	6	5
Briniai	K	3	1	2
Kalėdiškiai	K	16	10	6
Kaženiai	K	11	6	5
Kučiūnai	K	273	133	140
Miškiniai	K	286	153	133
Pazapsiai	K	57	23	34
Pieniuočė	K	0	0	0
Puodžiškė	K	18	12	6
Saločiai	K	0	0	0
Sapiegiškiai	K	9	4	5
Zelionka	K	0	0	0
Lazdijai City Eldership		4,531	2,122	2,409
Lazdijai	M	4,531	2,122	2,409
Lazdijai Eldership		2,538	1,193	1,345
Agariniai	K	44	20	24
Aukštakalniai	K	11	5	6
Avižonys	K	51	22	29
Bagatelius	K	0	0	0
Bajoriškiai	K	151	76	75
Balabostė	K	4	3	1
Beviršiai	K	6	4	2
Bukta	K	5	3	2
Buniškiai	K	42	20	22
Būda	K	5	3	2
Dyviliškiai	K	57	26	31
Dumblis	K	18	8	10
Elveriškė	K	10	6	4
Elzbietina	K	0	0	0
Galiniai	K	19	9	10
Gilbietis	K	5	4	1
Giraitėliai	K	9	5	4
Grikapalis	K	10	4	6
Janaslavas	K	20	6	14
Juozapavas	K	2	1	1
Jurčiūnai	K	33	15	18
Kaimeliai	K	11	5	6
Karkliniškė	K	0	0	0
Karužai	K	98	48	50
Kasteletiškė	K	2	0	2
Katkiškė	K	5	2	3
Keistutiškė	K	0	0	0
Kelmynai	K	12	6	6
Kirtiliškė	K	29	12	17
Klapotkė	K	0	0	0
Kukliai	K	192	86	106
Lazdijai	K	468	214	254
Leonardavas	K	5	2	3
Marčiukonys	K	15	9	6
Nekrūnai	K	12	6	6
Nemajūnai	K	237	120	117
Neravai	K	91	45	46
Neravėliai	K	0	0	0
Padumbliai	K	6	2	4
Panarvė	K	43	17	26
Papalazdijai I	K	87	37	50
Papalazdijai II	K	28	17	11
Puodžiai	K	0	0	0
Rimietis	K	2	1	1
Rudamina	MST	256	106	150
Rudamina	K	15	7	8
Salos	K	144	71	73
Skaistučiai	K	38	20	18
Staidarai	K	53	29	24
Stankūnai	K	9	4	5
Šadžiūnai	K	15	7	8
Šulneliai	K	15	7	8
Švedakampis	K	0	0	0
Tarnauka	K	8	4	4
Ūdininkai	K	3	3	0
Vieštartai	K	38	19	19
Žemaitkiemis	K	99	47	52
Noragėliai Eldership		1,018	486	532
Buciniškė	K	1	0	1
Dubravai	K	4	3	1
Ginčionys	K	64	29	35
Gudonys	K	72	40	32
Juozapavičiai	K	58	31	27
Krikštonys	K	228	101	127
Kučiuliškė	K	0	0	0
Makariškė	K	6	3	3
Mangarotas	K	21	9	12
Mankūnėliai	K	87	45	42
Noragėliai	K	108	52	56
Onciškiai	K	43	20	23
Raičiai	K	41	21	20
Seiliūnai	K	146	63	83
Seirijočiai	K	85	40	45
Šlapikai	K	1	0	1
Vosbūčiai	K	39	21	18
Žilvičiai	K	14	8	6
Seirijai Eldership		2,174	1,016	1,158
Akuočiai	K	43	20	23
Bagdononys	K	99	48	51
Baraučiškė	K	18	9	9
Barčiūnai	K	23	10	13
Bestraigiškė	K	5	2	3
Buckūnai	K	103	56	47
Bukaučiai	K	31	15	16
Cibūliai	K	13	6	7
Cijūniškė	K	10	5	5
Gervėnai	K	105	49	56
Graužai	K	9	6	3
Jonkiškė	K	7	3	4
Kudrėnėliai	K	13	5	8
Lapšius	K	50	20	30
Linksmoji	K	11	5	6
Meteliai	K	195	86	109
Miesto Kolonija	K	28	11	17
Mockonys	K	8	5	3
Nakrūniškė	K	15	9	6
Okta	K	18	12	6
Paročkė	K	0	0	0
Paserninkai	K	82	38	44
Pošnia	K	25	16	9
Raganiškė	K	6	2	4
Ročkiai	K	75	36	39
Rusonys	K	37	19	18
Seirijai	MST	788	358	430
Statiškė	K	21	9	12
Straigiškė	K	21	9	12
Šilaičiai	K	3	2	1
Vaickūniškė	K	30	14	16
Vainiūnai	K	105	45	60
Žagariai	K	177	86	91
Šeštokai Eldership		1,674	771	903
Barava	K	1	1	0
Biruta	K	42	22	20
Bludiškiai	K	1	0	1
Būda	K	1	1	0
Čėsniškė	K	3	2	1
Delnica	K	4	3	1
Delnickai	K	9	3	6
Didžioji Kirsna	K	89	41	48
Ėgliškiai	K	4	2	2
Gembašilis	K	4	1	3
Gudeliškė	K	12	4	8
Gumbeliai	K	12	7	5
Išlandžiai	K	0	0	0
Jukneliškė	K	115	51	64
Kirsnelė	K	79	39	40
Krosnėnai	K	60	27	33
Lopiškiai	K	16	7	9
Maišymai	K	53	24	29
Makaučiškė	K	5	3	2
Mikniškiai	K	120	58	62
Naujoji Kirsna	K	156	76	80
Pakirsniai	K	54	26	28
Roliai	K	64	30	34
Smalininkai	K	0	0	0
Šeštokai	K	12	5	7
Šeštokai	MST	686	305	381
Šilėnai	K	11	5	6
Tautrimai	K	61	28	33
Šlavantai Eldership		590	283	307
Aleksiejiškė	K	8	5	3
Avižieniai	K	245	118	127
Babrai	K	84	40	44
Bajoriškė	K	0	0	0
Buteliūnai	K	60	26	34
Demeniškiai	K	29	15	14
Gegutė	K	31	14	17
Kanaukai	K	6	4	2
Mikabaliai	K	40	18	22
Naujasodis	K	4	1	3
Paliūnai	K	39	21	18
Spartai	K	22	10	12
Šlavantai	K	19	11	8
Vabaliūnai	K	3	0	3
Šventežeris Eldership		919	448	471
Babrai	K	47	24	23
Burakavas	K	20	8	12
Ežerėliai	K	38	17	21
Janėnai	K	107	53	54
Mikyčiai	K	217	103	114
Prapuntai	K	24	13	11
Raistai	K	0	0	0
Straigiai	K	89	42	47
Sutrė	K	1	0	1
Šventežeris	K	72	33	39
Šventežeris	MST	295	150	145
Žališkė	K	9	5	4
Teizai Eldership		1,361	644	717
Babrauninkai	K	33	17	16
Bakšiai	K	4	3	1
Barčiai	K	102	47	55
Giraitė	K	43	21	22
Gurčiškė	K	12	5	7
Kamenka	K	19	10	9
Kurdimakščiai	K	20	9	11
Lozarka	K	7	3	4
Marinka	K	4	2	2
Murgai	K	0	0	0
Padusys	K	11	5	6
Pagiriai	K	0	0	0
Papečiai	K	57	25	32
Petravičiai	K	41	19	22
Prelomčiškė	K	13	3	10
Pryga	K	55	28	27
Randiškė	K	30	15	15
Sabinavas	K	10	6	4
Seimeniškiai	K	87	40	47
Skovagaliai	K	38	19	19
Staigūnai	K	10	4	6
Stebuliai	K	135	67	68
Teizai	K	288	139	149
Teizininkai	K	75	33	42
Vaideliotai	K	7	3	4
Verstaminai	K	251	117	134
Zebrėnai	K	7	3	4
Znica	K	2	1	1
Veisiejai City Eldership		1,430	661	769
Veisiejai	M	1,430	661	769
Veisiejai Eldership		2,367	1,123	1,244
Abarauskai	K	11	6	5
Ančios	K	3	1	2
Barčiai	K	167	78	89
Barteliai	K	12	6	6
Bebrai	K	0	0	0
Bertašiūnai	K	13	7	6
Beržiniai	K	10	5	5
Čivonys	K	58	31	27
Dainaviškiai	K	65	26	39
Druskininkėliai	K	4	2	2
Dulgininkai	K	0	0	0
Dvarčiškė	K	15	10	5
Galstai	K	22	13	9
Gudeliai	K	51	25	26
Ilgininkai	K	16	7	9
Jakonys	K	8	5	3
Juškonys	K	63	35	28
Kailiniai	K	446	191	255
Kalveliai	K	95	40	55
Klepočiai	K	64	30	34
Kuolonys	K	22	12	10
Laibagaliai	K	29	12	17
Mikalina	K	10	5	5
Murgeliai	K	0	0	0
Neliubonys	K	20	10	10
Norkūnai	K	0	0	0
Novartiškė	K	3	2	1
Paliepis	K	23	11	12
Paliūnai	K	13	6	7
Paterai	K	22	12	10
Paveisiejai	K	29	10	19
Petroškai	K	126	53	73
Pšeima	K	0	0	0
Purviškė	K	0	0	0
Radvilonys	K	76	38	38
Rūda	K	53	29	24
Sakniava	K	27	17	10
Saltoniškė	K	25	12	13
Salučiai	K	10	5	5
Senkonys	K	36	19	17
Smališkė	K	7	3	4
Smarliūnai	K	62	31	31
Snaigynas	K	11	4	7
Šadžiūnai	K	74	37	37
Šapurai	K	36	15	21
Šilainė	K	0	0	0
Šutronys	K	17	6	11
Taikūnai	K	35	17	18
Valančiūnai	K	0	0	0
Varnėnai	K	210	106	104
Viktarinas	K	124	66	58
Vilkininkai	K	50	27	23
Vytautai	K	84	39	45
Žvikeliai	K	10	1	9

- Status: M, MST - city, town / K, GST - village / VS - steading
