= Lazdijai =

- City
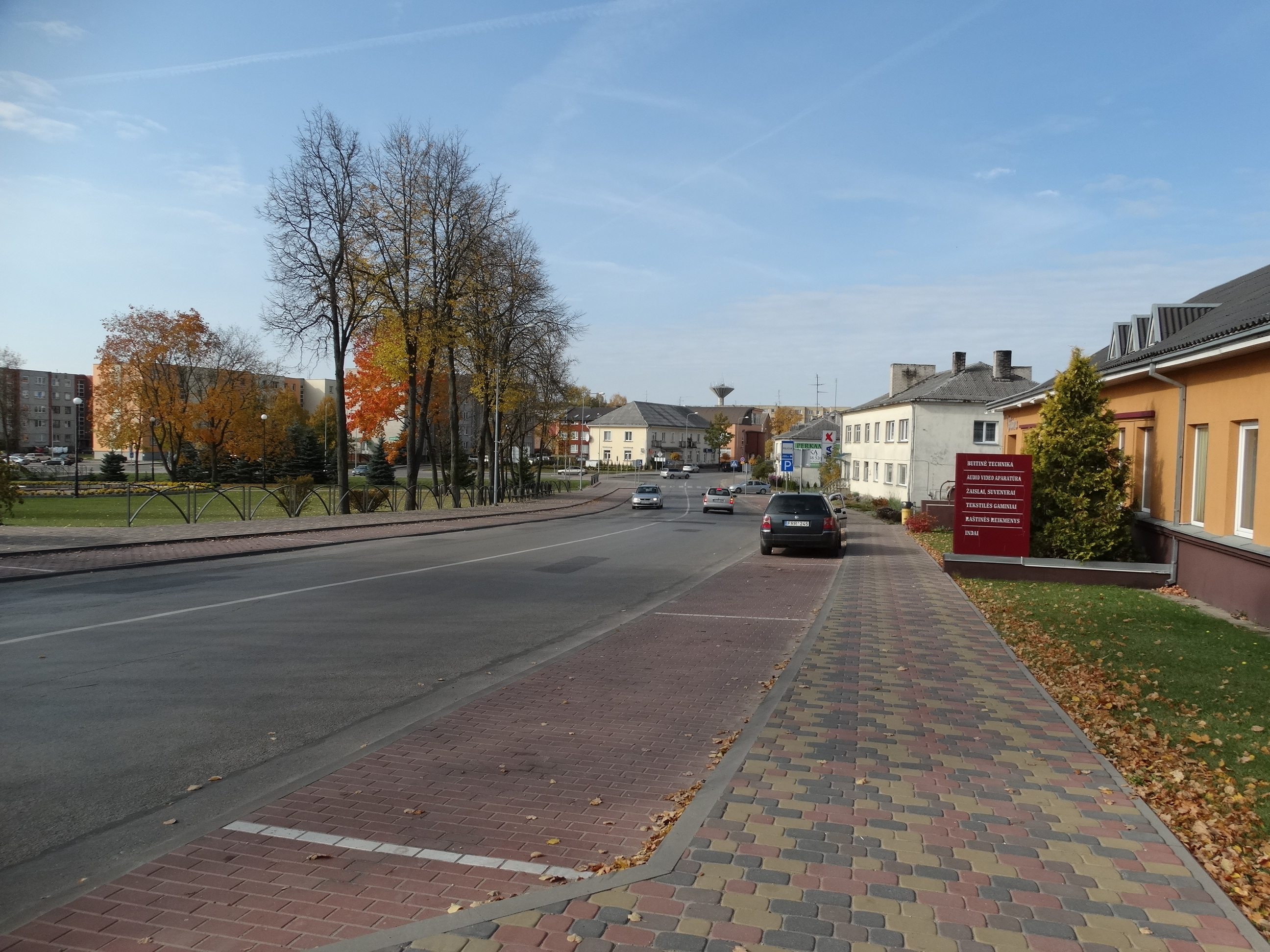
- Vilnius Street in Lazdijai

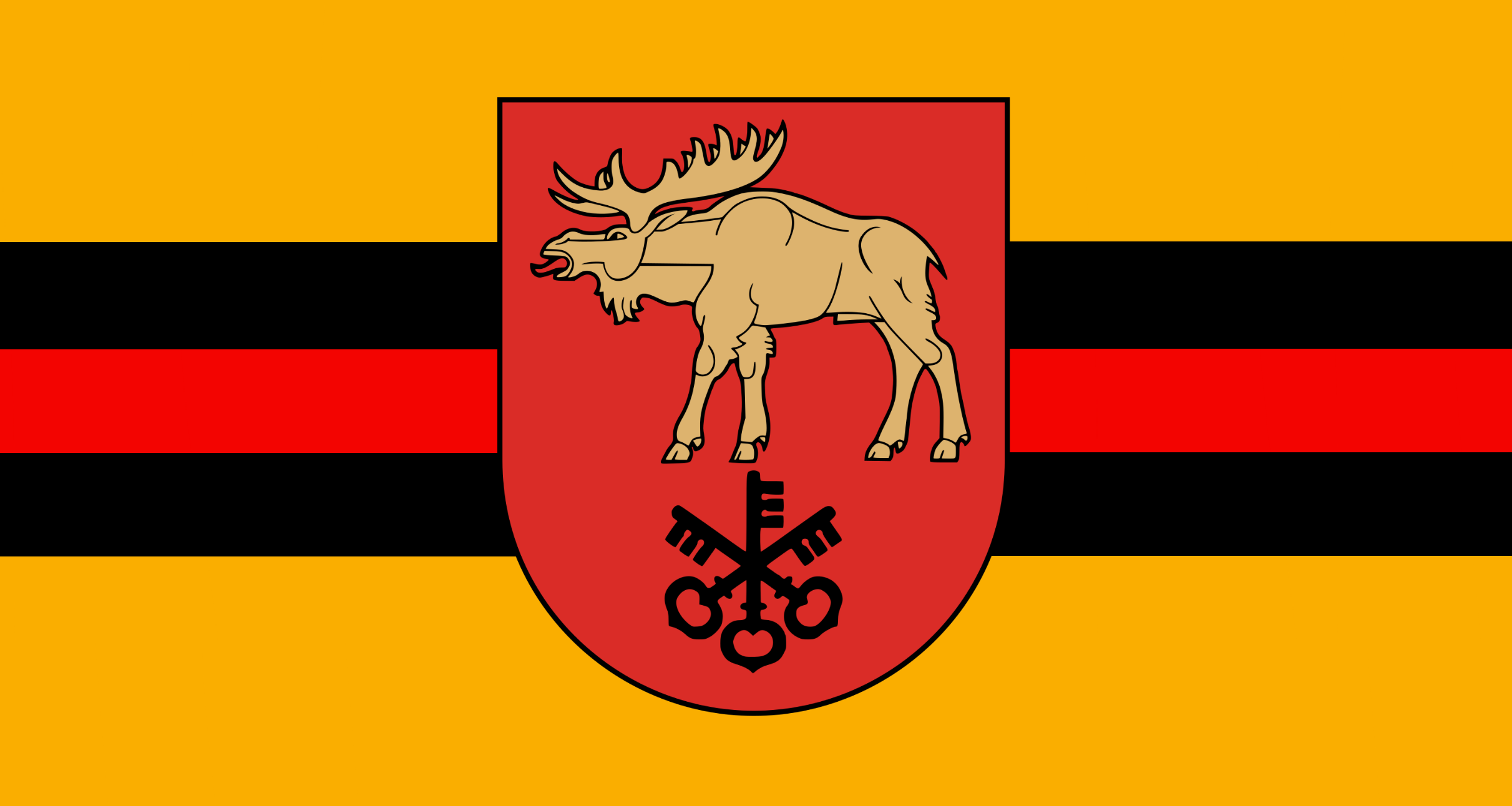
- Flag Coat of arms

- Location of Lazdijai
- Coordinates: 54°14′N 23°31′E
- Country: Lithuania
- Ethnographic region: Dzūkija
- County: Alytus County
- Municipality: Lazdijai district municipality
- Eldership: Lazdijai city eldership
- Capital of: Lazdijai district municipality Lazdijai city eldership Lazdijai rural eldership
- First mentioned: 1570
- Granted city rights: 1597

Government
  - Type: District Municipality Council
  - Body: Lazdijai District Municipality Council
  - Mayor: Ausma Miškinienė (DSVL)

Area
  - Total: 5 km^{2} (1.9 sq mi)

Population (2020)
  - Total: 4,110
- Time zone: UTC+2 (EET)
  - Summer (DST): UTC+3 (EEST)

Lazdijai (Polish: Łożdżeje) is a city (miestas) in Lithuania located about seven kilometres (4 1/2 mi) east of the border with Poland.

== History ==
It was established by Sigismund II Augustus in 1570 and granted Magdeburg town rights by Sigismund III Vasa in 1587. A local parish church was founded at the time. In 1689 John III Sobieski allowed the settlement of Jews.

During World War II, Lazdijai was under German occupation from late June 1941 until 31 July 1944. On November 3, 1941, 1,535 Jews were murdered in Lazdijai, including 485 men, 511 women and 539 children The perpetrators were members of the Rollkommando Hamann and local Lithuanian policemen.

In 1990 Lithuania declared independence from the Soviet Union, and new check points between the borders Poland and Lithuania were established, and Lazdijai became the center that oversees and continues to regulate these operations. It’s in the middle of the Sulwaki Gap.

== Climate ==
Climate data for Lazdijai (1991–2020 normals)
Month	Jan	Feb	Mar	Apr	May	Jun	Jul	Aug	Sep	Oct	Nov	Dec	Year
Mean daily maximum °C (°F)	−0.7 (30.7)	0.5 (32.9)	5.4 (41.7)	13.2 (55.8)	18.7 (65.7)	21.9 (71.4)	24.0 (75.2)	23.5 (74.3)	17.9 (64.2)	11.1 (52.0)	4.8 (40.6)	0.8 (33.4)	11.8 (53.2)
Daily mean °C (°F)	−3.2 (26.2)	−2.9 (26.8)	0.3 (32.5)	6.4 (43.5)	11.6 (52.9)	14.9 (58.8)	17.4 (63.3)	16.6 (61.9)	12.1 (53.8)	6.7 (44.1)	2.1 (35.8)	−1.4 (29.5)	6.7 (44.1)
Mean daily minimum °C (°F)	−5.5 (22.1)	−5 (23)	−2.4 (27.7)	2.5 (36.5)	7.3 (45.1)	10.7 (51.3)	13.2 (55.8)	12.3 (54.1)	8.3 (46.9)	4.1 (39.4)	0.5 (32.9)	−3.5 (25.7)	3.5 (38.4)
Average precipitation mm (inches)	42 (1.7)	36 (1.4)	38 (1.5)	39 (1.5)	56 (2.2)	75 (3.0)	95 (3.7)	69 (2.7)	57 (2.2)	53 (2.1)	43 (1.7)	46 (1.8)	649 (25.5)
Average relative humidity (%)	87	84	77	68	68	71	74	74	79	84	89	89	79
Source: Lithuanian Hydrometeorological Service

== Etymology ==
Lazdijai gets its name from the river Lazdija (also known as Raišupis), which runs through the city. It is, however, unclear where the name for the river comes. One possibility is that the name Raišupis is likely of Sudovian origin, having a meaning related to nuts, while the lithuanian word for hazels is lazdynai, possibly birthing the river's alternative name lazdija and the city name Lazdijai.

Throughout the history the city belonged to various powers and accordingly was known under various names: Polish: Łoździeje, German: Lasdien, Russian: Лаздияй, romanized: Lazdiyay. Also, the Jewish population of the city called it Lazdei (Yiddish: לאַזדיי, לאַזדיי). See also Names of Lithuanian places in other languages.

== Notable people ==
- Salomėja Nėris worked here as a teacher of German during 1928-1930
- Motiejus Gustaitis worked as principal of a coed gymnasium in Lazdijai.
- Adolfas Ramanauskas graduated from a Lazdijai secondary school

=== Birthplace ===
- Joseph Achron
- Marijonas Mikutavičius
- Virginijus Savukynas, Lithuanian journalist
- Avraham Tory, Jewish Lithuanian Holocaust survivor, diarist, and lawyer
- Arūnas Valinskas

== Gallery ==
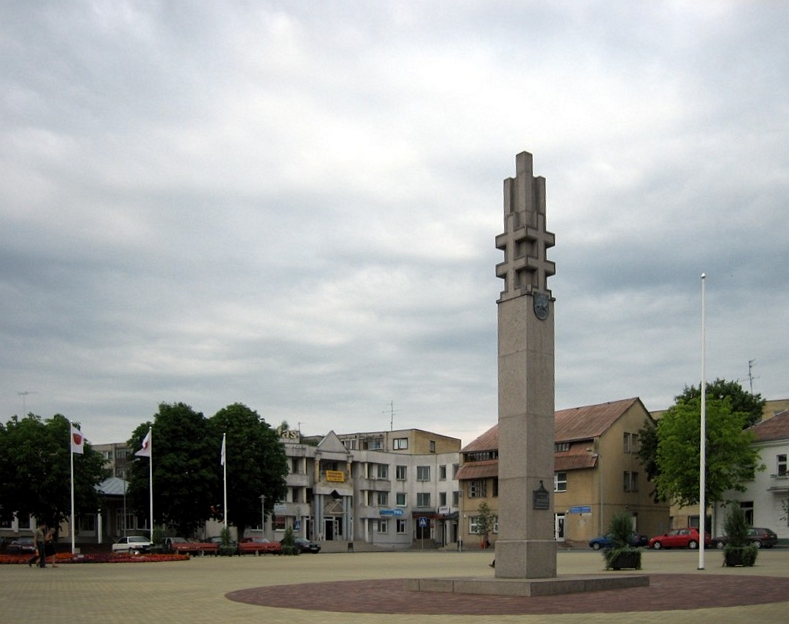
Independence Square

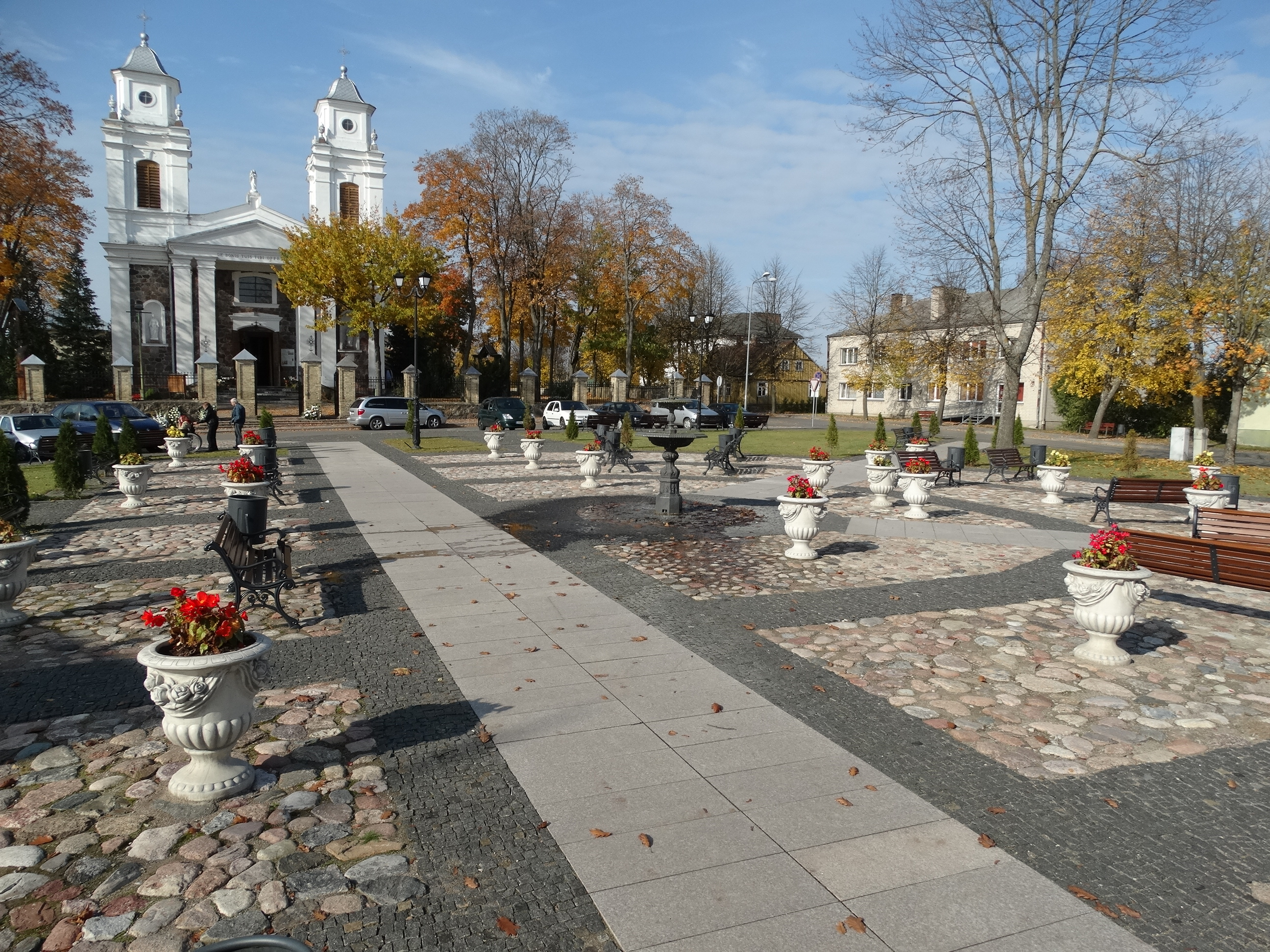
Square near the church

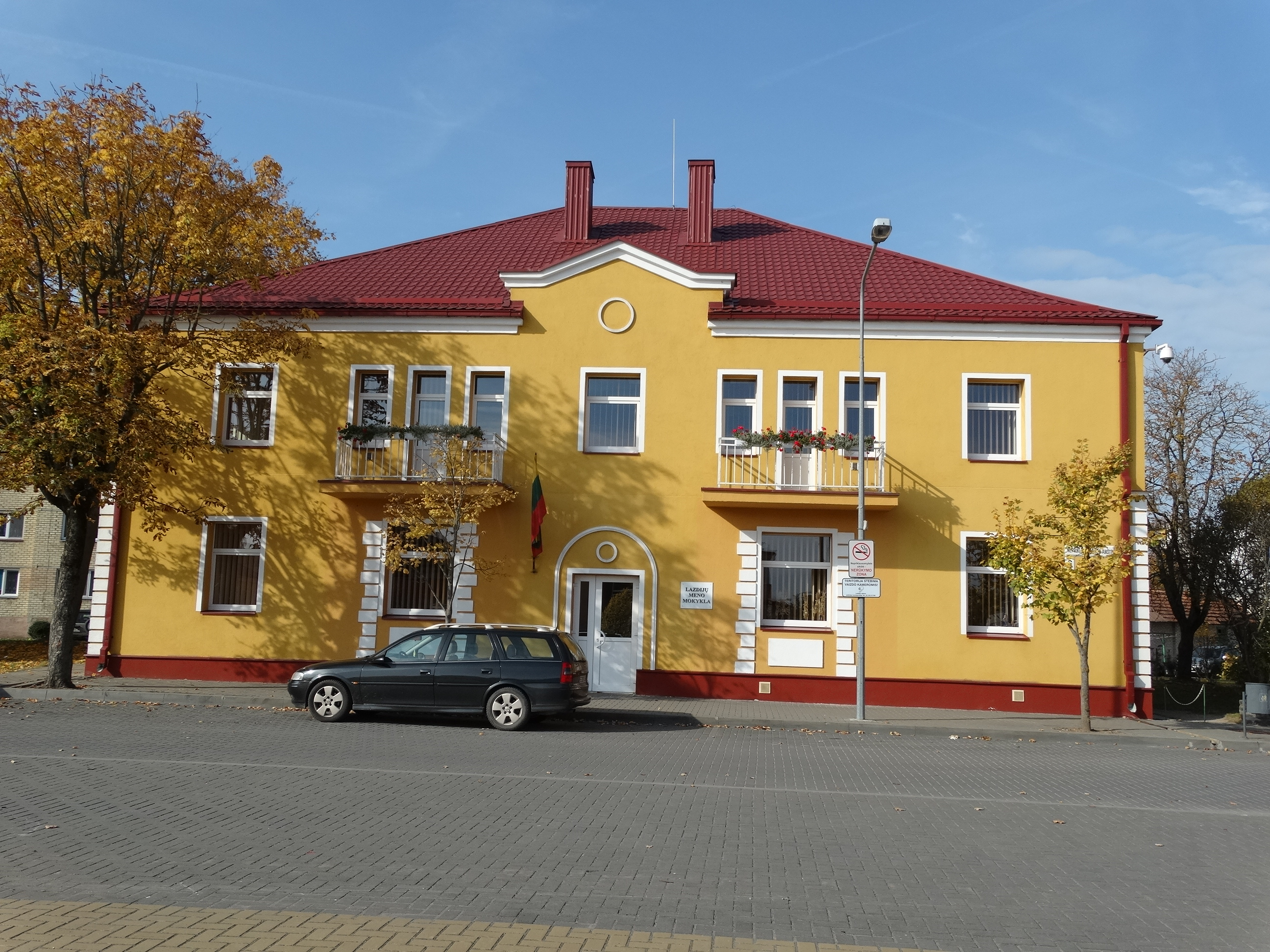
School of Arts

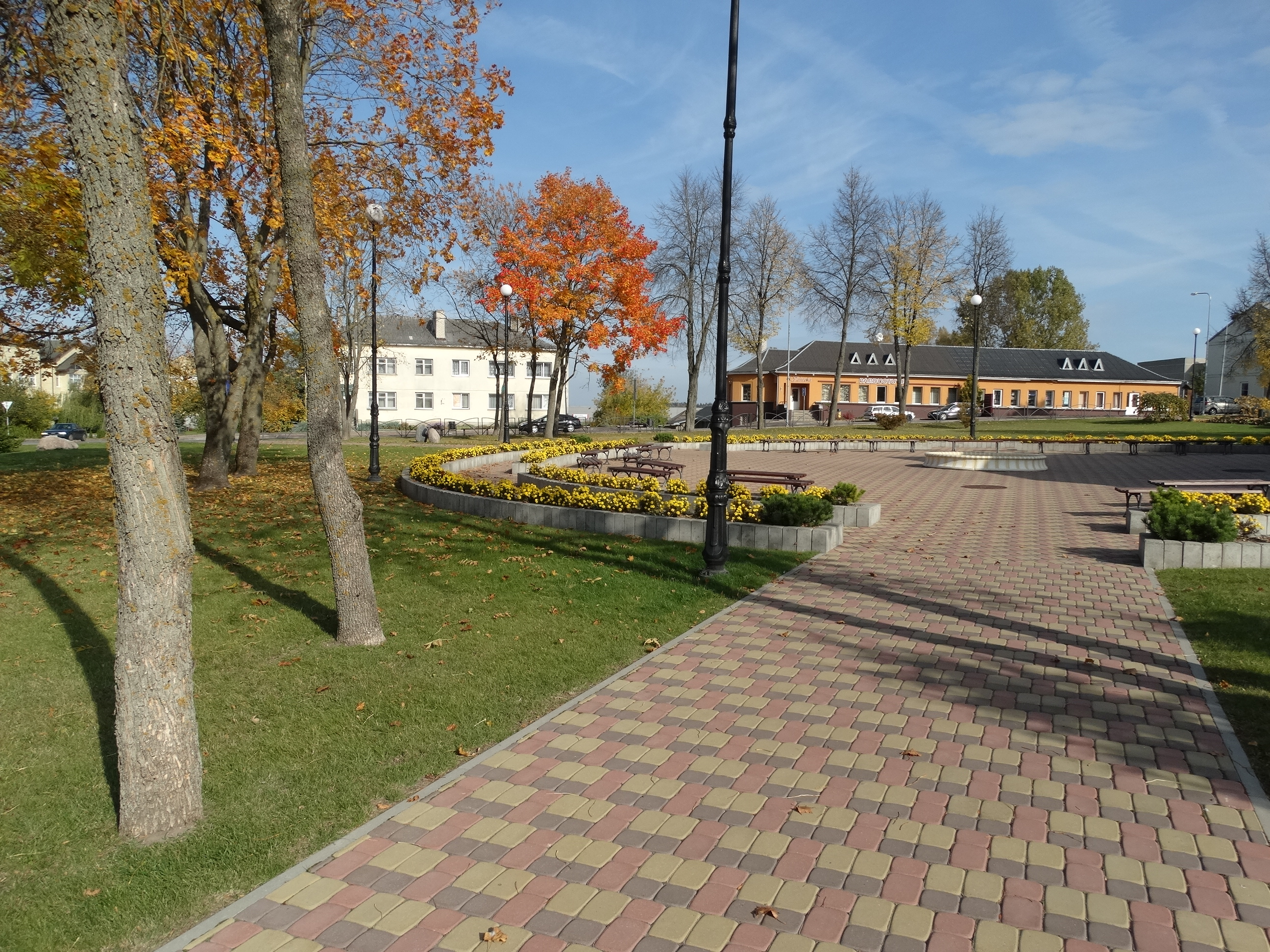
Square near the Cultural Centre

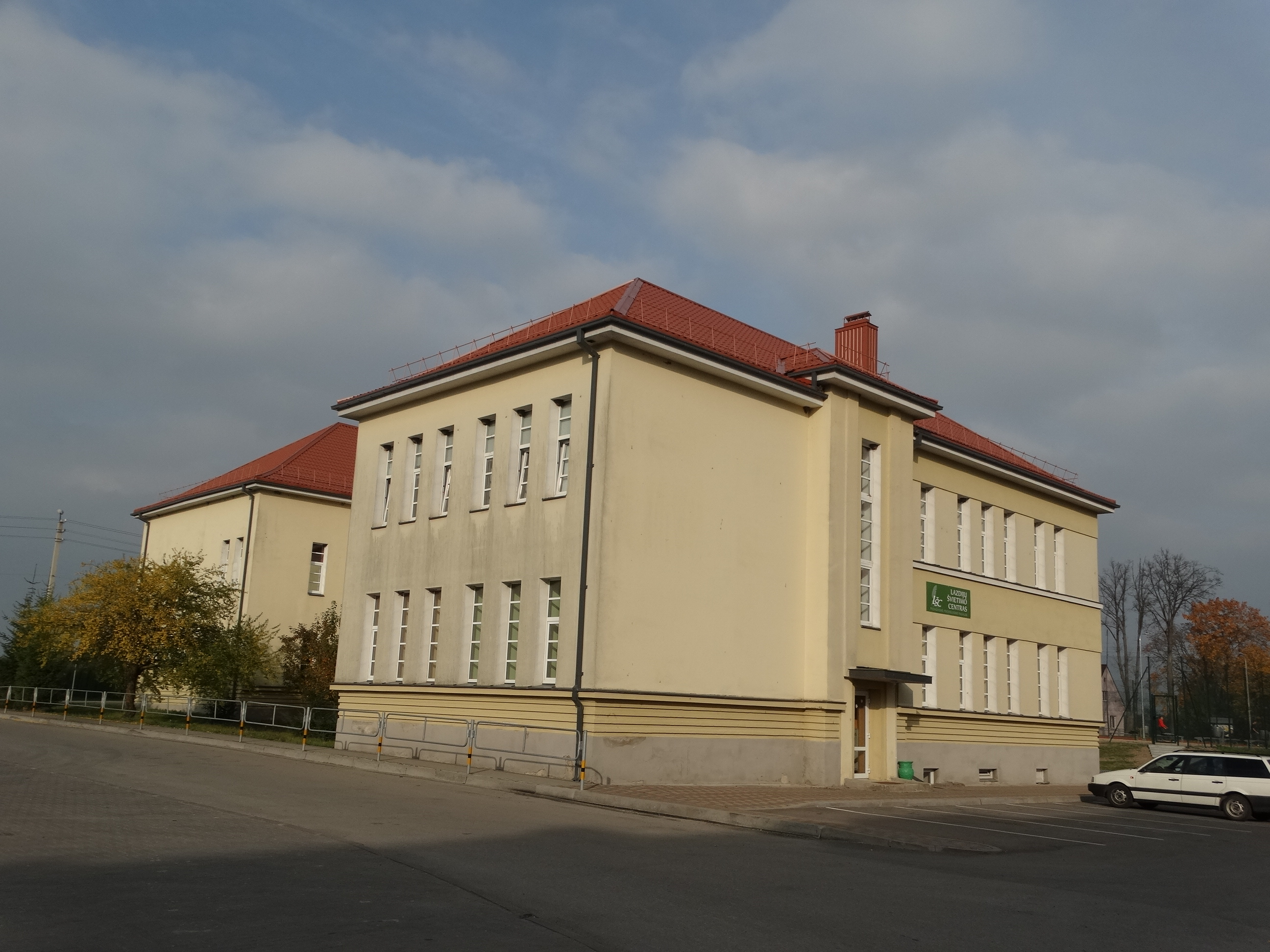
Education Centre

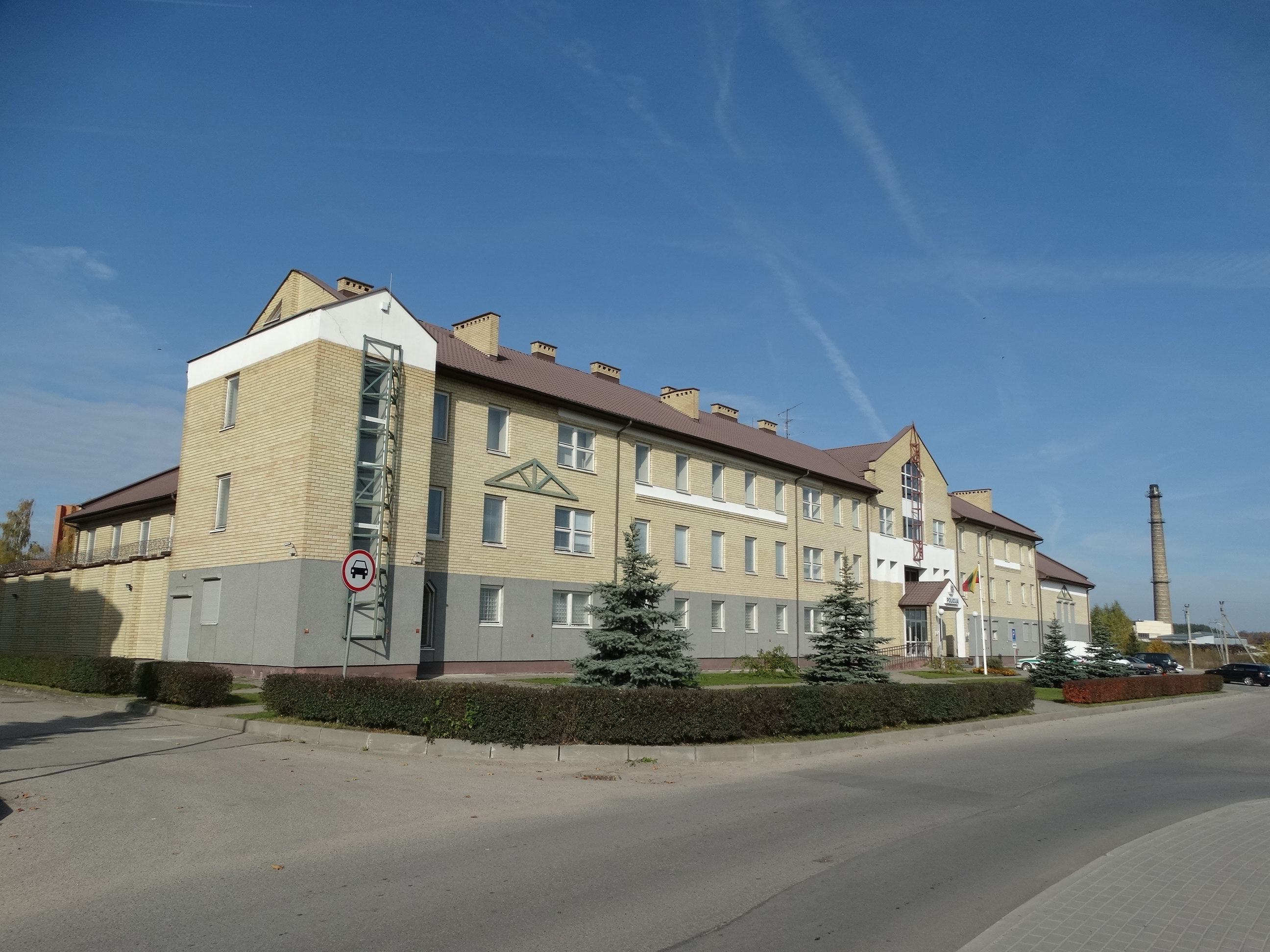
Police station

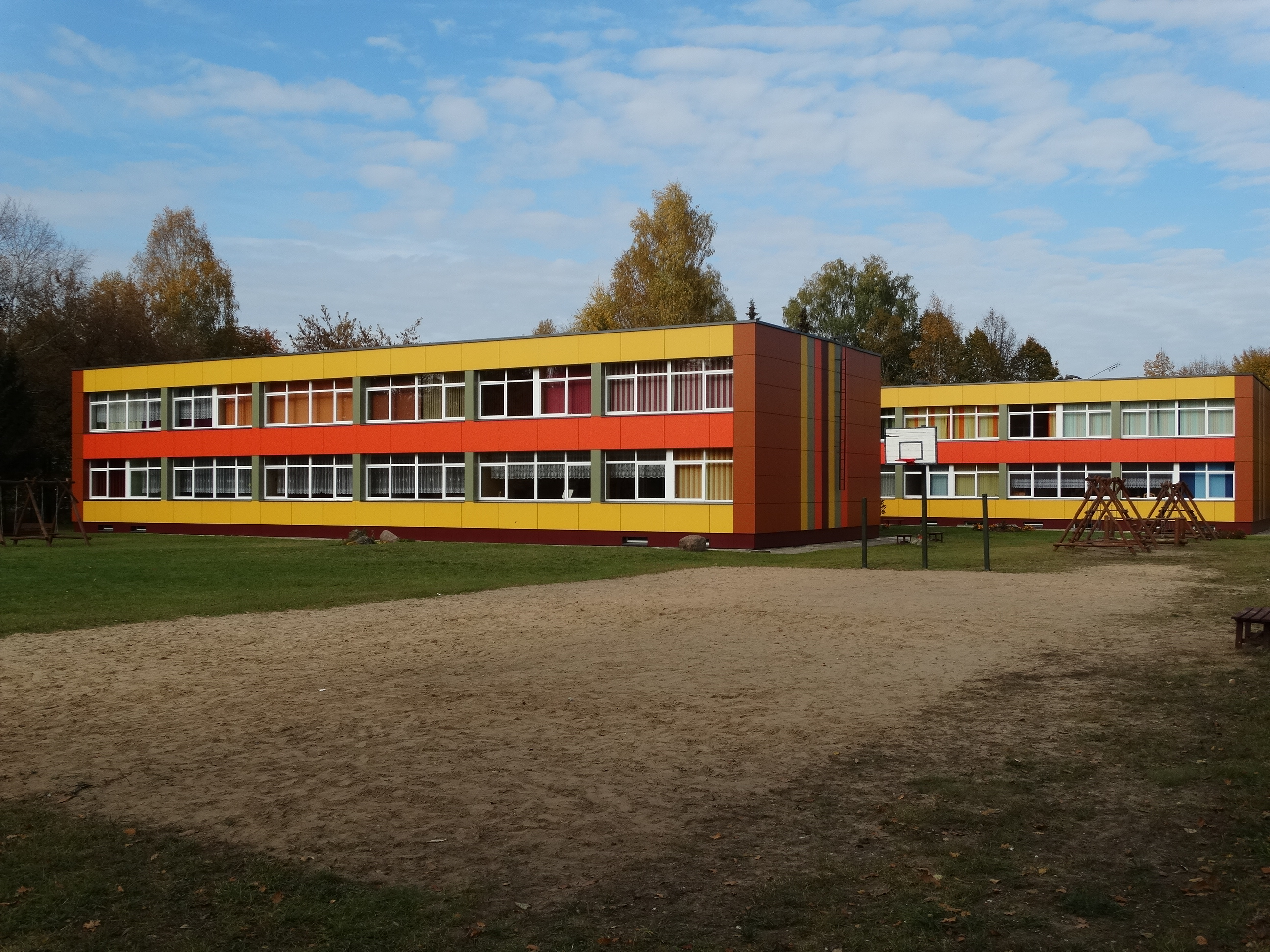
School Vyturėlis
