= Varėnė =

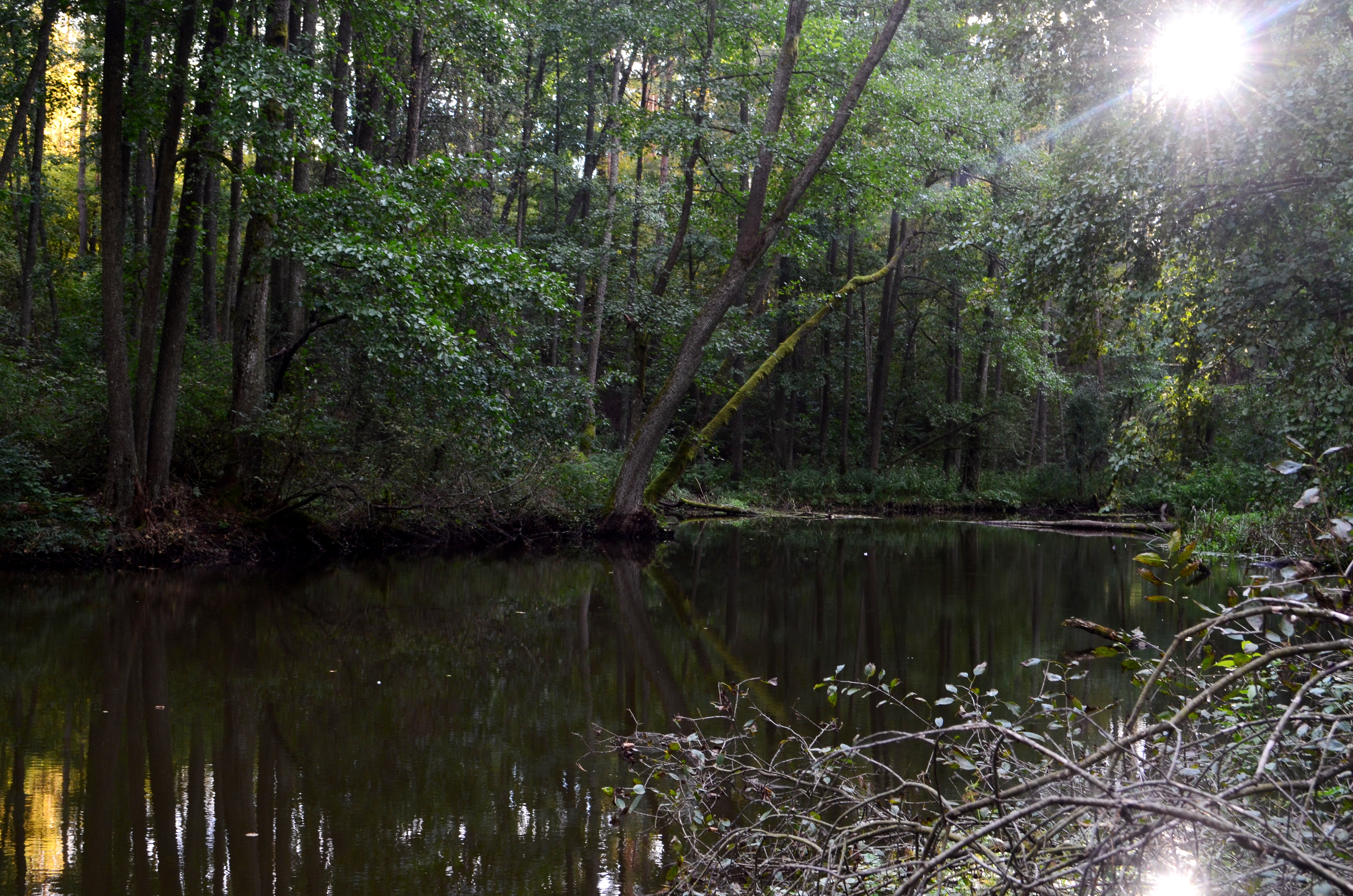
- Varėnė near Glūkas

Location
- Country: Lithuania

Physical characteristics
- Source
  - location: Alytus district municipality, Alytus County
- Mouth: Merkys
  - coordinates: 54.2460°N 24.5536°E
- Length: 48 km (30 mi)
- Basin size: 411 km^{2} (159 sq mi)
- Discharge
  - average: 3.36 m^{3}/s (119 cu ft/s)

Basin features
- Progression: Merkys→ Neman→ Baltic Sea
- Tributaries
  - left: Žiegždupis, Žižma, Dusmena, Musė
  - right: Juodupė, Niedulė, Svetus, Abista

The Varėnė is a river of Alytus district municipality and Varėna district municipality, Alytus County, southern Lithuania. It flows for 48 kilometres and has a basin area of 411 km².

The Varėnė begins near Skaičionys village. There are a lot of water springs along its upper course. Varėnė crosses the Varėnis Lake near its mouth. It joins the Merkys near Varėna city.

Varėnė suits well for water tourism.
