= Abista =

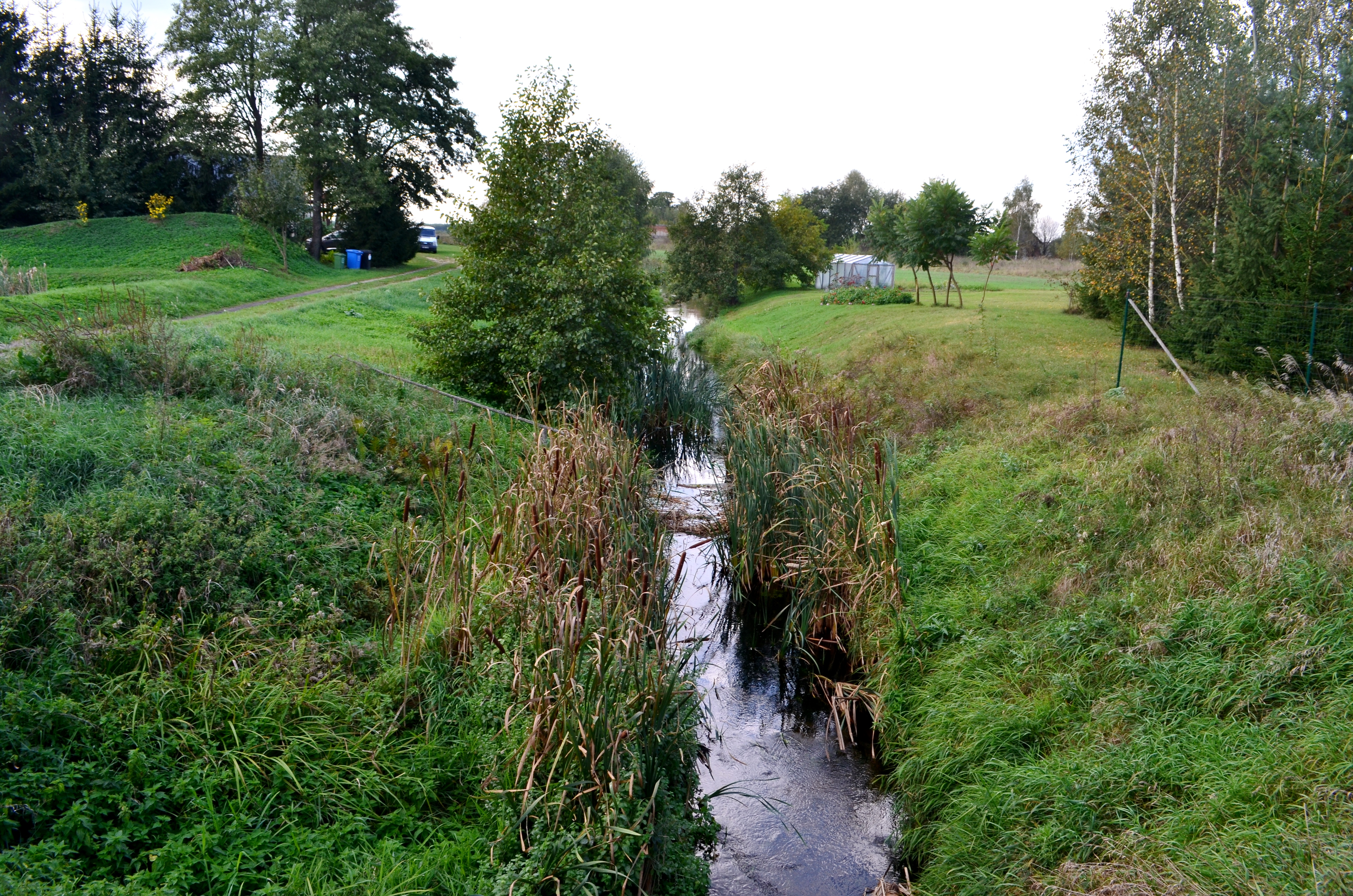

Location
- Country: Lithuania

Physical characteristics
- Source
  - location: Alytus district municipality, Alytus County
- Mouth: Varėnė
  - coordinates: 54°20′22″N 24°30′8″E
- Length: 22 km (14 mi)
- Basin size: 87 km^{2} (34 sq mi)
- Discharge
  - average: 0.63 m^{3}/s (22 cu ft/s)

Basin features
- Progression: Varėnė→ Merkys→ Neman→ Baltic Sea

Abista is a river of Alytus district municipality and Varėna district municipality, Alytus County, southern Lithuania. It flows for 22 kilometres and has a basin area of 87 km².

It is a right tributary of the Varėnė, which flows into the Neman via the Merkys.
