= Glūkas =

- Village
- Location in Lithuania
- Coordinates: 54°17′24″N 24°33′40″E
- Country: Lithuania
- County: Alytus County
- Municipality: Varėna district municipality
- Eldership: Varėna eldership

Population (2001)
  - Total: 4
- Time zone: UTC+2 (EET)
  - Summer (DST): UTC+3 (EEST)

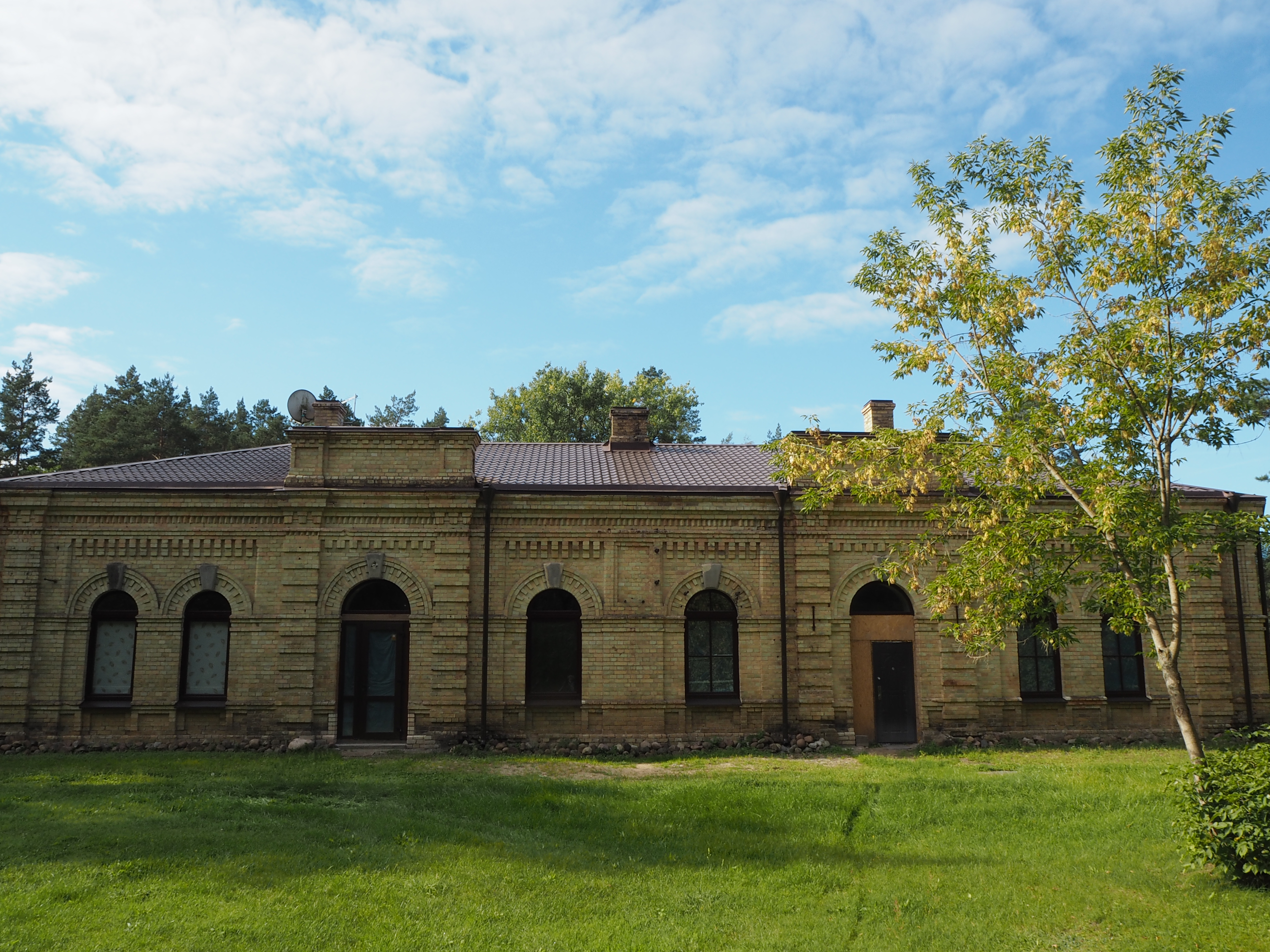
Defunct Glūkas train station

Glūkas is a village in Varėna district municipality, in Alytus County, in southeastern Lithuania. According to the 2001 census, the village has a population of 4 people.
