= Vergakiemis =

Village in Alytus County, Lithuania

- Village
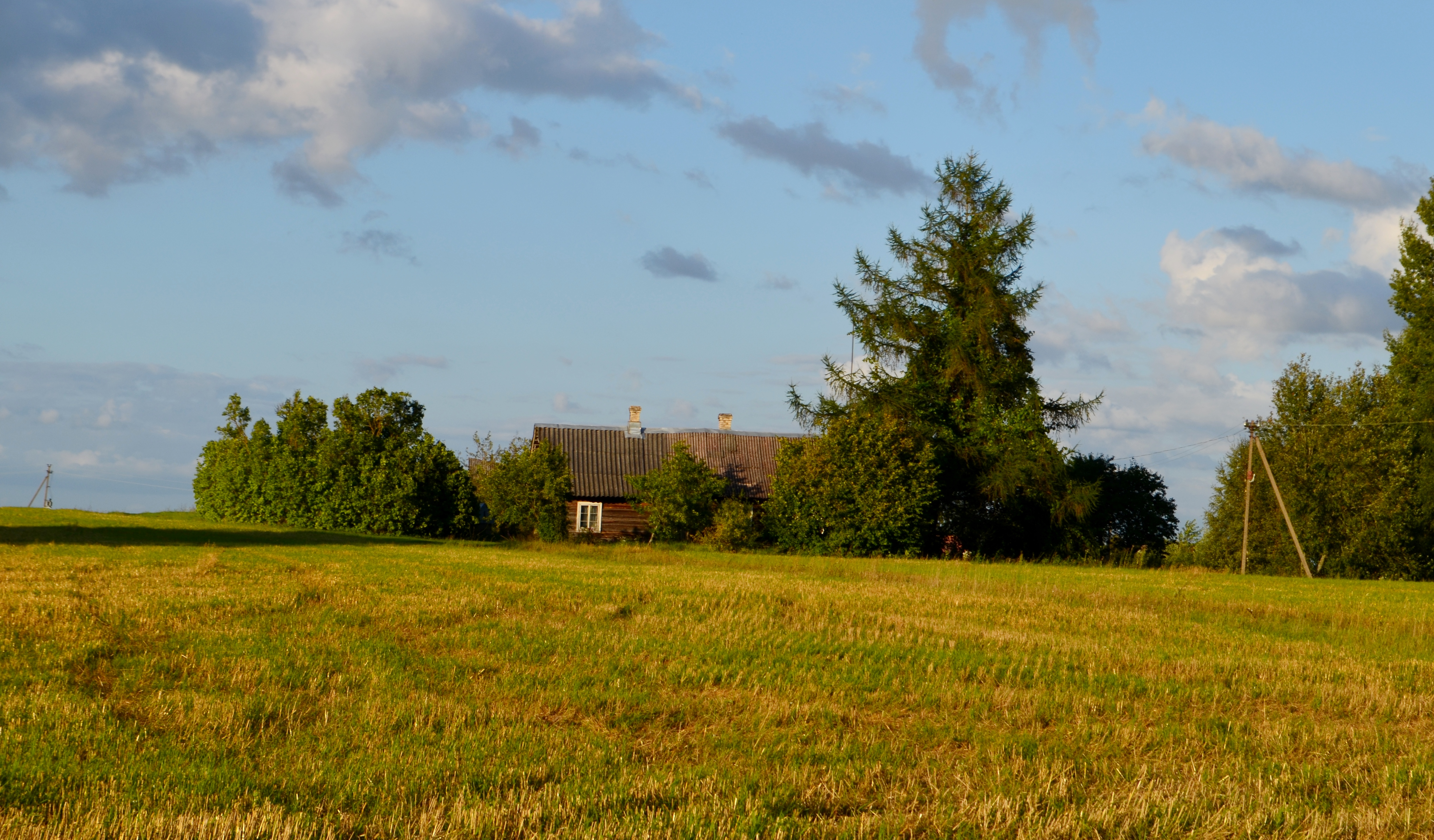

- Location in Varėna District Municipality Vergakiemis (Lithuania)
- Coordinates: 54°22′30″N 24°39′50.4″E
- Country: Lithuania
- County: Alytus County
- Municipality: Varėna District Municipality
- Eldership: Jakėnai Eldership

Population (2011)
  - Total: 34
- Time zone: UTC+2 (EET)
  - Summer (DST): UTC+3 (EEST)
- Postal code: 65416

Vergakiemis is a village in Jakėnai Eldership, Varėna District Municipality, Alytus County, in southeastern Lithuania. As of the 2011 census, the population was 34.

== Geography ==
The village is located in southeastern Lithuania, in the northern part of Varėna District Municipality. The nearest town is Valkininkai, 11.6 kilometres (7.2 mi) away. It lies 18.8 kilometres (11.7 mi) north of the town of Varėna, the seat of the municipality. Vilnius is 53.2 kilometres (33.1 mi) to the northeast. The surrounding landscape is made up of wetland, peat bog and forest, and the village sits between two small lakes, namely, Lake Lielukas to the northeast and Lake Juodikis to the southwest.

== Demographics ==
As of the census of 2011, there were 34 people, of which 52.9% were male and 47.1% female.

As of the census of 2001, there were 41 people, of which 51.2% were male and 48.8% female.

== Transportation ==
The village lies on the national road K4724 (Onuškis–Žilinai–Puodžiai) with links north and south.

== Notable people ==
- Juozas Jermalavičius, the political activist and historian of the Lithuanian Soviet Socialist Republic imprisoned for his role in the January Events of 1991, was born in the village
