= Žilinėliai =

- Village
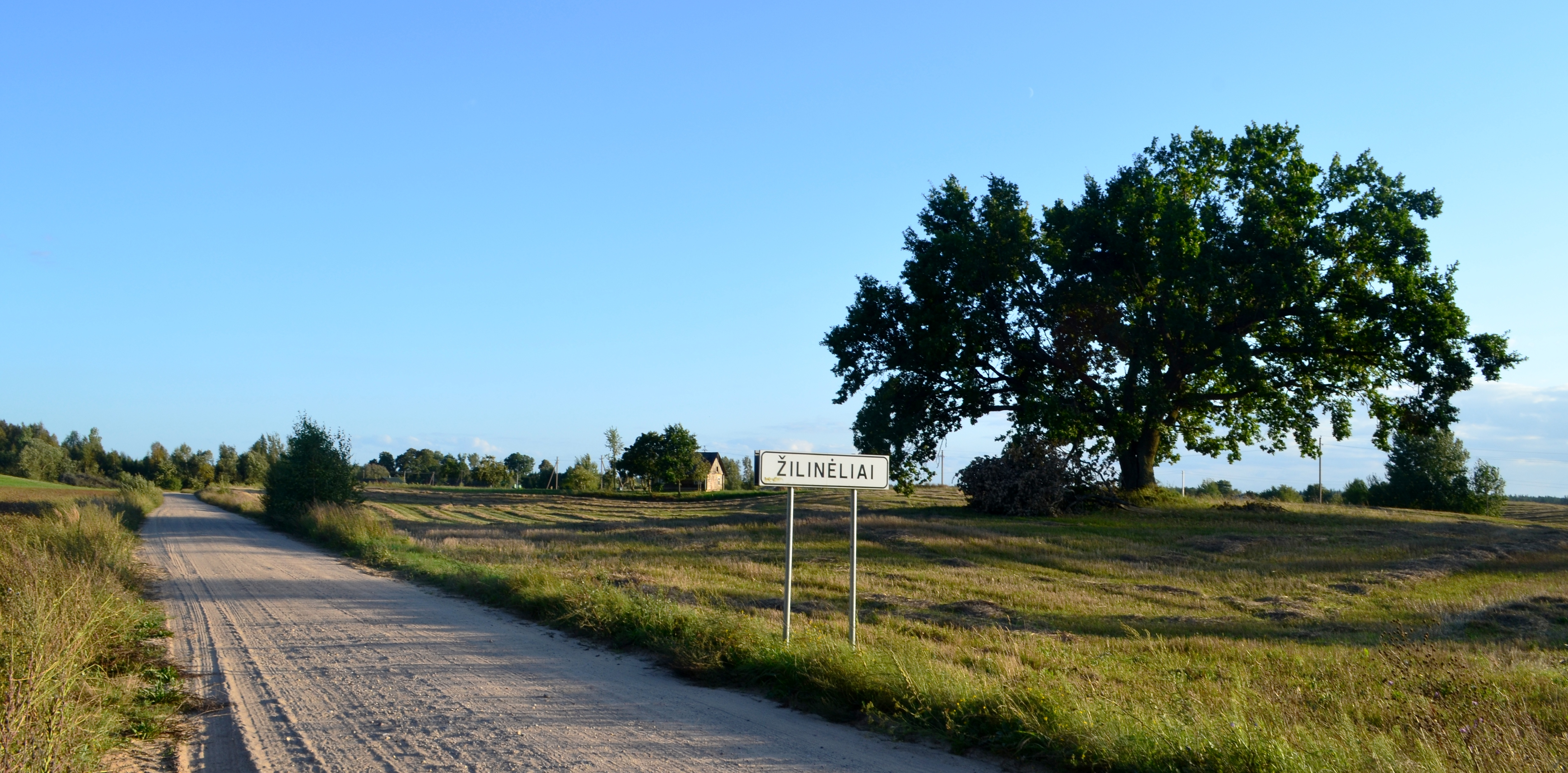

- Location in Varėna District Municipality Žilinėliai (Lithuania)
- Coordinates: 54°20′9.6″N 24°38′31.2″E
- Country: Lithuania
- County: Alytus County
- Municipality: Varėna District Municipality
- Eldership: Jakėnai Eldership

Population (2011)
  - Total: 20
- Time zone: UTC+2 (EET)
  - Summer (DST): UTC+3 (EEST)
- Postal code: 65428

Žilinėliai is a village in Jakėnai Eldership, Varėna District Municipality, Alytus County, in southeastern Lithuania. As of the 2011 census, the population was 20.

== Geography ==
The village is located in southeastern Lithuania, in the northern part of Varėna District Municipality. It lies 14.75 kilometres (9.17 mi) north of the town of Varėna, the seat of the municipality. Vilnius is 56.8 kilometres (35.3 mi) to the northeast. Lake Netečius is 2.6 kilometres (1.6 mi) to the north.

== Demographics ==
As of the census of 2011, there were 20 people, of which 45% were male and 55% female.

As of the census of 2001, there were 37 people, of which 48.6% were male and 51.4% female.

Historical population

| Year | Pop. | ±% |
|---|---|---|
| 1923 | 156 | — |
| 1959 | 186 | +19.2% |
| 1970 | 141 | −24.2% |
| 1979 | 81 | −42.6% |

| Year | Pop. | ±% |
|---|---|---|
| 1987 | 55 | −32.1% |
| 2001 | 37 | −32.7% |
| 2011 | 20 | −45.9% |

Source data

== Transportation ==
The village lies along the A 4 (Vilnius–Varėna–Druskininkai–Grodno) highway, directly linking the settlement to Vilnius and Belarus. National road K 128 (Naujieji Valkininkai–Daugai–Alytus) also runs north of the village.
