= Battle of Valkininkai =

Battle of Valkininkai may refer to:

- Battle of Valkininkai (1700), a battle of the Lithuanian Civil War (1697-1702) between the Sapieha and a coalition of noblemen opposed to them.
- Battle of Valkininkai (1706), a battle of the Great Northern War between Sweden and the alliance of Polish–Lithuanian Commonwealth and Tsardom of Russia.
