= Valkininkai Eldership =

Valkininkai Eldership Valkininkų seniūnija
- Eldership
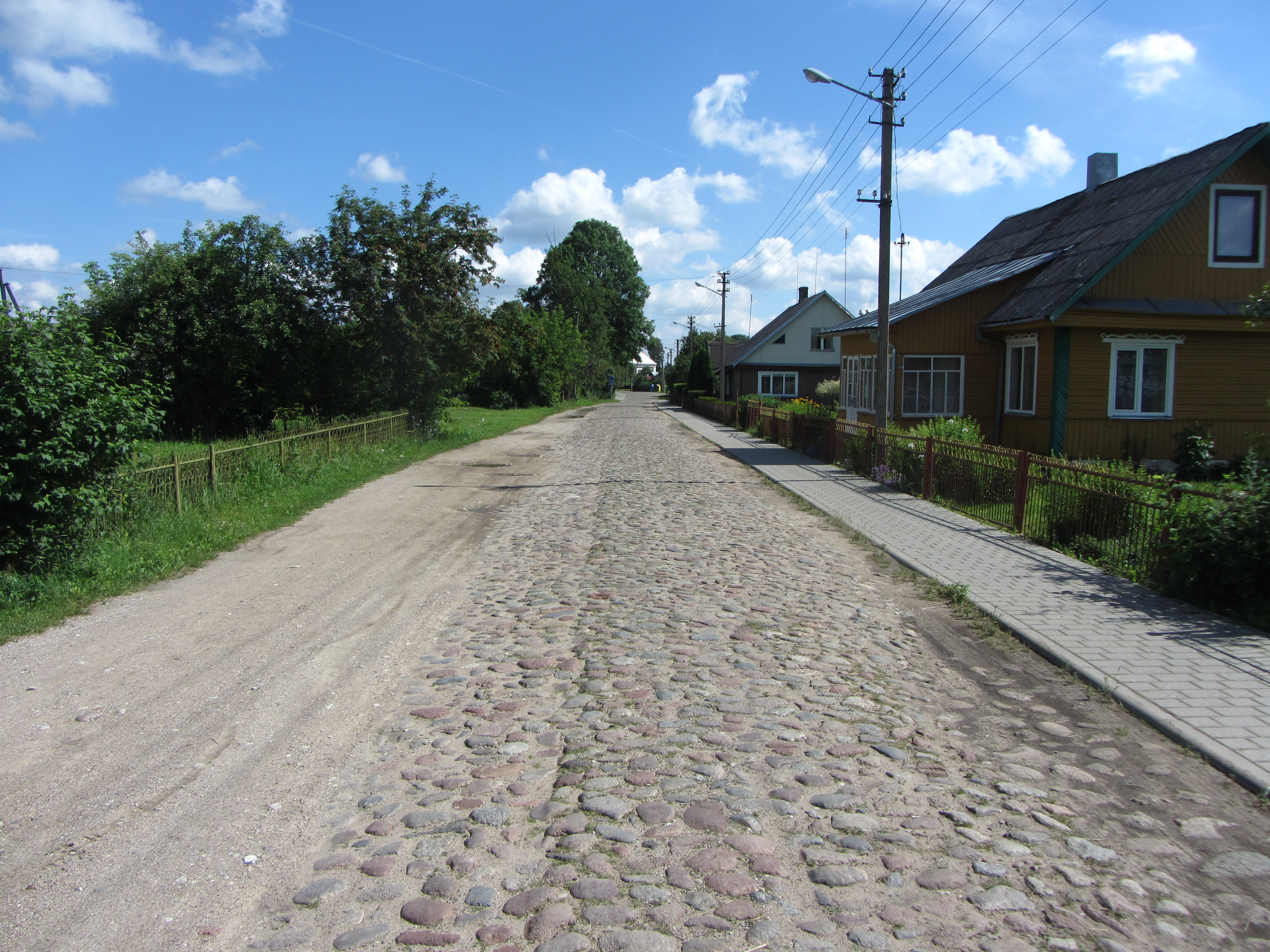
- Valkininkai

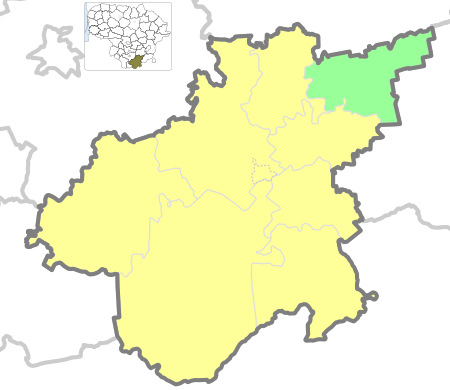
- Location of Valkininkai Eldership
- Country: Lithuania
- Ethnographic region: Dzūkija
- County: Alytus County
- Municipality: Varėna District Municipality
- Administrative centre: Valkininkai

Area
  - Total: 156 km^{2} (60 sq mi)

Population (2021)
  - Total: 1,572
  - Density: 10.1/km^{2} (26.1/sq mi)
- Time zone: UTC+2 (EET)
  - Summer (DST): UTC+3 (EEST)

Valkininkai Eldership (Lithuanian: Valkininkų seniūnija) is a Lithuanian eldership, located in the northern part of Varėna District Municipality.
