= Degsnės =

- Village
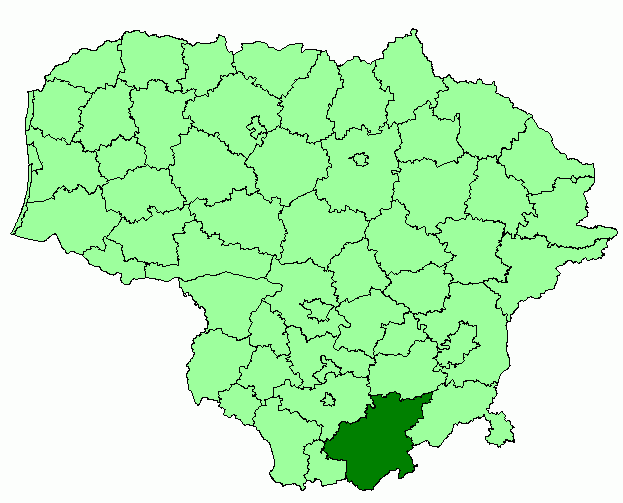
- Location in Varėna district municipality Location of Varėna district in Lithuania
- Coordinates: 54°22′N 24°48′E
- Country: Lithuania
- County: Alytus
- Municipality: Varėna
- Eldership: Valkininkų (Valkininkai)

Population (2011 Census)
  - Total: 66
- Time zone: UTC+2 (EET)
  - Summer (DST): UTC+3 (EEST)

Degsnės is a village in Valkininkų (Valkininkai) eldership, Varėna district municipality, Alytus County, southeastern Lithuania. It is located 3 kilometres (2 mi) northwest of Valkininkai. According to the 2001 census, the village had a population of 68 people. At the 2011 census, the population was 66.
