= Ruzhany Palace =

Former palace in Ruzhany, Belarus

Coordinates: 52.860°N 24.896°E

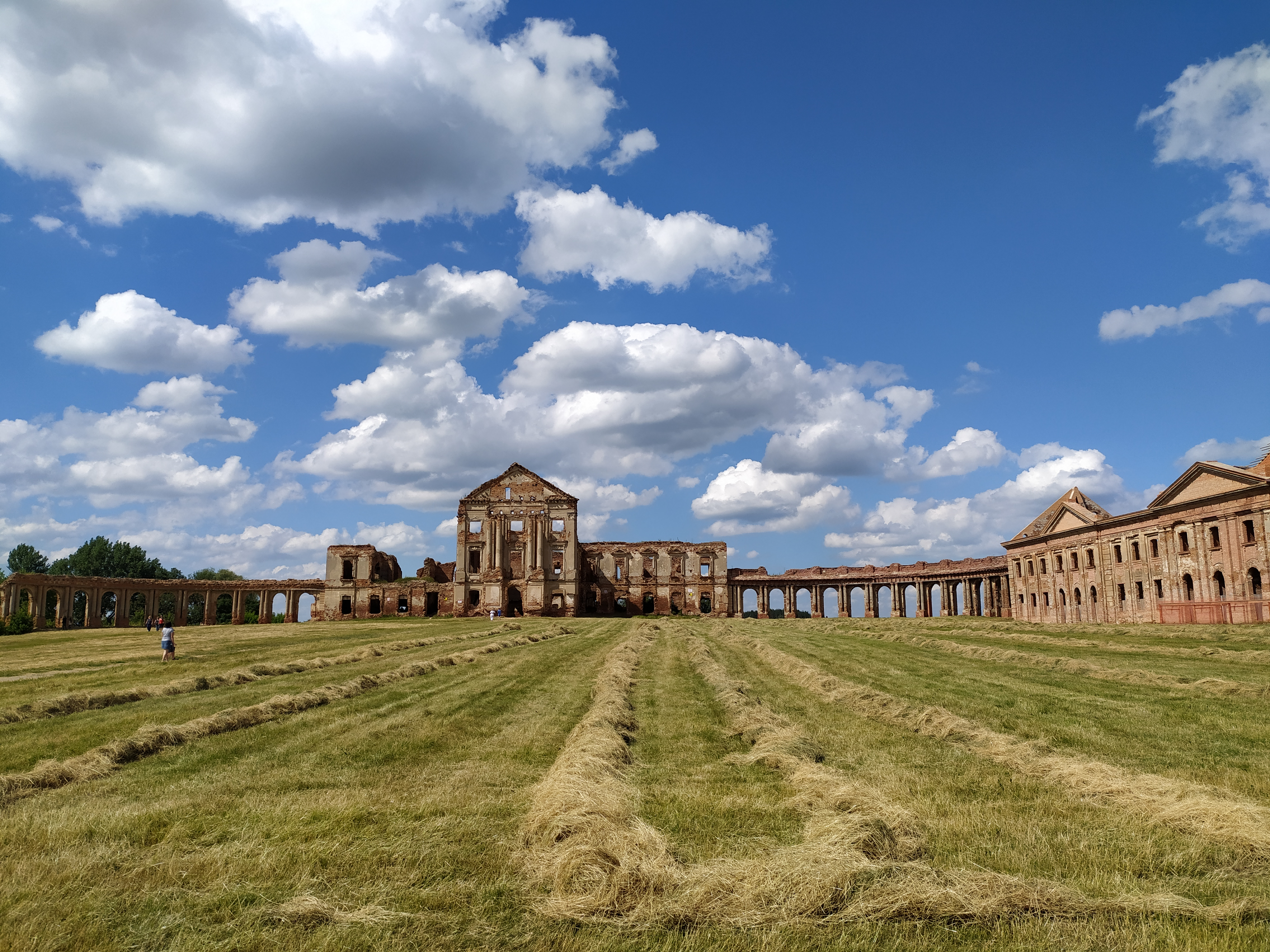
The ruins of the Ruzhany Palace in 2020

Ruzhany Palace (Belarusian: палац у Ружанах, Polish: Pałac w Różanie) is a ruined palace compound in Ruzhany village, Pruzhany District, Brest Region, Western Belarus. Between the 16th and 19th centuries Ruzhany, then called Różany, was the main seat of the senior line of the Sapieha noble family, known as the Sapiehas of Ruzhany. The castle is currently undergoing systematic reconstruction, with the palace ornate gate and entry building being already restored.

== History ==
Design of the palace
Rear side of the palace	Front side of the palace	Design of the gates and buildings

Ruzhany began its life in the late 16th century as the site of Lew Sapieha's castle, the palace being completed in 1602. The Sapieha residence was destroyed in the course of the internecine strife in the Grand Duchy of Lithuania when it was attacked by Michał Serwacy Wiśniowiecki's forces in 1700.

Ruzhany Palace was rebuilt as a grand Neoclassical residence in the 1770s by Aleksander Michał Sapieha, employing the services of the architect Jan Samuel Becker of Saxony, who set the palace in an English park landscape. Aside from the palace, there was a theatre (1784–88), an orangery and several other outbuildings. Becker also designed the local church (rebuilt in the 1850s).

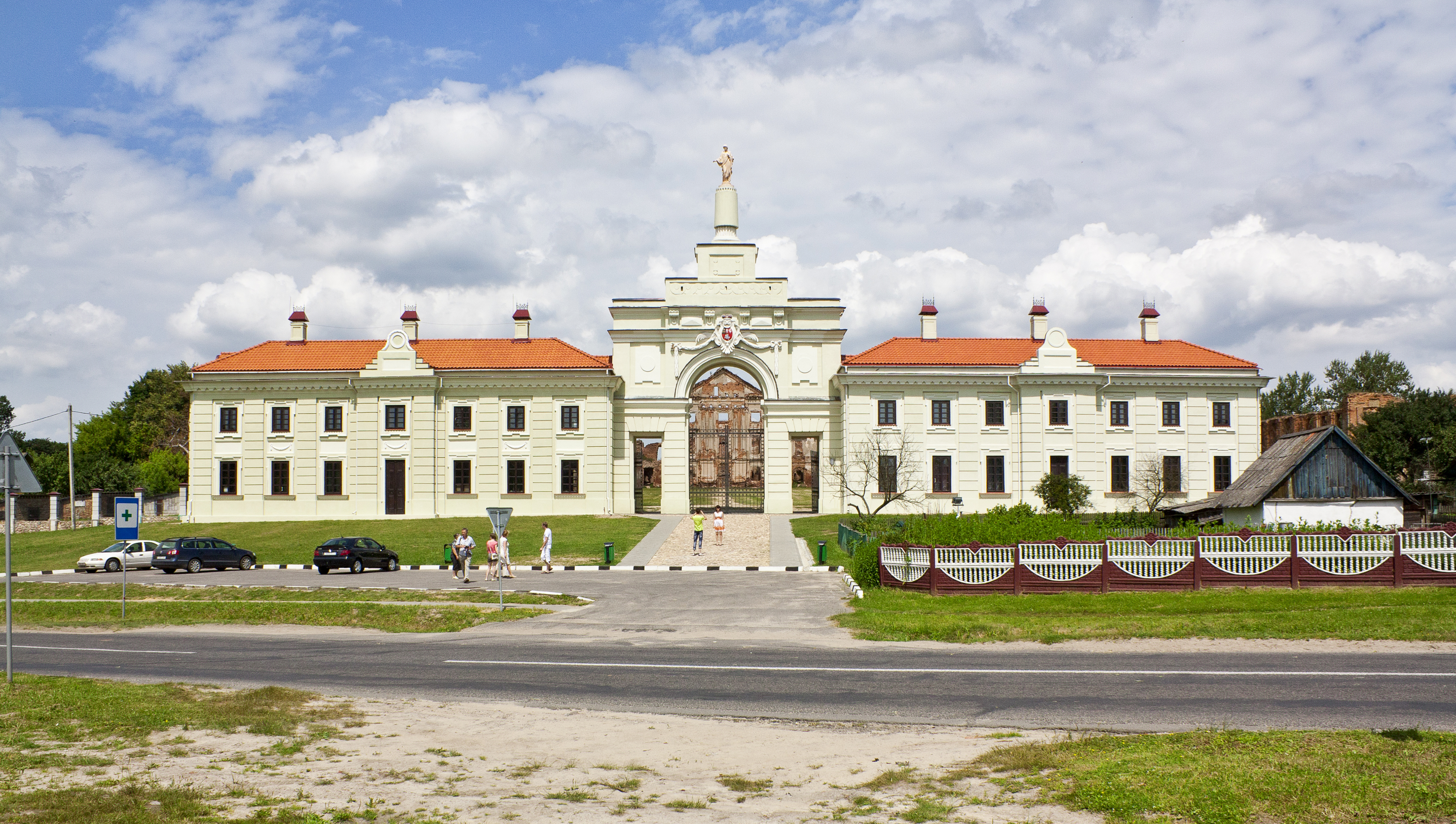
The reconstructed palace gate in 2012

By the time of King Stanisław II's visit in 1784, work on the palace had been suspended. The Sapieha estates were nationalised in the aftermath of the November Uprising (1831). Three years later, the palace compound was sold to be used as a textile mill and weaving factory.

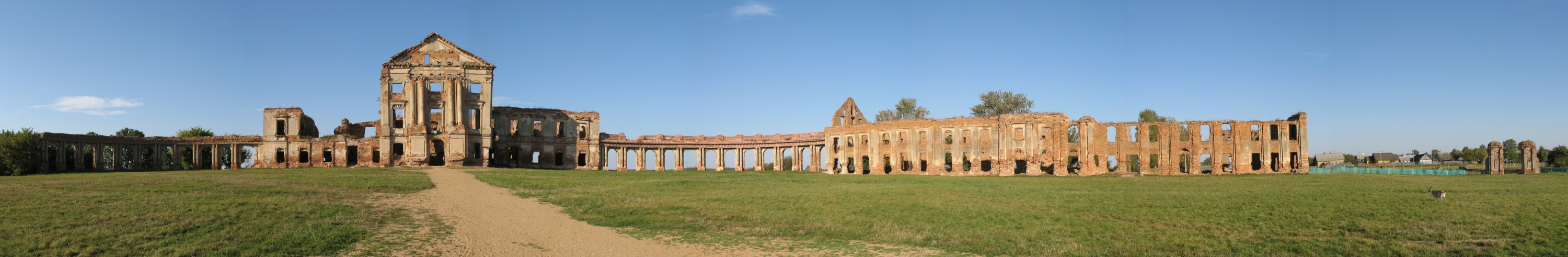
The ruins of the Ruzhany Palace and theatre in 2007

In 1914 the palace was accidentally set on fire by factory workers. The First World War and subsequent financial hardships prevented the building's restoration until 1930, however the partially restored palace became a ruin again within fifteen years, a casualty of the Second World War. The ornate palace gate survives and has recently been restored.

== See also ==
- Biaroza monastery, a family vault of the Sapieha family not far from Ruzhany
- Halshany Castle, another ruined Sapieha residence in Belarus
- List of castles in Belarus
