= Lithuanian Civil War (1697–1702) =

Civil war in Grand Duchy of Lithuania from 1697 to 1702

- Part of Great Northern War
Date	1697–1702
Location	Grand Duchy of Lithuania, Polish-Lithuanian Commonwealth
Result	Victory of the Lithuanian nobility against the Sapieha family

Belligerents
Anti-Sapieha Coalition Supported by: John III Sobieski August II the Strong	Sapieha family and allies

The Lithuanian Civil War of 1697–1702 refers to the conflict between the powerful Sapieha family, which dominated the internal affairs of the Grand Duchy of Lithuania, and the anti-Sapieha coalition, so-called Republicans or Confederates. The latter were composed of opposing noble families (Radziwiłł, Wiśniowiecki, Pac and Ogiński) that disliked Sapieha family's hegemony in the country. The szlachta was mostly on the side of the Republicans as they were angry at Sapieha's abuse and the taxes imposed on them to finance the Grand Ducal Lithuanian Army, which was mostly loyal to the Sapiehas.

== Background ==
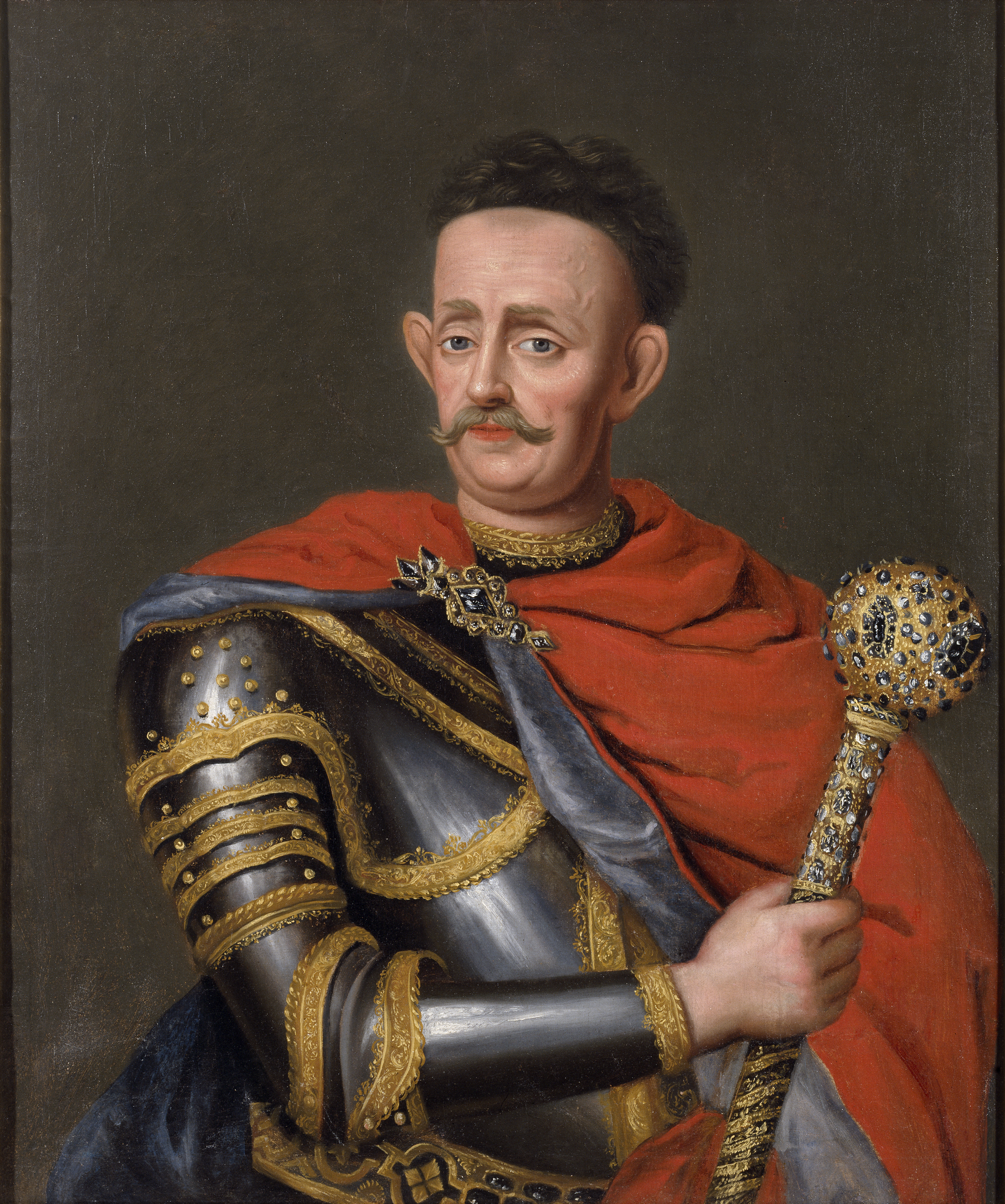
Lithuanian Grand Hetman Kazimierz Jan Sapieha

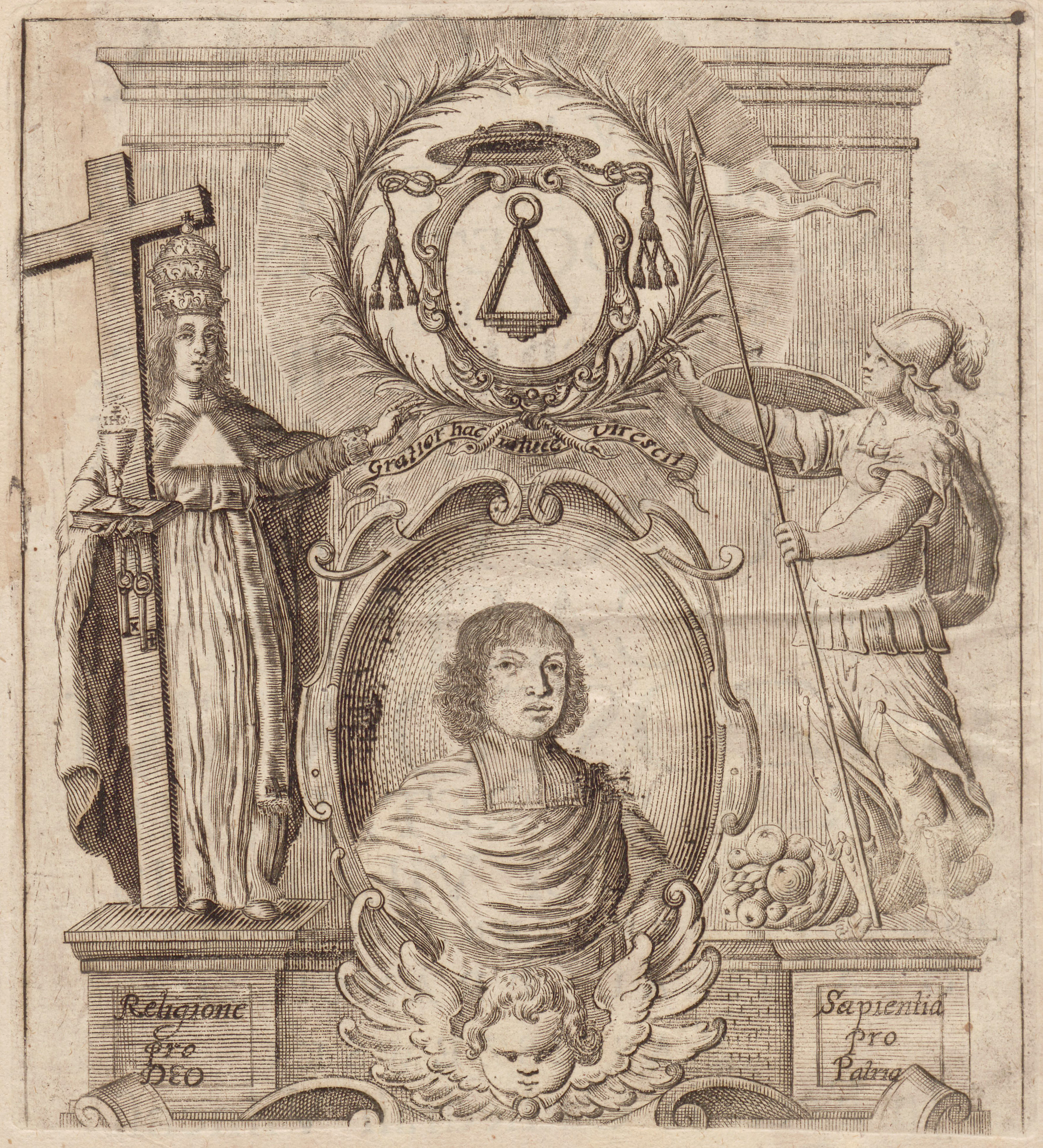
Bishop of Vilnius Konstanty Kazimierz Brzostowski

In the Grand Duchy, the influence of the magnates was much stronger than in the Crown of the Kingdom of Poland. The struggle for power was won by one of the families, which seized the most important offices and exercised a leading role within the Grand Duchy. During the reign of King Michał Korybut Wiśniowiecki from late 1669 to 1673, the Pac family won the dominant role after ousting the Radziwiłłs. Also during this period, the hetmans' role increased. After a period of unending wars, the Lithuanian army remained under arms and the magnates controlling it used it for their own political interests, for example, it became customary to pick the estates of the current hetman's political opponents as the military quarters. The power of hetmans in Lithuania was due to the differences in the ruling system compared to the Crown, where the hetmans' position was weaker. The royal court sought to equalize rights between the Polish–Lithuanian Commonwealth's both parts, which practically meant introducing Poland's legal customs into Lithuania and challenging the magnates' position.

King John III Sobieski, wanting to weaken the position of the Pacs, elevated the Sapieha family to the highest dignities, but made the mistake of endowing the brothers Kazimierz Jan and Benedykt Paweł Sapieha with the most important positions of Grand Hetman and Podskarbi, respectively. Thus the Sapieha family controlled the Lithuanian army and treasury. Another reason for Sobieski granting them their positions was because the Sapiehas had supported his candidature for King in 1674, so he aided Sapiehas in their competition with the Pacs. With the deaths of the Lithuanian Grand Hetman Michał Kazimierz Pac in 1682 and then the Chancellor of Lithuania Krzysztof Zygmunt Pac in 1684, the domination by the Pac family ended. Nevertheless, when the Sapieha's took over the dominant position from the Pacs, they continued many of the Pacs former political propositions and even switched their support from the pro-France to the pro-Habsburg position in the Commonwealth's foreign affairs, which was a source of conflict between the Sapiehas and the king himself.

During the period of Sapiehas' domination from 1683 to 1700, the Commonwealth was at war, first in the Great Turkish War (1683–1699) and then the Great Northern War which started in 1700, both of which meant that a relatively large army had to be continuously maintained, which was a linchpin for Sapieha's political domination in Lithuania. Due to their wide-ranging power, the Sapieha family practically controlled the sejmiks (regional parliaments). They soon moved into open anti-royal opposition in the mid of 1680s. In addition to the offices held, the basis of the Sapiehas' power were their vast estates. Kazimierz Jan was one of the richest magnates in Lithuania, in 1690 he owned about 18,000 chimneys, moreover, he controlled the huge estate left by the late Ludwika Karolina Radziwiłł (the so-called Neuburg estate, about 14,000 chimneys). His younger brother Benedykt Paweł owned 9,000 chimneys. The total Sapieha fortune amounted to about 30 thousand chimneys, which accounted for 10% of all estates in Lithuania (with the Neuburg estate about 15%). The other magnate families were much less wealthy, only the Radziwiłłs could compare with the Sapiehas family, as they had about 20,000 chimneys, of which, however, only 12,000 in Lithuania, and the richest of them, Karol Stanisław Radziwiłł, owned about 7,500 chimneys. Other magnate families owned much smaller estates (from 1 to 3 thousand chimneys).

Matrimonial policy was also important. And especially relationships with powerful Crown families: Lubomirski, Wielopolski, Branicki and Opaliński families. Equally important was the marriage of the Great Hetman's son, Aleksander Paweł Sapieha, to Maria de Bethun, who was the niece of Queen Marie Casimire and the sister of the wife of the Great Crown Hetman's son, Stanisław Jan Jabłonowski.

Sobieski made another attempt to build his own party in Lithuania, this time relying on the smaller magnate families, the Słuszko, Ogiński and Kryszpin-Kirszensztein. Hence, an anti-Sapieha coalition formed among a group of magnates that did not want Sapieha's influence to remain unchecked. They allied themselves with the King John III Sobieski, and tried to hamper Sapieha's influence. However, the Sapiehas pursued a policy that was popular among the nobility, accusing the king of trying to restrict the freedoms of the nobility and pursuing dynastic politics. The Sapiehas, by breaking off the Sejms, prevented the adoption of taxes for the ongoing war with Turkey; the breaking off of the Sejm in Grodno (December 31, 1692 - February 11, 1693) marked the beginning of open conflict. Yet no one dared to openly challenge the Sapieha family, except for the Bishop of Vilnius Konstanty Kazimierz Brzostowski, who was close to the policies of the royal court and in particular to queen consort Marie Casimire.

== Prelude ==
=== Confrontation between Brzostowski and Sapieha (1693–1696) ===
In the winter of 1693, the Grand Hetman of Lithuania Kazimierz Jan Sapieha quartered the Lithuanian army in the bishop's manors, although the army was only allowed to station in state estates and was forbidden in church estates. So, the bishop Konstanty Kazimierz Brzostowski initiated a legal case against Sapieha. The case continued for a long time, and two Sejms in the timespan between 1693 and 1695 broke up because of it. Unable to resolve his case with the Grand Hetman either in the Sejm or in the Lithuanian Tribunal and after receiving a letter of protection against Sapieha, the bishop of Vilnius resorted to extreme measures. So, on 18 April 1694, the bishop excommunicated Sapieha in the Vilnius Cathedral, forbidding him to enter churches and receive sacraments.

The excommunication had great propaganda value for the Republicans, as well as encouraging them to become more active and organized. The Republicans main slogan was the equalization of the legal norms of Poland and Lithuania, which would have affected precisely the main offices in Sapiehas hands. Despite the excommunication, the Lithuanian army remained loyal to its hetman. The same evening that he was excommunicated, nobles of Vilnius and their ladies still gathered at Sapieha Palace in Antakalnis. Since almost all the monasteries in Vilnius lived off of Sapieha's donations, they did not adhere to the bishop's excommunication as they did not want to upset their main donor. Sapieha, who was never pious, went deliberately to the monastery churches to hear Mass. After Brzostowski confronted the monks, they answered that they could ignore his excommunication as their only chiefs were the superiors general of their religious orders.

Confusion ensued with the whole country being agitated and both sides publishing many pamphlets. The Sapieha's did not follow the bishops and his clergy, and the rowdy local nobility in the sejmiks was controlled by the army. Even Michał Stefan Radziejowski, the Primate of Poland, sent a letter of rebuke to Brzostowski and annulled the excommunication of Sapieha due to political reasons, yet the Pope's nuncio supported the bishop and took Sapieha to a trial in the Warsaw's nunciature.

In 1694, Sapieha marched with his army against the Ottoman army and halted in Dubienka. Once there, his troops sent delegates to the king, declaring their loyalty to Sapieha and demanding that the king pay them appropriate salaries. On 6 October 1694, at the Battle of Ustechko, Sapieha together with Grand Crown Hetman Stanisław Jan Jabłonowski led the Polish-Lithuanian forces to victory against the Ottoman army. After the battle, Jabłonowski sent a letter to Pope Innocent XI commending Sapieha. So, Brzostowski had to leave Rome without gaining anything and his excommunication was forgotten. Kazimierz Sapieha was greeted as a victor when he returned to Vilnius. While Sapieha was away, the Lithuanian nobility split into those supporting Sapieha and the anti-Sapieha coalition.

The dispute over quartering was only the surface-level explanation for the confrontation between Kazimierz Jan Sapieha and the bishop, which was actually a deeper conflict between the Sapiehas and the king Sobieski. The bishop Brzostowski was an ardent supporter of the king and his pro-France policy, as well as of a separate peace with the Ottoman Empire, so that Poland-Lithuania would no longer be involved in the Great Turkish War. In return, the king hoped that the dispute between the hetman and the bishop would lead to the curtailment of the Grand Hetman's powers.

After the death of king Sobieski in 1696, the Pope began to mediate the conflict between the Bishop of Vilnius and the Grand Hetman. On 6 October 1696, Sapieha and the papal nuncion signed an agreement in Warsaw, which was soon approved by the Pope. Thus, Sapieha's excommunication was revoked and he was found innocent, while the bishop of Vilnius was forbidden to excommunicate Lithuanian ministers in the future without the Pope's prior approval.

=== Neuburg affair ===
Before the conclusion of Brzostowski's and Sapieha's confrontation, the Sapiehas sought to take over the lands in the Grand Duchy of Lithuania which belonged to the last representative of the Radziwiłł family's Biržai line, Ludwika Karolina Radziwiłł, and her second husband, the Duke of Neuburg, Charles III Philip. An agreement regarding these so-called Neuburg holdings became especially important after her death in 1695. Radziwiłł and the Duke of Neuburg were represented by Habsburg diplomats, because Charles III Philip was the Holy Roman Empress Eleonore Magdalene of Neuburg's brother. On 2 May 1697 in Königsberg, an agreement was signed whereby Sapieha recognized and bought the Hohenzollern pretensions of 590,000 ducats for 50,000 ducats. On June 30, immediately after the election of Augustus II the Strong as king of Poland, an agreement entrusting Kazimierz Sapieha with the Neuburg holdings was signed in Warsaw with the mediation of the Holy Roman Emperor's ambassador. On 3 November 1699, the contract which regulated Sapieha's rights as guardians of Radziwiłł's only daughter Elisabeth August and the Neuburg estates, was signed, and was later approved by the new king Augustus II. Then, on 24 June 1700, a preliminary contract for the giving over of these holdings to Sapieha for the sum of 650,000 Dutch guilders was signed.

By 1700, the hopes of the Sapiehas to take over the Neuburg holdings seemed very real. The threat of the Sapiehas controlling a fifth of all the lands in the Grand Duchy of Lithuania emboldened their enemies to act militarily. The Republicans successfully dashed the Sapiehas aspirations by defeating them in the battle of Valkininkai later that year. In the decision of Valkininkai on 24 November 1700, the Neuburg holdings were entrusted to Chancellor Karol Stanisław Radziwiłł. Finally, on 18 July 1701, the Duke Charles III Philip published his manifesto stating that the Sapiehas had not paid him the agreed 650,000 guilders by the date stipulated in the contract, therefore their previous agreement on the sale of the Neuburg holdings lost its validity.

== Civil war ==
=== Brest Confederation (1697) ===
With Sobieski's death, political strife turned into military conflict, as the anti-Sapieha coalition in Samogitia and eastern Lithuania began to openly challenge Sapieha. In October 1696, Sapieha's enemies formed the Brest Confederation. Elder of Samogitia Grzegorz Ogiński, Castellan of Vitebsk Michał Kociełł, Lithuanian Great Guard Ludwik Pociej, the Standard-bearer of Samogitia Kazimierz Horbowski and the Kryszpins, Jerzy Kryszpin and Andrzej Kryszpin, managed to influence part of the Lithuanian army to form a confederation, and together they started pillaging Sapieha estates. Eventually, the Confederation army, led by Grzegorz Ogiński, was besieged in Brest by Kazimierz Jan Sapieha and forced to capitulate on November 26, 1696.

The declared aims of the anti-Sapieha coalition was the Coaequatio iurium (lit. 'equalization of rights') equalized the rights of Lithuania and Poland, a goal which they attained in the royal sejm of 1697. This equalization wanted to limit the powers of Lithuanian ministers, first and foremost those of the Grand Hetman and the Grand Treasurer, positions held respectively by Kazimierz Jan Sapieha and Benedykt Paweł Sapieha.

=== Royal election of 1697 ===
In the 1697 Polish–Lithuanian royal election, the Sapiehas supported François Louis, Prince of Conti for the Polish-Lithuanian throne while most of the Lithuanian nobility and the Ogiński family supported Augustus II the Strong. Once Augustus II won the election, Sapieha went over to the king's side, who issued a universal, that ordained Ogiński and his supporters to cease their activities, regardless, the cruel civil war went on in 1698.

Furthermore, the Coaequatio iurium was passed during the Election sejm of 1697 without opposition because the Sapiehas and their loyalists boycotted the election. This law curtailed the powers of Lithuanian ministers, specifically those of the Hetmans and the Treasurers. This law specifically targeted the Sapieha family. The Grand Chancellor of Lithuania, Karol Stanisław Radziwiłł, allowed the equalization to go through, even at the cost of his own position.

Among the changes passed in the sejm of 1697 was the introduction of the Polish language as the sole official language in Lithuanian documents. More precisely, the Lithuanian nobility's self-government courts, which included the land courts at the level of powiats (Lithuanian: pavietas) and voivodeship, as well as the Lithuanian Tribunal, had to switch from writing in the Ruthenian language to Polish. Sapieha disregarded the equalization, thus giving his enemies an opportunity to accuse him even more of self-will. While the Grand Hetman controlled the Lithuanian army, he managed to curb the violent activity of noble bands.

On 22 February 1698, a confederation of the Grand Ducal Lithuanian Army and nobility was formed in Skuodas to combat the Sapiehas. The confederation counted between 2,000-4,000 people. At the time, Republican forces consisted of the regular Lithuanian Army banners that obeyed Grzegorz Ogiński, in addition to irregular forces of nobles who supported Ogiński's cause. In the name of the whole Lithuanian Army, the confederates demanded that the government only pay the arrears of four quarters and waiving any claims to the government's officially declared 48 quarters in debt to the army. The Sapiehas disapproved of such demands, and thus the conflict escalated. There were several cases where confederates encountered Sapieha's troops, although losses for both sides were minimal, for example, near Raseiniai, Kaunas and elsewhere. In Žiežmariai, after being surprised by Sapieha's troops, most of the regular army units that had joined the confederacy accepted Kazimierz Jan Sapieha's control on April 30. However, near Jurbarkas, the szlachta assembled by Grzegorz Ogiński were defeated in battle by Jerzy Sapieha on July 22. After this defeat, Ogiński fled to Prussia. The Sapiehas viewed Ogiński as a rebel against whom military force could be used and the military personnel who followed Ogiński as soldiers who had disobeyed their superiors and thus needing to be executed. Nevertheless, the Lithuanian Army loyal to the Sapiehas avoided using brute force against the local nobility that had organized banner of pospolite ruszenie. This allowed the Republicans to take control of the Lithuanian Tribunal in 1698, which created the position of the Lithuanian Regimentarz (Lithuanian: Generalinis Pulkininkas, lit. 'General Colonel'), responsible for assembling the banners of pospolite ruszenie. The Castellan of Vitebsk, Michał Kociełł, was elected as Regimentarz and thus became the formal political leader of the Republicans.

In autumn 1698, as the Grand Hetman Sapieha was in Podolia at the head of the Lithuanian Army, the Republicans mobilized their supporters among the local nobles and marched out to meet the returning army, and fighting was only avoided by the intervention of King Augustus II. On December 21 the Treaty of Puzewicze was signed between the king and Lithuanian nobility, stating that the Lithuanian army's size was to be slashed by more than half and that the position of Regimentarz had wide responsibilities in government finances and in supervising the payment of the army's wages in an attempt to subvert the Sapiehas. The anti-Sapiehan nobles were not satisfied and immediately created a resolution that was even more anti-Sapieha, against which Kazimierz Jan Sapieha lodged protests. All of this resulted in de facto diarchy.

=== 1700 and the Great Northern War ===
In 1700 February, Augustus II was in war with Sweden and thus required military aid from the Sapiehas. On 3 July 1700, without the permission of the Commonwealth's Sejm, the King allowed Kazimierz Sapieha to hire an army of 3,660 soldiers to fight the Swedes. The Republicans opposed the formation of this corps, seeing it as leading to the reestablishment of Sapiehas' hegemony. Their fear was reinforced with the Sapiehas' success in gaining control of Lithuania's Treasury and Tribunal. The szlachta's dissatisfaction increased even more when they heard of the decision to quarter the Saxon Army and Sapieha's auxiliary corps raised for winter in the Grand Duchy's territory, even if the Republicans and the Sapiehas had agreed to disperse the Sapiehan auxiliary corps on 21 Augustus 1700.

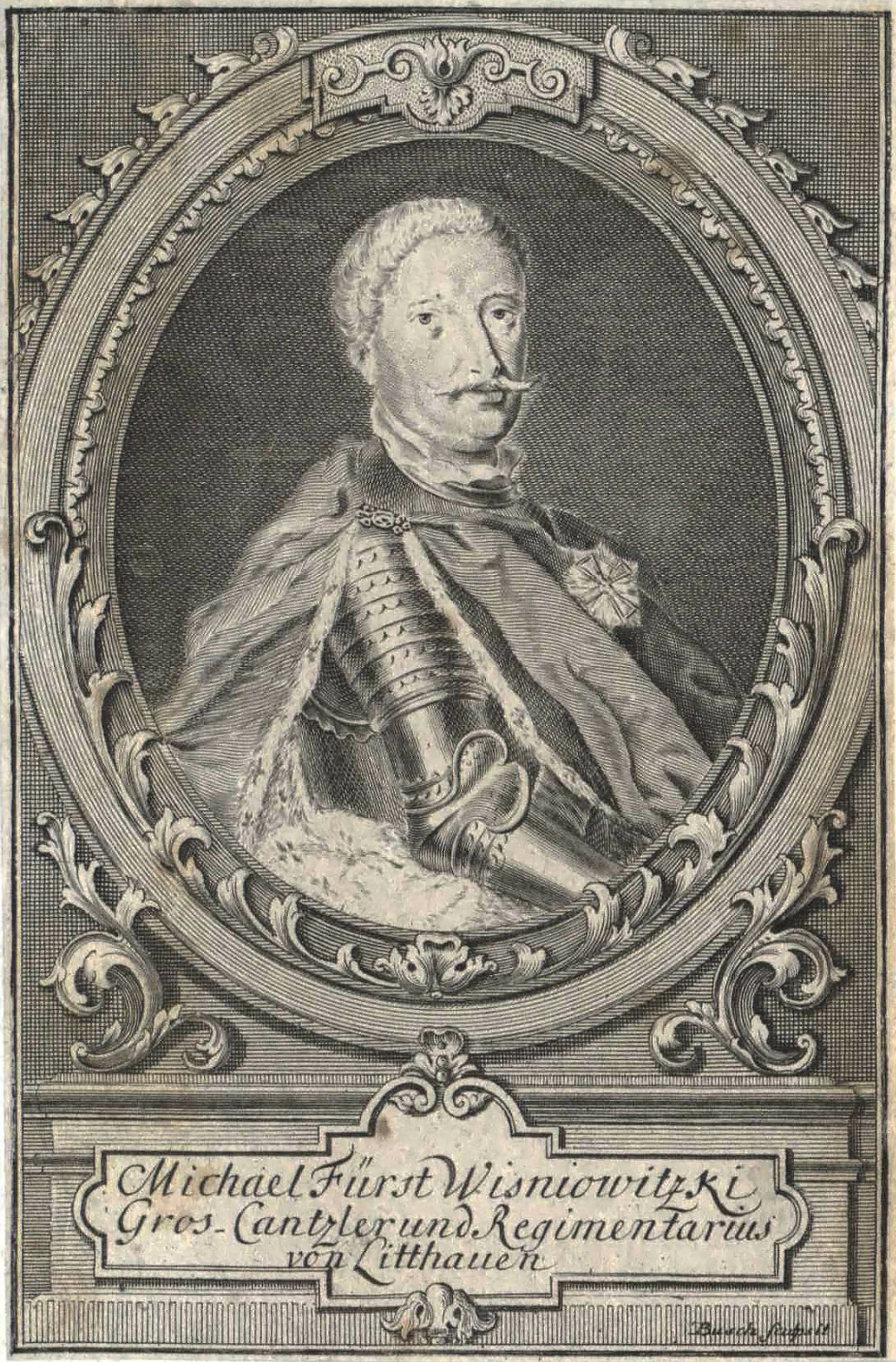
Lithuanian Field Hetman Michał Serwacy Wiśniowiecki

Wanting to halt the continued formation, dislocation of Sapieha's corps and the resulting reinstatement of Sapiehan hegemony, a pospolite ruszenie of the Lithuanian nobility was declared by the Republican leaders. They claimed they were doing it in accordance with the King's universal of July 1, which ordered the nobility to prepare the country's defence against Swedish invasion. This was a ruse, however, as there was no danger of Swedish invasion in the autumn of 1700, so it can be concluded that it was aimed at the Sapiehas.

Augustus II maneuvered in between the two sides, because he needed Sapieha's support, but still wanted to keep the power of Sapieha's in check. Moreover, the king illegally maintained the Saxon Army in Lithuania, pretending to do it for the protection of the nobles, while actually assembling his forces for the campaign of Livonia, as the Great Northern War had already started in 1700. Augustus II asked the Polish and Lithuanian senators to declare war on Sweden. The Polish refused, but Sapieha agreed, even if he protested against the stationing of the Saxon army. So, Sapieha was forced to recruit an army, which he did with the money he used to give the Saxons, and lead it.

==== Battle of Valkininkai ====
Sapieha also appealed to the Republicans, inviting them to contribute as well, but the Field Hetman of Lithuania Michał Serwacy Wiśniowiecki, instead of defending his country from the Swedes, attacked Sapieha at the Battle of Valkininkai. Misled by the insincere mediation of Bishop Brzostowski, Sapieha did not assemble enough troops and was defeated.

After the defeat, Sapieha left for Vilnius with his brother Benedykt, leaving his son, the Lithuania's Koniuszy Michał Sapieha to negotiate capitulation with the Confederates of Valkininkai. The enraged nobles did not want to negotiate, slashed the young Sapieha with swords and promulgated a confederative act depriving Kazimierz Sapieha of the Grand Hetman's position, manors and wealth. Ogińskis and his supporters occupied Vilnius, the Sapieha manors were ravaged, with Sapieha himself fleeing to Warsaw. Augustus II appointed a commission to investigate the quarrel and, now with Sapieha's consent, stationed the Saxon army in Lithuania.

== Aftermath ==
In the beginning of 1702, Swedish forces defeated Wiśniowiecki, but the Swedish leader himself was captured in March 24 at the Battle of Darsūniškis. On April 5, the Swedes unexpectedly attacked Wiśniowiecki in Vilnius. Without managing to destroy the arsenal, Wiśniowiecki fled Vilnius to Medininkai and from there to Ašmena, from where he reorganised to go on the offensive. On Easter, April 16, Wiśniowiecki ordered Pociej and Wołłowicz to attempt to regain Vilnius, while Wiśniowiecki himself attempted to enter Kaunas.

There was real confusion: noble meetings, confederations, declarations of pospolite ruszenie, skirmishes and wholesale plunder.

Disappointed by Augustus II, Kazimierz Sapieha greeted the Swedish invasion of Lithuania. When the Swedish army occupied Vilnius on 22 April 1702, the Hetman went to the capital and got Swedish support to assemble a few banners for himself. Kazimierz Sapieha still maintained the will to regain his power and so, the Lithuanian Civil War continued.

== See also ==
- Civil war in Poland (1704–1706), in which the Sapieha family generally supported the pro-Swedish Warsaw Confederation, while the anti-Swedish Sandomierz Confederation was supported by Augustus
- List of conflicts in Europe
- List of wars involving Lithuania
- List of civil wars
