= Michał Serwacy Wiśniowiecki =

Polish–Lithuanian nobleman (1680–1744)

Prince Michał Serwacy Wiśniowiecki Grand Chancellor of Lithuania Grand Hetman of Lithuania
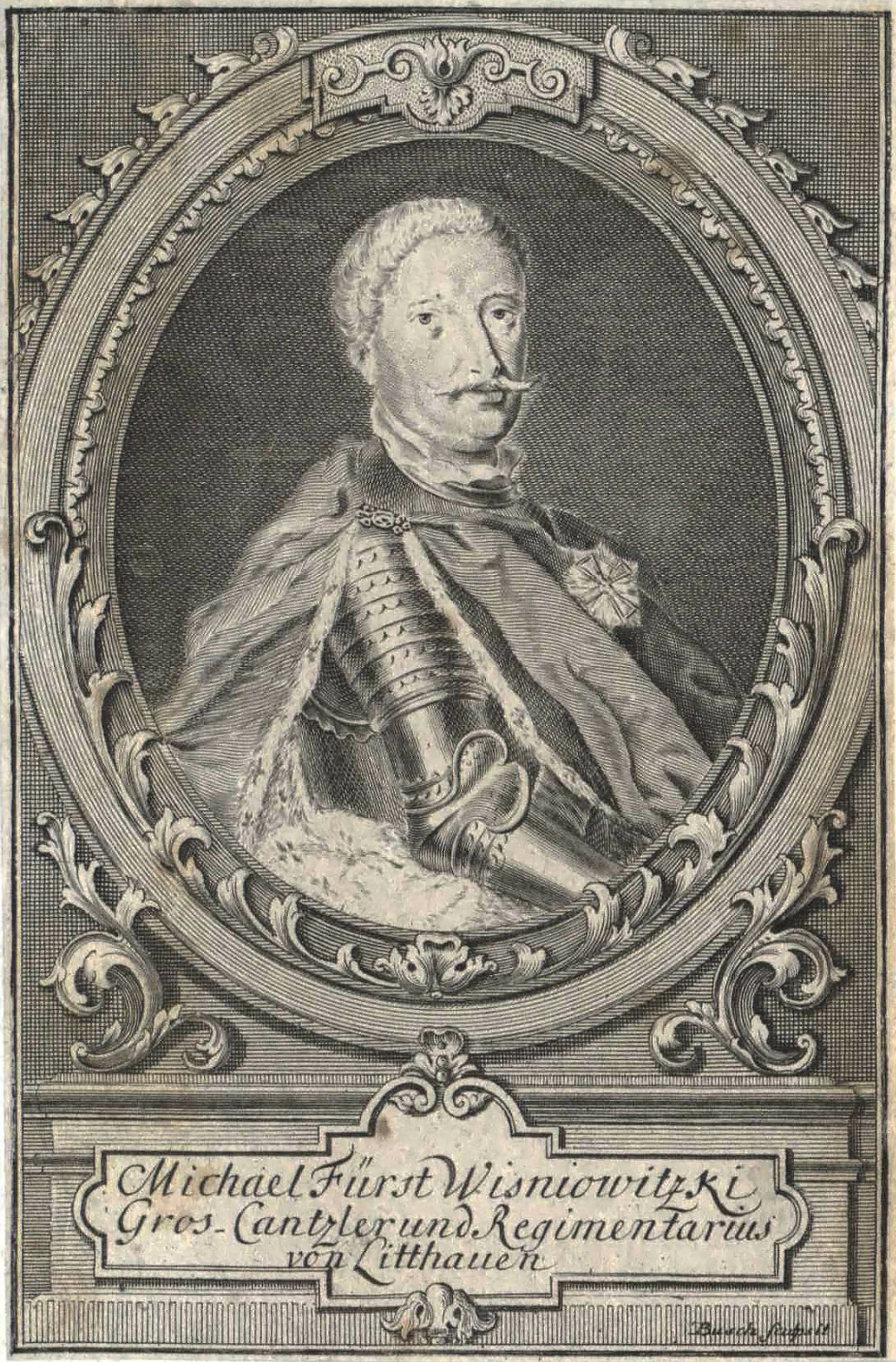
- Born: 13 May 1680; Lwów, Polish–Lithuanian Commonwealth
- Died: 18 September 1744 (aged 64); Merkinė, Polish–Lithuanian Commonwealth
- Education: Jesuit College, Lwów
- Title: Hetman, Prince
- Spouses: Catherine Dolska; Maria Magdalena Czartoryska; Tekla Róża Radziwiłł
- Children: Anna Wiśniowiecka; Katarzyna Wiśniowiecka
- Parent(s): Konstanty Krzysztof Wiśniowiecki; Anna Chodorowska

Prince Michał Serwacy Wiśniowiecki (Lithuanian: Mykolas Servacijus Višnioveckis; 13 May 1680 – 18 September 1744) was a Polish–Lithuanian nobleman (szlachcic), magnate, politician, diplomat, general, a successful military commander and the last male representative of the Wiśniowiecki family.

He was Field Hetman of Lithuania in 1703 and 1707–1735, Castellan of Vilnius from 1703, Grand Hetman of Lithuania in 1703–1707 and again in 1735, Regimentarz of the Lithuanian army from 1730, Voivode of Vilnius in 1706–1707 and 1735, marshal of the Lithuanian Tribunal, Grand Chancellor of Lithuania from 1720, Sejm Marshal from 11 June to 19 August 1703 in Lublin, and the governor of Pinsk, Vawkavysk, Hlyniany, Tuchola, Wilkisk, Wilkowsk, Metel and Merkinė.

During the Lithuanian Civil War of 1697–1702, Wiśniowiecki led the opposition against the Sapieha and defeated them in the battle of Valkininkai, burning their Ruzhany Palace to ashes. Supporter of Augustus II the Strong till 1707, when he switched to Stanisław Leszczyński's side. In the same year imprisoned by the Russians, since 1709 was exiled. In 1716, when he accepted Augustus II the Strong's rule, he returned to the country. In 1733, he supported the Russian intervention and forced election of Augustus III.

Wiśniowiecki was one of the wealthiest magnates in the Polish–Lithuanian Commonwealth and his burial ceremony in Wiśniowiec is considered as the most lavish of the 18th century in Poland.

== Early life and family ==
Because Wiśniowiecki's biological father died young, he and his older brother were raised by their stepfather, Jan Karol Dolski. Michał studied at the Jesuit college in Lwów, where he graduated in 1695. At the same time, his stepfather died and Wiśniowiecki's mother, desiring to keep the property and the wealth of her deceased husband, quickly arranged marriage of his daughter Catherine with Michał, although he was just 15 years old. The wedding took place without any publicity, in order to silence the protests of Catherine's family, who would confiscate her rightful estates and the money. Shortly after the wedding he left his wife in Poland and went on a trip abroad, during which he spent a year in the military academy in Paris. From abroad he returned in 1697 to take part in the new election of a king, during which he supported the candidacy of the Wettin family member and Elector of Saxony, Augustus II the Strong. At the same time, a conflict erupted between Michał and his mother about the former wealth of his stepfather. In this case the possession conflict also concerned his wife. Eventually, Michał and his brother inherited the fortune that Dolski left, however, this greatly and negatively influenced the relationship with his mother.

== Political and military career ==
=== Lithuanian Civil War in 1700 ===
Wiśniowiecki's proper political career began on the eve of the Lithuanian Civil War in 1700, when he was the leader of the opposition against Sapieha family clan and defeated them in the battle of Valkininkai, turning their Ruzhany Palace to ashes.

=== Great Northern War (1700–1721) ===
==== Civil war in Poland (1704–1706) ====
After becoming Speaker of the Parliament in Lublin, in 1703, the noble Diet appointed him Lithuanian Field Hetman, Castellan of Vilnius and eventually he gained the title of the Grand Lithuanian Hetman. Throughout the civil war period in the early eighteenth century, Wiśniowiecki supported Augustus II, but only few months after Augustus' abdication in 1707, he switched sides only to favour the new king Stanisław I Leszczyński.

Moreover, Michał was forced to give back the title of a Hetman and the province of Vilnius. After the defeat of the Swedish army at the Battle of Poltava that Wiśniowiecki aided and supported, he was forced (from the Russian side) to give up his family and possessions. After his refusal on 8 September 1709 he was immediately imprisoned by the Russian Imperial Army. Despite the intercession of many people, including king Augustus II himself, who then returned to Poland, Tsar Peter I was not going to release the prince, whom he considered a traitor and a liar. Only after a year Michał managed to escape, but for a long time he was unable to return to the country where the Russian troops remained and stationed, especially in the Grand Duchy of Lithuania. After several years of trying to restore the Leszczyński family on the Polish throne, and after heavy negotiations with Augustus, in spring of 1716 Wiśniowiecki returned to Poland, but the prince could not count on retaining his former titles and posts as these were already occupied by strong supporters and loyal friends of the king. It was only in 1720 that the post of Chancellor of Lithuania became vacant and after some hesitation, the king allowed Michał to become the Chancellor. Also during this time he was awarded the Order of the White Eagle.

=== Commander of the Lithuanian military ===
After the death of the Great Lithuanian Hetman Ludwik Pociej (1730), Prince Michał renewed his efforts to recover the title of a Hetman. But the king refused to trust him and Wiśniowiecki only received the position of commander-General (Regimentarz) in practice, however - in the absence of the Hetman - the monarch granted him full authority and command over the Grand Ducal Lithuanian Army.

=== War of the Polish Succession (1734–1738) ===
After the death of Tsar Peter I, Wiśniowiecki improved his relations with Russia and, therefore, in the course of the 1733 election he supported the election of Augustus III. As one of the few magnates he took part in the king's coronation in Wawel Cathedral of Kraków and, ironically, later fought against the supporters of Stanisław Leszczyński, although he himself preferred not to be involved in this conflict. In return for his services to the new king, in 1735 Michał fully regained the title of Hetman. He also received numerous counties, towns, villages and towards the end of his life Wiśniowiecki has become one of the strongest magnates in the Grand Duchy and the Eastern parts of the Commonwealth.

== Death and Funeral ==
He died on 16 September 1744 in the town of Merkinė. His third wife, Tekla Róża Radziwiłł organized an extravagant and lavish funeral that lasted nearly three days. During the ceremony, the guards presented the mourners and the audience with 12 portraits of his ancestors and a ceremonial breaking of the shield was conducted as a sign of extinction of the noble family.

== See also ==
- Polish nobility
- Wiśniowiecki family
- List of szlachta
