= Battle of Valkininkai (1700) =

1700 battle

- Part of Lithuanian Civil War (1697–1702)
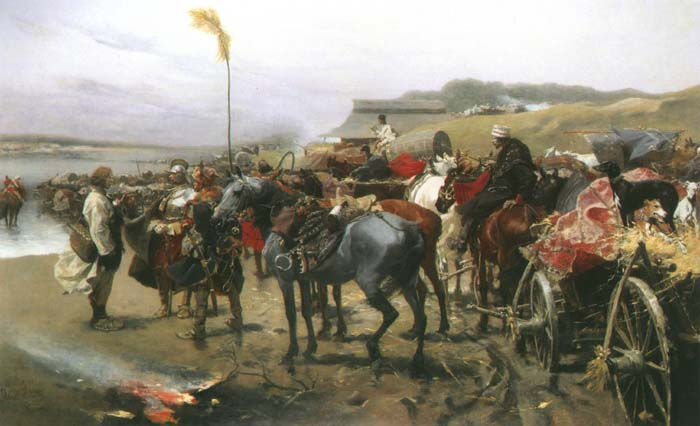
- A pospolite ruszenie of szlachta. Painting by Józef Brandt.
Date	November 18, 1700
Location	Valkininkai, Grand Duchy of Lithuania, Polish–Lithuanian Commonwealth (now Valkininkai, Lithuania) 54°21′N 24°50′E
Result	Victory for the anti-Sapieha coalition

Belligerents
Sapieha family and allies	Anti-Sapieha coalition

Commanders and leaders
Michał Sapieha †; Jan Kazimierz Sapieha	Michał Serwacy Wiśniowiecki; Grzegorz Antoni Ogiński; Michał Kazimierz Kociełł

Strength
3,000 professional and mercenary soldiers and artillery.	Around 12,000 pospolite ruszenie (levée en masse).

Casualties and losses
Several thousand	Several thousand

The Battle of Valkininkai (Lithuanian: Valkininkų mūšis, Polish: Bitwa pod Olkienikami) took place on November 18, 1700, during the Lithuanian Civil War, between forces of the Sapieha family, led by Michał Franciszek Sapieha, and an anti-Sapieha coalition of Wiśniowiecki, Ogiński, Radziwiłł and Pac families and their supporters (including a pospolite ruszenie of Lithuanian and Samogitian szlachta), led by Michał Serwacy Wiśniowiecki.

The anti-Sapieha confederates were victorious.

== Background ==
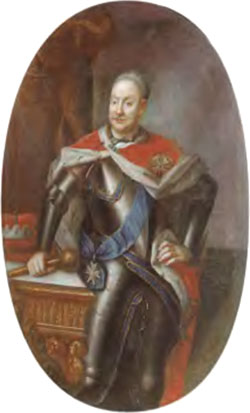
Michał Serwacy Wiśniowiecki, leader of the anti-Sapieha forces

Since the second half of the 16th century the Sapieha family of the Grand Duchy of Lithuania had risen to prominence and attained a premier rank among the magnate families of the Polish–Lithuanian Commonwealth. During the whole 17th century, the family monopolized most of Lithuania's top government offices. While these offices were not hereditary, the Sapiehas ensured that they remained within the family. Over time this contributed to growing resentment among other magnate clans and opposition to the Sapiehas began to form. Sapiehas' attempts to control local politics through sejmiks and their arrogation of other nobles' lands increased dissatisfaction among rank-and-file szlachta.

The volatile situation was furthered acerbated by the actions of the King of Poland, Augustus II the Strong. Augustus aimed to transform the weak position of the Polish-Lithuanian monarch into one based on the then current Western (and Russian) model of an absolute monarch. He saw the potential conflict in Lithuania as a possible excuse for an intervention which could then be utilized to strengthen royal power, as well as a means of weakening powerful magnate families in the region.

Augustus allowed the Grand Hetman of Lithuania, Jan Kazimierz Sapieha the Younger to conscript further forces for the Sapieha's private army, while at the same time he issued proclamations calling on the lesser nobility to defend their ancient privileges.

The anti-Sapieha coalition consisted of members of the Radziwiłł, Pac and Ogiński families, and had the support of medium and lesser nobles. It was further strengthened in April 1700, when Sapieha's soldiers and courtiers mistook a procession of the Princely Wiśniowiecki family in Vilnius, for that of the anti-Sapieha Kociełł family, attacked it and wounded two of its most prominent members Michał Serwacy Wiśniowiecki and Janusz Wiśniowiecki. As a result, the Wiśniowieckis joined the anti-Sapieha cause, with Michał Serwacy gaining the overall command of the coalition.

== Battle ==
Initial military engagements, at Lipniszki and in a skirmish on the Ashmyanka River, were favorable to the Sapiehas who commanded well trained professional troops against the szlachta's irregular forces.

In October the szlachta gathered in a camp near the town of Valkininkai. Forces of Sapieha, under Michał Franciszek Sapieha, left Vilnius in early November and arrived near Valkininkai in the middle of the month. Older accounts of the battle give the strength of the szlachta forces at around 20,000 and that of the Sapiehas at 8,000-9,000. Newer sources list lower figures; 12,000 for the szlachta and ~3,000 for the Sapiehas. It is generally agreed that the Sapieha troops were of superior quality. The Sapieha forces also had eight pieces of artillery, which the confederates lacked.

Last minute negotiations and an attempt at a truce was made by Bishop of Vilnius Konstanty Kazimierz Brzostowski, who while a long time Sapieha opponent, was genuinely worried about the extent of destruction that the civil war was going to cause in Lithuania. Brzostowski, accompanied by bishop suffragan Jan Mikołaj Zgierski, met with the Sapiehas at a tavern in nearby Leipalingis. The details of the proposed truce are unknown but the conditions were rejected by Sapiehas, who declared that things will have to be "settled with sabres".

A contemporary poem described the various regiments and their commanders on the anti-Sapieha side. The powiats supporting the confederates were:

- Ašmena (Kociell)
- Lyda
- Breslauja
- Trakai
- Gardinas
- Upytė
- Powiat Naugardukas (Radziwill)
- Slanimas
- Valkaviskas
- Vitebskas (Ogiński)
- Orša (Kmicic)
- Lietuvos Brasta
- Pinskas (Wisniowiecki)
- Mstislauja
- Lietuvos Minskas
- Samogitia (Ogiński)
- Polockas (Pac)

The counties supporting the Sapiehas were:

- Vilnius
- Ukmergė
- Kaunas
- Mozyrius
- Powiat Rečyca

The confederates placed their infantry in the center, the majority of the szlachta were on the right or in reserve, and the left wing was taken up by hired Wallachian cavalry. Wisniowiecki placed his troops between Valkininkai and Leipalingis, while Ogiński led his troops through the local forests in a wide encircling maneuver. The Sapiehas also placed their infantry in the center, their rajtars on the left, with the right taken up by Tatar troops.

== Aftermath ==
In the aftermath of the battle, a drunken mob of szlachta, encouraged by the Canon of Vilnius, Krzysztof Białłozor, whose brother had been executed by the Sapiehas the previous year, murdered many of the Sapieha leaders, including several prominent members of the family itself. Most notably, a mob lynched Michał Franciszek Sapieha, who was kept after the battle imprisoned in a nearby abbey. The battle and the subsequent slaughter marked the end of the dominance of the Sapiehas in the Polish–Lithuanian Commonwealth in general, and in the Grand Duchy of Lithuania in particular. Jan Kazimierz Sapieha managed to escape capture and fled to the Duchy of Prussia.

One of the participants on the Sapieha side was the then relatively unknown nobleman Stanisław Poniatowski, who would become an aide to Charles XII of Sweden and the father of Stanisław August Poniatowski, the last King of Poland. Poniatowski was spared from the slaughter which followed the battle because of his low rank, young age, and relatively low status at the time.

== Impact ==
Sapieha lose their position and status in Poland and Lithuania. Spill over into the Great Northern War.
