= Darsūniškis =

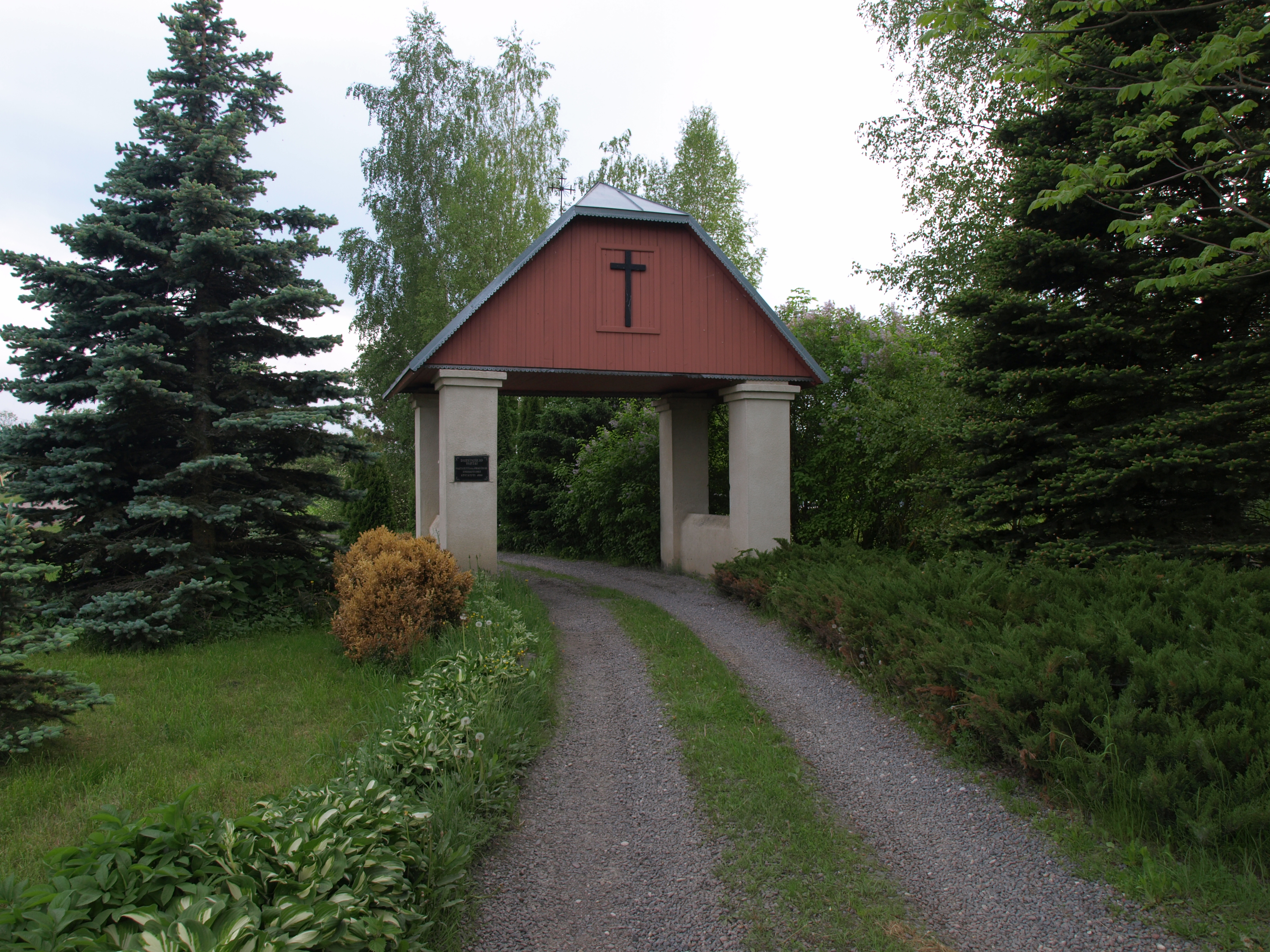
- Gates of Saint Agatha leading into the village

- Location of Darsūniškis
- Coordinates: 54°44′12″N 24°07′12″E
- Country: Lithuania
- County: Kaunas County
- Municipality: Kaišiadorys District Municipality
- Eldership: Krounis Eldership
- First mentioned: 1365
- Granted city rights: 1791

Population (2011)
  - Total: 307
- Time zone: UTC+2 (EET)
  - Summer (DST): UTC+3 (EEST)

Darsūniškis (Polish: Dorsuniszki, Yiddish: דאַרשונישאָק, Belarusian: Дарсунішкі, Darshonishok) is a settlement on the Nemunas River in Kaišiadorys District Municipality, western Lithuania. The village is one of the oldest settlements in Lithuania and dates back to the 14th century.

Three wooden entrance gates to the town with chapels and the Church of the Assumption of Virgin Mary (1848) are the most interesting monuments still preserved.

== History ==
=== Grand Duchy of Lithuania ===
The hill fort of Darsūniškis was part of the defense system against the Teutonic Order. It was located on the crusaders' path from Įsrutis in Prussia (today Chernyakhovsk) to Trakai. Mentioned in German sources as Dirsunen, the hill fort was burned by the Teutonic Knights in 1372 and in the following years.

Darsūniškis was the location of one of many Roman Catholic churches where the priests had to know the Lithuanian language according to the Grand Duke of Lithuania Alexander Jagiellon in 1501

==== 15th-17th centuries ====
The rebuilt castle was a favored hunting location of Grand Duke Vytautas, to whom the founding of the first church at the beginning of the 15th century is attributed. In the 15th century, Darsūniškis was already a town with a parochial church endowed by the Grand Duke of Lithuania in 1473 and 1492. The town with near estates (Polish: starostwo dorsuńskie) was granted to Barbara Radziwiłł, Queen of Poland and Grand Duchess of Lithuania.

In the 16th and 17th centuries, the town was a center of trade and crafts, especially wood trade. It had a pier for the trade of boats on the Nemunas River.

==== 18th century ====
On the beginning of the Great Northern War, Swedish regiments were defeated in the Battle of Darsūniškis on March 24, 1702, by the Lithuanian Army. Soon Charles XII of Sweden came with main forces and ordered to burn the town in revenge on 12 April 1702 - only the church was spared. On 7 December 1791, Darsūniškis received the privilege approving its Magdeburg rights (i.e. status of a city). The coat of arms was also confirmed.

=== 19th century ===
From the beginning of the 16th century to the 19th century, Darsūniškis was in the possession of the Ogiński family. The property was confiscated by the Russian government after the November Uprising of 1831.

Local census of 1890 counted 737 inhabitants of Darsūniškis (540 Lithuanians, 102 Jews, 90 Poles, 5 Russians).

=== 20th century ===
The Jewish citizens (about 15% of the general population in 1923) were killed during the Holocaust in Lithuania in August and September 1941 by the Lithuanians collaborating with Nazi Germany.
