= Michał Franciszek Sapieha =

Polish–Lithuanian noble (1670–1700)

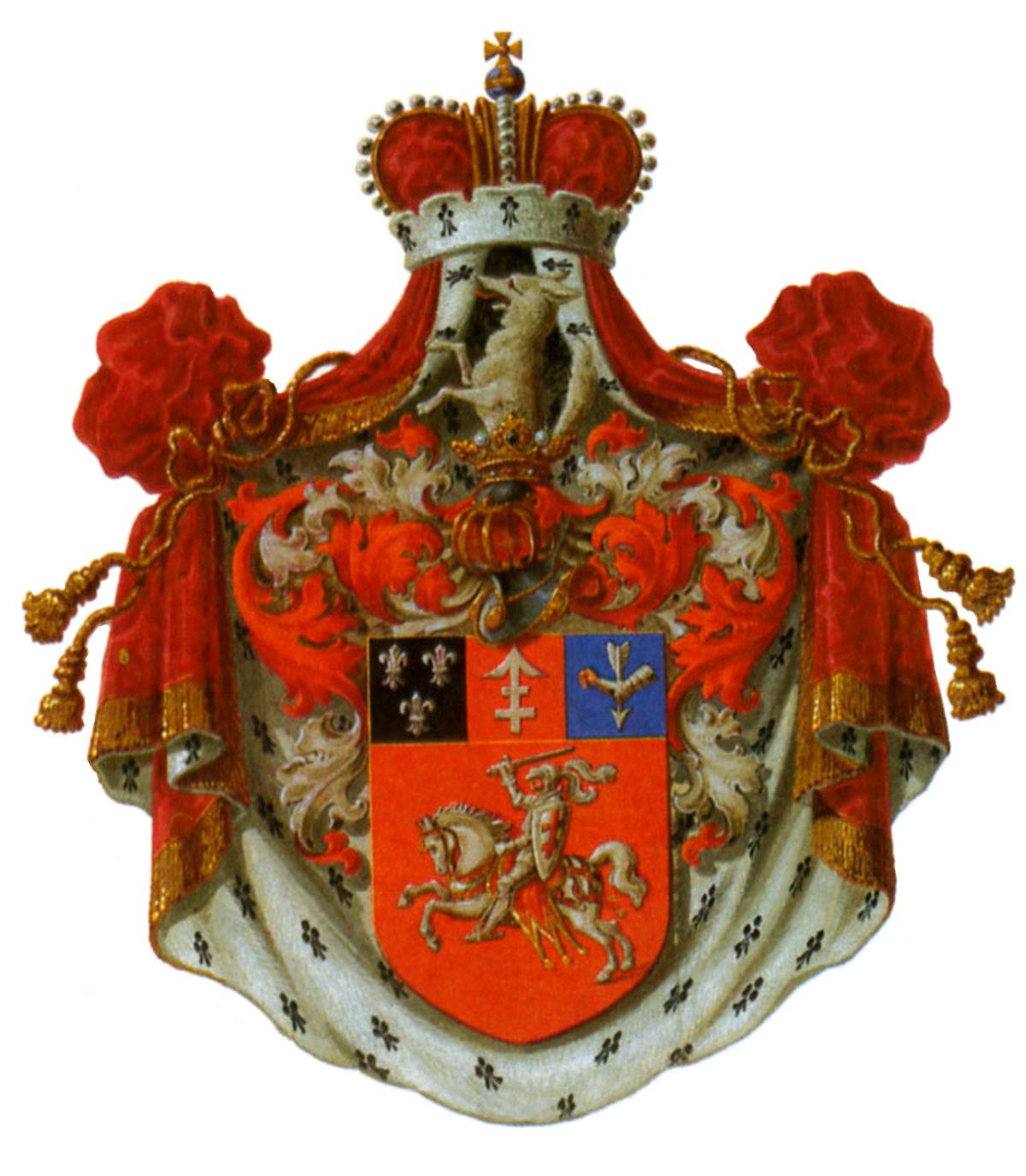
The Grand Coat of Arms of the Sapieha family.

Michał Franciszek Sapieha (1670 – November 19, 1700) was a Polish-Lithuanian magnate of the Sapieha family, Koniuszy (Master of the Horse) of Lithuania, and a general of Lithuanian and Russian armies.

He was a son of Kazimierz Jan Sapieha and his first wife Krystyna Barbara Hlebowicz.

In 1680 he attended a Jesuit college in Warsaw, then one in Braniewo. He participated in the campaign against Turkey of Emperor Leopold I in 1690, and then after John III Sobieski's Moldovian adventures, returned to the Polish–Lithuanian Commonwealth in 1691. In the spring of 1692 he was promoted to major general in the Habsburg army and in the years 1693–1694 fought in further wars against the Ottomans as head of the 47th Styrian Infantry Regiment. He participated in the Siege of Belgrade in 1693.

== Lithuanian Civil War ==
After returning home in 1695 he fought against the party of the Great Lithuanian Chancellor Karol Stanisław Radziwiłł whom he defeated. He supported the candidacy of Augustus II the Strong to the Polish-Lithuanian throne. From 1696 to 1700 he participated in battles against the anti-Sapieha coalition of Grzegorz Antoni Ogiński and of the Radziwiłł, Wiśniowiecki and Pac families in the Lithuanian Civil War.

After his surrender at the Battle of Valkininkai on November 18, 1700, he was murdered by a mob of drunken szlachta. One of the major culprits behind the crime was the Canon of Vilnius, Krzysztof Białłozor whose brother had been executed on Sapieha's orders a year earlier, and who instead of giving confession that Sapieha asked for, was the first to physically attack him. Michał was dragged out of the abbey where he was being kept prisoner, and hacked to death with sabres. His supporters who had been captured were killed along with him, while those who were merely suspected of being sympathetic to him were forced to slash at the corpse to prove their loyalty to the anti-Sapieha cause.

== Title ==
On 14 September 1700, Sapieha obtained the title of Prince from Emperor Leopold I. The title became extinct upon his death on 19 November 1700. That year the family lost its dominant position in the Grand Duchy as a result of its defeat in the Lithuanian Civil War. Most of the family members were stripped of their titles and privileges by the victorious confederates.

In 1768, members of the Sapieha family obtained recognition of the princely title from the Sejm of the Polish–Lithuanian Commonwealth. After the partitions of the Polish–Lithuanian Commonwealth, the family appeared in the list of persons authorized to bear the title of Prince of the Kingdom of Poland in 1824. The title was recognized in Austria in 1836 and 1840, and in Russia in 1874 and 1901. In 1905, the family obtained the qualification of Serene Highness in Austria.
