= Grzegorz Antoni Ogiński =

Polish–Lithuanian noble (1654–1709)

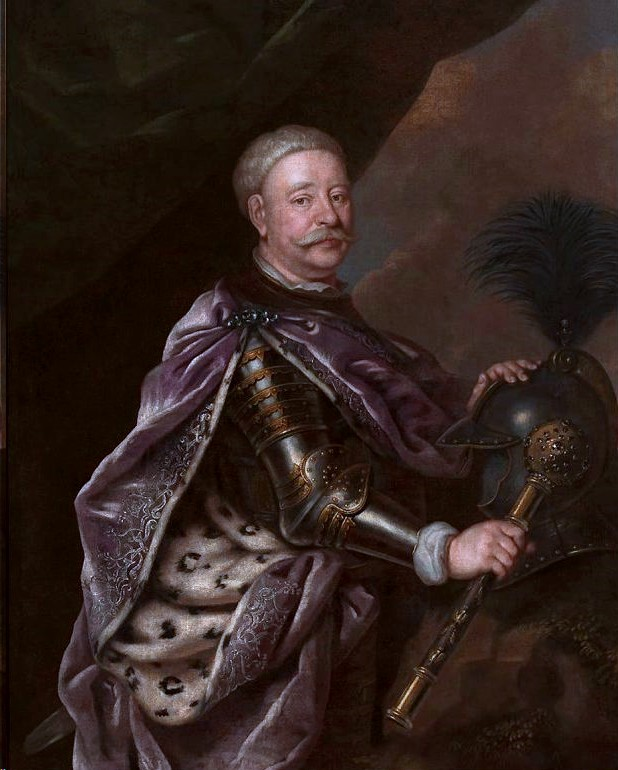
Portrait by François de la Croix, 1702

Grzegorz Antoni Ogiński (Lithuanian: Grigalius Antanas Oginskis; 23 June 1654 – 17 October 1709) was the Elder of Samogitia (1698–1709), Field Hetman of Lithuania (1703–1709) and Grand Hetman of Lithuania in 1709. He was the fourth and youngest son of Jan Jacek Ogiński, a Field Hetman of Lithuania.

Ogiński was one of the leaders of the uprising against the Sapieha Lithuanian magnates. He was successful in the Lithuanian Civil War which culminated in the Battle of Valkininkai on 18 November 1700. After the battle, Michał Franciszek Sapieha the main leader of the Sapieha faction, as well as many other members of the family and its supporters, were murdered by a drunken mob of szlachta.

Ogiński was a supporter and close associate of King Augustus II the Strong. He was made the Field Hetman of Lithuania on 20 November 1703 and in 1709 the Grand Hetman of Lithuania. He was made Knight of the Order of the White Eagle in 1705.

His father was Jan Jacek Ogiński (died 1684), also a Hetman. He was married to Teofila Czartoryska and had a son, Kazimierz Marcjan Ogiński (died 1727) and a daughter Elżbieta Magdalena Ogińska. He died in Lublin in 1709.
