= Žilinai =

- Village
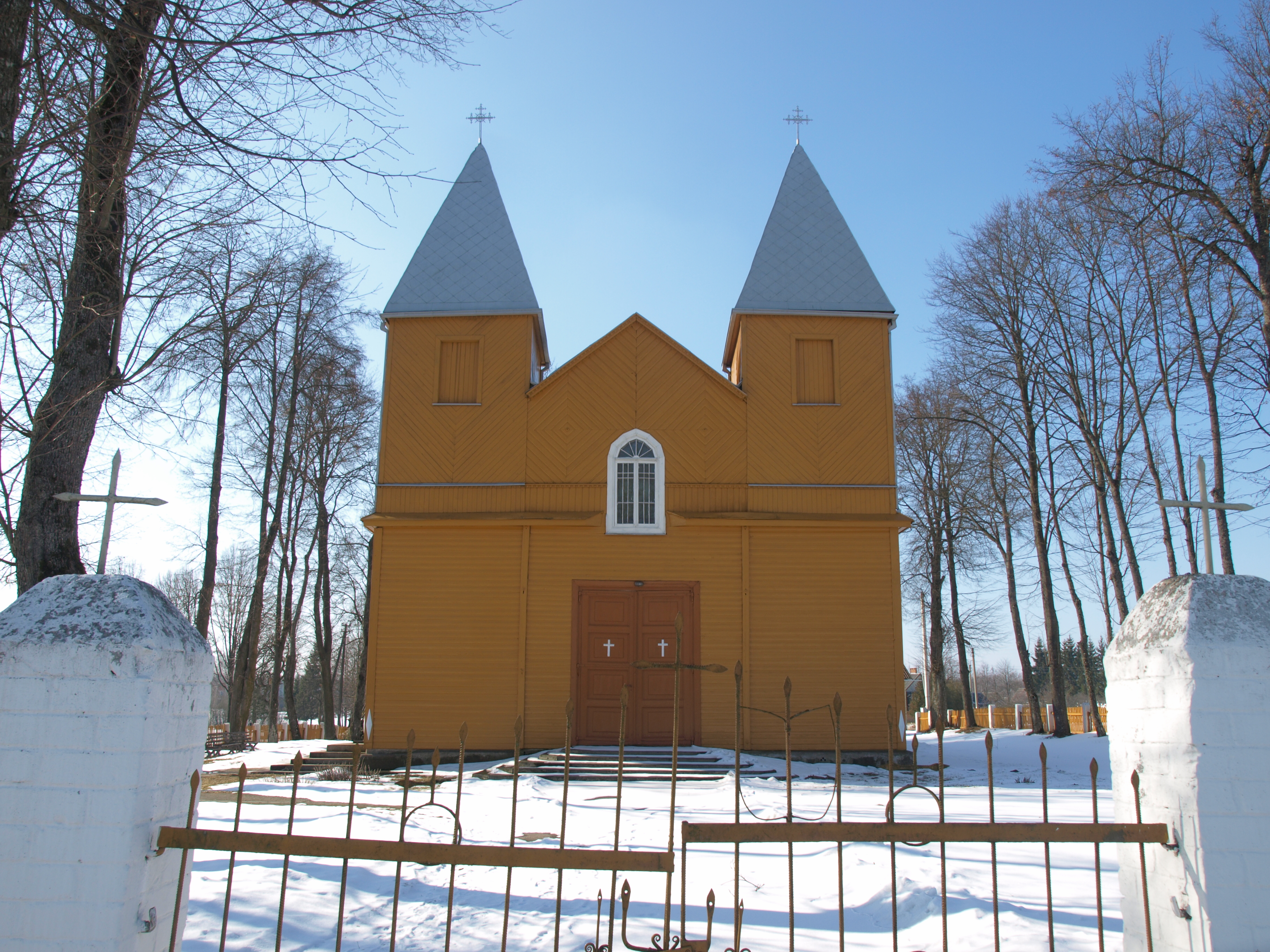

- Location in Varėna District Municipality Žilinai (Lithuania)
- Coordinates: 54°23′31″N 24°38′10″E
- Country: Lithuania
- County: Alytus
- Municipality: Varėna
- Eldership: Jakėnų

Population (2011)
  - Total: 392
- Time zone: UTC+2 (EET)
  - Summer (DST): UTC+3 (EEST)
- Postal code: 65417

Žilinai is a village (Lithuanian: kaimas) in Jakėnų eldership, Varėna District Municipality, Alytus County, in southeastern Lithuania. As of the 2011 census, the population was 392.

== History ==
In the 19th century, the settlement was the site of a manor and village. During the Soviet Lithuania era, it was the seat of the Žilinai District from 1950 to 1959 and was the site of a collective farm.

== Geography ==
The village is located in southeastern Lithuania, in the northern part of Varėna District Municipality. The nearest town is Onuškis, 11 kilometres (6.8 mi) to the north. It lies 16.6 kilometres (10.3 mi) north of the town of Varėna, the seat of the municipality. Vilnius is 53.2 kilometres (33.1 mi) to the northeast. The surrounding landscape is made up of marshland, peat bog and forest, with several lakes also nearby, including Lake Lielukas, Lake Netečius, Lake Steginis, and Lake Juodikis.

== Demographics ==
As of the census of 2011, there were 392 people, of which 46.9% were male and 53.1% female.

As of the census of 2001, there were 459 people, of which 47.3% were male and 52.7% female.

Historical population

Year	Pop.	±%
1923	117	—
1959	186	+59.0%
1970	197	+5.9%
1979	266	+35.0%

Year	Pop.	±%
1989	432	+62.4%
2001	459	+6.2%
2011	392	−14.6%

Source data

== Transportation ==
The village lies on the national road K4724 (Onuškis – Žilinai – Puodžiai) with links north and south.

== Points of interest ==
- Church of St Anthony of Padua (Lithuanian: Šv. Antano Paduviečio bažnyčia), a wooden Catholic church built in 1927
