= Jan Jacek Ogiński =

Jan Jacek Ogiński (also known as Jan Samuelewicz Ogiński; Lithuanian: Jonas Jackus Oginskis; 1619 – 24 February 1684, Kraków) was a nobleman, commander and statesman of the Grand Duchy of Lithuania. He served as hetman of Lithuania from 1682 to 1684, an office also later held by the youngest of Jan's four sons, Grzegorz Antoni Ogiński.
