= Battle of Darsūniškis =

Battle of the Great Northern War, 1702

- Part of the Swedish invasion of the Polish–Lithuanian Commonwealth during the Great Northern War
Date	13 March 1702 (O.S.); 14 March 1702 (Swedish calendar); 24 March 1702 (N.S.)
Location	Darsūniškis, Duchy of Samogitia, Grand Duchy of Lithuania, Polish–Lithuanian Commonwealth 54°44′12″N 24°07′12″E
Result	Polish–Lithuanian victory

Belligerents
Swedish Empire	Polish–Lithuanian Commonwealth

Commanders and leaders
Alexander Hummerhielm; Gustaf Henrik Siegroth	Michał Serwacy Wiśniowiecki

Strength
240	6,000

Casualties and losses
145 killed	Unknown

The Battle of Darsūniškis took place on March 24, 1702, near the town of Darsūniškis (Polish: Dorsuniszki) during the Swedish invasion of Poland in the Great Northern War. The Swedish army of about 240 men under the command of Alexander Hummerhielm was defeated by the Polish–Lithuanian army of 6,000 men under Michał Serwacy Wiśniowiecki.

== Background ==
After having Crossed the Düna the victorious Swedish army occupied all of Courland where after they began their campaign against Polish–Lithuanian mainland in the winter of 1701–1702. Charles XII of Sweden was determined to end the hostiles between the Saxon and Polish armies before starting an invasion of Russia and so he sent his Vanguard of Alexander Hummerhielm to seize footholds in Lithuania before the arrival of the main army. On March 22, 1702, general Hummerhielm marched out of Kaunas to collect six cannons previously taken from the Lithuanian army after a fierce skirmish near the Jieznas castle. The Swedish infantry consisting of 110 men under Gustaf Henrik Siegroth traveled in carriages along the Nemunas River and the cavalry of 130 men under Hummerhielm walked alongside the banks.

== Battle ==
After three days the troops arrived at linkewitzhoff where after they continued their march the next day towards the town of Darsūniškis where Hummerhielm went with his cavalry force to scout a distance away from his infantry. Here he was attacked by the vanguard of Michał Serwacy Wiśniowiecki's army which consisted of roughly 6,000 men. The Lithuanian attack was repulsed and the Swedish cavalry started persecuting their defeated opponents until they were ambushed by the whole army of Wiśniowiecki. Hummerhielm was quickly captured but his men continued resisting until there were only 20 wounded Swedish cavalry men left who were all captured and the rest killed, except for one man who made it over Nemunas to report to the main Swedish army of their defeat.

== Battle on the Neman River ==
Gustaf Henrik Siegroth, who still made his way up the Nemunas river with his 110 infantry had heard nothing of Hummerheim's defeat and so Wiśniowiecki managed to surprise also him with his vanguard, which was, however, repulsed. Siegroth then tried to make it across the river to safety but his prams got stuck on the river bank, whereof Wiśniowiecki encircled his force in a half moon formation and positioned four of his cannons on the high ground over the Swedish landing. The battle raged for two hours, with constant attacks and cannon fire, and on twelve o'clock Wiśniowiecki sent a Parlimentaire to request the surrender of Siegroth's force, whom, however refused. The Lithuanian forces then brought another three cannons opposite the direction of their previous four, to eliminate the Swedes with cross fire. One of the cannons got so close to the Swedish fire that they soon had to abandon it. On two o'clock the Lithuanian commander, who had been unable to break the Swedish defense, sent another Parlimentaire to the Swedes, telling them Hummerhielms force had previously been defeated and that there would be no reinforcements. Siegroth, however, once again refused to surrender, suggesting he would only agree if his army was allowed to march out avoiding being made prisoners. In turn, Wiśniowiecki denied the suggestion and the fight continued for another two hours, when finally, four o'clock, after six hours of fighting, Wiśniowiecki allowed the Swedes under Siegroth to march back to Kaunas, by then, six men of his force had been killed and another nine men wounded.

== Aftermath ==
On 12 April 1702 the Swedish king Charles XII arrived to the scene where the outnumbered Swedish forces had fought and let disinter their bodies and reburied with all military funeral honors (muskets salute). Leaving the place Charles XII ordered to burn the town Darsūniškis to the ground on 12 April 1702.

The Swedish army was not yet officially in war with the Polish–Lithuanian Commonwealth, however, the battle had been decisive in the kings' decision to fully start the Polish campaign, in order to dethrone Augustus II from the throne.
