= Valkininkai =

- Town
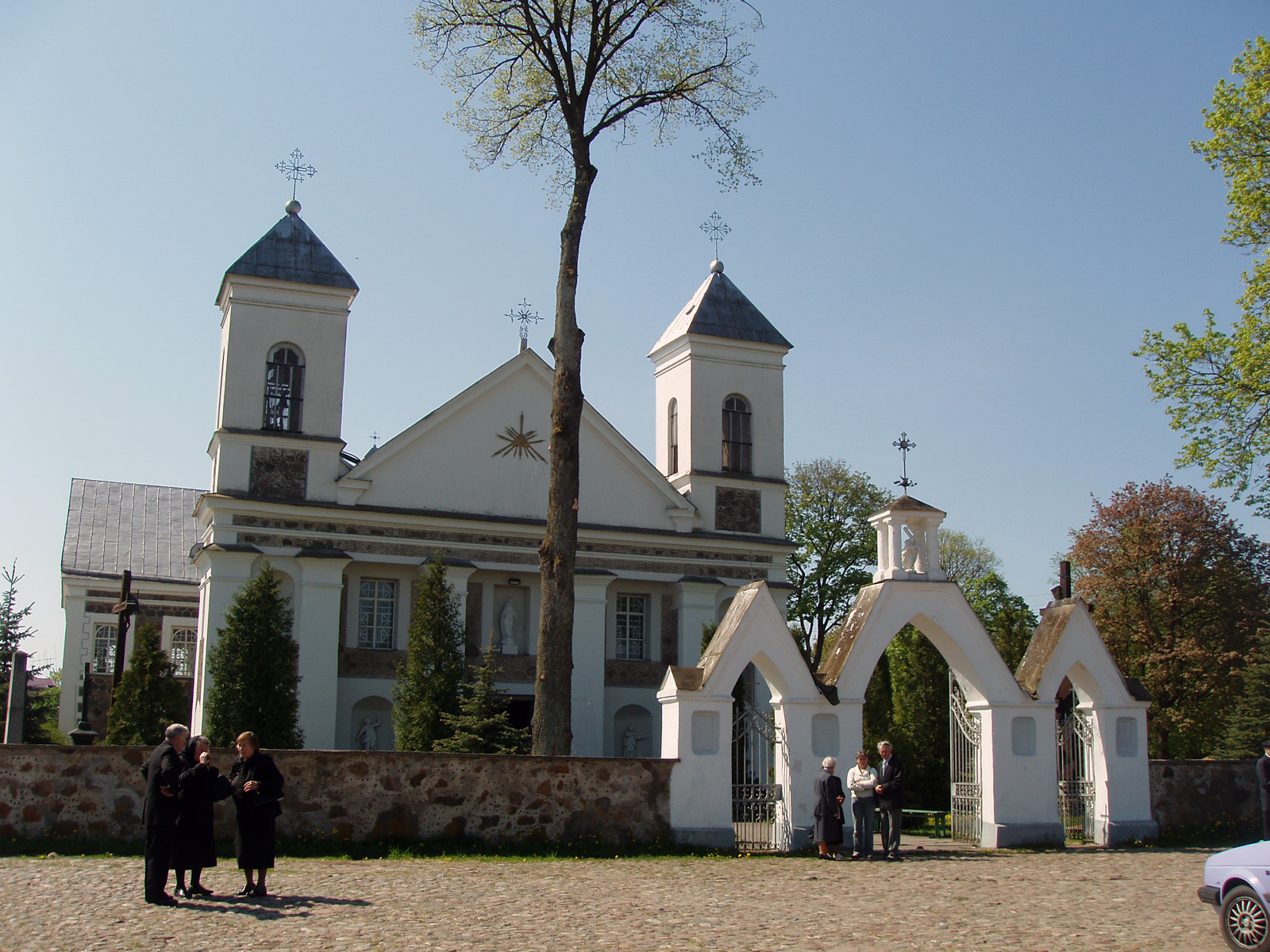
- Church of Valikininkai

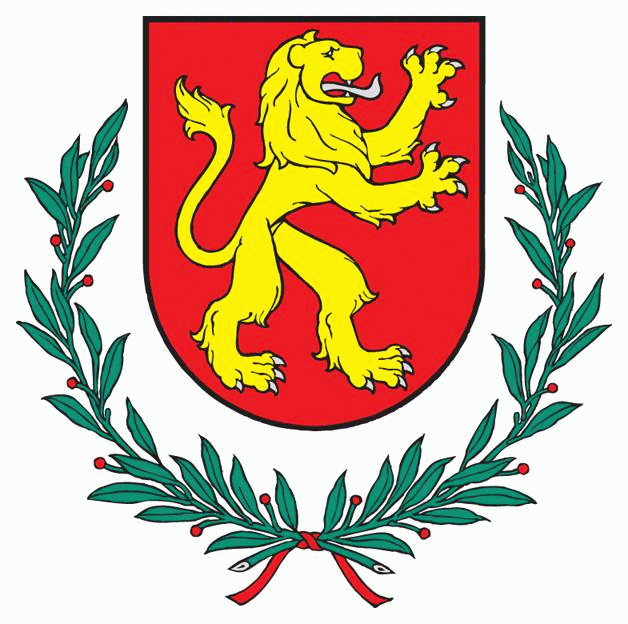
- Coat of arms

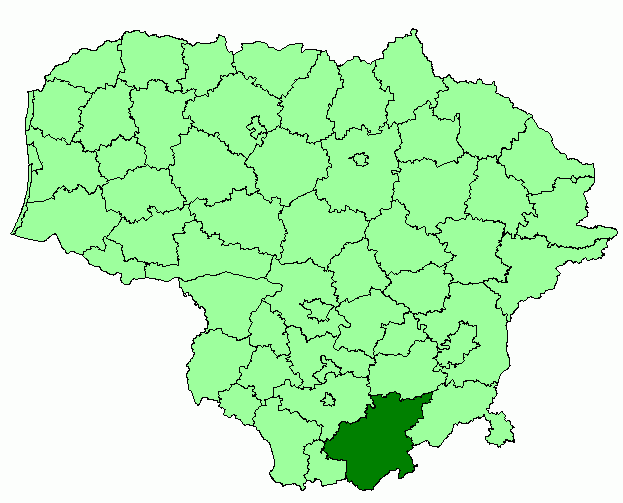
- Location in Varėna district municipality Location of Varėna district in Lithuania
- Coordinates: 54°21′20″N 24°50′20″E
- Country: Lithuania
- County: Alytus County
- Municipality: Varėna district municipality
- Eldership: Valkininkų (Valkininkai)
- Capital of: Valkininkai eldership
- First mentioned: 1387
- Granted city rights: 1571, 1723, 1792

Population (2011 Census)
  - Total: 229
- Time zone: UTC+2 (EET)
  - Summer (DST): UTC+3 (EEST)

Valkininkai (Polish: Olkieniki) is a historic town in Valkininkų (Valkininkai) eldership, Varėna District Municipality, Alytus County, Lithuania, located about 22 km (14 mi) northeast from Varėna and about 55 km (34 mi) southwest from Vilnius. At the Lithuanian census of 2001, its population was 238 and at the census of 2011 it was 229.

The town is situated on the confluence of Merkys River with its tributaries Šalčia and Geluža. About 8 km (5.0 mi) east of Valkininkai there is Valkininkai Train Station, a settlement that grew around a train station on the Saint Petersburg–Warsaw railway and now has more residents.

== History ==
=== Grand Duchy of Lithuania ===
It is believed that Valkininkai was first mentioned in a letter from Grand Duke Jogaila to his brother Skirgaila in 1387. The settlement developed on a large island (since then disappeared) in Merkys River. Situated near the Gardinas–Varėna–Vilnius route, the settlement had a royal estate that Grand Dukes used as a hunting lodge. The route further grew in importance after the 1385 Union of Krewo as it connected the Lithuanian capital in Vilnius with the Polish capital in Kraków. In 1418, Grand Duke Vytautas the Great gave the estate to his wife Uliana Olshanska.

In 1503, the town was mentioned as a seat of a volost. In 1516, King Sigismund I the Old accepted envoys of Charles, King of Spain and future Holy Roman Emperor in Valkininkai. A royal cannon foundry, established in 1551 and powered by a watermill, is credited for the growth of the town. Needed iron ore was collected in local swamps and imported from abroad. During the Volok Reform, craftsmen were given land and relocated from the town to nearby villages, which were often named after their craft. Such villages included Čebatoriai (shoemakers), Puodžiai (potters), Kaniūkai (hostlers), Juodieji Kalviai (blacksmiths), Strielčiai (bowmen). In 1571, Valkininkai was granted city rights under Magdeburg law (the privilege was later renewed in 1723 and 1792).

According to 1601 register, the town had 150 families (900–1050 people), 19 butchers, 89 pubs, and 157 craftsmen. The town grew as a trade and craft center and attracted the first Jewish settlers.

Valkininkai suffered from a series of wars. The town was devastated during the Second Northern War (1655–1660) and lost 75–80% of the population. The royal cannon foundry was looted and closed.

In 1701, during the Lithuanian Civil War between Sapieha family and other magnates of the Grand Duchy of Lithuania, a major battle was fought near the town. The town somewhat recovered, and its population reached about 800 residents in 1749 and 949 residents (including 273 Jews) in 1790. Within the Grand Duchy of Lithuania, Valkininkai was part of Trakai Voivodeship. In 1795, Valkininkai was annexed by the Russian Empire in the course of the Third Partition of the Polish–Lithuanian Commonwealth.

=== Early modern period ===
Historical population
Year	Pop.	±%
1790	949	—
1841	1,516	+59.7%
1897	2,619	+72.8%
1919	1,244	−52.5%
1959	769	−38.2%
1970	410	−46.7%
1987	277	−32.4%
2011	229	−17.3%

In 1812, the town was ravaged by Napoleon I armies during the French invasion of Russia. Instances of famine, caused by the war, were recorded as late as 1822. Completion of the Saint Petersburg–Warsaw railway in 1862 and increased demand for local timber helped the town to recover and grow: the population increased from 1,516 in 1841 to 2,619 (including 1,126 Jews) in 1897. However, industrialization was slow: a large paper and cardboard factory, employing some 100 people, was established in the last decade of the 19th century and a turpentine factory (10–14 employees) was established in 1923. In the interbellum, it was the seat of a gmina within the Wilno-Troki County in the Wilno Voivodeship in Poland.

Following the joint German-Soviet invasion of Poland, it was invaded by the Soviets in 1939, and then by Germany in 1941. Around 400 Jews from Valkininkai were executed in Eišiškės in September 1941 by Rollkommando Hamann and only five Jews (four of them hidden by friendly Lithuanians) survived World War II. In 1944, the town was re-occupied by the Soviet Union, which eventually annexed it from Poland into the Lithuanian SSR.

== Religion ==
The first church was built in the early 16th century. In 1581, Queen Bona Sforza built a new Church of the Visitation of the Blessed Virgin Mary and established a parish with the seat in Valkininkai. The wooden church burned down in 1655 and 1772, and was wrecked by a storm in 1818. The present-day brick and stone church was built in 1823–1837 in Neoclassical style. In 1896–1898, the length of the church increased twofold when a transept and apse were added, giving the church traditional cross-shaped floor plan. The central nave has a cylindrical vault; the original construction plan envisioned a small dome, but it was never built. From 1910 to 1916, Vladas Mironas, future Prime Minister of Lithuania, was the pastor at Valkininkai church. The church displays sacred relics of Boniface of Tarsus, a 4th-century martyr, whose body was excavated from Roman catacombs and transported to Lithuania in 1765.

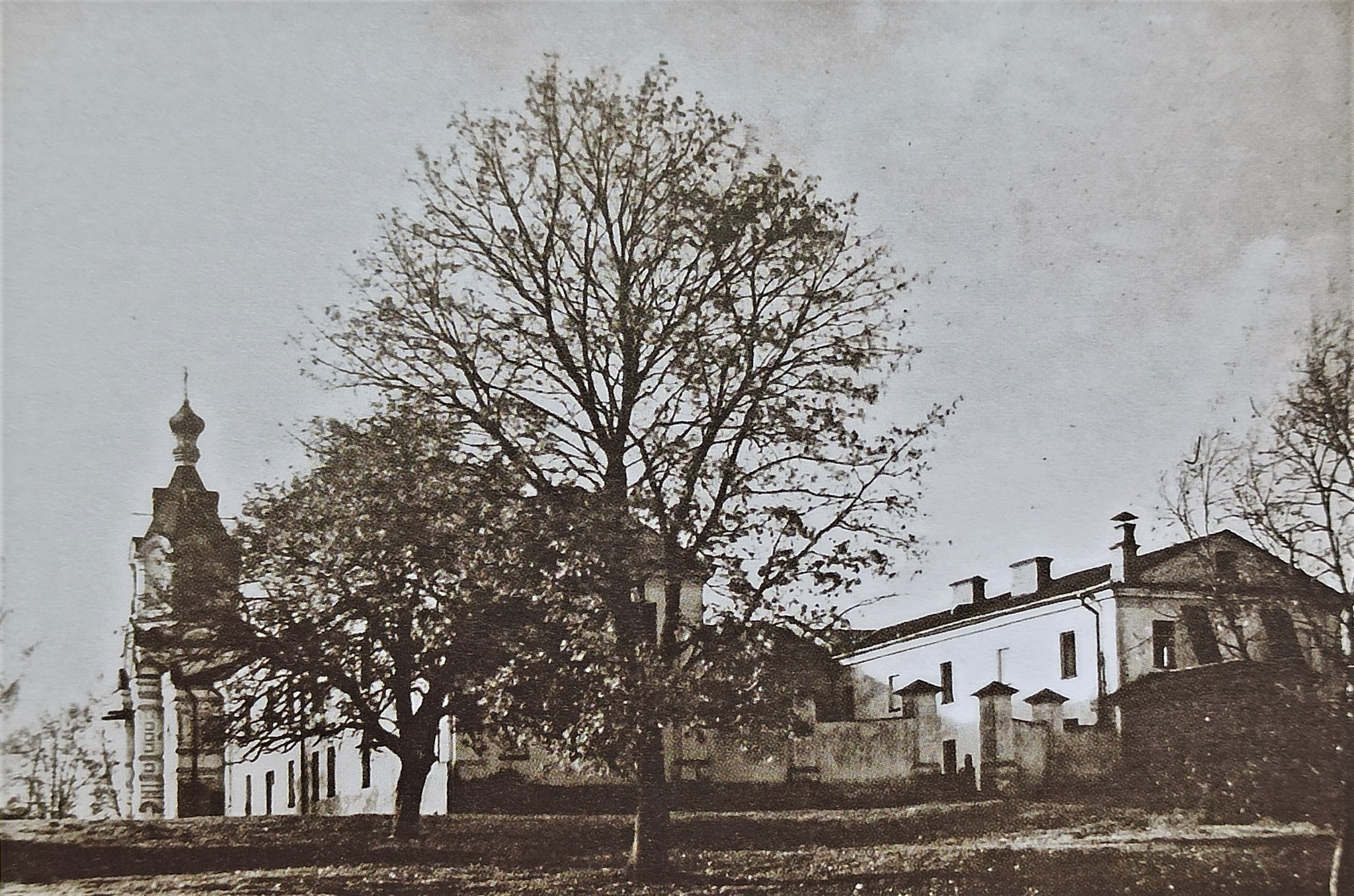
Franciscan monastery in the 1920s

In 1635 or 1636, Franciscan friars established a monastery, which became the most prominent structure in the town. It was closed in 1832 after the failed November Uprising against the Russian Empire and turned into military barracks. After the January Uprising of 1863, the former monastery church was turned into a parish church of the Eastern Orthodox, even the new parish had only 75 Orthodox believers, mostly Russian officials. Such decision was part of wider Russification campaign, that included the Lithuanian press ban. In 1883, the Orthodox church was reconstructed and acquired features of Byzantine Revival. During World War I most of the Orthodox community evacuated to Russia and the church was abandoned. However, it was not returned to the Catholics – the church was transformed into a hall for dances, concerts, and plays. During World War II, Germans used the former monastery as a camp for war prisoners. In 1944, the monastery and its church were burned down and demolished.

The Jewish community built a wooden synagogue in Valkininkai at the end of the 18th century. It was rebuilt in 1801. According to a legend, Napoleon stopped in the town during his invasion of Russia and was greeted by the Jewish community. Impressed with the hospitality Napoleon gifted his red velvet saddle pad, richly decorated and bearing his initials. The gift was prominently displayed in the synagogue. In 1880, a smaller synagogue was built nearby. The synagogues were burned during the first days of the occupation of Lithuania by Nazi Germany.

== Architecture ==
The urban layout, which formed in the 16th century and is preserved to this day, was declared an urban monument and is protected by the state. Most valuable monuments are the street grid and main market square. The market square formed at the crossing of four main roads. It is long (its length is 8 times its width) and irregularly triangle.

== Coat of arms ==
Valkininkai together with 73 other towns was granted city rights and coat of arms in 1792 by King Stanisław August Poniatowski during the Four-Year Sejm. The arms depicted a golden lion with silver tongue, teeth, and nails. The shield was surrounded by two laurel branches with red berries. The arms and city rights were abolished the same year after the Second Partition of Poland–Lithuania. The coat of arms were modernized by artist Taida Balčiūnaitė and reinstated by a presidential decree in February 1993.
