= Kryszpin coat of arms =

Polish coat of arms

Kryszpin
- Alternative name: none known
- Earliest mention: unknown
- Towns: none
- Families: Kirszensztajn, Kirschenstein, Kryspin, Kryszpin

Kryszpin is a Polish coat of arms. It was used by several szlachta families in the times of the Polish–Lithuanian Commonwealth.

== History ==
The exact story behind this coat of arms is unknown. Both its blazoning and the features used are probably of foreign origin and were naturalised in Polish heraldry sometime in the 16th century, probably of German origin. It is somehow related to the Nieczuja coat of arms.

It was commonly used by the Krišpinas Kiršenšteinas family, two members of whom are mentioned in the Notable Bearers list.

== Blazon ==
Parted per pale, or and azure, in dexter two deer heads couped argent, in sinister lion passant argent. Both divided by a tree rump proper.

Out of a crest coronet, between two vols, peacock's feathers.

== Notable bearers ==
Notable bearers of this coat of arms include:

- Hieronim Kirszensztajn, podskarbi of Lithuania (1663–1676)
- Andrzej Kryszpin, voivod of Vitebsk

== See also ==
- Polish heraldry
- Heraldry
- Coat of arms
