= Jakėnai Eldership =

Jakėnai Eldership Jakėnų seniūnija
- Eldership
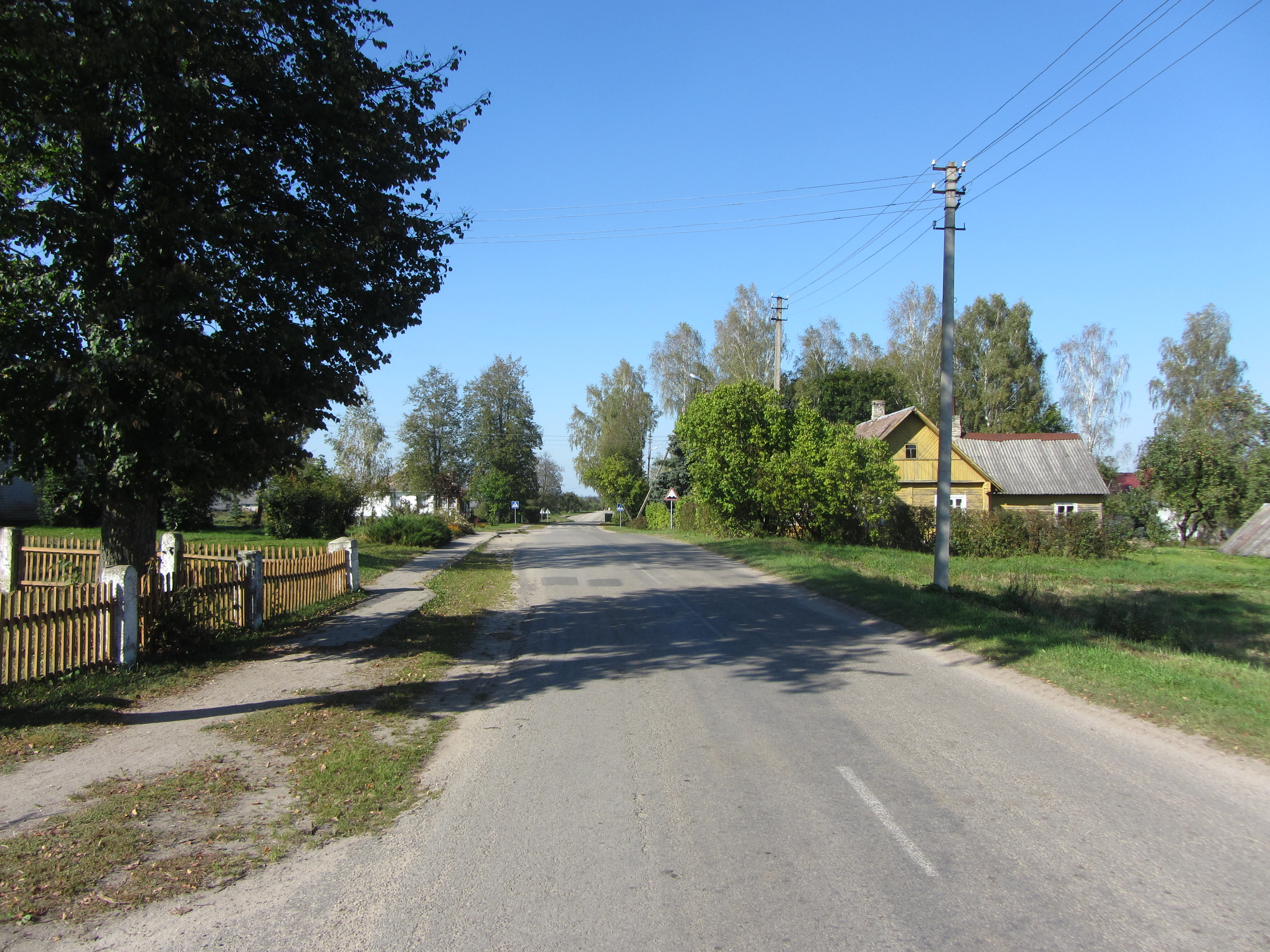
- Street of Žilinai

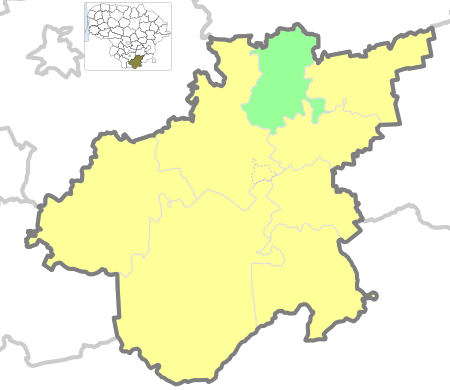
- Location of Jakėnai Eldership
- Coordinates: 54.361°N 24.628°E
- Country: Lithuania
- Ethnographic region: Dzūkija
- County: Alytus County
- Municipality: Varėna District Municipality
- Administrative centre: Jakėnai

Area
  - Total: 149 km^{2} (58 sq mi)

Population (2021)
  - Total: 957
  - Density: 6.42/km^{2} (16.6/sq mi)
- Time zone: UTC+2 (EET)
  - Summer (DST): UTC+3 (EEST)

Jakėnai Eldership (Lithuanian: Jakėnų seniūnija) is a Lithuanian eldership, located in the northern part of Varėna District Municipality.
