= Čebatoriai =

- Village
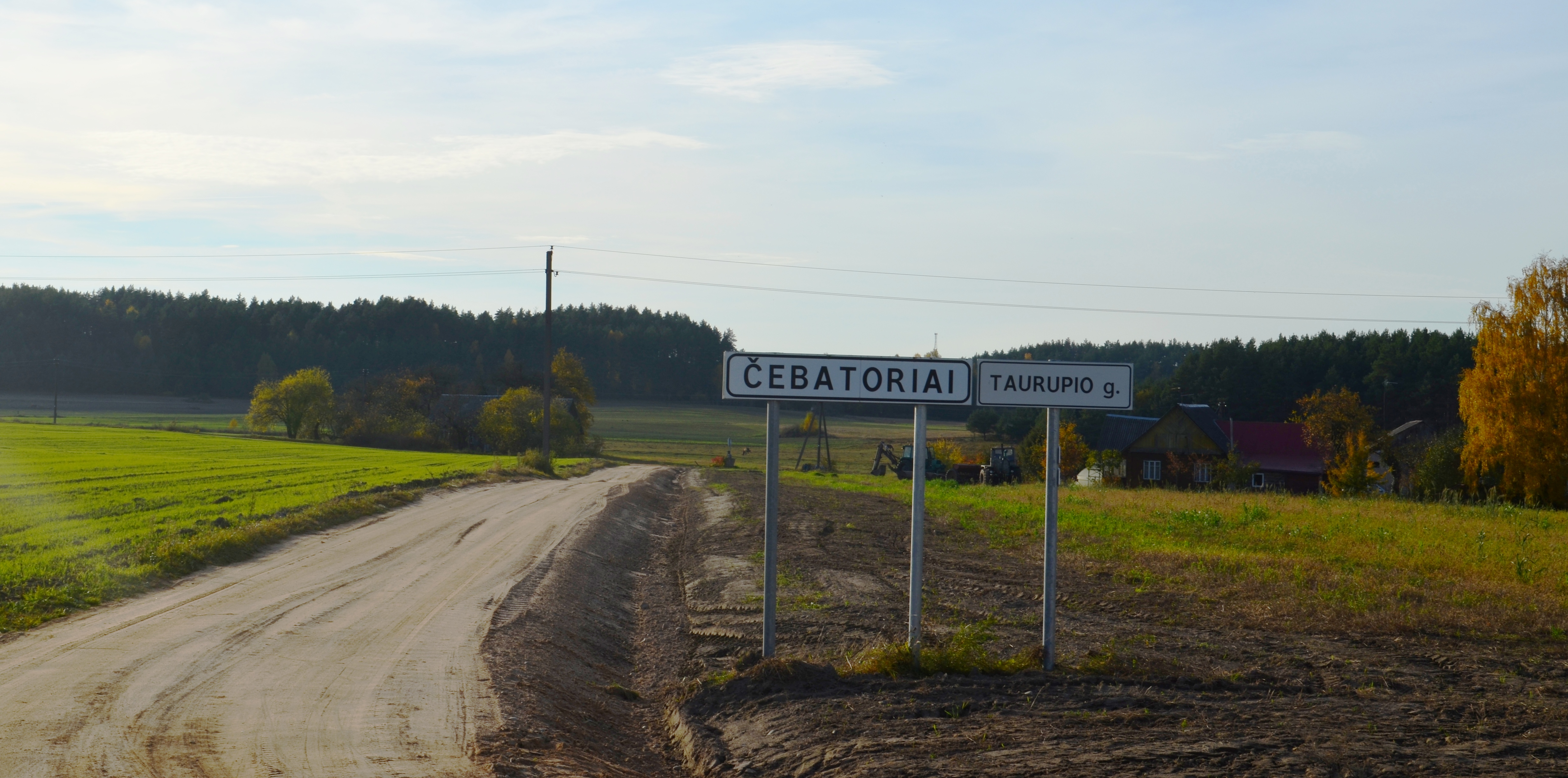

- Location within Lithuania
- Coordinates: 54°17′40″N 24°51′20″E
- Country: Lithuania
- County: Alytus County
- Municipality: Varėna district municipality
- Eldership: Matuizos eldership

Population (2001)
  - Total: 114
- Time zone: UTC+2 (EET)
  - Summer (DST): UTC+3 (EEST)

Čebatoriai is a village in Varėna district municipality, in Alytus County, in southeastern Lithuania. According to the 2001 census, the village has a population of 114 people.

== Etymology ==
The name Čebatoriai comes from a word Lithuanian: čebatõrius (a borrowing from Belarusian: чaбaтap) which means 'a shoemaker'.
