= Lithuanian Tribunal =

Former appellate court in Lithuania

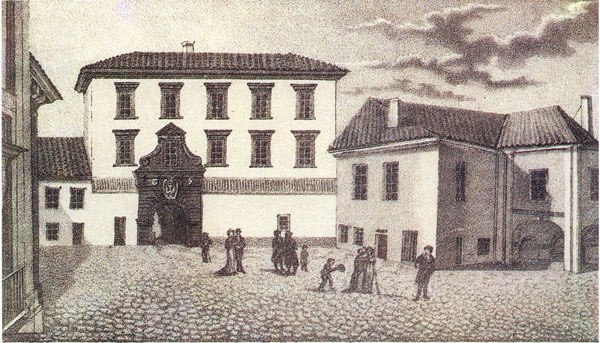
Palace of the Lithuanian Tribunal (1835) in the present-day Pilies Street, Vilnius

The Lithuanian Tribunal (Lithuanian: Lietuvos Didžiosios Kunigaikštystės Vyriausiasis Tribunolas or Lietuvos Tribunolas; Polish: Trybunał Główny Wielkiego Księstwa Litewskiego) was the highest appellate court for the nobility of the Grand Duchy of Lithuania. It was established by the Grand Duke of Lithuania and King of Poland Stephen Báthory in 1581 as the counterpart to the Crown Tribunal (Polish: Trybunał Główny Koronny) of the Crown of the Kingdom of Poland, established in 1578. The judges were elected from local nobles furthering nobility's Golden Liberty. The Tribunal ceased to exist after the Third Partition of Poland-Lithuania in 1795. The Palace of the Lithuanian Tribunal was demolished in December 1836 – April 1837.

== Establishment ==
After the legal reforms of 1563–64, members of the Lithuanian nobility received the right to appeal to the Grand Duke. However, soon Grand Duke's court was severely backlogged and became clear that reforms were needed. The nobles themselves demanded a "supreme court". The Tribunal was officially established on March 1, 1581; its first session was held on April 30, 1582. In effect, the reform established separation of powers in the state: Grand Duke was the executive branch, Seimas was the legislative, and the Tribunal and lower courts were the judicial.

== Proceedings ==
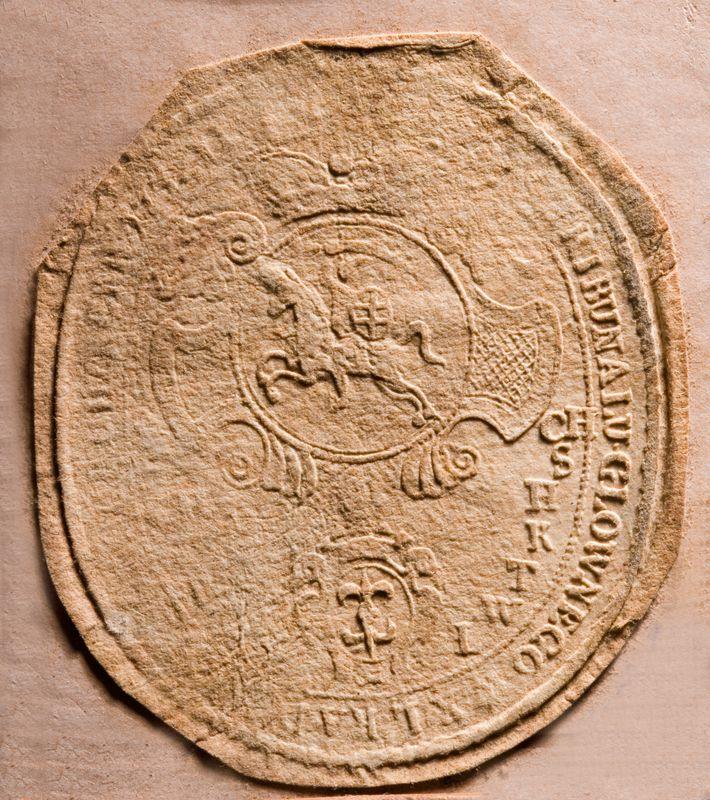
Seal of the tribunal

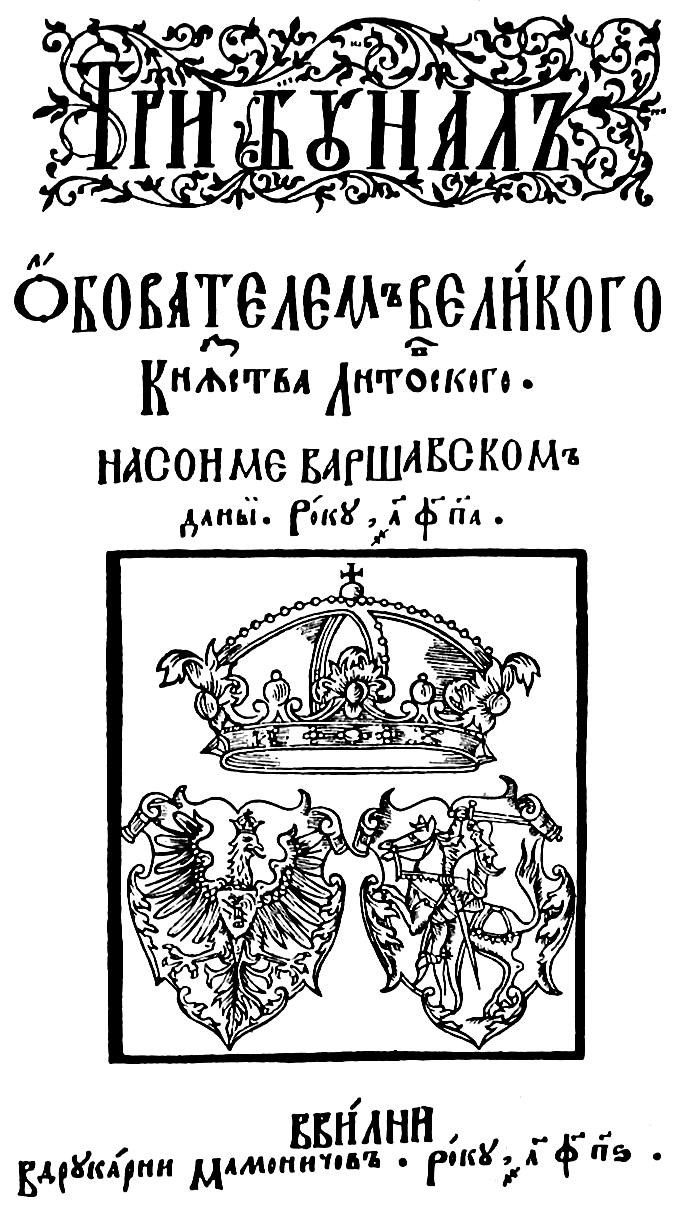
Book of the Tribunal, 1586

The Tribunal Charter had 20 articles governing its proceedings. The unpaid judges were elected in local nobility gatherings (sejmiks) for a one-year term around February 2. Initially, the judges could be reelected only after two years, but in 1611 that was changed to four years. No special legal education or knowledge was required. Each voivodeship and powiat provided two people for a total of 42–49 judges. The cases were decided by a simple majority. The Tribunal had jurisdiction over the nobility of the Grand Duchy of Lithuania (Duchy of Samogitia, which had the privilege to establish its own tribunal, opted to join the Lithuanian Tribunal in 1588). It could not decide cases involving peasants, city residents, clergy, or Jews. The Tribunal accepted civil and criminal cases. Later its competency was expanded to include military and tax appeals and cases involving misconduct of lower-tier courts.

The Tribunal met four, later twice a year first in Vilnius in the Cathedral Square, but later the location was alternated between Minsk and Navahrudak. The alternating location disrupted the court's work as personnel, documents, and archives had to be moved frequently. The sessions usually lasted about five months.

The Tribunal did not have an institution that could enforce its decisions. It delegated the enforcement to lower-tier courts. Therefore, despite penalties and other punishments for disobeying its decisions, the Tribunal had little actual power and the nobles increasingly ignored it.
