= Konstanty Kazimierz Brzostowski =

Polish noble, count of the Holy See and papal prelate

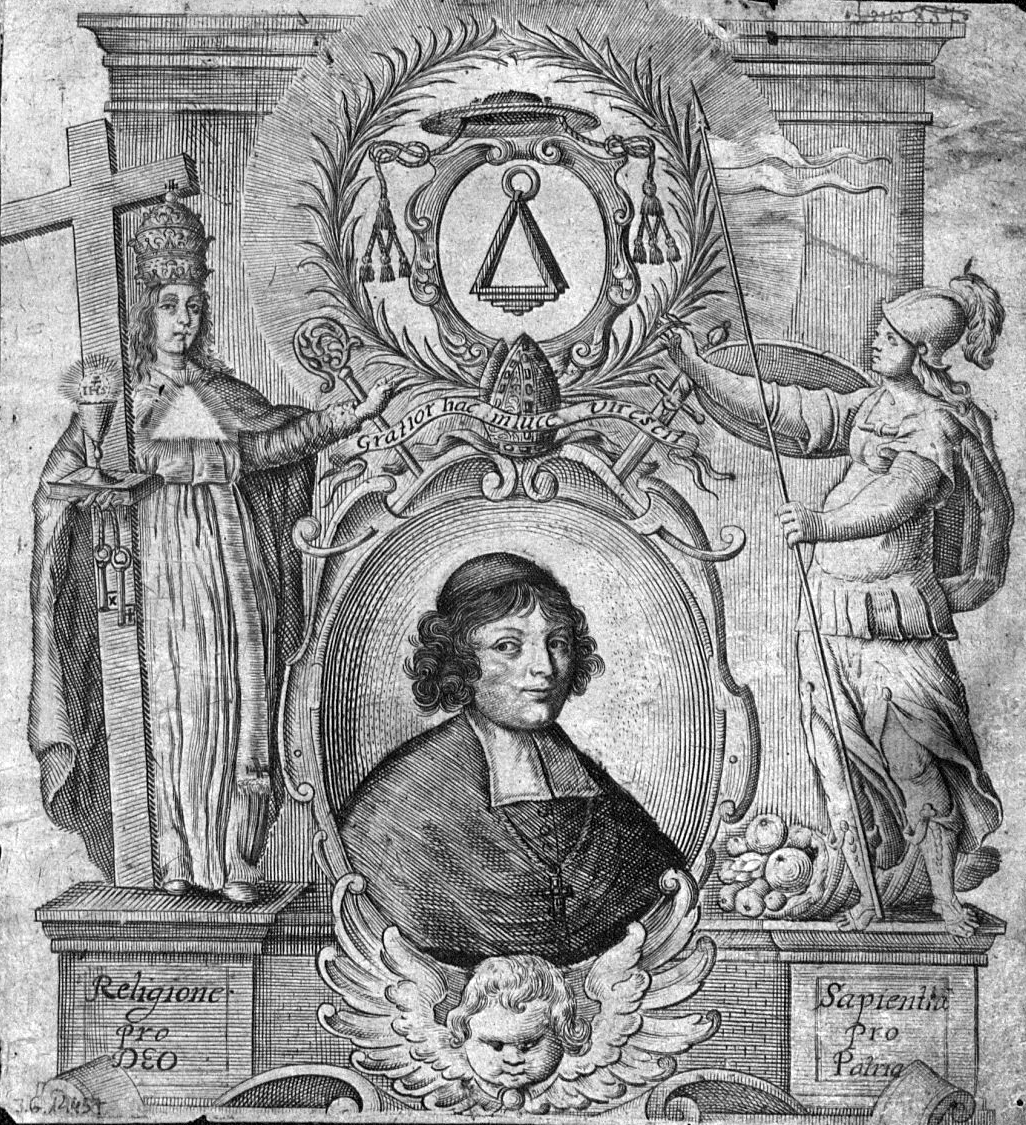

Konstanty Kazimierz Brzostowski (1644–1722) was a noble of the Grand Duchy of Lithuania, count of the Holy See, and papal prelate. He was Grand Secretary of Lithuania from 1671, and shortly thereafter was Grand Writer of Lithuania. He was bishop of Smoleńsk from 1685 to 1687 and bishop of Vilnius from 1687.

Konstanty studied at the Vilnius ecclesiastical seminary and in Rome (1657–1659). He became a member of the Vilnius Chapter in 1669.

In 1689, Konstanty was one of the judges who sentenced Kazimierz Łyszczyński to death for atheism. Brzostowski was a political opponent of the Sapieha family and excommunicated the Grand Hetman of Lithuania Kazimierz Jan Sapieha in 1694 and again in 1709. He unsuccessfully tried to make Peter I of Russia adopt more tolerant policies towards the followers of Union of Brest.

Konstanty Brzostowski was known as "the quarrelsome bishop".
