= Postal codes in Lithuania =

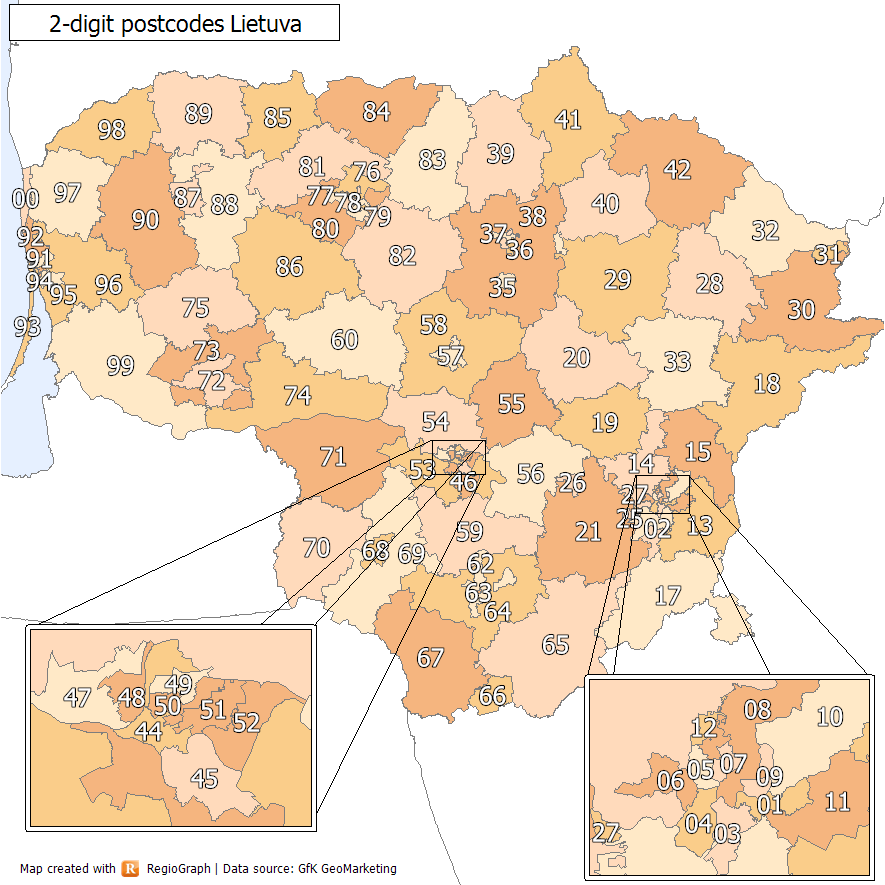
2-digit postcode areas Lithuania (defined through the first two postcode digits)

Postal codes in Lithuania since 2005 are 5 digit numeric, ISO 3166-1 alpha-2 prefix is allowed, with that the format is LT-NNNNN. Currently, Lithuania has a total of 16,514 postal codes.

Prior to 2005, it was NNNN, which was the old Soviet NNNNNN format with the first 2 digits (23) dropped.

The standardized format for postal codes was established by Lietuvos paštas, the Lithuanian state postal company, following the guidelines of the Universal Postal Union (UPU). The 5 digits are divided as follows: the first two refer to the routing district and the last three to the delivery office. Within the country, only the five-digit postal code is applied. For example, "14116". In the case of international mail, the prefix "LT-" is mandatory as the country code, according to ISO 3166-1 alpha-2 conventions. An example, for sending to Lithuania, would be "LT-01103".

== See also ==
- ISO 3166-2:LT
- Subdivisions of Lithuania
- lt:Pašto kodas
