= Jan Sapieha =

Jan Sapieha may refer to:

- Iwan Semenowicz Sapieha or Jan Sapieha (c. 1431-1517), progenitor of the Kodeń line of the Sapieha family
- Jan Piotr Sapieha (1569–1611), Polish-Lithuanian nobleman, father of Paweł Jan Sapieha
- Jan Stanisław Sapieha (1589–1635), Chancellor of Lithuania, 1621–1635
- Jan Kazimierz Sapieha the Younger (1637–1720/1642–1720), Duke from 1700, voivode of Wilno, from 1682 Grand Hetman of Lithuania
- Jan Kazimierz Sapieha the Elder (died 1730), Grand Hetman of Lithuania
- Jan Fryderyk Sapieha (1680–1751), Grand Recorder of Lithuania, 1706–1709; from 1716 castellan of Troki; from 1735 Grand Chancellor of Lithuania

== See also ==
- Paweł Jan Sapieha (1609–1665/1610–1665), father of Jan Kazimierz the Younger, voivod of Wilno, from 1656 Grand Hetman of Lithuania
- Kazimierz Sapieha (disambiguation)
