= Sabutis =

Sabutis is the masculine form of a Lithuanian family name. Its feminine forms are: Sabutienė (married woman or widow) and Sabutytė (unmarried woman).

Notable persons with the name Sabutis include:

- Eugenijus Sabutis (born 1975) Lithuanian politician, since 2016 Mayor of Jonava
- Liudvikas Sabutis (born 1939), Lithuanian politician
- Mindaugas Sabutis (born 1975), Lithuanian prelate, current Primate of the Evangelical Lutheran Church in Lithuania
