= Church of Saints Philip and James, Vilnius =

Church in Vilnius, Lithuania

Church of St. Philip and St. Jacob Šv. apaštalų Pilypo ir Jokūbo bažnyčia
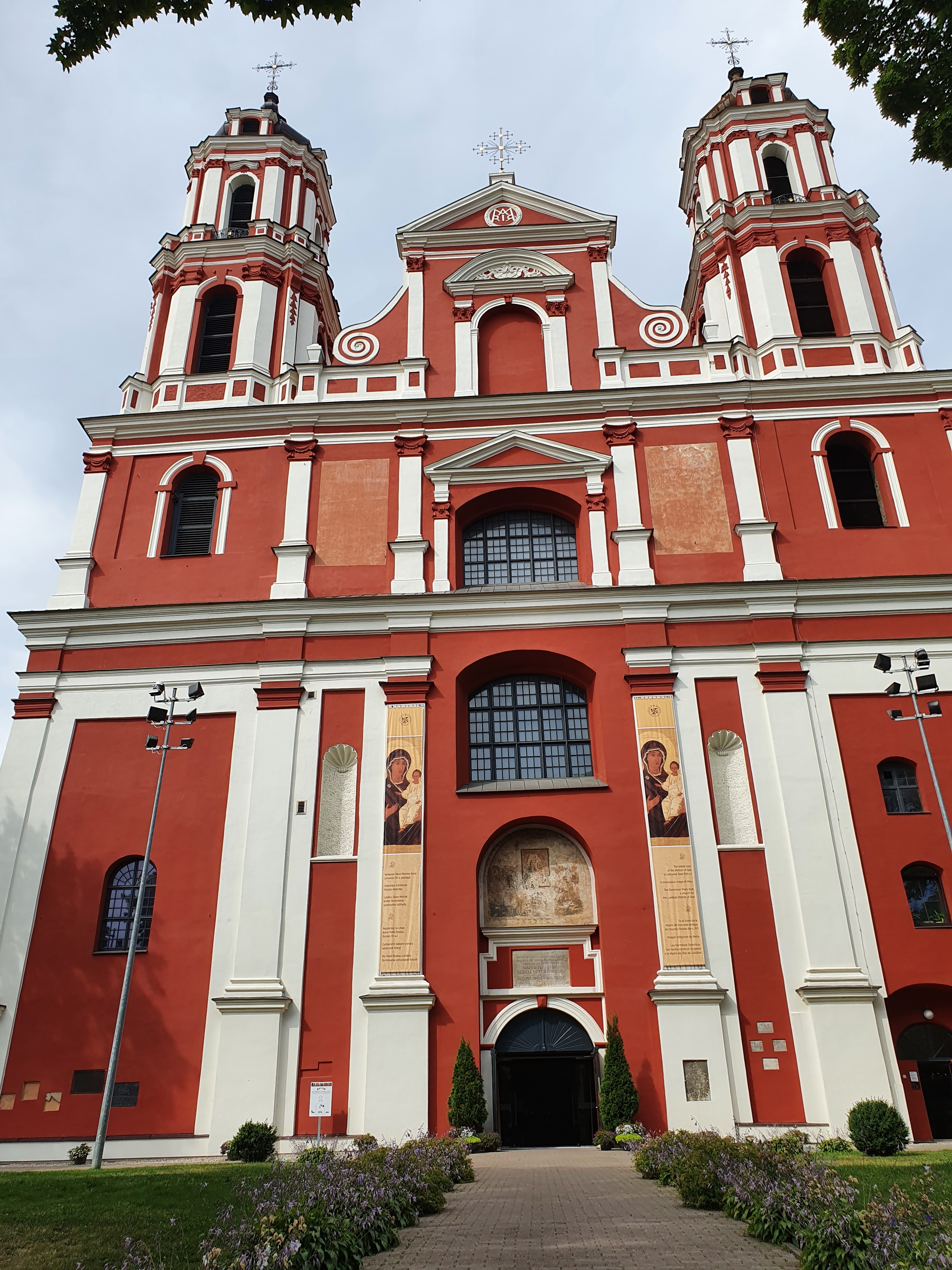
- Main façade of St. Philip and St. Jacob's

Religion
- Affiliation: Roman Catholic
- Diocese: Old Town

Location
- Location: Vilnius, Lithuania
- Interactive map of Church of St. Philip and St. Jacob; Šv. apaštalų Pilypo ir Jokūbo bažnyčia
- Coordinates: 54°41′26.50″N 25°16′20″E

Architecture
- Type: Church
- Style: Baroque
- Completed: 1722
- Materials: plastered masonry

Website
- dominikonai.lt

Church of Saints Philip and James (Lithuanian: Šv. apaštalų Pilypo ir Jokūbo bažnyčia, Polish: Kościół św. Jakuba i Filipa) is a Roman Catholic church in Vilnius' Old Town, near the Lukiškės Square. It is famous for the Mother of God of Lukiškės painting.

In 1690, the cornerstone was laid for a new brick church dedicated to the Holy Apostles Philip and James in Vilnius. According to the chronicle of the Dominican province, the construction was financed primarily through donations from the faithful and pilgrims. Among the notable benefactors mentioned were Kazimierz Sapieha, the Grand Hetman of the Grand Duchy of Lithuania and Antoni Karol Nowosielski, the Quartermaster of the Grand Duchy of Lithuania. The identity of Nowosielski and the offices he held are confirmed by contemporary historical scholarship.

== Photos ==
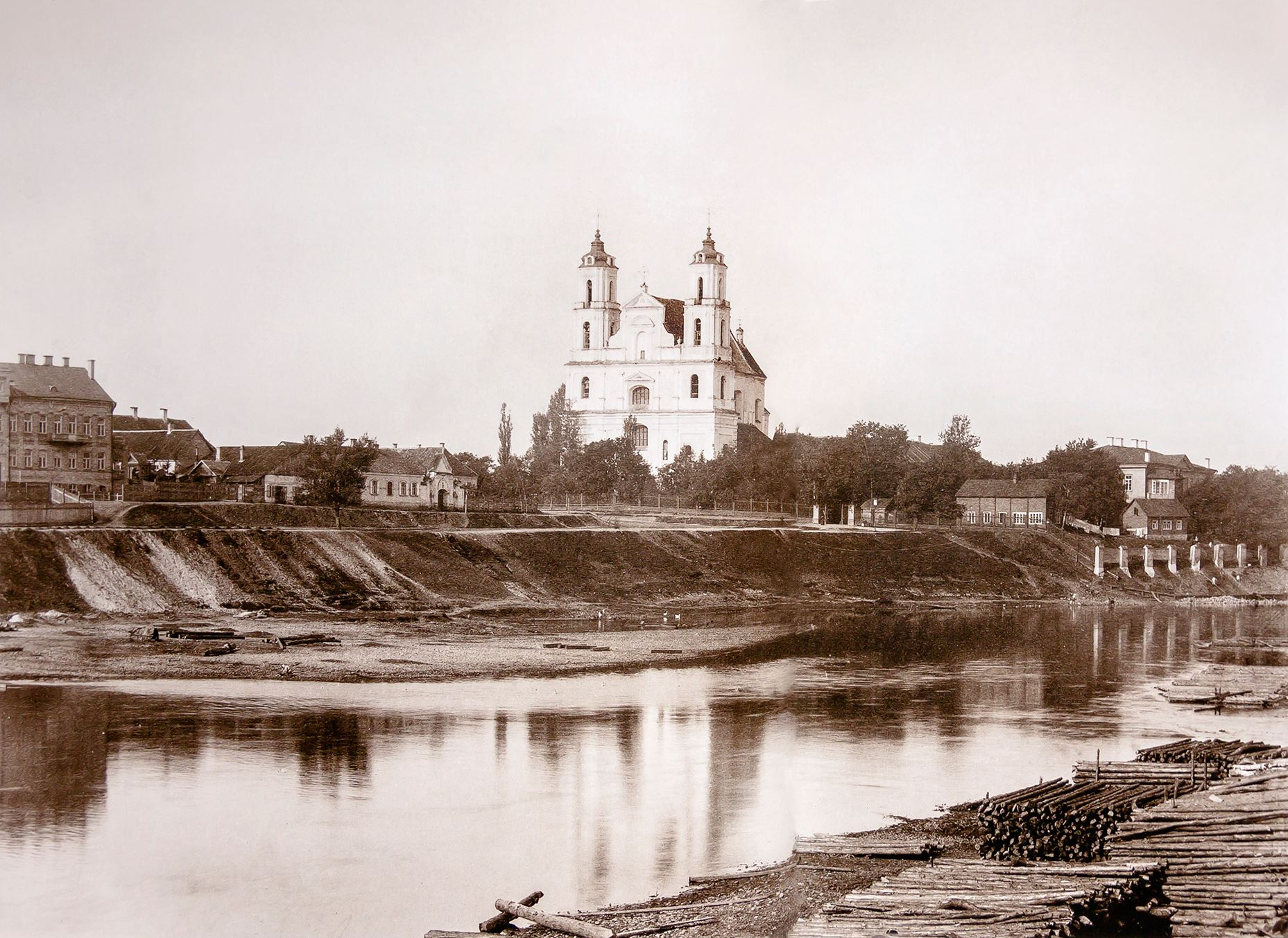
Photograph of the church (view from Kalvarijų g. side, around 1896)

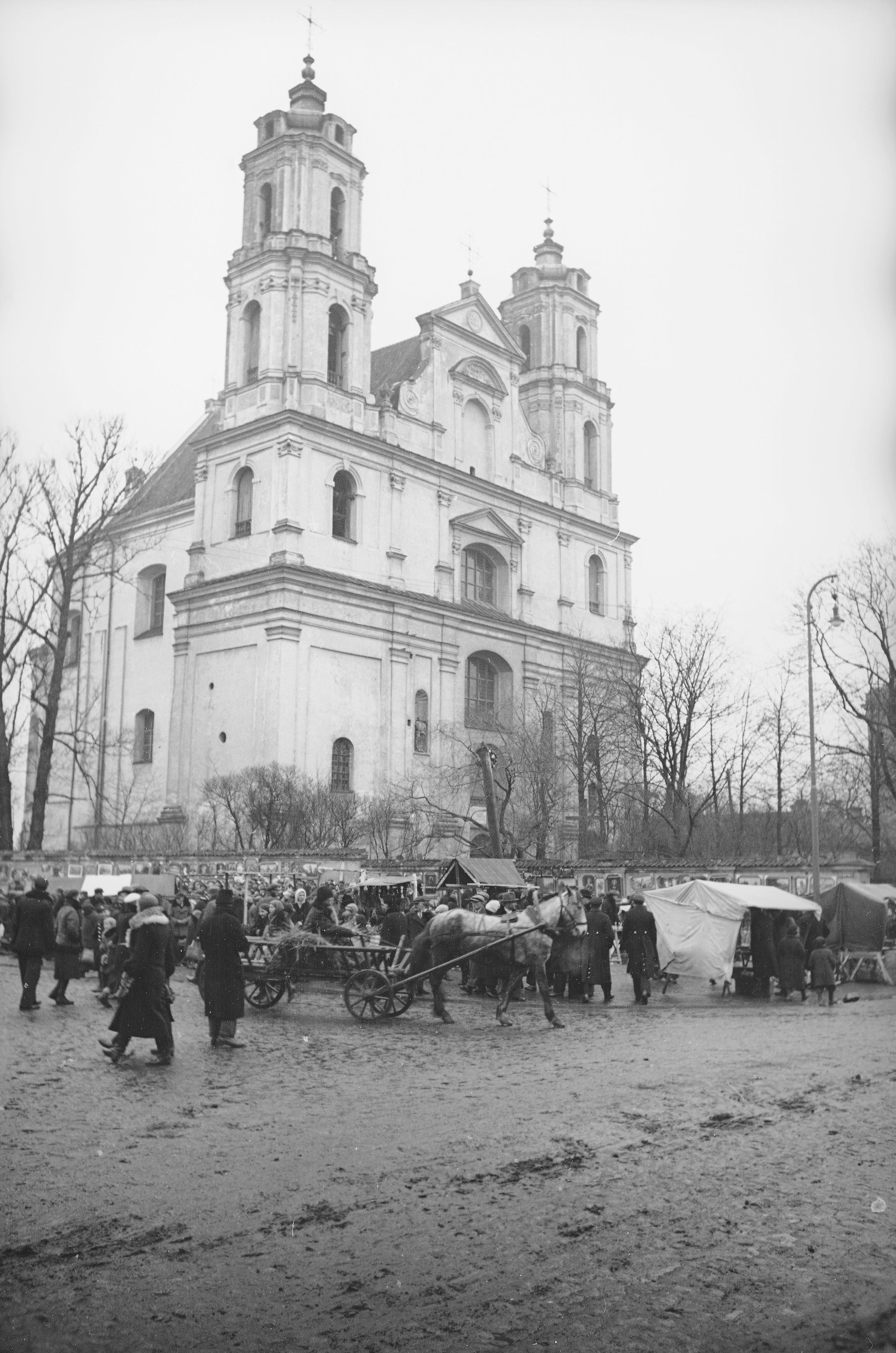
The church in 1939

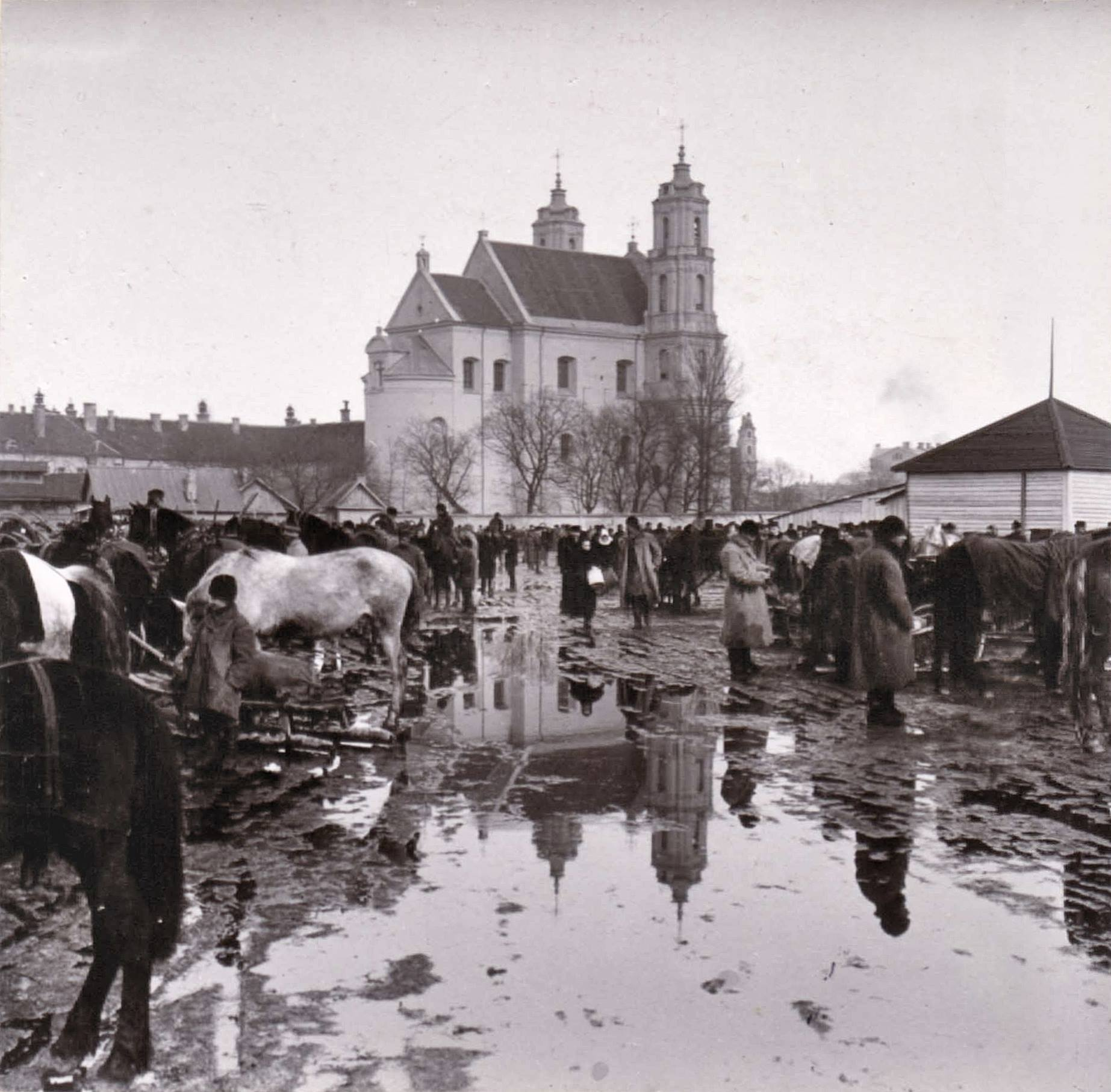
Market in Lukiškės Square

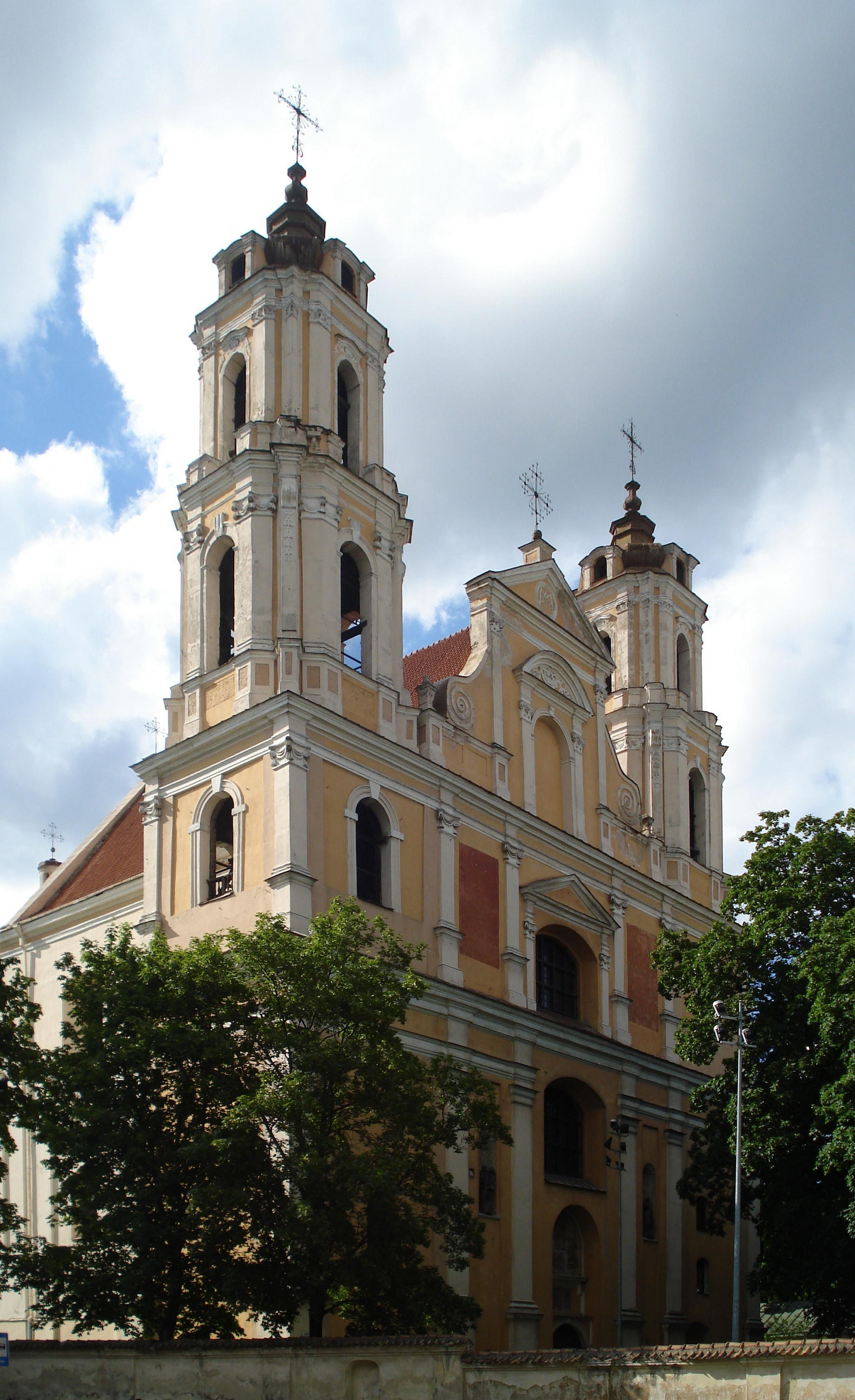
The Church in 2007

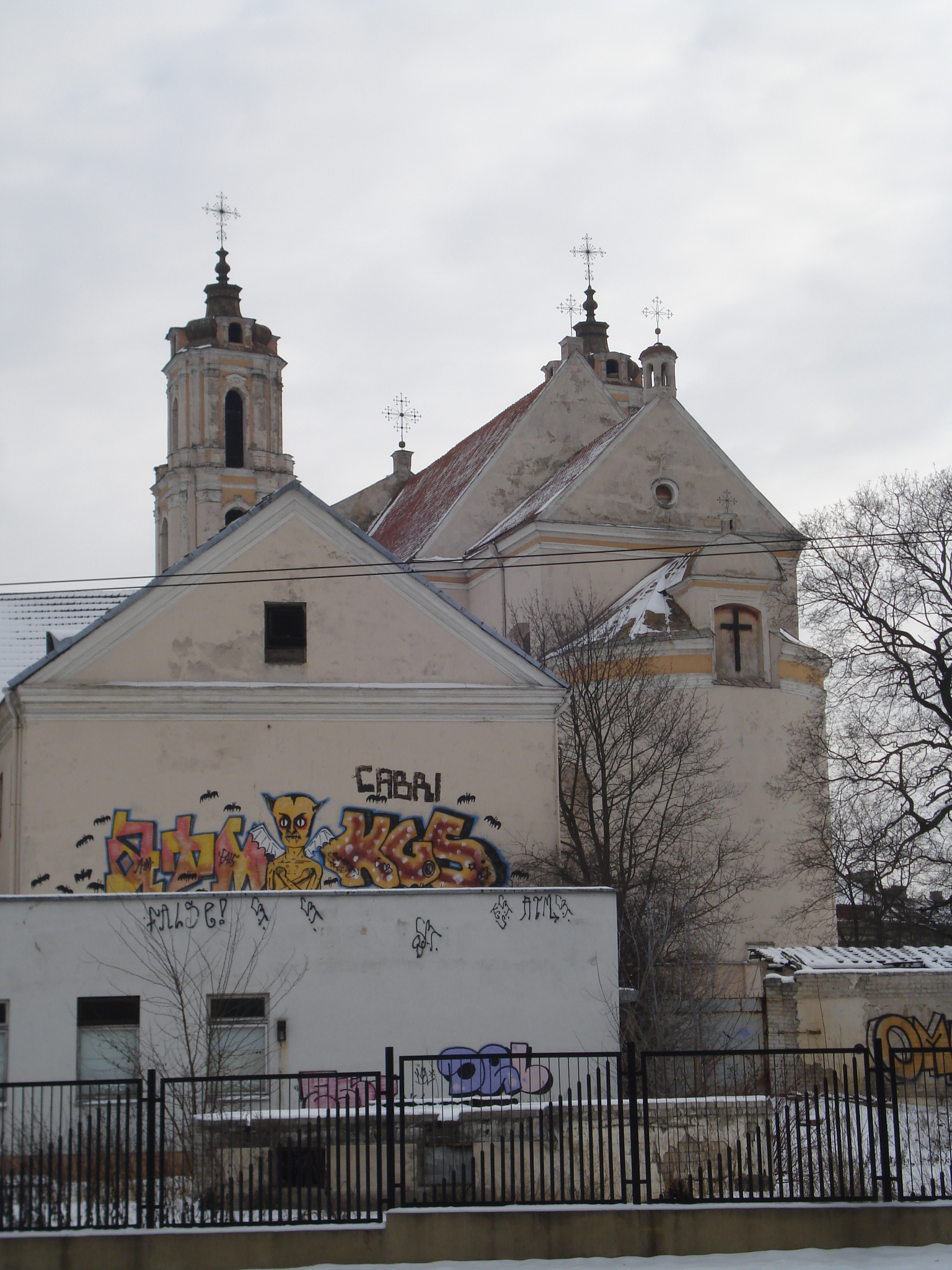
West facade (2008)

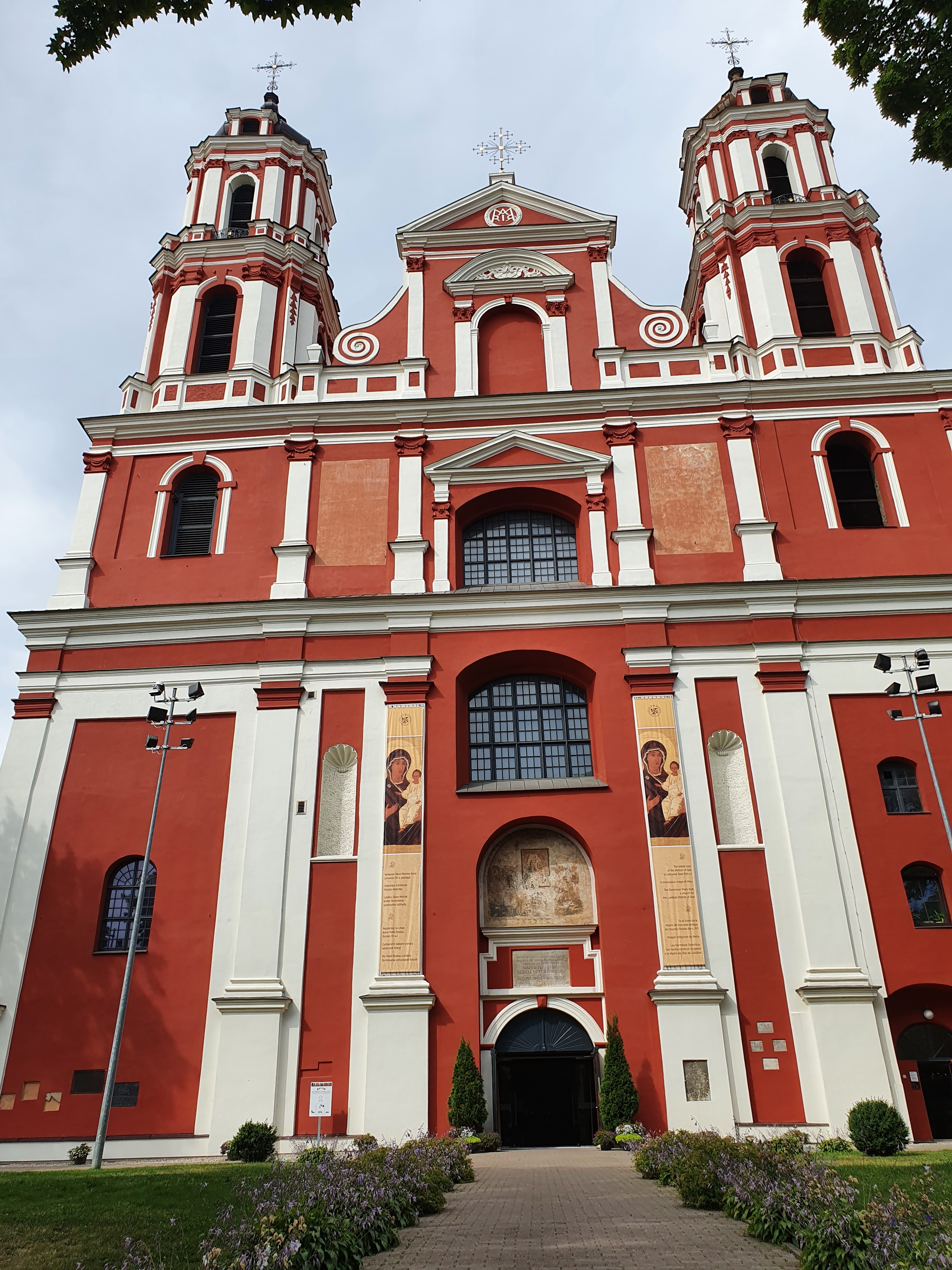
Renovated church facade

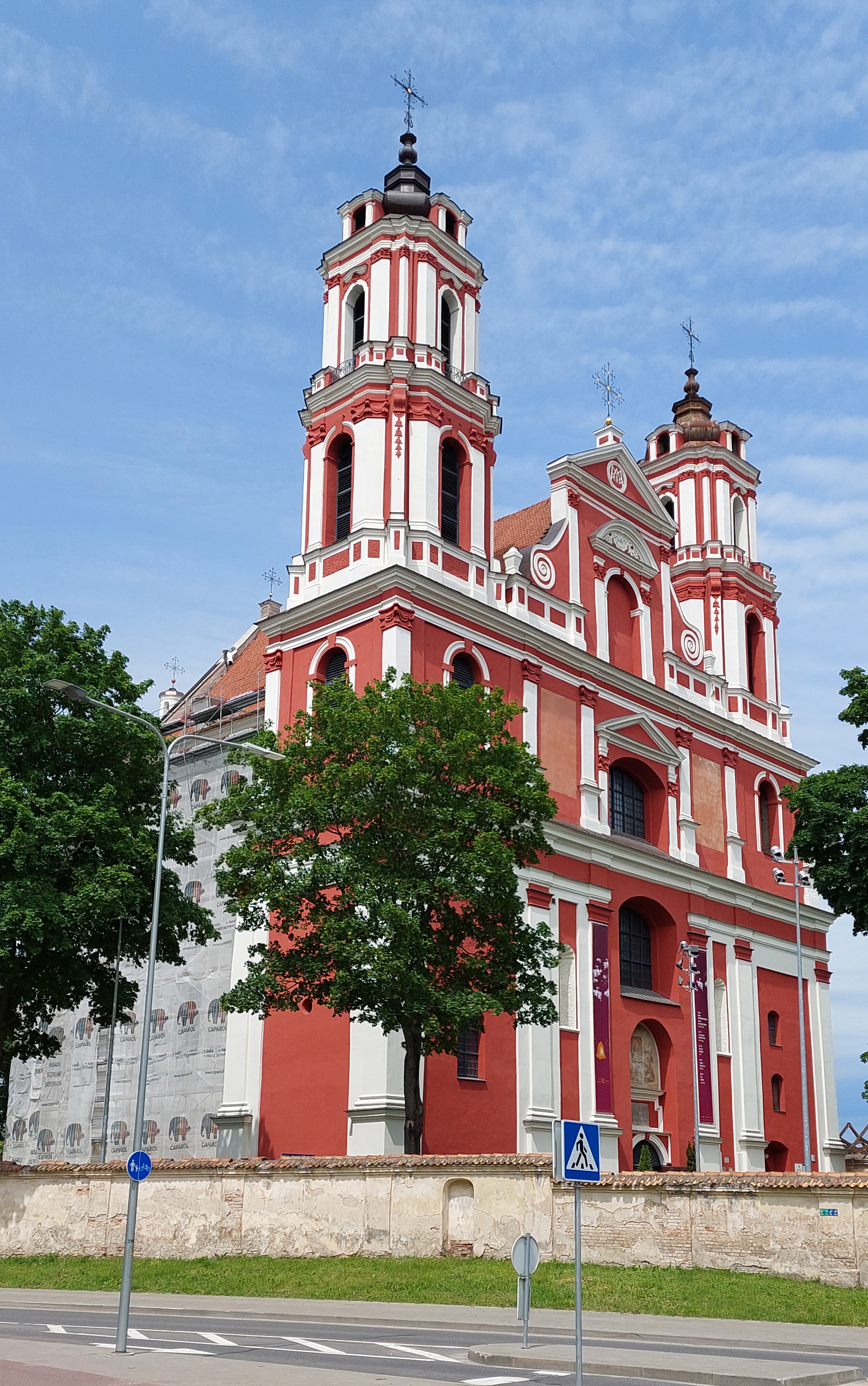
In 2022

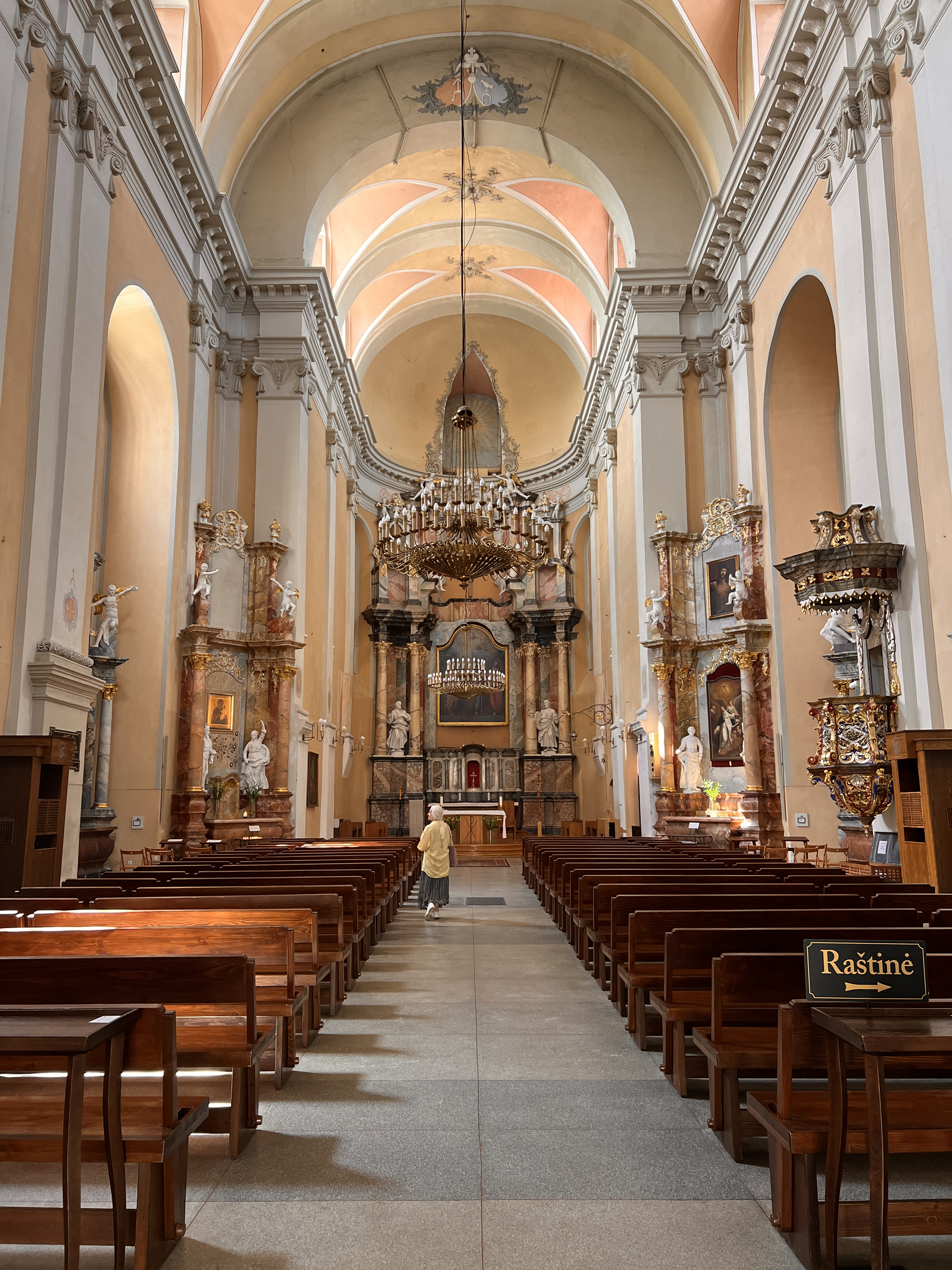
Interior view
