= Vilnius Old Town =

UNESCO World Heritage Site in Vilnius, Lithuania

Vilnius Historic Centre
UNESCO World Heritage Site
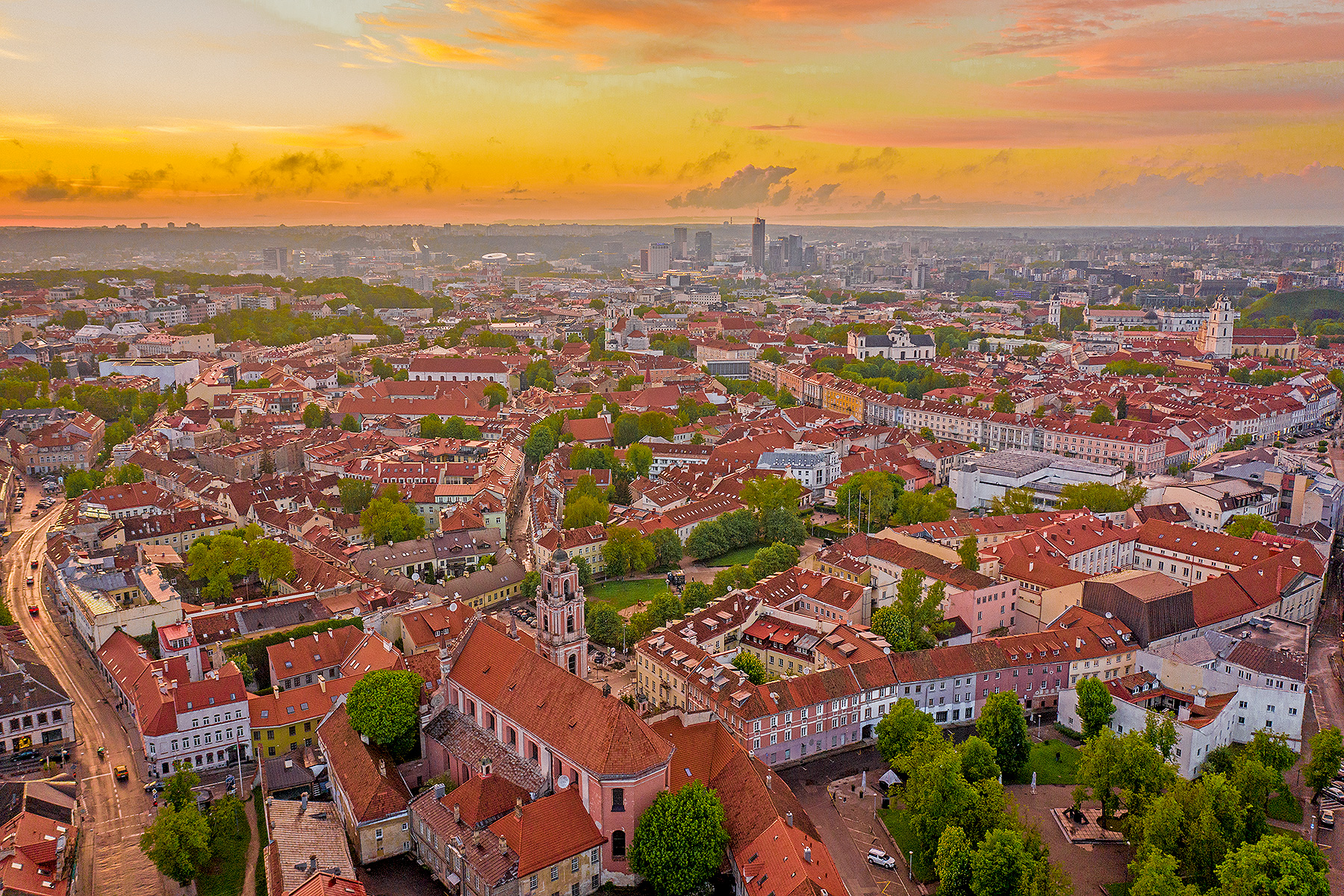
- Panorama of Vilnius Old Town

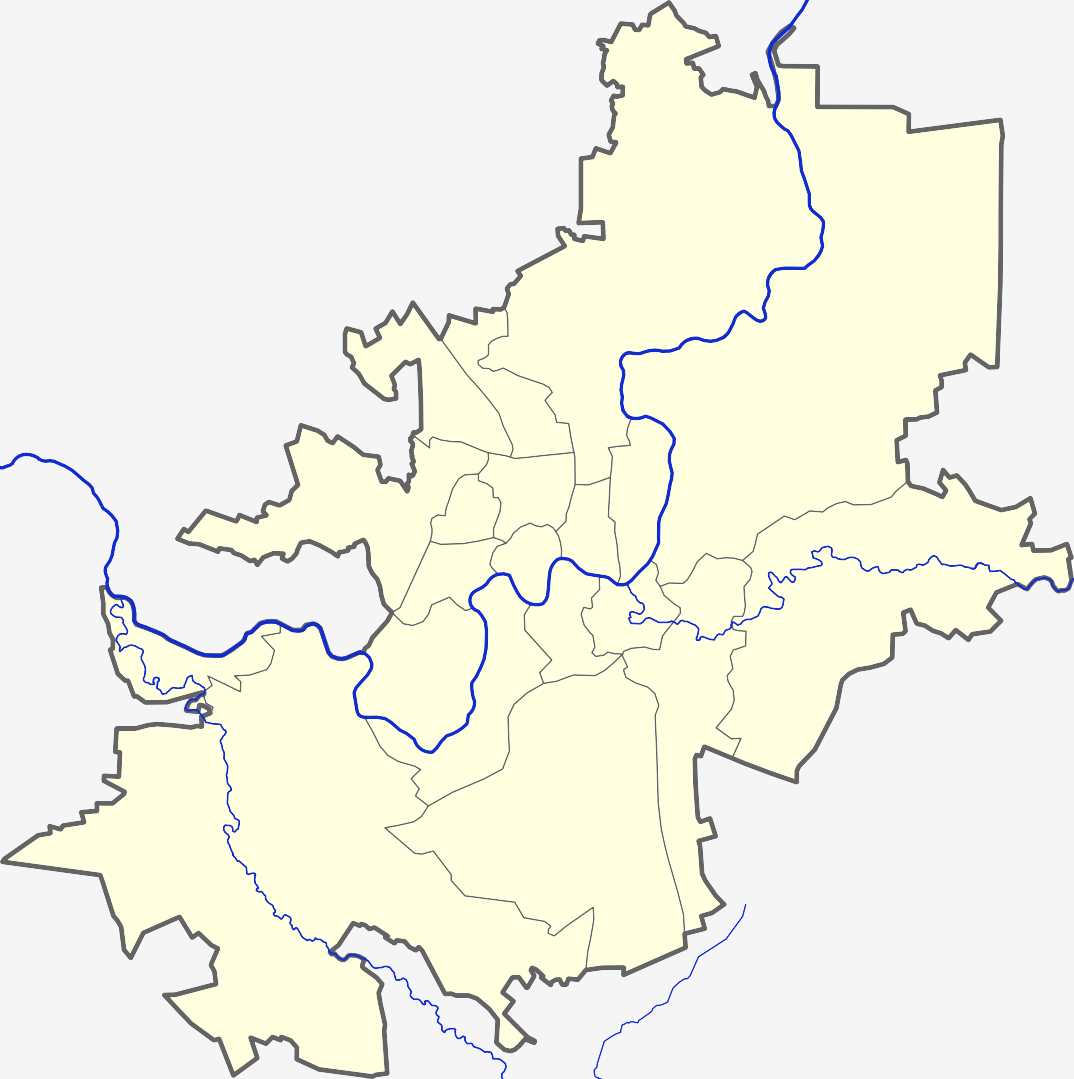
- Location within Vilnius Location within Lithuania
- Location: Vilnius, Vilnius County, Lithuania
- Criteria: Cultural: (ii), (iv)
- Reference: 541bis
- Inscription: 1994 (18th Session)
- Extensions: 2012
- Area: 352.09 ha (870.0 acres)
- Buffer zone: 1,912.24 ha (4,725.2 acres)
- Coordinates: 54°41′12″N 25°17′35″E

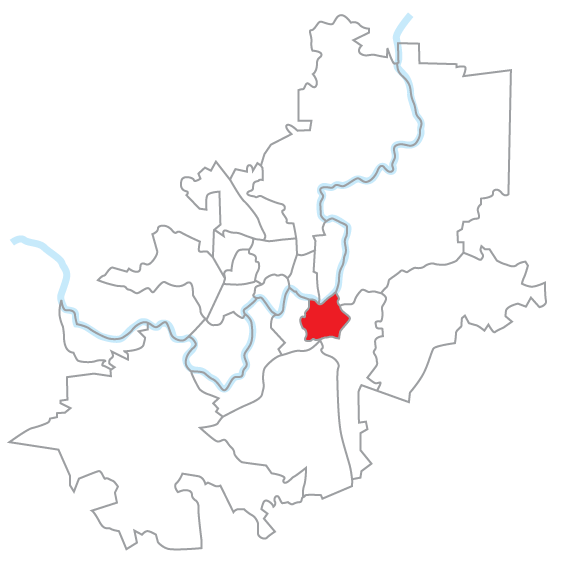
Location of Senamiestis Eldership

The Old Town of Vilnius (Lithuanian: Vilniaus senamiestis), one of the largest surviving medieval old towns in Northern Europe, as inscribed within UNESCO World Heritage Sites, has an area of 3.59 square kilometres (887 acres). It encompasses 74 quarters, with 70 streets and lanes numbering 1487 buildings with a total floor area of 1,497,000 square meters. The administrative division of the Old Town (senamiesčio seniūnija) is a larger territory and comprises more than 4.5 square kilometres. It was founded by the Lithuanian Grand Duke and King of Poland Jogaila in 1387 on the Magdeburg rights the oldest part of the Lithuanian capital of Vilnius, it had been developed over the course of many centuries, and has been shaped by the city's history and a constantly changing cultural influence. It is a place where some of Europe's greatest architectural styles—gothic, renaissance, baroque and neoclassical—stand side by side and complement each other. There are many Catholic, Lutheran and Orthodox churches, residential houses, cultural and architectural monuments, museums in the Old Town.

Pilies Street is the Old Town's main artery and the hub of cafe and street market life. The main street of Vilnius, Gediminas Avenue, is partially located in the Old Town. The central squares in the Old Town are the Cathedral Square and the Town Hall Square.

One of the most elaborate architectural complexes is the Vilnius University Architectural Ensemble, which occupies a large part of the Old Town and has 13 courtyards. It was selected to represent Lithuania in the Mini-Europe Park in Brussels.

In 1994 the Vilnius Old Town was included as a UNESCO World Heritage Site (No. 541) in recognition of its universal value and originality. It has been recognised as one of the most beautiful cities of the Old Continent that also has the largest baroque Old Town in the whole of Eastern and Central Europe. The definition of "historic center" itself has a broader meaning than the Old Town, formerly encircled with defensive walls. It embraces the valuable historical suburbs of Vilnius, such as Užupis, which historically used to be outside the city boundaries. Therefore Užupis is often considered a part of the Old Town of Vilnius.

352 ha Vilnius Old Town (Senamiestis) as the UNESCO World Heritage Site should not be confused with one of 21 elderships (boroughs) of Vilnius – Senamiestis (the one with a slightly larger territory – 450 ha).

== Landmarks ==
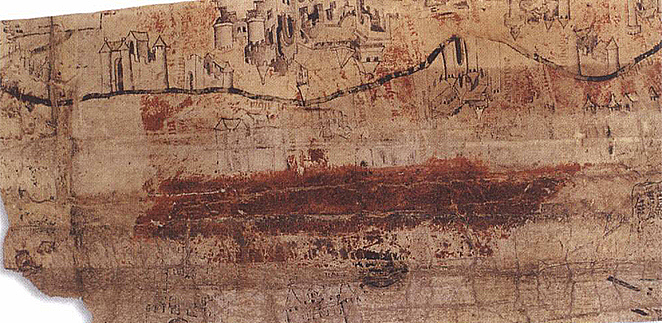
Portion of map, which depicts the oldest known image of Lithuanian capital Vilnius (14th century), the “Bohemian road-map”.

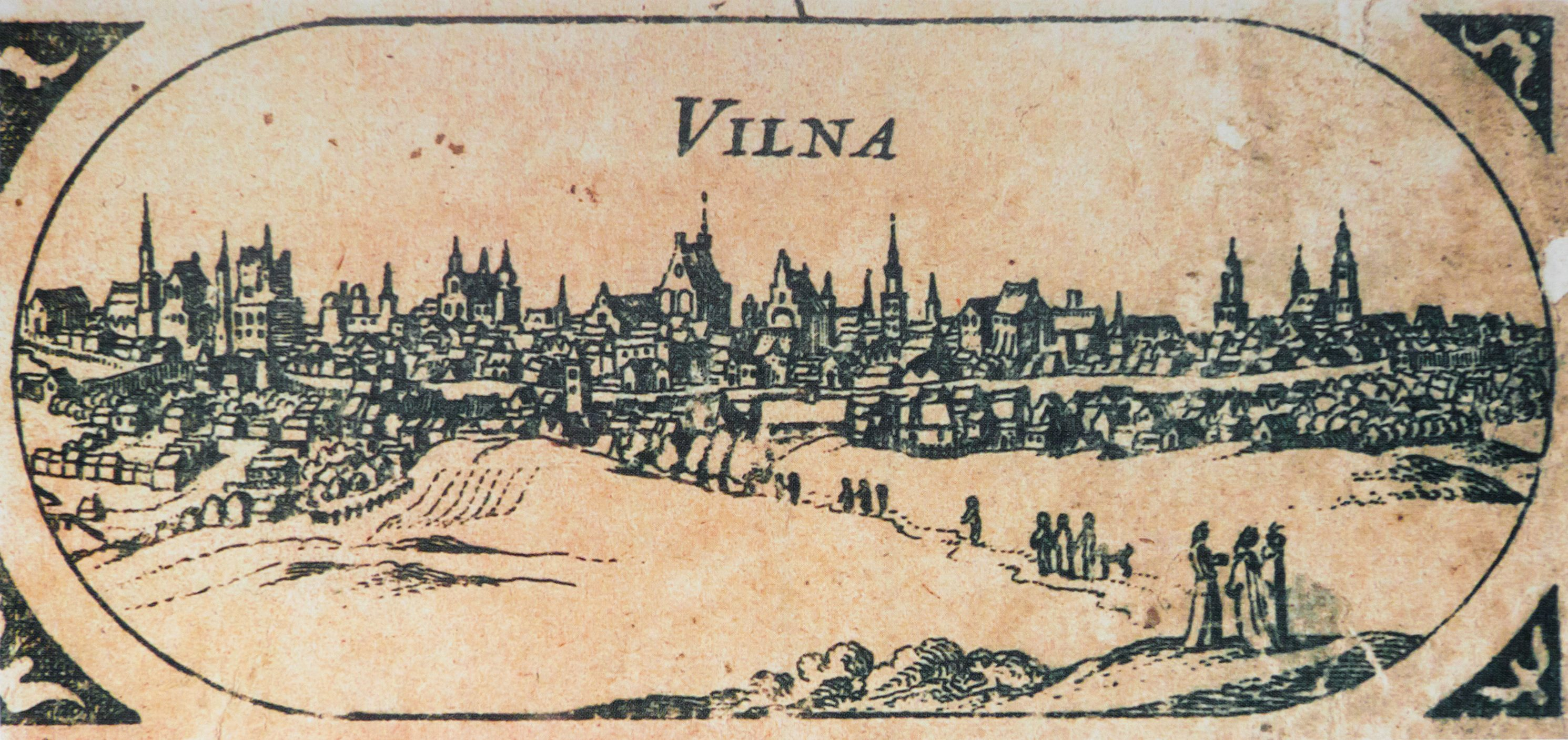
Panorama of Vilnius in the 17th century.

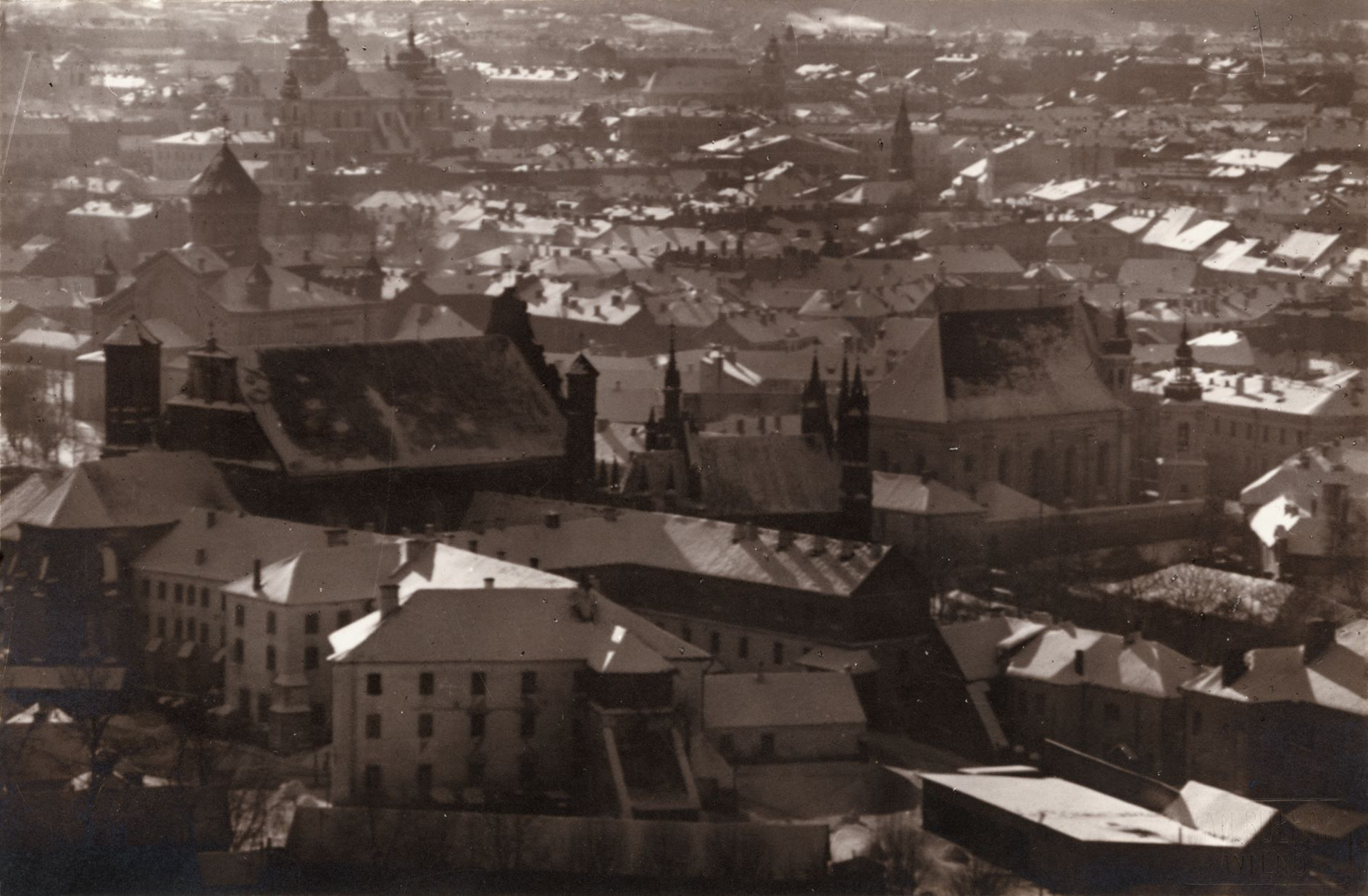
Old Town Vilnius in 1919

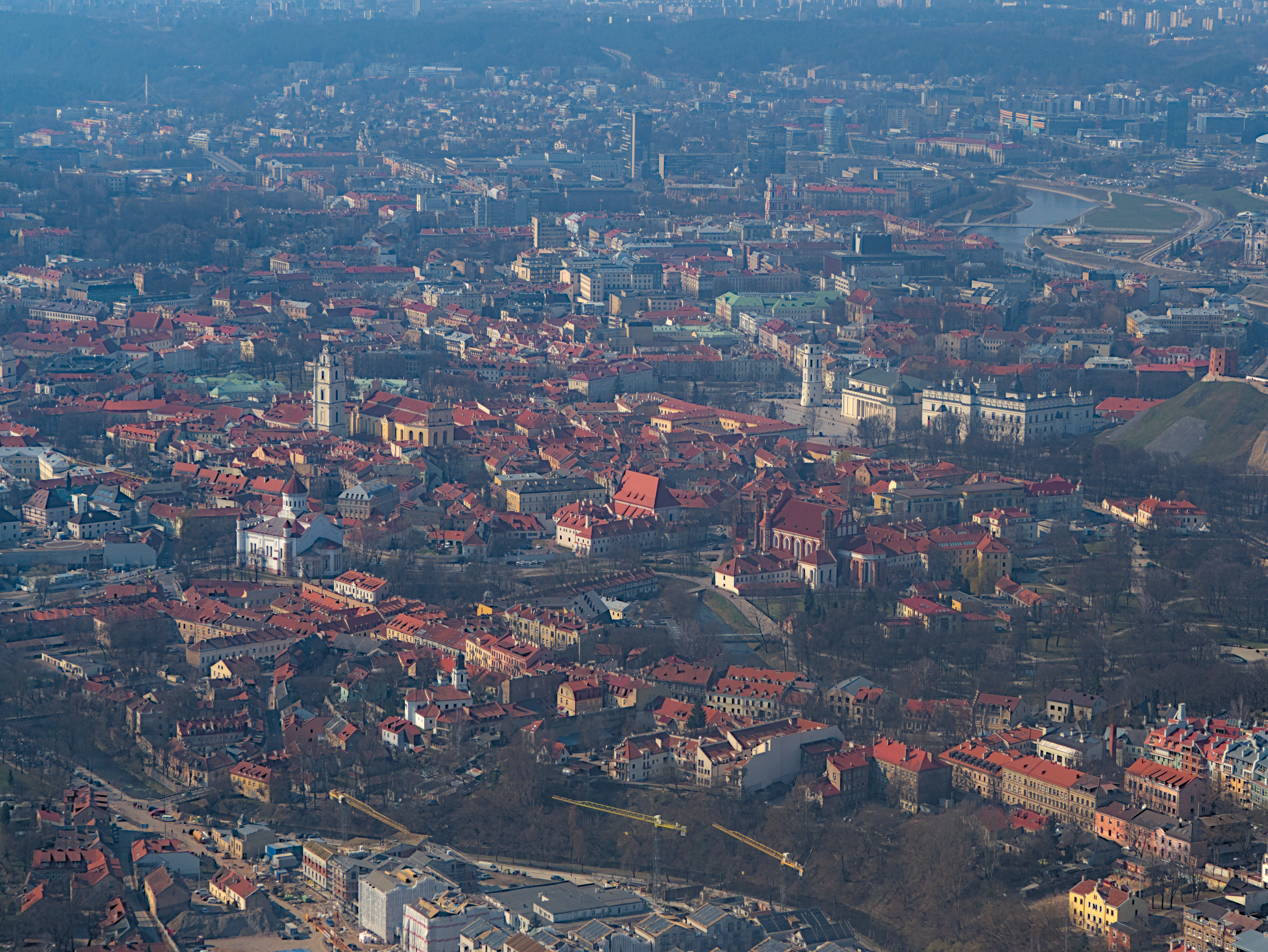
Aerial photo of the Old Town in 2018

There are more monuments of interest in the Old Town than in any other part of Vilnius; they include:

=== Palaces ===
- Presidential Palace
- Slushko Palace
- Radvilas Palace
- Tyzenhaus Palace
- Vilnius Castle Complex with the Gediminas Tower and Royal Palace

=== Religious monuments ===
- St. Anne's Church
- Church of St. Francis and St. Bernard
- St. Michael the Archangel Church
- Church of St. Johns
- Church of St. Casimir
- Vilnius Cathedral in Cathedral Square
- St. Nicholas Church
- All Saints Church
- Church of St. Theresa
- Gate of Dawn
- Three Crosses
- Church of St. Catherine
- Church of St. Philip and St. Jacob
- Orthodox Church of the Holy Spirit
- Monastery of the Holy Trinity
- Cathedral of the Theotokos
- St. Nicholas Church
- St. Paraskeva Church
- Evangelical Lutheran Church
- Dominican Church of the Holy Spirit

=== Other places of interest ===
- House of the Signatories
- National Museum of Lithuania
- Lithuanian National Drama Theatre
- Fragments of the Vilnius city wall
- Vilnius dungeons
- Vilnius University
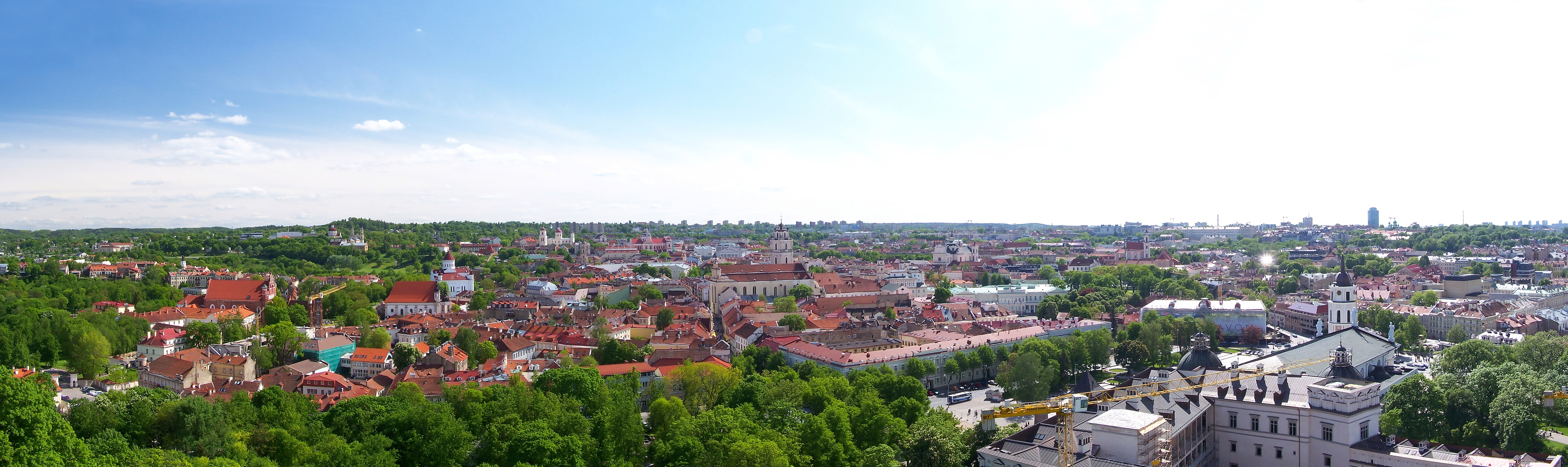
Panorama of the Vilnius Old Town, visible from atop the Gediminas Tower
