= Radvila Palace =

Radvilas Palace (Lithuanian: Radvilų rūmai, Polish: Pałac Radziwiłłów) is a Late Renaissance palace in the Old Town of Vilnius, Lithuania.

== History ==
Radvilas
- Radvilų rūmai
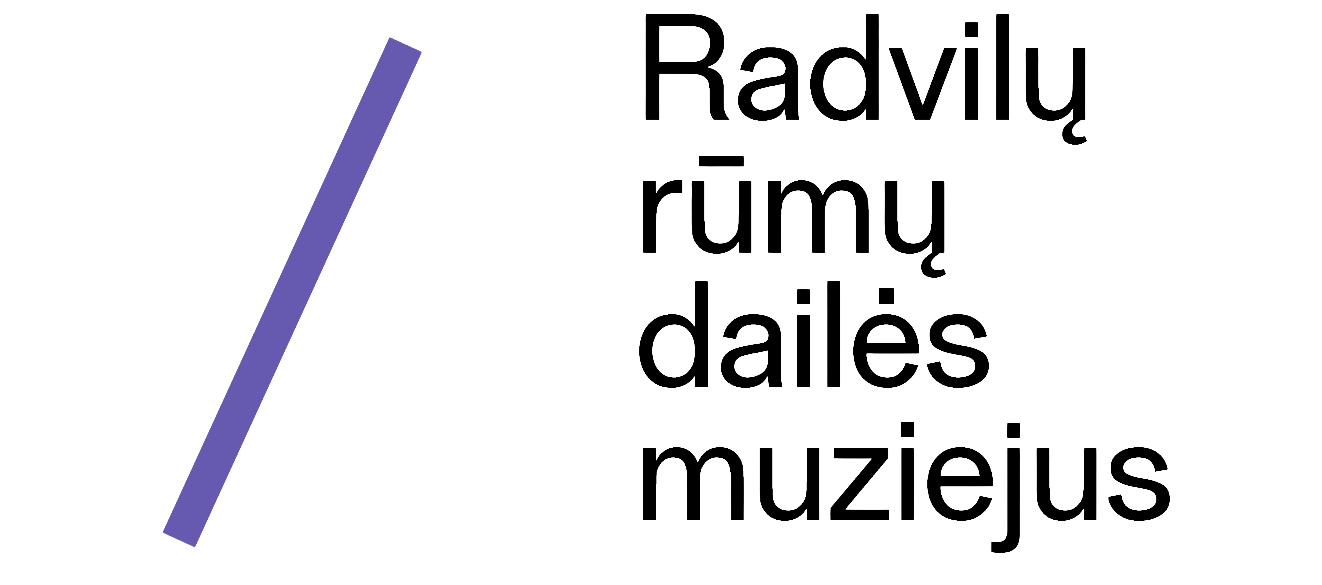

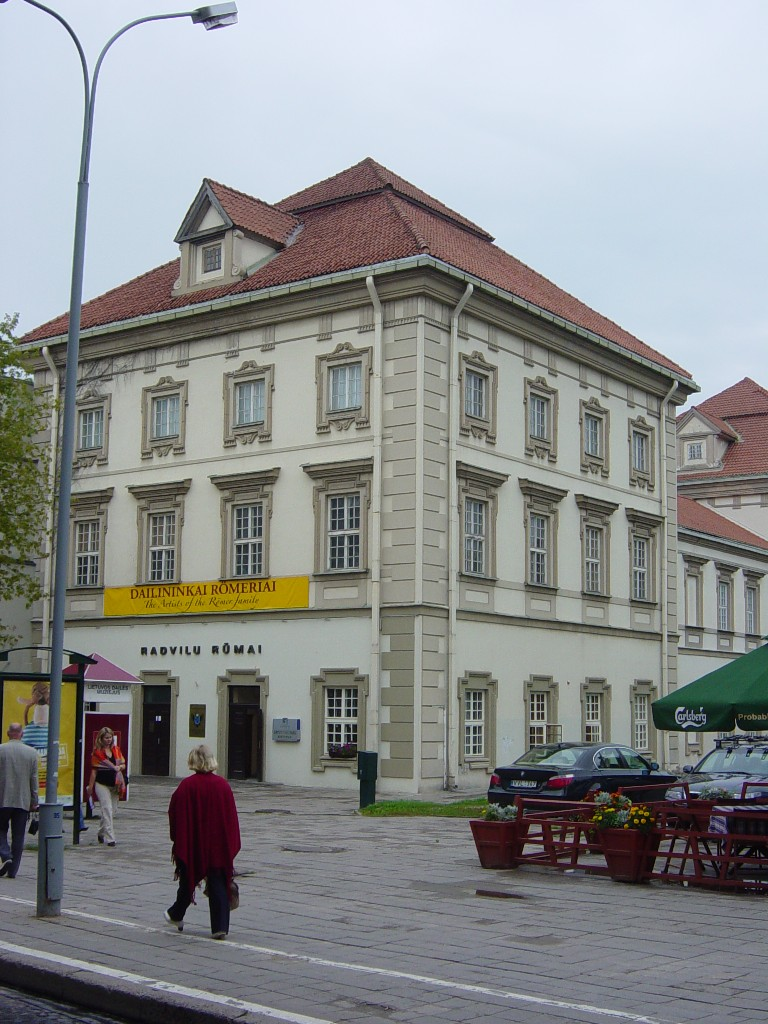
- The entrance to the palace

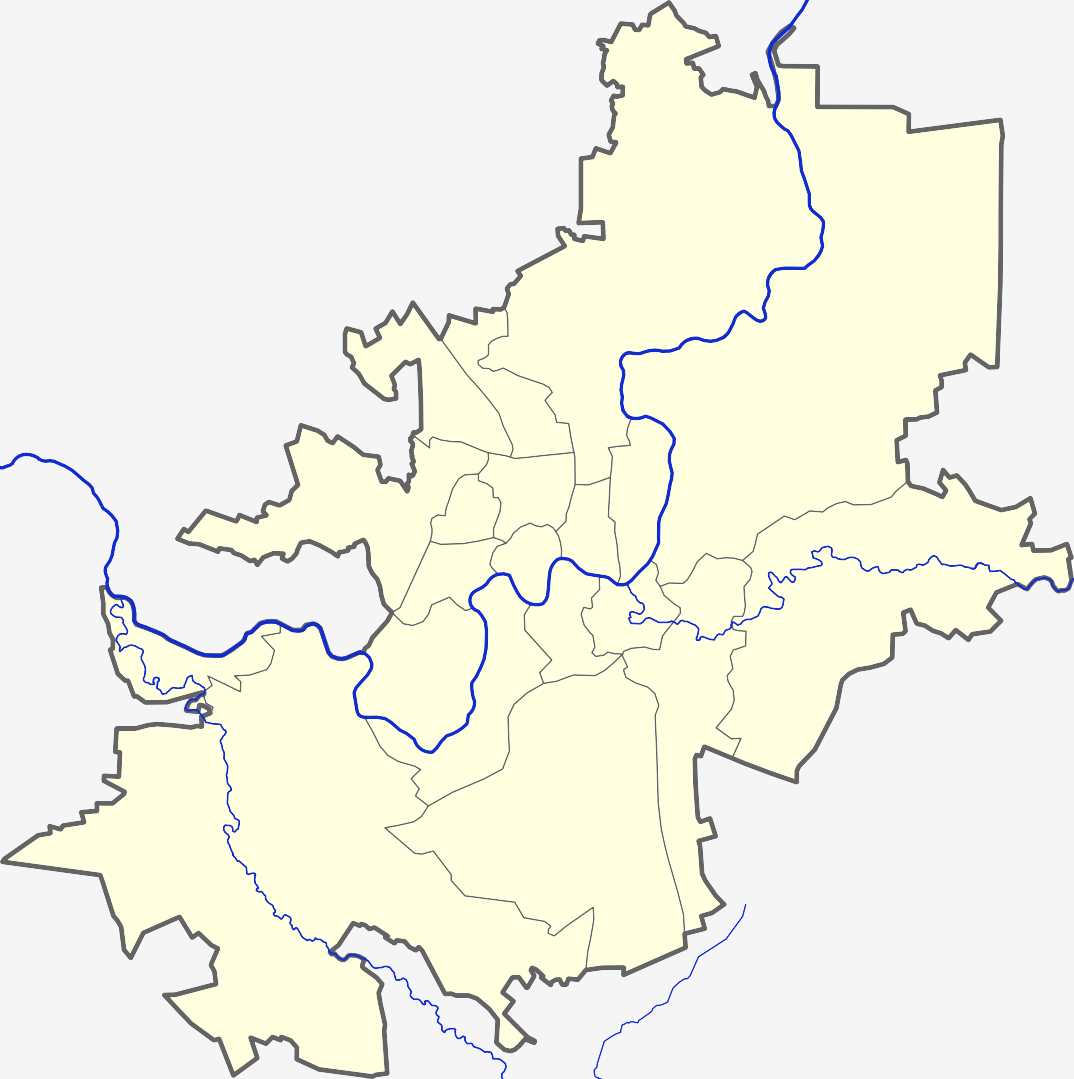
- Location within Vilnius

General information
- Location: Vilnius Old Town
- Coordinates: 54°41′2″N 25°16′49″E
- Construction started: 1635
- Construction stopped: 1653

UNESCO World Heritage Site
- Official name: Vilnius Old Town
- Type: Cultural
- Criteria: Cultural: (ii), (iv)
- Designated: 1994
- Reference no.: 541
- UNESCO region: Europe

It is likely that a wooden mansion of Mikołaj "the Black" Radziwiłł stood in the same site in the 16th century. The current building was constructed by the order of Janusz Radziwiłł from 1635 to 1653 according to the design of Jonas Ullrich. The building fell in ruin after the Muscovite invasion 1655–60 and remained mostly neglected for centuries. It was further devastated during World War I and only the northern wing of the palace survived. Eventually, it was restored in the 1980s and a division of the Lithuanian Art Museum is located there today. A part of the palace is still in need of renovation today. Currently, this branch of the Lithuanian National Art Museum contains Old Master paintings by Ludovico Lipparini, Giuseppe Rossi, Antonio Bellucci, Carlo Dolci, Giovanni Paolo Panini and Bartholomeus Spranger.

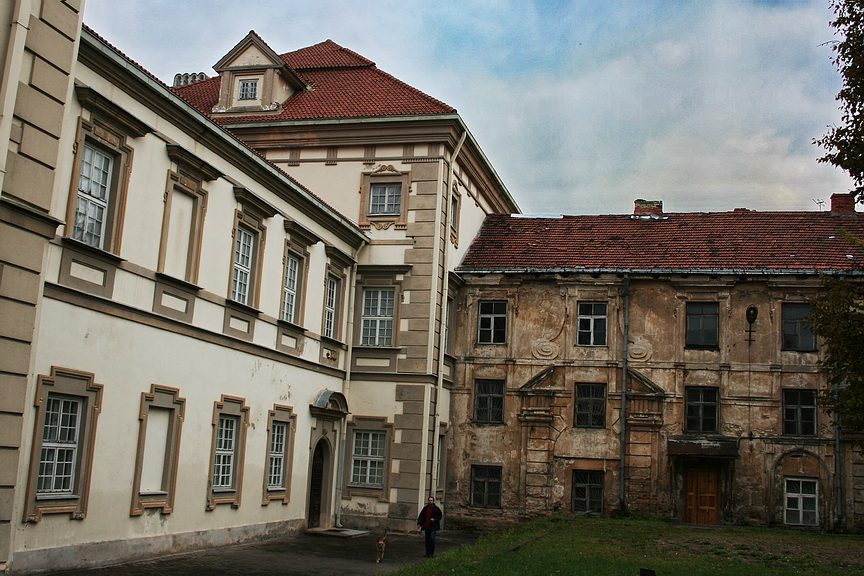
East and north pavilions of the palace

The Palace currently is under the restoration process during which lost parts of the building will also be rebuilt. Restored buildings will be used as new exhibition halls. The project is expected to be completed in ~2023, commemorating the 700 years jubilee of the first mention of Vilnius in 1323.

== Architecture ==
Being the only surviving Renaissance palace in Vilnius, it has features of the Netherlands Renaissance as well as Manneristic decorations native to the Lithuanian Renaissance architecture. Its original layout and symmetry of structural elements was distinctive to the palaces of the Late French Renaissance resembling that of Château de Fontainebleau and Luxembourg Palace in Paris.
