= Evangelical Lutheran Church, Vilnius =

Lutheran church in Vilnius, Lithuania

Evangelical Lutheran Church Evangelikų liuteronų bažnyčia
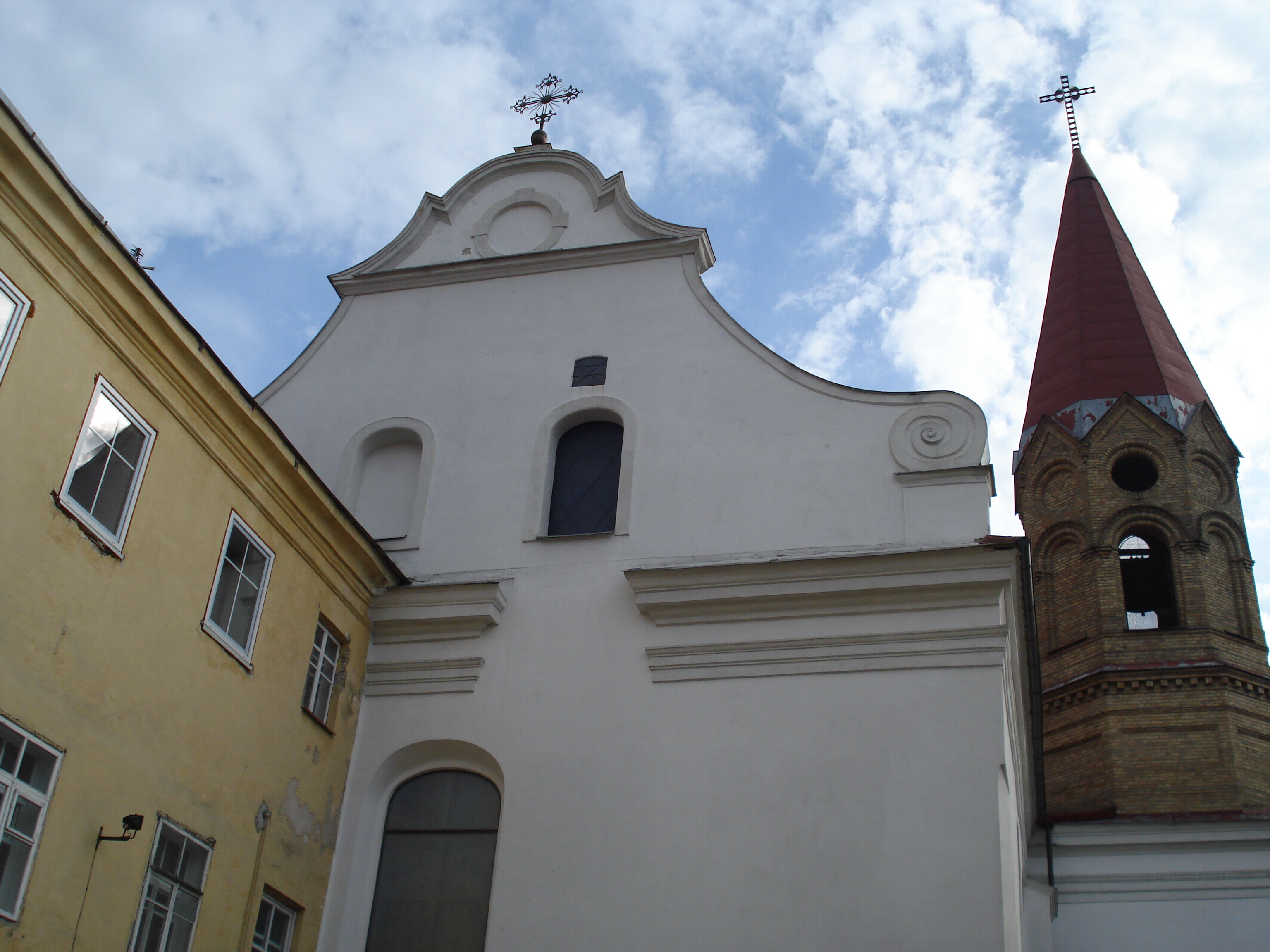
- Façade of the church in 2007

Religion
- Affiliation: Lutheranism
- District: Vilnius Old Town
- Ecclesiastical or organisational status: Used as a church
- Leadership: Evangelical Lutheran Church in Lithuania

Location
- Location: Vilnius, Lithuania
- Interactive map of Evangelical Lutheran Church; Evangelikų liuteronų bažnyčia
- Coordinates: 54°40′44.89″N 25°16′58.22″E

Architecture
- Architect: Johann Christoph Glaubitz
- Type: Church
- Style: Baroque
- Completed: 1744 (last reconstruction)
- Materials: Plastered masonry

Website
- Velb.lt

Evangelical Lutheran Church (Lithuanian: Evangelikų liuteronų bažnyčia) is a Lutheran church in the Vilnius Old Town. Its parish has 600 members and it is the only Evangelical Lutheran church in Vilnius.

Following the restoration of Lithuania's independence in 1990, the church was visited by the Swedish and Norwegian kings.

Commemorating the 500th anniversary of Reformation a monument to Martin Luther was unveiled in the church's yard.

== Gallery ==
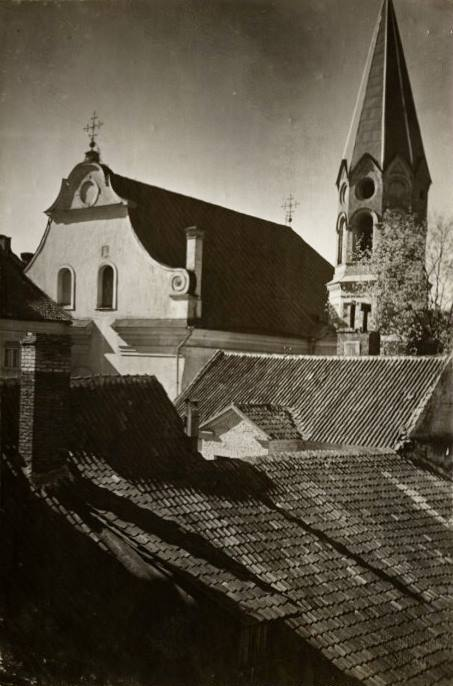
Photo of the church in 1917

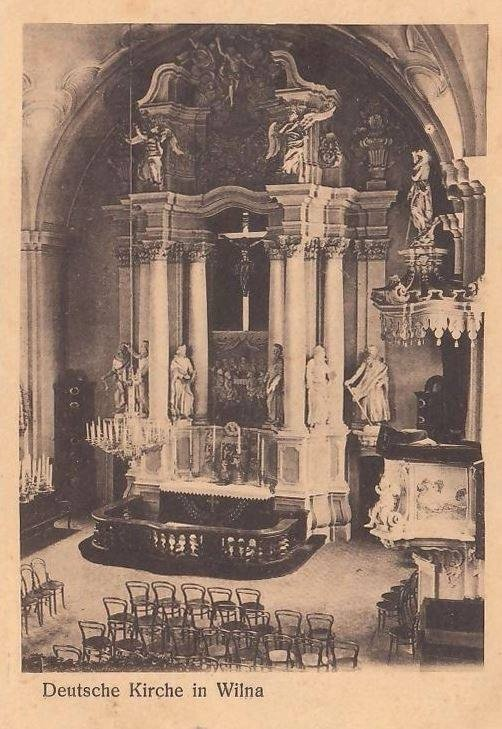
Interior of the church in the 20th century

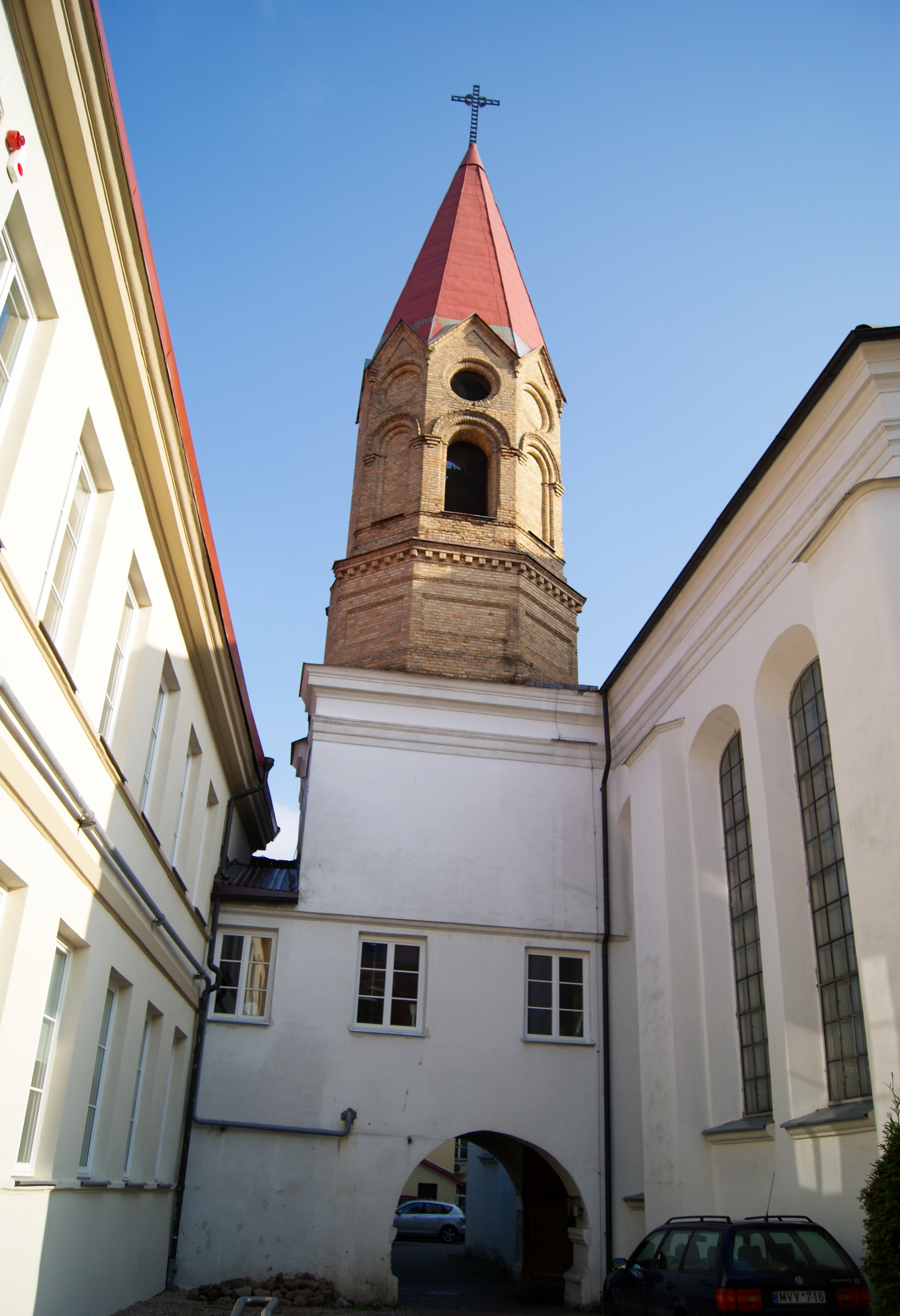
Belfry

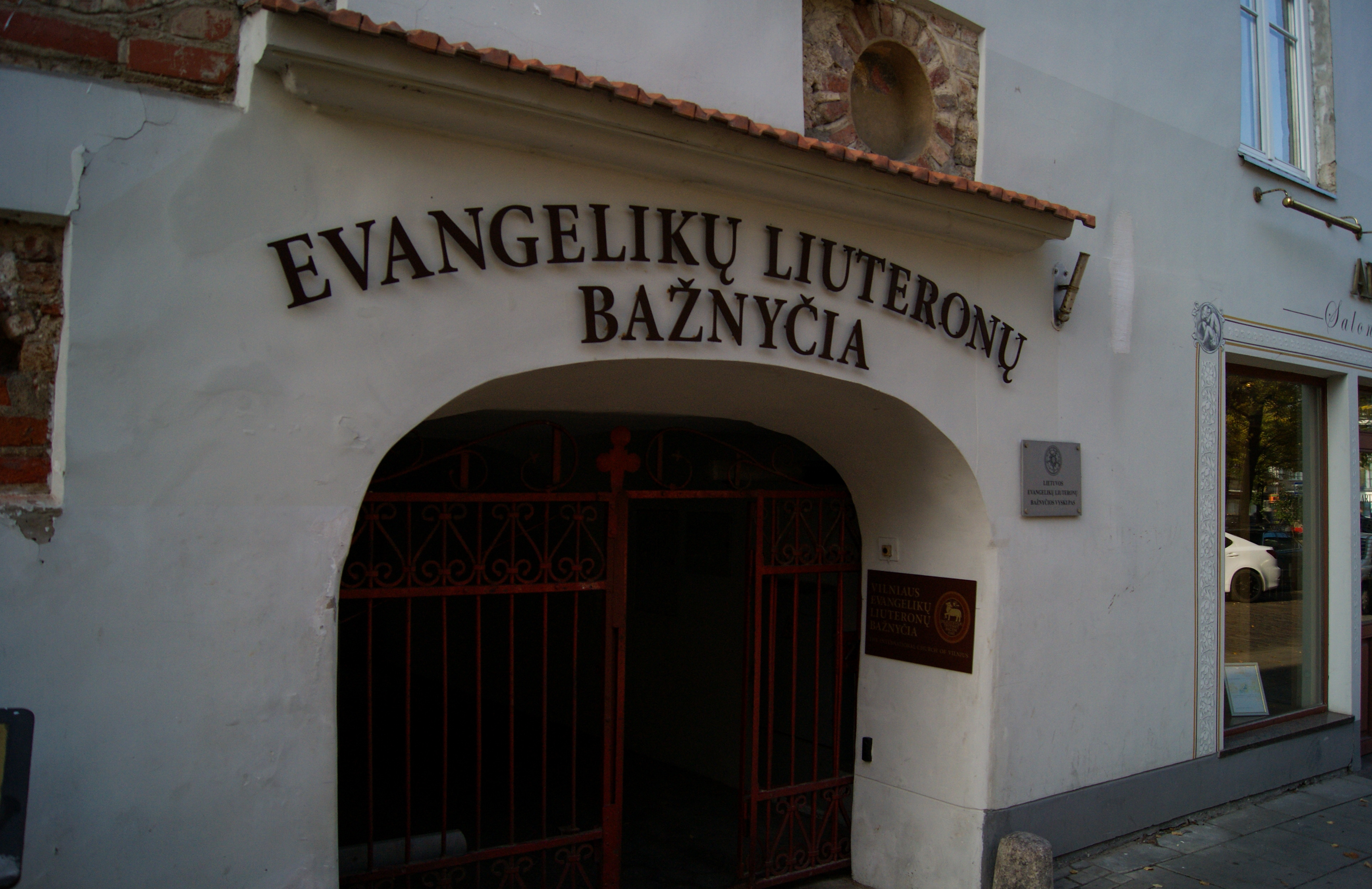
Entrance
