= Evangelical Lutheran Church in Lithuania =

Protestant-oriented Christian denomination in Lithuania

- Classification: Christian
- Orientation: Protestant
- Theology: High church Lutheranism
- Polity: Episcopal
- Primate: Mindaugas Sabutis
- Associations: Lutheran World Federation, World Council of Churches, Conference of European Churches, Porvoo Communion
- Full communion: Members of the Lutheran World Federation and Porvoo Communion; Lutheran Church – Missouri Synod; Lutheran Church in Norway
- Region: Lithuania
- Origin: 1557
- Separated from: Roman Catholic Church
- Congregations: 52
- Members: 19,000
- Official website: Official website

The Evangelical Lutheran Church in Lithuania (Lithuanian: Lietuvos Evangelikų Liuteronų Bažnyčia, ELCL) is a Lutheran church body comprising congregations in Lithuania. The ELCL is a member of the Porvoo Communion and the Lutheran World Federation.

In 2018 the ELCL reported having 19,000 active members. There are 52 congregations, and around 30 ordained clergy, including the bishop and two deacons. The current bishop (Lithuanian: Vyskupas) of the church is the Rt Revd Mindaugas Sabutis.

Around 0.56% of the population of Lithuania are members of the Evangelical Lutheran Church of Lithuania.

The abbreviated name for the church is in Latin, Unitas Lithuaniae or in Polish, Jednota Litewska (Lithuanian church provincial union).

== History ==
=== Lutheranism in the Grand Duchy ===
The Evangelical Lutheran Church of Lithuania dates back to the Reformation, when Kaunas, a large town in Lithuania, accepted the Augsburg Confession in 1550. In the 16th century Lutheranism started to spread from the two German-controlled neighbouring states of Livonia to the north and the Protestant formerly monastic, Teutonic State of Prussia to its south.

A united reformed church organization in Lithuania's church province can be counted from the year 1557 at the Synod in Vilnius on December 14 of that year. From that year the Synod met regularly forming all the church provinces of The Grand Duchy of Lithuania, at first from two and later growing to six districts and representative district synods. It sent its representatives to the General Polish/Lithuanian Synods; however in its administration it was in fact a self-governing Church. The first Superintendent was Simonas Zacijus (Szymon Zacjusz, approx 1507–1591).

In 1565 the anti-Trinitarian Lithuanian Brotherhood who rejected the doctrine of the Trinity separated from the church.

The parish network covered nearly all of The Grand Duchy. Its district centers were Vilnius, Kedainai, Biržai, Slucke, Kojdanove and Zabludove later Izabeline.

=== Prussian Lithuania ===
Since 1945 the Evangelical Lutheran Church of Lithuania has included Lutheran congregations in the formerly German Klaipėda Region, the northern part of Lithuania Minor, where Lutheranism dates back to 1525. The majority of Prussian Lithuanians living in East Prussia and in Memelland (what is now the Klaipėda Region of modern Lithuania) were members of the Evangelical Church of the old-Prussian Union, and most of them were resettled in the Federal Republic of Germany along with the rest of the East Prussian German inhabitants after World War II.

Since 1525 Lutheranism started spreading among Lithuanians in Lithuania Minor, which comprised about a quarter of Ducal Prussia, the first state to officially adopt Lutheranism as state religion. Ducal Prussia emerged from the Roman Catholic Teutonic Prussia, which, however, only had superficially missioned the rural, mostly Lithuanian population and thus only erected few churches.

The Prussian Lithuanians were only thoroughly Christianised starting with the Reformation in Prussia, the Prussian estates established the Lutheran Church in Prussia by the Church Order decided on 10 December 1525. Already on 18 January 1524 Bishop George I of Pomesania (and Samland), who had converted to Lutheranism in 1523, ordered to only use native languages at baptisms. The widespread pagan worship of Perkūnas, symbolised by the goat buck, was forbidden in the same year, and repeated in 1540. The Church Order provided for visitations of the parishioners and pastors, first carried out by Bishop George I in 1538. The principal usage of the native language secured the survival of the Lithuanian language in Prussia.

In 1544 Albert, Duke of Prussia founded the Albertina University, Königsberg in Prussia/Karaliaučius, which became the principal educational establishment for Lutheran pastors and theologians of Lithuanian language. At the same time the Counter-Reformation reduced the number of Protestants in the Grand Duchy of Lithuania (Lithuania proper). Right in 1544 Duke Albert appointed Lutheran pastors, who had fled anti-Protestant oppression in the Grand Duchy, as professors at the Albertina, namely Stanislovas Rapolionis (who finished his doctorate at Wittenberg University with a ducal scholarship) and Abraomas Kulvietis (exiled 1542).

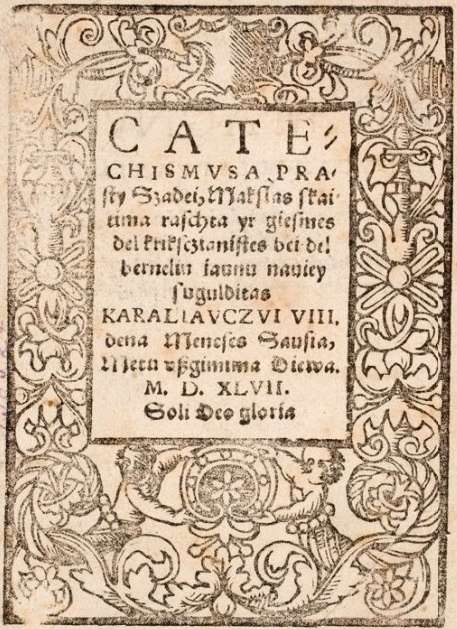
Lutheran Catechismusa Prasty Szadei by Martynas Mažvydas (1547) was the first book published in Lithuanian

More refugees from Lithuania proper followed and became pastors in various parishes, such as Martynas Mažvydas, who published the Lutheran Catechismusa Prasty Szadei in 1547. Among the first native Prussian Lithuanian pastors were Johannes Bretke/Jonas Bretkūnas (pastoring in Labiau/Labguva (Polessk) and later in Königsberg), who published a Lithuanian hymnal in 1589, and wrote the first Lithuanian translation of the Bible between 1590 and 1591. Thus the Reformation brought to Lithuania Minor and Lithuania proper the first printed book in the Lithuanian language, the Lutheran Catechism (1547), and later (1591) the first Lithuanian Bible, which was not printed before the 18th century, however.

=== Counter Reformation and decline of the Church ===
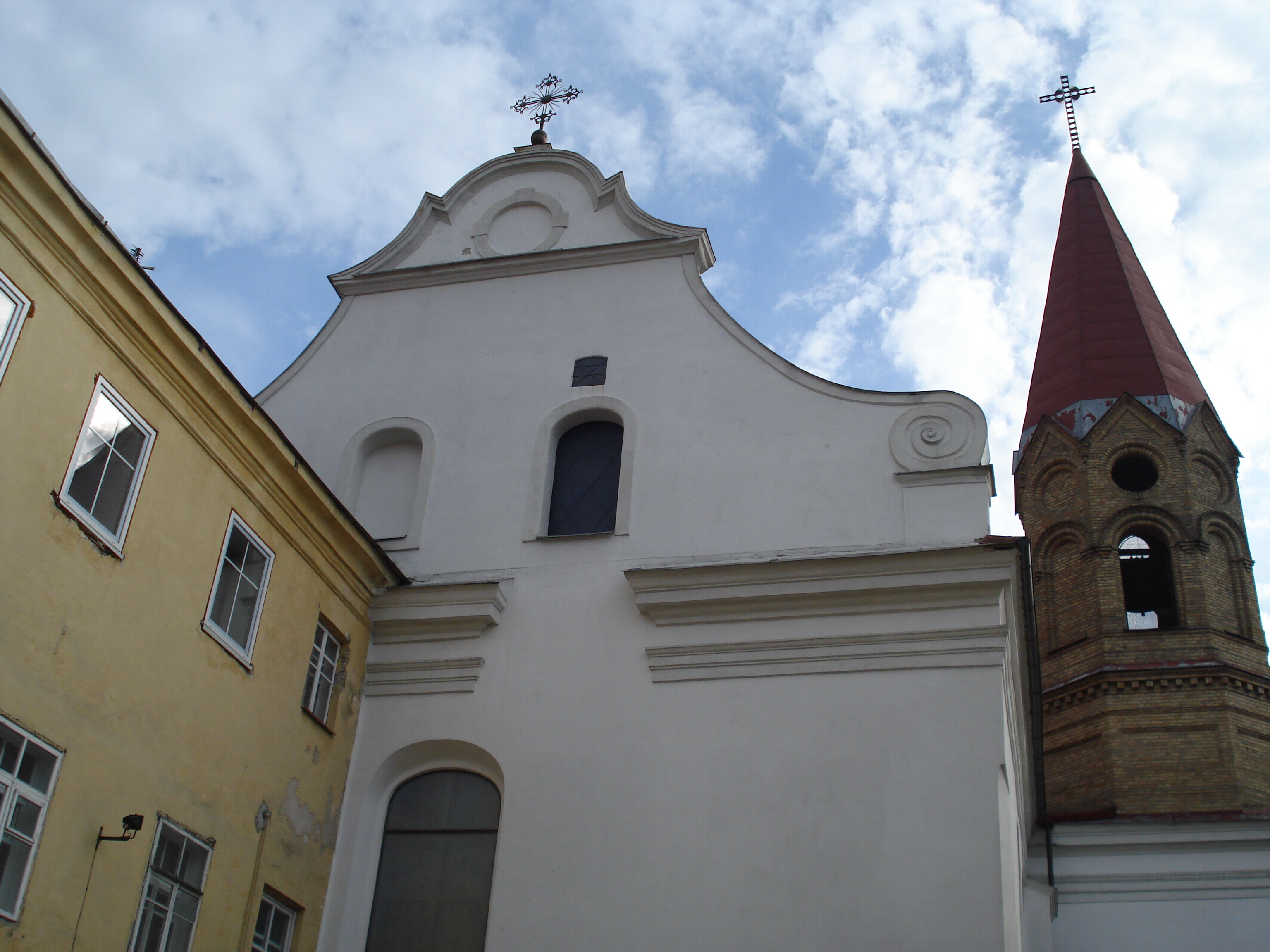
Evangelical Lutheran Church in Lithuania's capital Vilnius

With the dwindling of Protestantism in Lithuania proper after the 17th century, the Prussian Lithuanian Lutheran clergy consisted mostly of natives, many of German language, who had learned Lithuanian only as a second language.

In 1525, the Lutheran church had churches in only nine places in Lithuania Minor, to wit Gerdau/Girdava (Zheleznodorozhny), Insterburg/Įsrutis (Chernyakhovsk), Memel/Klaipėda (three churches, one of Lithuanian language), Puschdorf-Stablack/Stablaukis (Stabławki), Ragnit/Ragainė (Neman), Saalau/Želva (Kamenskoye), Tapiau/Tepliava (Gvardeysk), Tilsit/Tilžė (Sovetsk), and Wehlau/Vėluva (Znamensk). By 1531, more parishes had been founded; several of them were supervised by an archpriest (later called superintendent) on behalf of the bishop or the Pomesanian Consistory (est. in 1602 in Saalfeld in Prussia/Zaalfeld (Zalewo)), after giving up the episcopate in 1587).

Between 1529 and 1600, 31 Lutheran churches, mostly simple structures, were erected in Lithuania Minor. By the end of the 17th century, the number of Lutheran parishes in Lithuania Minor reached 112, with 68 offering Lithuanian services before the great plague (1709–1711), which killed about half the population and reduced the parishes with Lithuanian services to 59. In most parishes with services in Lithuanian and German, the same pastor served both language groups. Only in the cities of Königsberg (Church of St. Nicholas, Steindamm; Lithuanian Church of St. Elisabeth, and Sackheim), Memel, and Tilsit were separate churches exclusively used for parishes of Lithuanian language. Between 1700 and 1918, another 51, usually more massive, churches were erected.

In order to restaff orphaned pastorates after the plague, King Frederick William I of Prussia established two departments: in 1718, the Lithuanian Seminary (German: Litauisches Seminar, Lithuanian: Lietuvių kalbos seminaras closed in 1944) at Albertina, and in 1727, another one (Halės lietuvių kalbos seminaras) at the University of Halle upon Saale, closed in 1740. Johann Jakob Quandt, who also published a Lithuanian bible, a milestone in Lithuanian language standardization that was translated by him and a team of nine other theologians, was the first head of the seminary at Albertina.

The king established a fund granting scholarships for eight students at Albertina and free food for twelve students in Halle. Kristijonas Donelaitis, alumnus of Albertina Lithuanian Seminary and Lutheran pastor, became a famous poet who wrote a masterpiece of early Lithuanian literature. Daniel Klein, another Albertina alumni and pastor of Tilsit, wrote the first grammar book of the Lithuanian language and hymns, 36 of which are still in use in the Lithuanian Lutheran church today. Consistorial Councillor Ludwig Rhesa/Liudvikas Rėza, an Albertina alumni and professor leading the Lithuanian Seminary since 1810, distinguished himself as a collector and publisher of Lithuanian poems and re-editions of the Lithuanian bible in 1824.

The archpriests of Lithuania Minor were based in Tilsit (as of 1547), Ragnit (as of 1554), Insterburg (as of 1575), Schaaken in Prussia/Šakiai (Niekrasovo) (as of 1590), Memel (as of 1592), Wehlau (as of 1608), and Labiau (as of 1707). In 1751, the Pomesanian and Sambian consistories were merged in the Prussian Consistory in Königsberg, led by general superintendents since 1812. By the mid-1720s, the rising number of Lutheran parishes were organised in inspections (renamed Kirchenkreis in the 19th century; i.e. deaneries), such as in Stallupönen/Stalupėnai (Nesterov), Fischhausen/Žuvininkai (Primorsk), Schaaken in Prussia, Labiau, Insterburg, Tilsist, Ragnit and Memel.

The overall number of Prussian parishes with Lithuanian service rose to 92 in the course of the 18th and 19th centuries due to the ongoing establishment of new churches, while services in Lithuanian were given up in many parishes, rather in the south than in the north of Lithuania Minor, due to the assimilation of Lithuanian speakers to German.

After the plague, the depopulated areas were also resettled with Lutheran refugees of German language from Salzburg. So by the second half of the 19th century the number of parishes offering Lithuanian services had shrunk to 67 (116,998 parishioners), with an additional seven Roman Catholic parishes (3,395 faithful), mostly of immigrants from Lithuania proper, and five Baptist congregations of Lithuanian language (with 400 congregants).

By 1913 only 45 parishes offered Lutheran services in Lithuanian, in part a consequence of the banning of Lithuanian as a school language in Germany in 1873. So the Pietist laymen group called sakytojai (German: Stundenhalter, i.e. lay preacher traditionally holding prayer hours in private homes before the actual service in Lithuanian, during the prior German service would take place; cf. also Shtundists) kept the Lithuanian language from vanishing.

=== Lithuanian Lutheranism between the wars ===
Before World War II there were 80 Evangelical Lutheran Church in Lithuania congregations in Lithuania proper, and 72 pastors were serving about 25,000 members. Whereas in the Klaipėda Region (a Lithuanian autonomous region between 1924 and 1939) 40 pastors, many maintaining services in Lithuanian, served about 137,750 mostly Lutheran parishioners (among them 35,650 Prussian Lithuanians) in 1930.

However, the parishes in the Klaipėda Region remained members of the Ecclesiastical Province of East Prussia until 1925, a subsection of the Evangelical Church of the old-Prussian Union, a church of united administration of Lutheran and Reformed congregations founded in 1817 by combining the Lutheran and Reformed churches in then Prussia. The parishes formed the Memel deanery, the Heydekrug/Šilutė deanery and the new Pogegen/Pagėgiai deanery, comprising since 1919 those parishes of the deanery of Tilsit, itself remaining with Germany, which were located north of the Memel/Nemunas river and thus disentangled.

After the nationalist demagoguery following the cession of the Klaipėda Region (northern Lithuania Minor), first a League of Nations mandate, after World War I, only nine Lutheran parishes continued Lithuanian services in the southern and central part of Lithuania Minor, which remained with Germany, but were mostly forbidden after the Nazi takeover in 1933.

On 30 July 1919 a majority of 82 synodals from Klaipėda Region decided to keep the jurisdiction with the Ecclesiastical Province of East Prussia against two votes for a separation and 15 abstentions. However, after the Lithuanian annexation of the region, not hindered by the protecting powers combined in the Council of Ambassadors, the Lithuanian government demanded the separation of the Protestant church, announcing it would otherwise withhold the salaries of the clergy.

The majority of the regional clergy and the Evangelical Supreme Ecclesiastical Council (Evangelischer Oberkirchenrat, EOK), the old-Prussian executive body, resisted this plan. Therefore, Viktoras Gailius, Land Director of the Klaipėda Region addressed the EOK in Berlin, which sent envoys to Memel, in order to conclude a contract on the future of the old-Prussian Lutheran parishes and the one single Reformed congregation in Memel city, on 27 and 29 September 1923. But an agreement turned out impossible.

Superintendent Franz Gregor of Memel deanery preferred the regional synodal federation to be a subsection of the East Prussian ecclesiastical province, whereas the faction of sakytojai laymen within the regional Lutheran parishes, forming since 1919 the mostly Lithuanian-language unofficial Klaipėda Regional Synod (German: Evangelische Memeler Landessynode), demanded – also incited by the Lithuanian central government – under the government-appointed leader Pastor Valentinas Gailius (Ruß/Rusnė) an independent church body.

However, Gailius, whom the Lithuanian government had granted the title general superintendent, failed to win the pastors and parishioners to also elect him general superintendent. His many decrees were simply ignored in the parishes, who considered his officiating an illegitimate intrusion of government interferment into affairs of ecclesiastical autonomy. The consistory in Königsberg, still the competent directing body, deposed him as pastor.

So in April and June 1924 Gailius twice convened the Lithuanianian-language unofficial Klaipėda Regional Synod and formed a preliminary executive body for an independent church. However, the majority of the pastors and of the elected representatives of the parishioners rejected his approach. Embittered Gailius finally resigned.

In 1925 then the Klaipėda Directorate sent for their part a delegation, including independists and proponents wishing to upkeep the connection with the old-Prussian church, in order to negotiate with the EOK in Berlin. After negotiations between April 18 to 23, and again July 16 to 18, 1925 the Agreement concerning the Evangelical Church of the Memel Territory (German: Abkommen betr. die evangelische Kirche des Memelgebietes) was concluded and signed on July 23.

Both parties had stipulated that the Lutheran parishes and the single Reformed congregation in Memel should form the Regional Synodal Federation of the Memel Territory (German: Landessynodalverband Memelgebiet) with its own consistory led by an elected general superintendent. This regional synodal federation then formed an old-Prussian ecclesiastical province of its own, disentangled from that of East Prussia. The federation was independent from any government interference by the Lithuanian central government or the Klaipėda Directorate. In 1926 first elections were held for the regional synod, and the synodals elected Gregor the first general superintendent and church councillors for the executive body, the consistory in Memel, which constituted in 1927. When in 1933 Gregor retired Otto Obereigner, the former Superintendent of Pogegen deanery, succeeded him.

German and Lithuanian were equally to be used in preaching and every pastor was to master both languages. Until 1 January 1932 also foreign pastors were allowed be employed. However, in 1923 the native language of 37 out of 40 pastors in the Klaipėda Region was German, and only three were native speakers of Lithuanian. In 1936 their number had shrunk to two, with the pastors being German native speakers mostly only able to passively understand and read Lithuanian.

With the formation of the German Evangelical Church on 14 July 1933, uniting all German Protestant regional churches under Nazi government and German Christian movement pressure, members of the Memel consistory agreed to further collaborate with the Berlin-based EOK within the new federation, whereas the Lithuanian central government refused to allow the regional Protestant representatives to join conventions of the German Evangelical Church.

The central government doubted the further validity of the concordat of 1925 since it considered the old-Prussian church to have changed its legal identity. However, on 26 August 1933 the EOK assured that the old-Prussian church persisted so that the central government refrained from cancelling the concordat.

In 1934 the central government-appointed governor in the Klaipėda Region expelled nine pastors bearing German citizenship in 1934, causing Nazi Germany to protest. After 1935 Lithuania accounted for Hitler’s rising power and rather maintained a low profile in the controversy on affairs in the Klaipėda Region.

With Lithuania ceding Klaipėda Region with effect of 22 March 1939, after the German ultimatum to Lithuania, again not hindered by the protecting powers of the Council of Ambassadors, the majority of the parishioners welcomed the return to Germany. The EOK sent telegrammes to the parishes thanking them for maintaining the union with the old-Prussian church in the prior years, suggesting this union evidenced their German attitude. On 1 May 1939 the regional synodal federation was abolished and its parishes reintegrated into the Ecclesiastical Province of East Prussia.

=== Post war development ===
By the end of 1944, when the Soviet Red Army approached the Klaipėda region, the Nazi authorities ordered civilians to evacuate the endangered areas. However, the evacuation started too late since the Red Army approached much faster than expected and could cut off the territorial connection with German-held territories by January 26, 1945. Many refugees perished due to Soviet low-flying strafing attacks.

Rescued were mostly those who managed to flee before the Soviets via land or by sea vessels into the areas conquered by the Britons and Americans. Among them the pastors A. Keleris, J. Pauperas, M. Preikšaitis, O. Stanaitis, A. Trakis, and J. Urdse, who recollected Lithuanian parishes and reorganised Lithuanian pastoring in the western zones of Allied-occupied Germany. Together with 65,000 refugees from Lithuania proper, mostly Roman Catholic, who made their way to the western zones, 158 schools of Lithuanian language were founded there until 1948.

With the emigration of many Lithuanians to overseas or the assimilation of the remaining Lithuanians and Prussian Lithuanians, who hold German citizenship, in West Germany the number shrunk to a mere one, Litauisches Gymnasium/Vasario 16-osios gimnazija (Lithuanian High School) (in German) in Lampertheim in Hesse. Until 1990 this high and boarding school remained the only Lithuanian school in the non-Communist countries, attended by several known exiled Lithuanians.

The remaining inhabitants of Lithuania Minor underwent terrible years under the Soviet annexation, especially those in the Russian Kaliningrad oblast. They were generally robbed and plundered, many imprisoned in labour camps, some deported to Siberia, and generally refused any access to ordinary food supplies causing most of them to perish.

An exception were those Prussian Lithuanians surviving in or returning to the Klaipėda Region, which became part of Lithuanian Soviet Socialist Republic on 7 April 1948. They could return to their homes, which, however, had often been taken by immigrants from Lithuania proper. There were generally considered second class citizens.

The Lutheran parishes in the Klaipėda Region were revitalised by the laymen sakytojai, since all pastors had perished or remained exiled in the west. The first Lutheran service is recorded for 9 January 1945 in Priekulė (Prökuls). With time 27 Lutheran parishes were registered in all of Lithuania, with 12 located in the Klaipėda Region, to wit in Katyčiai (Koadjuthen), Kintai (Kinten), Klaipėda (Memel), Lauksargiai (Launen), Pašyšiai (Passon-Reisgen), Plikiai (Plicken), Priekulė, Ramučiai (Ramutten), Saugai (Sausgallen), Šilutė (Heydekrug), Vanagai (Wannaggen), Vyžiai (Wiekschnen). They form a part of the Evangelical Lutheran Church of Lithuania since.

When in 1958 the Soviet Union allowed Prussian Lithuanians to revert for their prior annulled German citizenship many emigrated to West Germany until 1967. So after war-related death toll and flight, perishing under Soviet post-war occupation, and the emigration in the 1950s and 1960s a mere 7,000 to 8,000 of the 137,750 mostly Lutheran Protestants (among them 35,650 Prussian Lithuanians; as of 1930) continued to live in the Klaipėda Region.

During the changes of World War II, also many congregation members from Lithuania proper emigrated, were exiled, or were killed. The churches that remained without pastors were closed and used for other purposes or were destroyed. During Soviet occupation of Lithuania proper from 1940 to 1941 and again 1944 to 1990, religious instruction was forbidden and church membership entailed public penalties.

With Lithuanian independence in 1990, the ELCL began to receive back church buildings and properties that in Soviet times were nationalised and used for various profane purposes. Churches and property were returned throughout the 1990s.

== Primates ==
- Jonas Kalvanas (1976-1995)
- Jonas Viktoras Kalvanas (1995-2003)
- Mindaugas Sabutis (2004-present)

== Relations with other churches ==
Since 1989, there has been a partnership with North Elbian Evangelical Lutheran Church, now Evangelical Lutheran Church in Northern Germany. Reflecting its conservative confessional Lutheran stance, the ELCL declared itself in full fellowship with the Lutheran Church–Missouri Synod, from the United States, in 2000.

== See also ==
- Religion in Lithuania
