= Mindaugas Sabutis =

Lithuanian prelate (born 1975)

The Most Reverend Mindaugas Sabutis
- Primate of the Evangelical Lutheran Church in Lithuania
- Church: Evangelical Lutheran Church in Lithuania
- Elected: 24 April 2004

Orders
- Ordination: 4 April 1998
- Consecration: 19 June 2004 by Jānis Vanags

Personal details
- Born: 26 August 1975 (age 51) Tauragė, Lithuania
- Spouse: Vilma Sabutis
- Children: 3
- Education: Vilnius University; Klaipėda University

Mindaugas Sabutis (born 26 August 1975 in Tauragė) is a Lithuanian prelate who is the current Primate of the Evangelical Lutheran Church in Lithuania.

== Biography ==
Sabutis was born in Tauragė in the then Lithuanian Soviet Socialist Republic, present-day Lithuania. He was baptized by Bishop Jonas V. Kalvanas at the Evangelical Lutheran Church in Tauragė. In 1993, he enrolled in the Department of Evangelical Theology at Klaipėda University. During his third year of study, in 1996, he was ordained a deacon. After graduating with a BA in Evangelical Theology in 1997, he settled in Jurbarkas and served in four parishes: Jurbarkas, Skirsnemunė, Smalininkai and Vilkyškiai. On 4 April 1998, he was ordained a priest at the Church of the Assumption. On 5 December 1998, he was invited to serve as pastor of the parish of Vilnius. In June 1999, he began master's studies at the Vilnius University in the Department of Religious Studies and Research graduating in June 2001. In July 1999, he married his wife Vilma who works at the Lithuanian Bible Society.

Since 2000, Sabutis has been a member of the Lithuanian Evangelical Lutheran Church Consistory. In February 2001, he became a member of the board of directors of the Bible Society of the Evangelical Church and was elected vice-president in 2005. From 8 December 2001 to July 2004, he was the chairman of the Youth Center of the Evangelical Lutheran Church in Lithuania. On 24 April 2004, he was elected as bishop of the Evangelical Lutheran Church and consecrated on 19 June. In September 2005, he commenced his doctoral studies at Klaipėda University where he also works as a lecturer. Sabutis is also the coordinator for the Lutheran Union of East and Central Europe. On 22 May 2009, he was awarded the title of Honorary Doctor from the Concordia Theological Seminary (Fort Wayne, Indiana). Since 2011, he has also been the spiritual leader of the Lutheran Church in the Republic of Belarus.
