= Kazimierz Sapieha =

Kazimierz Sapieha may refer to:

- Aleksander Kazimierz Sapieha (1624–1671), Polish nobleman. He became bishop of Samogitia in 1660 and of Vilnius in 1667
- Antoni Kazimierz Sapieha (born 1739)
- Jan Kazimierz Sapieha the Elder (died 1730), Grand Hetman of Lithuania
- Jan Kazimierz Sapieha the Younger (1637–1720/1642–1720), Lithuanian nobleman
- Kazimierz Leon Sapieha (1609–1656), nobleman of the Grand Duchy of Lithuania
- Kazimierz Melchiades Sapieha (born 1654)
- Kazimierz Mikołaj Sapieha (born 1639)
- Kazimierz Nestor Sapieha (1757–1798), Polish-Lithuanian noble (szlachcic) and one of the creators of the 3 May Constitution
- Kazimierz Władysław Sapieha (born 1703)
- Tomasz Kazimierz Sapieha (born 1654)

== See also ==
- Kazimierz Lew Sapieha
