= Kazimierz Leon Sapieha =

Lithuanian nobleman (1609–1656)

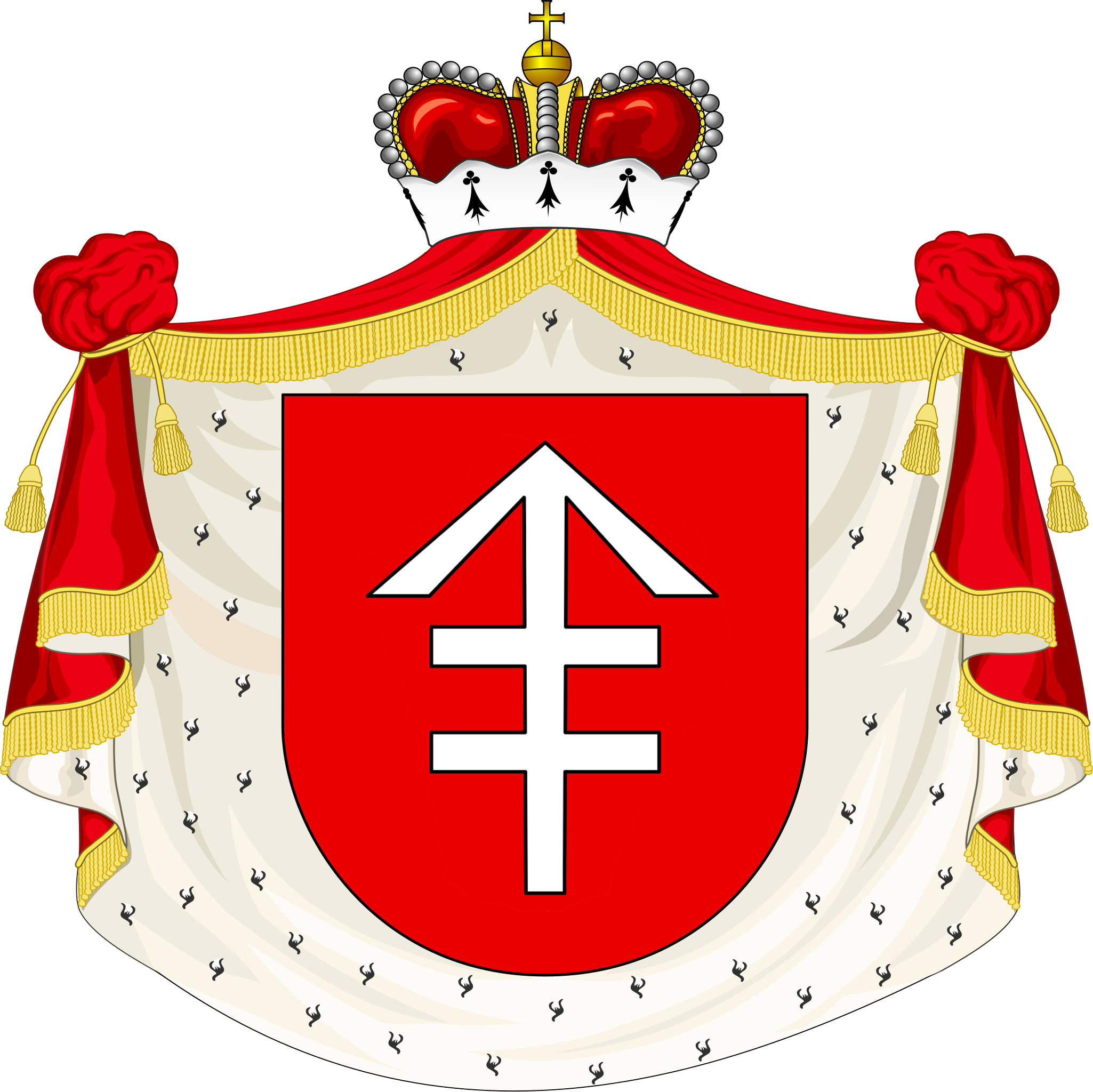

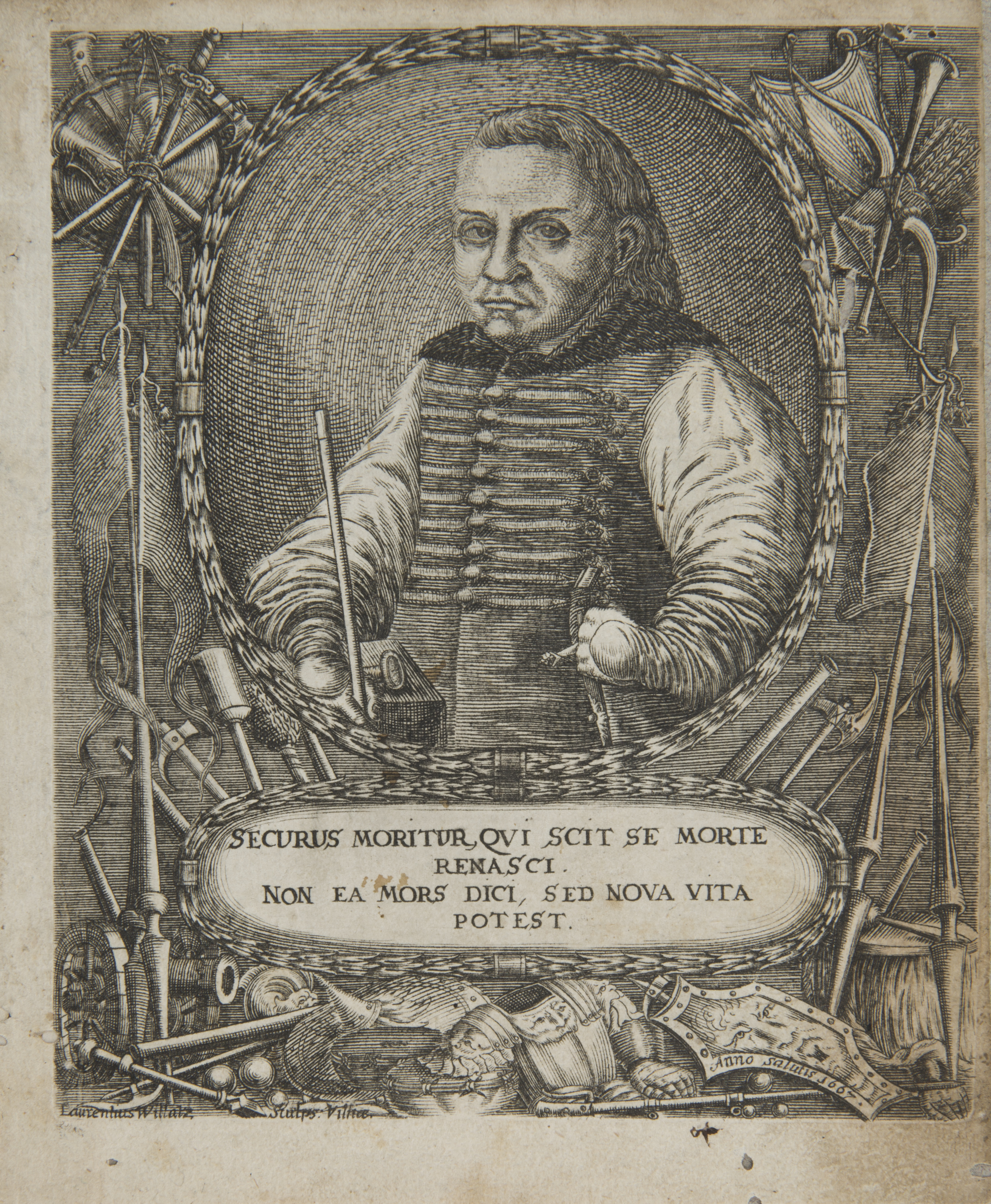
Kazimierz Leon Sapieha

Kazimierz Leon Sapieha (Lithuanian: Kazimieras Leonas Sapiega) (1609–1656) was a nobleman of the Grand Duchy of Lithuania, a part of the Polish–Lithuanian Commonwealth.

== Career ==
He had various roles and titles, including Royal Secretary and Grand Writer of Lithuania from 1631, Court Marshal of Lithuania from 1637, Deputy Chancellor of Lithuania from 1645.

He was an opponent of Janusz Radziwiłł and organized anti-Swedish resistance in Lithuania during The Deluge.

== Personal life ==
He was the son of Great Secretary Lew Sapieha.

He studied abroad in Munich and Ingolstadt, later becoming a Sejm deputy in 1631. He was also one of four executors of Władysław IV Waza's last will.
