= Sapieha =

Polish and Lithuanian noble family

- Princely arms of the family (1858–59)
- Current region: Poland and Lithuania
- Members: Lew Sapieha; Eustachy Sapieha
- Estates: Sapieha Palace in Warsaw; Sapieha Palace in Lviv; Sapieha Palace in Vilnius; Ruzhany Palace

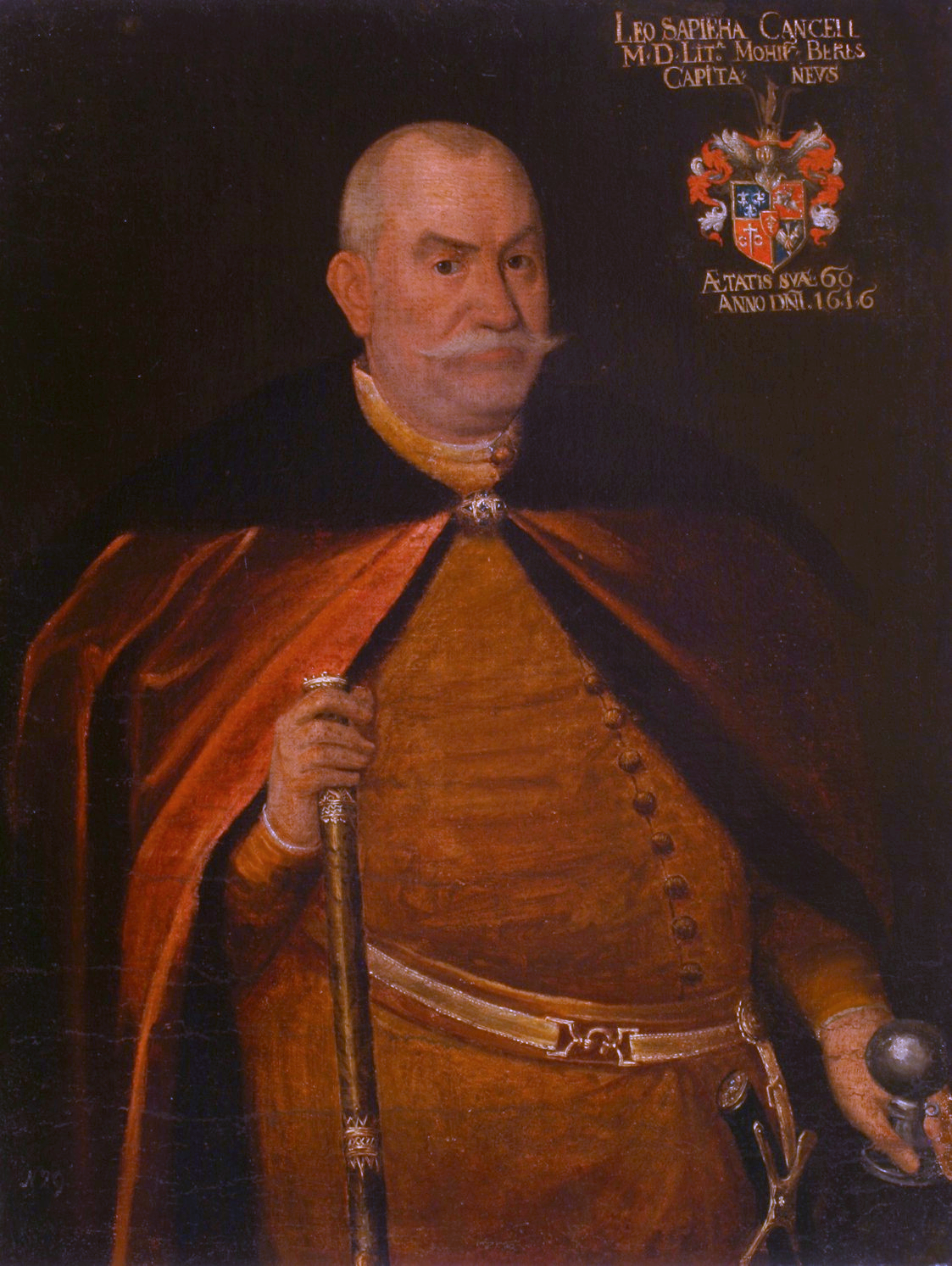
Lew Sapieha, the most prominent member of the family

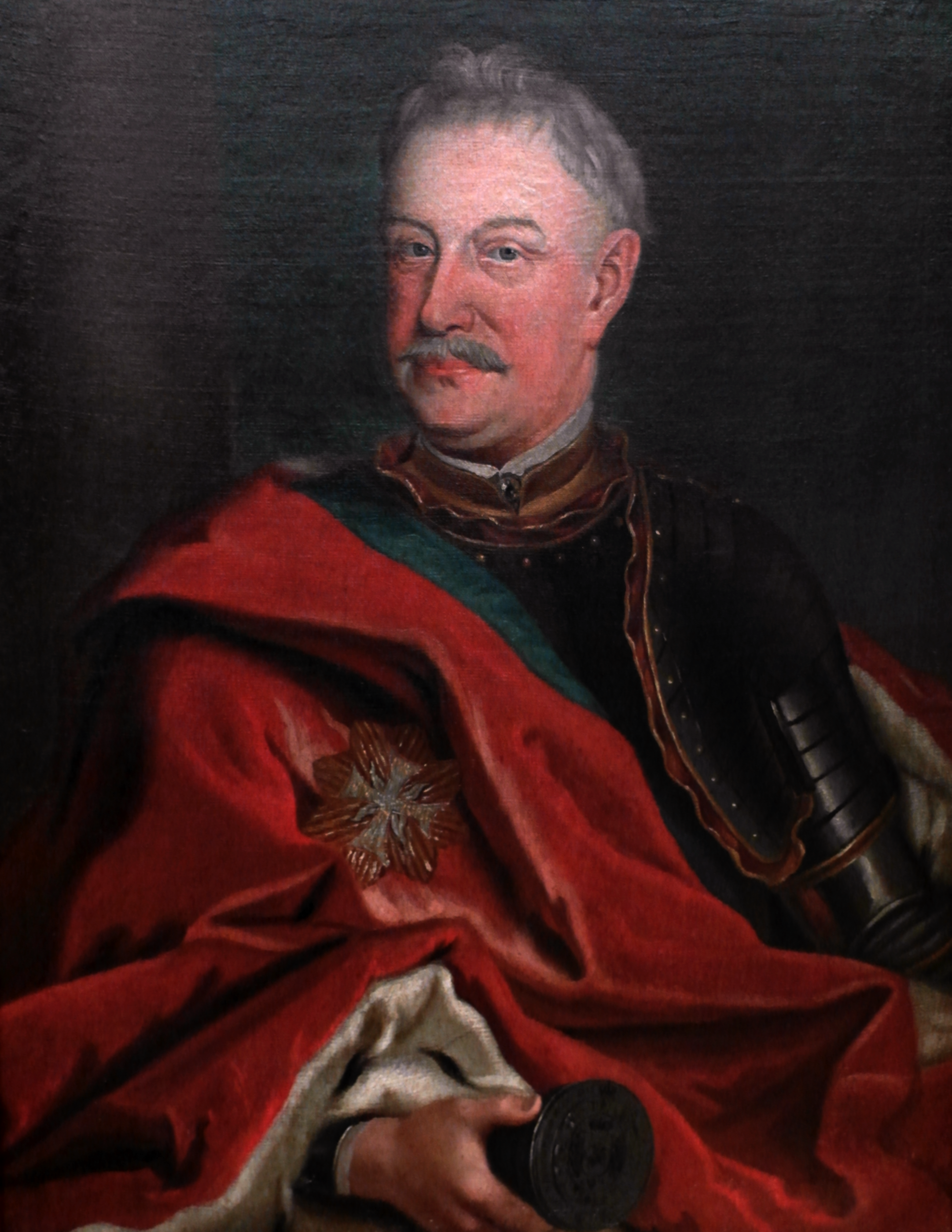
Jan Fryderyk Sapieha

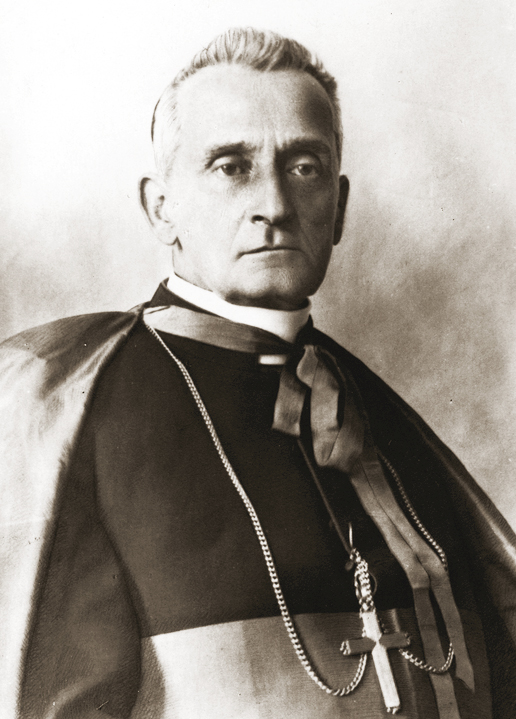
Adam Stefan Sapieha – Archbishop of Kraków.

The House of Sapieha (Note: [saˈpʲjɛxa]; Belarusian: Сапега, romanized: Sapieha; Russian: Сапега, romanized: Sapega; Lithuanian: Sapiega.) is a Polish–Lithuanian noble and magnate family of Ruthenian origin, descending from the medieval boyars of Smolensk and Polotsk. The family acquired great influence and wealth in the Polish–Lithuanian Commonwealth during the 16th century.

== History ==
The first confirmed records of the Sapieha family date back to the 15th century, when Semen Sopiha (Belarusian: Сямён Сапега) was mentioned as a writer (scribe) of the then King of Poland and Grand Duke of Lithuania, Casimir IV Jagiellon (Polish: Kazimierz IV Jagiellończyk) for the period of 1441–49. Semen had two sons, Bohdan and Iwan.

Possibly, the family of Semen Sopiha owned the village of Sopieszyno near Gdansk, which they left because of the Teutonic invasion. Sopieszyno is one of the oldest Pomeranian villages. The records have it that already in the 11th-12th centuries it was a knightly estate. It was then mentioned in 1399 as a village owned in fiefdom by knights subject to the Polish Crown. Their family could be involved in the Baltic-Volga trade, as many Pomeranian families. The family descended from Polotsk boyars subject to Lithuania.

The creator of the fortune and power of the Sapieha family was the Court and Great Chancellor and Great Hetman of Lithuania, Lew Sapieha.

The princely title of the Sapieha-Kodenski branch was recognized in Poland in 1572 and in Austria-Hungary in 1845, while that of the Sapieha-Rozanski line was officially acknowledged in Russia in 1880.

On 14 September 1700, Michał Franciszek Sapieha had obtained the title of prince from Emperor Leopold I, but the title became extinct upon his death on 19 November 1700. That year, the family lost its dominant position in the Grand Duchy as a result of its defeat in the Lithuanian Civil War. In 1768, members of the Sapieha family obtained recognition of the princely title from the Polish Sejm. After the partitions of Poland, the family appeared in the list of persons authorised to bear the title of Prince of the Kingdom of Poland in 1824. The title was recognised in Austria in 1836 and 1840, and in Russia in 1874 and 1901. In 1905, the family obtained the qualification of Serene Highness in Austria.

The maternal grandmother of Queen Mathilde of Belgium was a Princess of the house of Sapieha.

== Coat of arms ==
The Sapieha family used the Polish coat of arms named "Lis".

Lis coat of arms

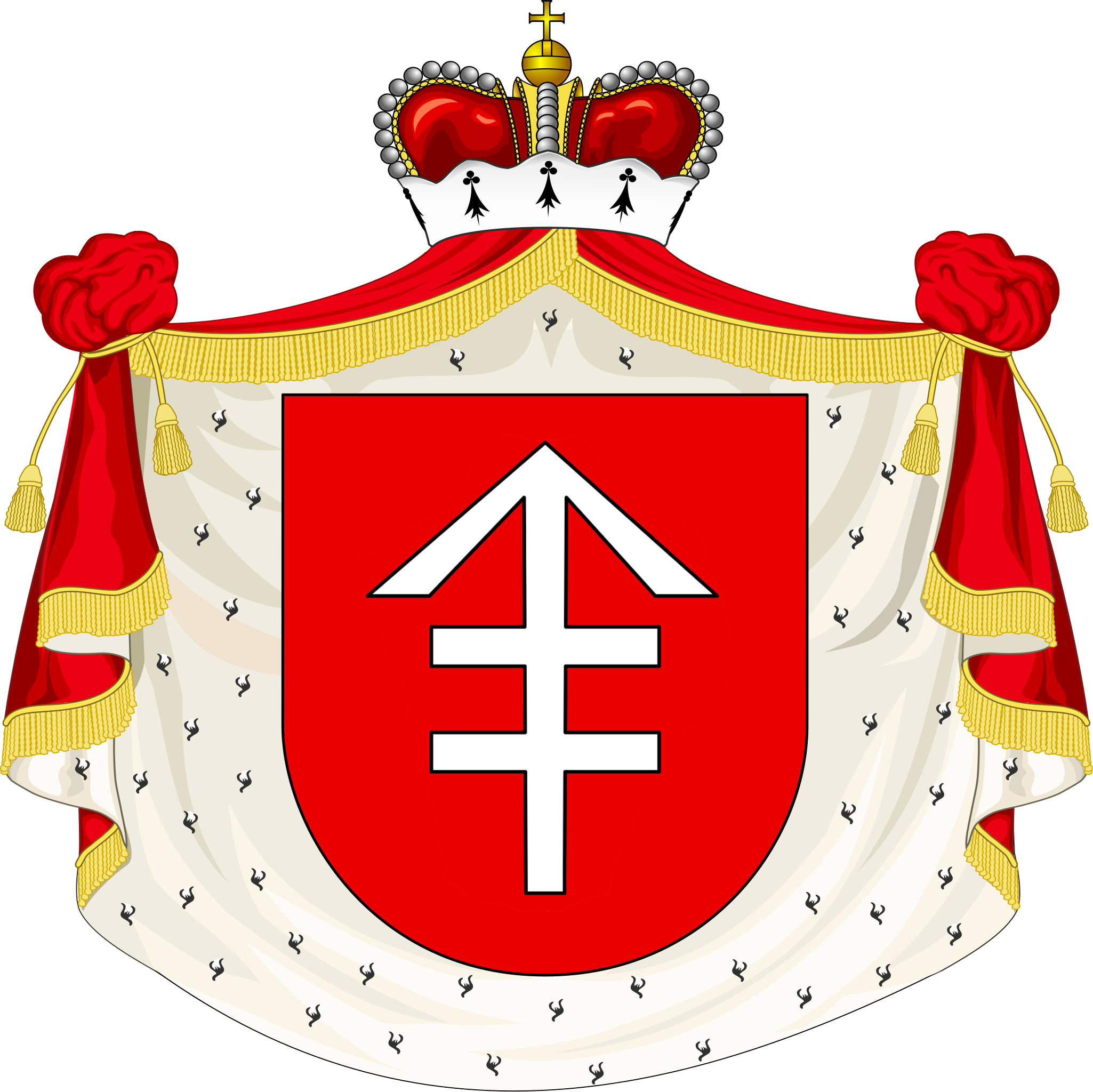
Original arms of the Princes Sapieha

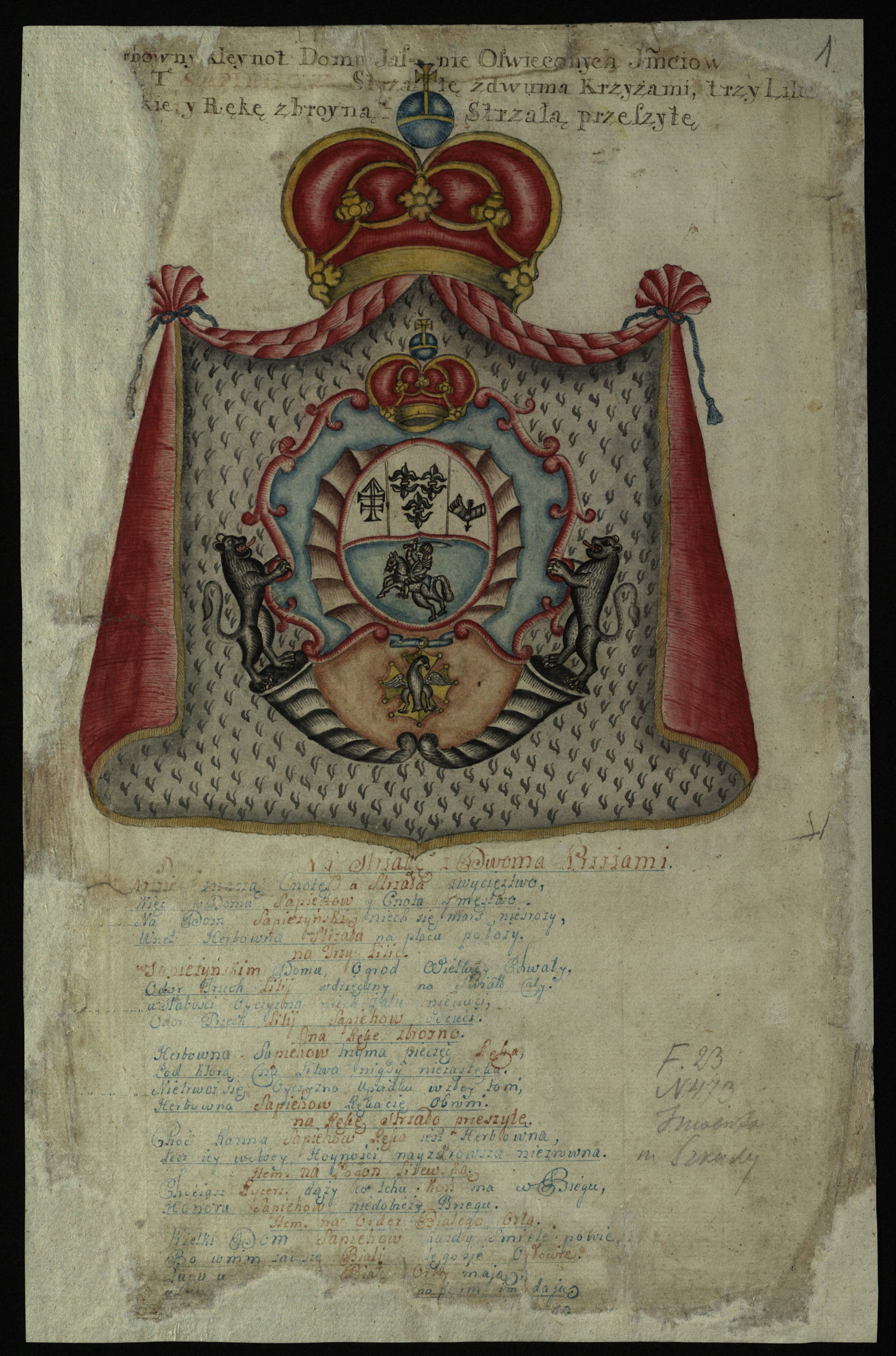
Coat of arms of Sapieha, 1786

Later arms of the Princes Sapieha (1858–1859)

== Notable members ==
- Adam Stefan Sapieha (1867–1951), cardinal, archbishop of Kraków
- Adam Zygmunt Sapieha (1892–1970), cavalryman, aviator
- Aleksander Michał Sapieha (1730–1793), voivode of Płock, Field Lithuanian Hetman, Grand Lithuanian Chancellor, marshal of the Lithuanian Tribunal
- Aleksander Paweł Sapieha (1672-1734), Marshal of the Court of Lithuania and Grand Marshal of Lithuania
- Aleksander Sapieha (1888–1976), aviator
- Andrzej Józef Sapieha (1894–1945), he participated in the Polish–Soviet War, member of the Armia Krajowa
- Andrzej Sapieha (1539–1621), Great Royal Deputy Cup-bearer of Lithuania, castellan of Minsk, and Voivode of Polotsk and Smolensk
- Anna Zofia Sapieha (1799–1864), wife of Prince Adam Jerzy Czartoryski
- Arabella Theresa Sapieha (1960), Princess Sapieha-Rozanski
- Bohdan Sapieha, several people
- Eustachy Kajetan Sapieha (1797–1860), he participated in the November uprising, politically tied with the "Hôtel Lambert"
- Eustachy Sapieha (1881–1963), politician, Polish Minister of Foreign Affairs 1920-1921
- Eustachy Seweryn Sapieha (1916–2004), hunter, historian of the Sapieha family
- Franciszek Sapieha (1772–1829), general, he participated in the Kościuszko uprising
- Fryderyk Sapieha (1599–1650), voivode of Mścisław, podkomorzy of Vitebsk
- Kazimierz Lew Sapieha (1607–1656), Marshal of the Crown, son of Lew Sapieha
- Jan Andrzej Sapieha (1910–1989), head of House Sapieha, he participated in the Defence War of 1939
- Jan Fryderyk Sapieha (1680–1751), Grand Recorder of Lithuania
- Jan Kazimierz Sapieha the Elder (?–1730), Grand Hetman of Lithuania
- Jan Kazimierz Sapieha the Younger, (c. 1642–1720), Field Hetman
- Jan Pavel Sapieha-Rozanski (1935) head of House Sapieha, sometime Belgian ambassador to Brazil
- Jan Piotr Sapieha (1569–1611), Polish royal officer
- Jan Stanisław Sapieha (1589–1635), Court Marshal of Lithuania, Great Lithuanian Marshal
- Józef Sapieha, he participated in the Polish–Soviet War
- Karol Władysław Sapieha (1920–1941), pilot of the Polish Air Forces in Great Britain in World War II
- Kazimierz Nestor Sapieha (1757–1798), political activist, general
- Leon Aleksander Sapieha (1883–1944), landlord, member of the Sejm, member of Związek Walki Zbrojnej and the Armia Krajowa
- Leon Roman Sapieha (1915–1940), pilot of the Polish Air Forces in Great Britain in World War II
- Leon Sapieha (1803–1878), political and economic activist
- Lew Jerzy Sapieha (1913–1990), poet, writer
- Lew Sapieha (1557–1633), Court Chancellor and Great Hetman of Lithuania
- Maria Sapieha (1910–2009), social activist, wife of Prince Jan Andrzej Sapieha-Rozanski
- Michał Franciszek Sapieha (1670–1700), General, Koniuszy
- Mikołaj Krzysztof Sapieha (1613–1639), voivode of Minsk
- Mikołaj Sapieha (1581–1644), voivode of Minsk and of Brześć Litewski, castellan of Vilnius
- Mikołaj Sapieha (1588–1638), voivode of Minsk and of Nowogródek
- Paola Maria de Bourbon Orléans e Bragança Sapieha (1983), model and product designer, wife of fashion photographer Prince Constantin Swiatopolk-Czetwertyński
- Paweł Jan Sapieha (1609–1665), voivode of the Witebsk and Vilnius, Great Hetman of Lithuania
- Paweł Maria Sapieha (1900–1987), he participated in the Polish–Soviet War
- Paweł Sapieha (1860–1934), traveler, first chairman of the Polish Red Cross
- Paweł Stefan Sapieha (1565–1635), Deputy Chancellor of Lithuania
- Róża Maria Sapieha (1921–1944), member of the Armia Krajowa, she participated in the Warsaw Uprising of 1944
- Stanisław Sapieha (1896–1919), defender of Lwów
- Teresa Sapieha (died c.1784), wife of Prince Hieronim Florian Radziwiłł and Count Joachim Karol Potocki
- Tomasz Sapieha (1598–1646), voivode of Wenden and of Nowogródek
- Władysław Leon Sapieha (1853–1920), landowner, social activist

== Palaces ==
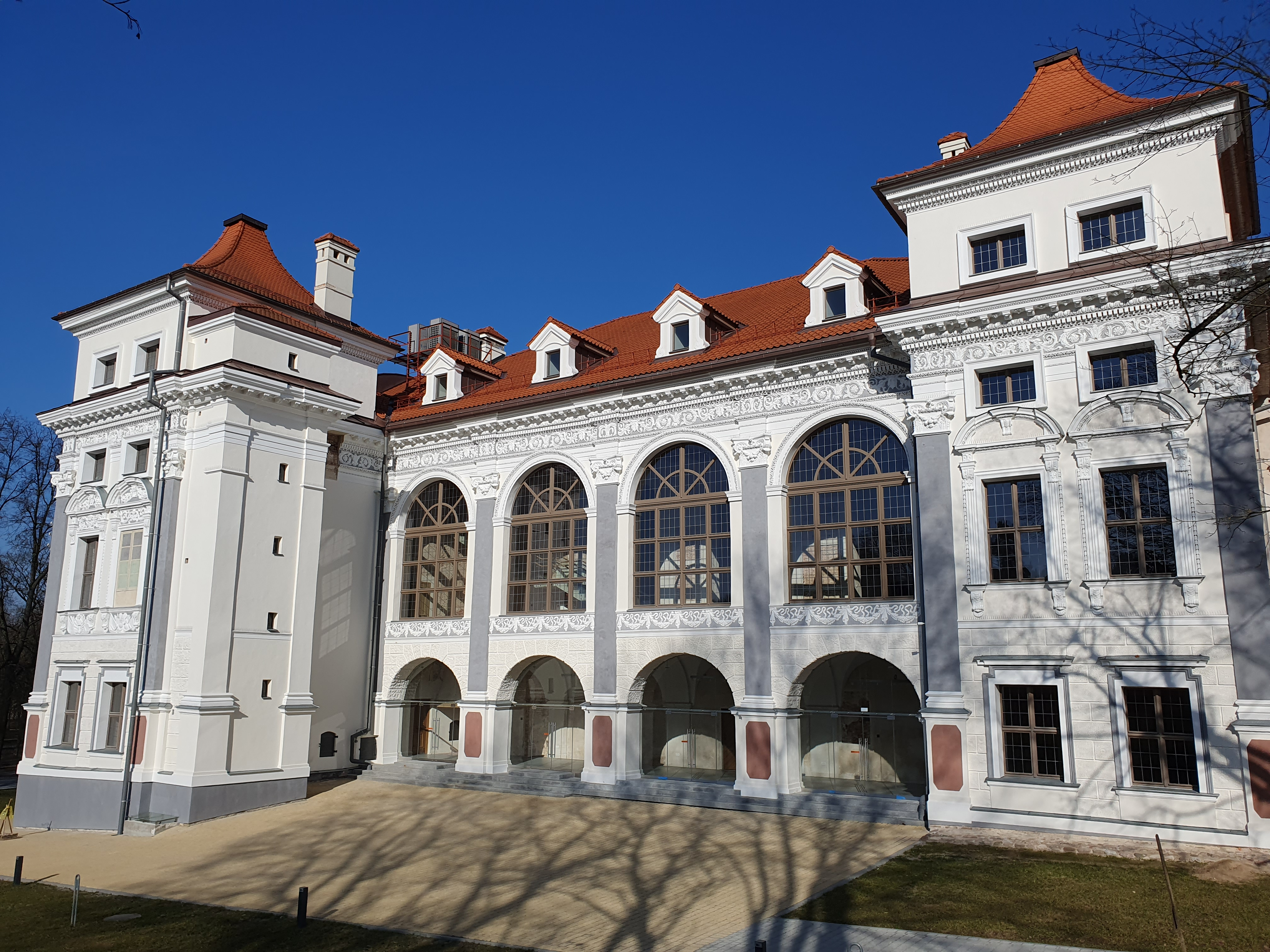
Sapieha Palace in Vilnius

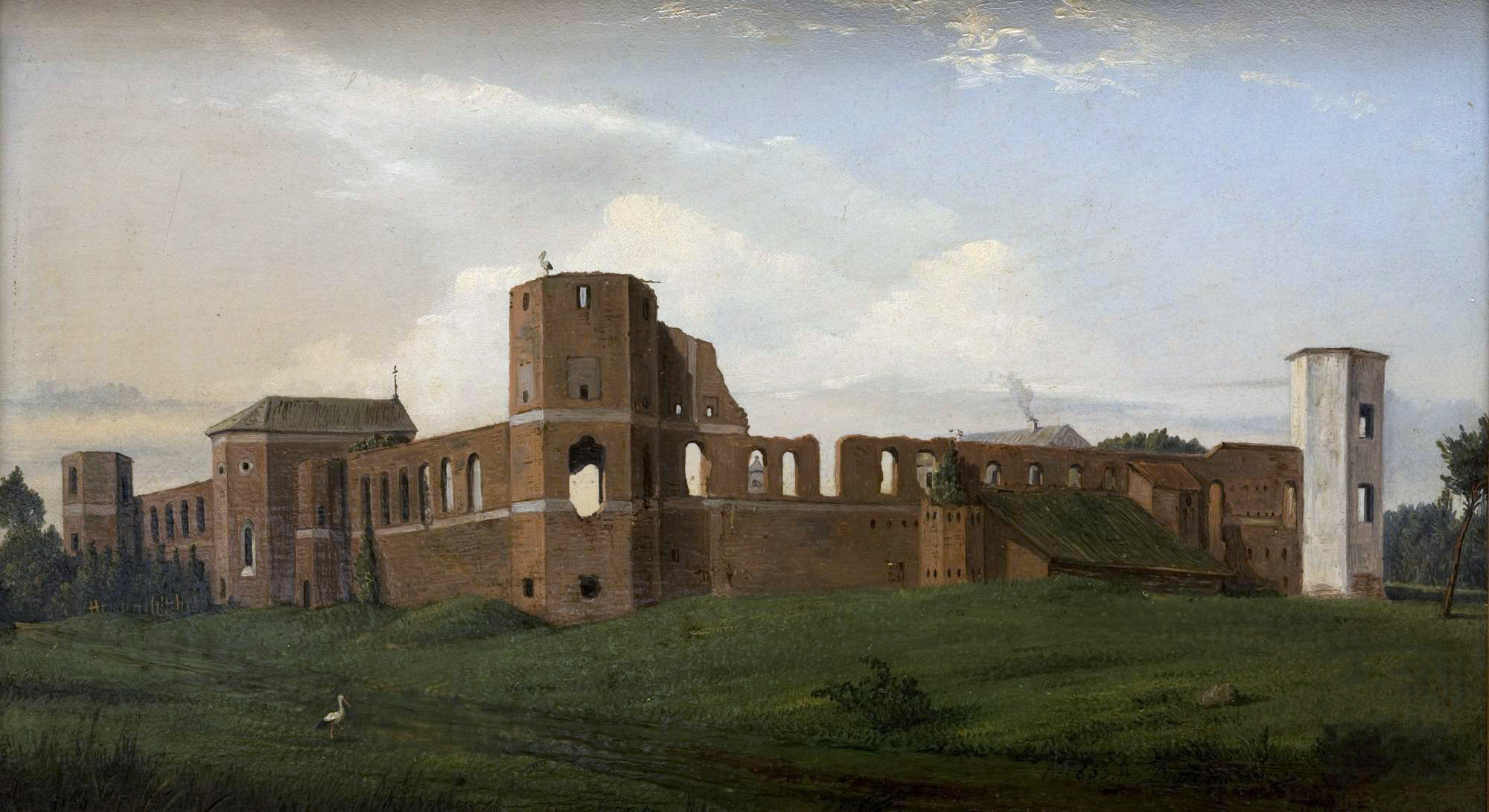
Ruins of the castle in Holszany (1853)

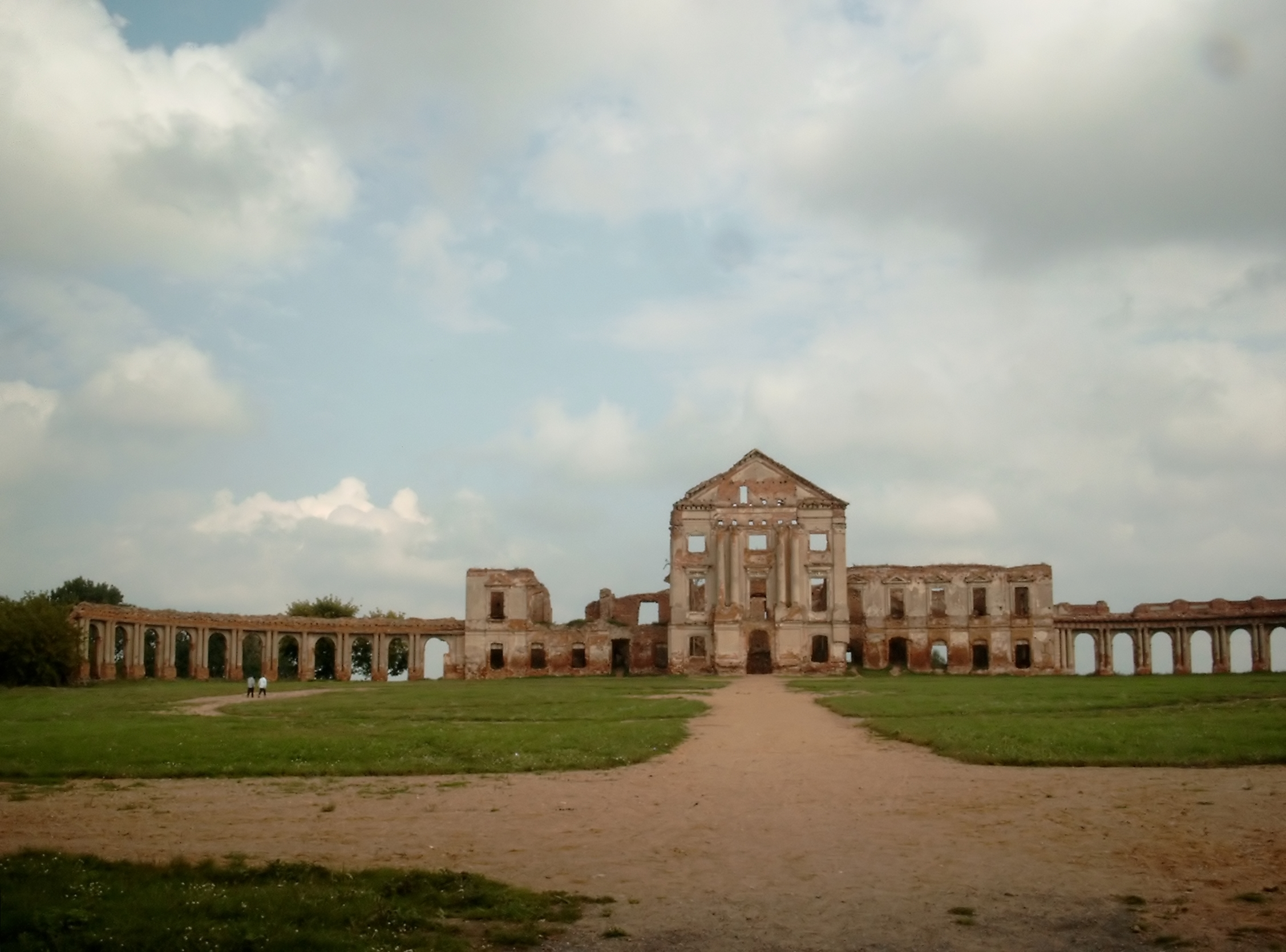
Palace of Aleksander Sapieha in Ružany

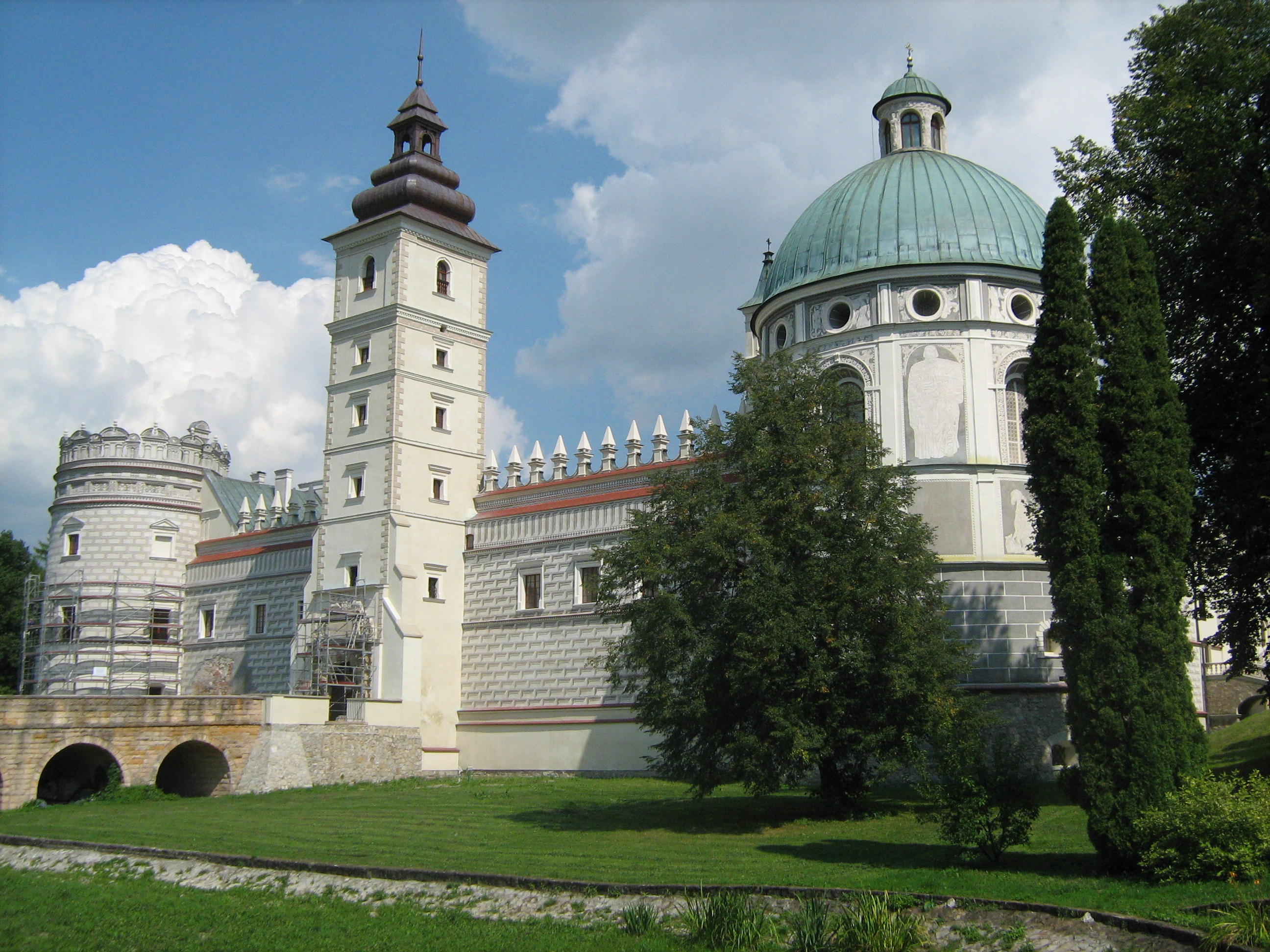
Castle of Krasicki and Sapieha in Krasiczyn

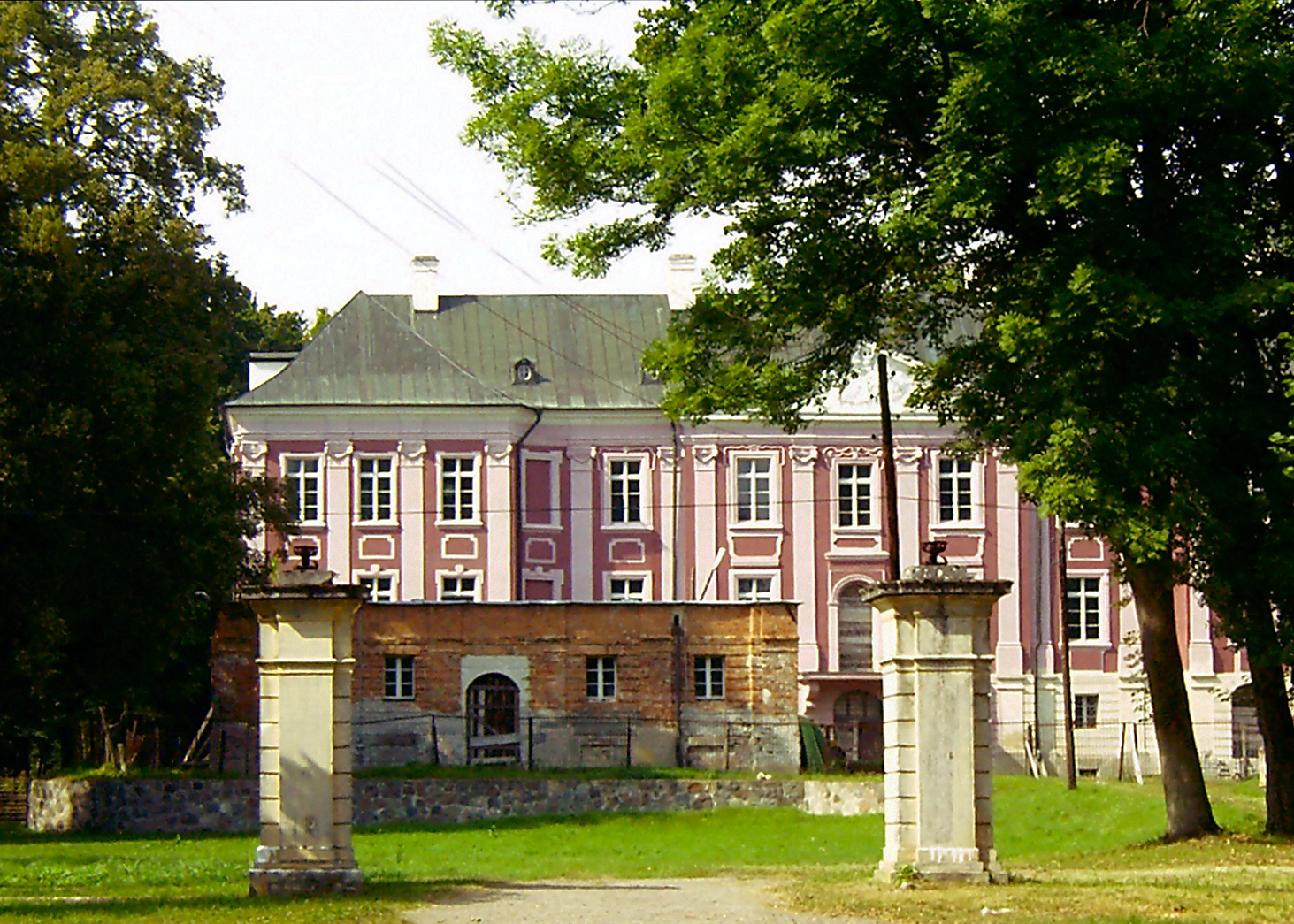
Sapieha Palace in Wieleń

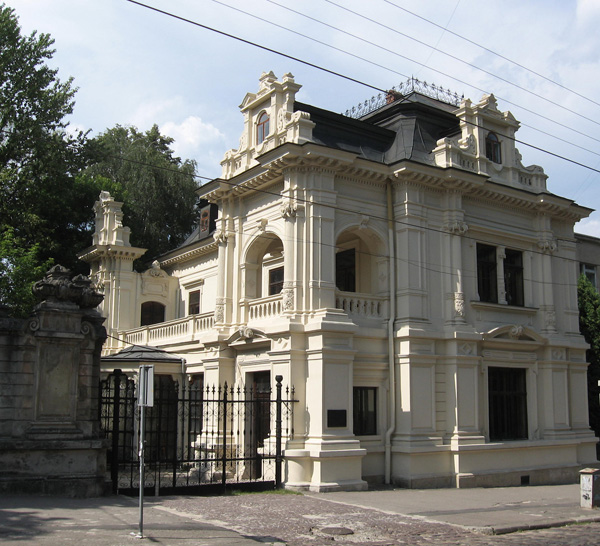
Sapieha Palace in Lviv

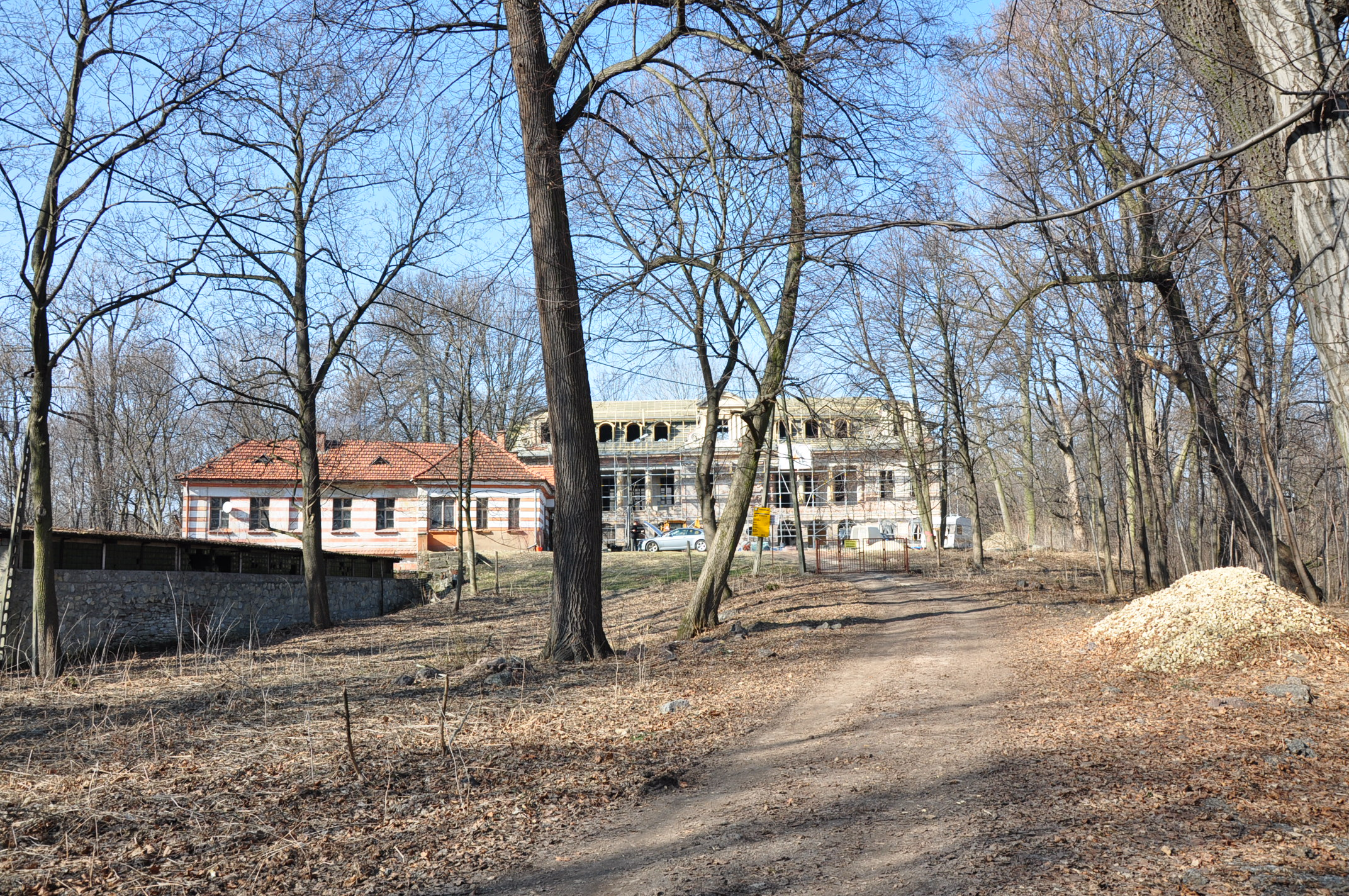
Palace in Bobrek

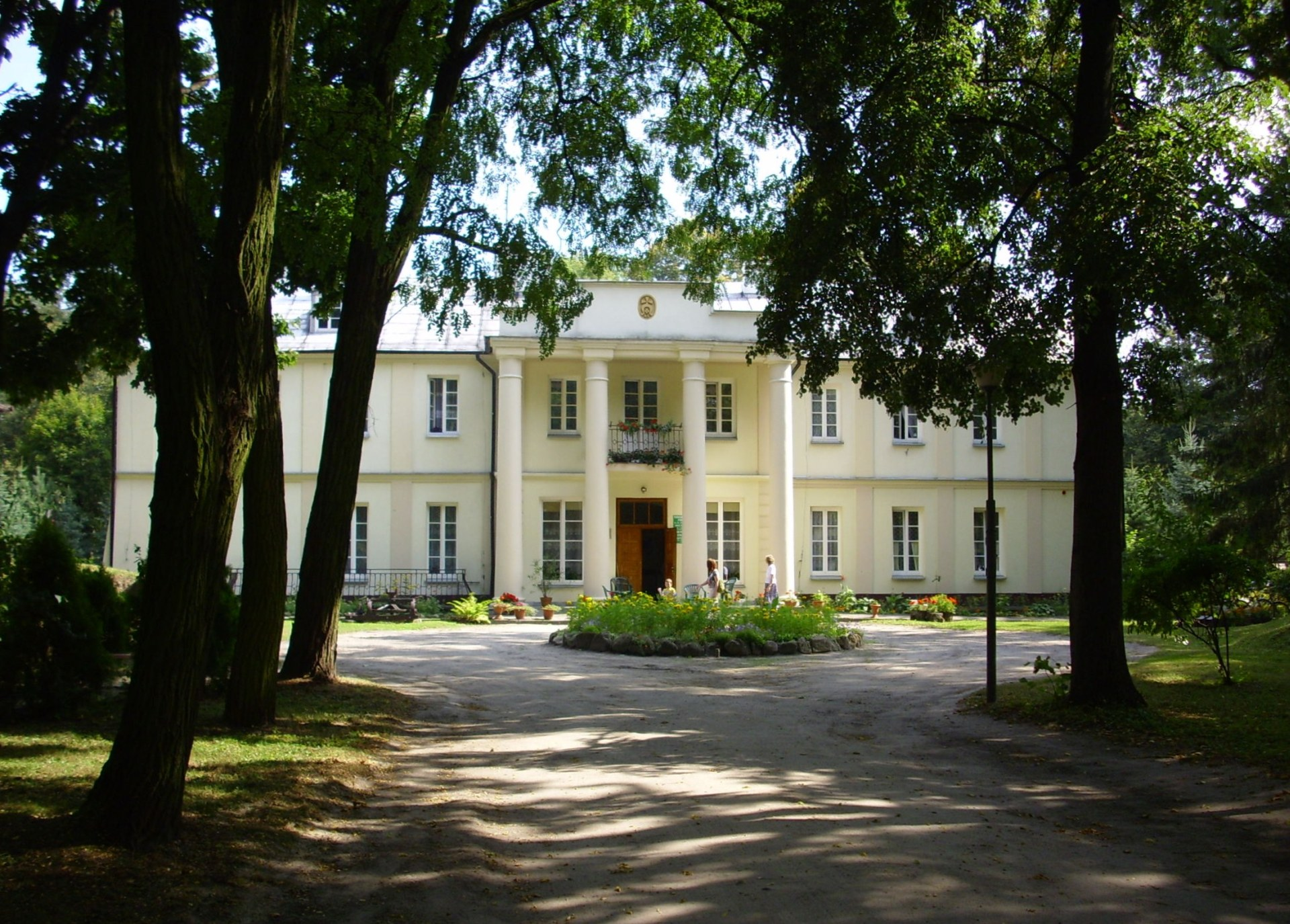
Palace "Placencja", summer residence in Kodeń

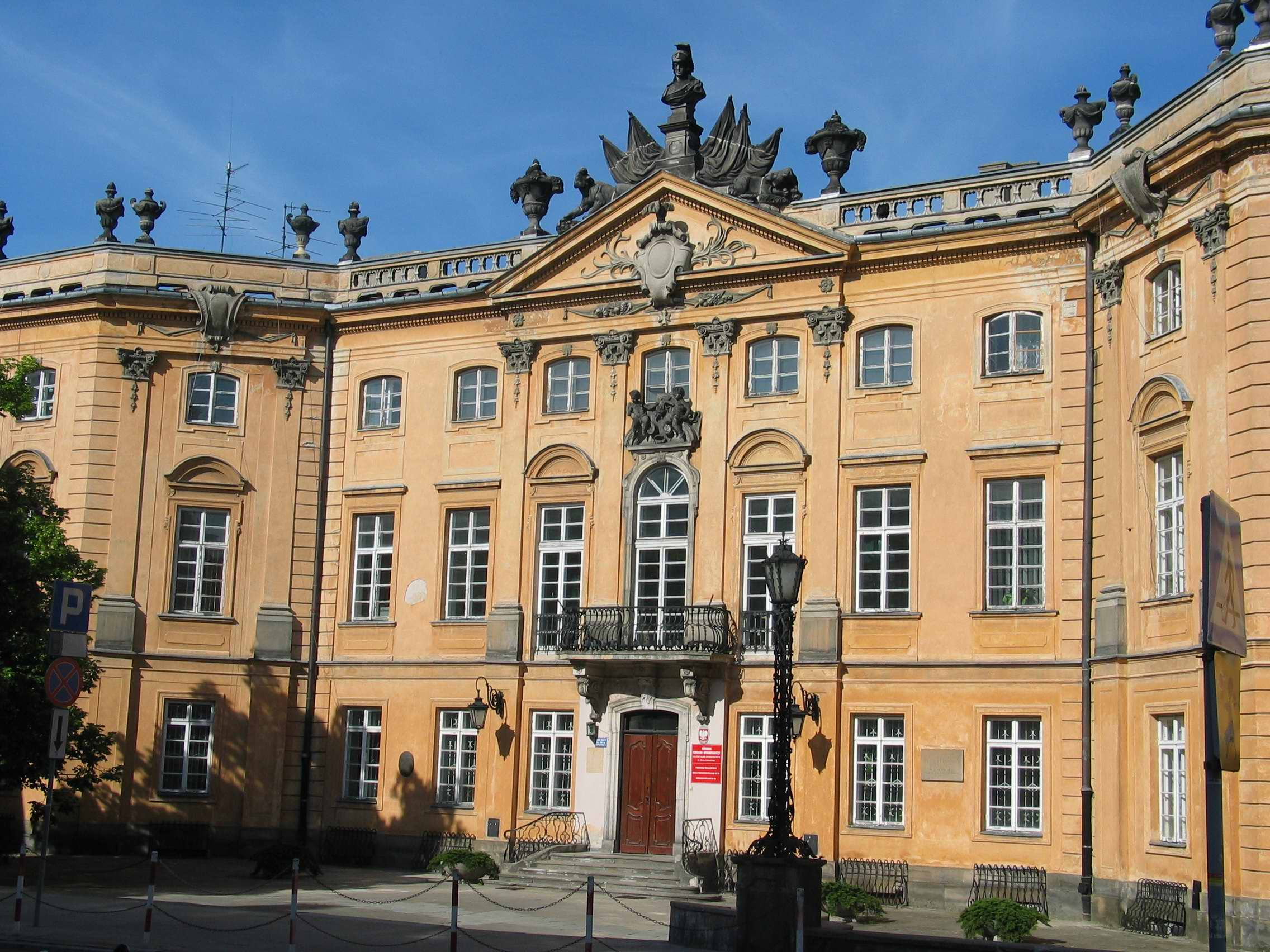
Palace of Jan Fryderyk Sapieha in Warsaw

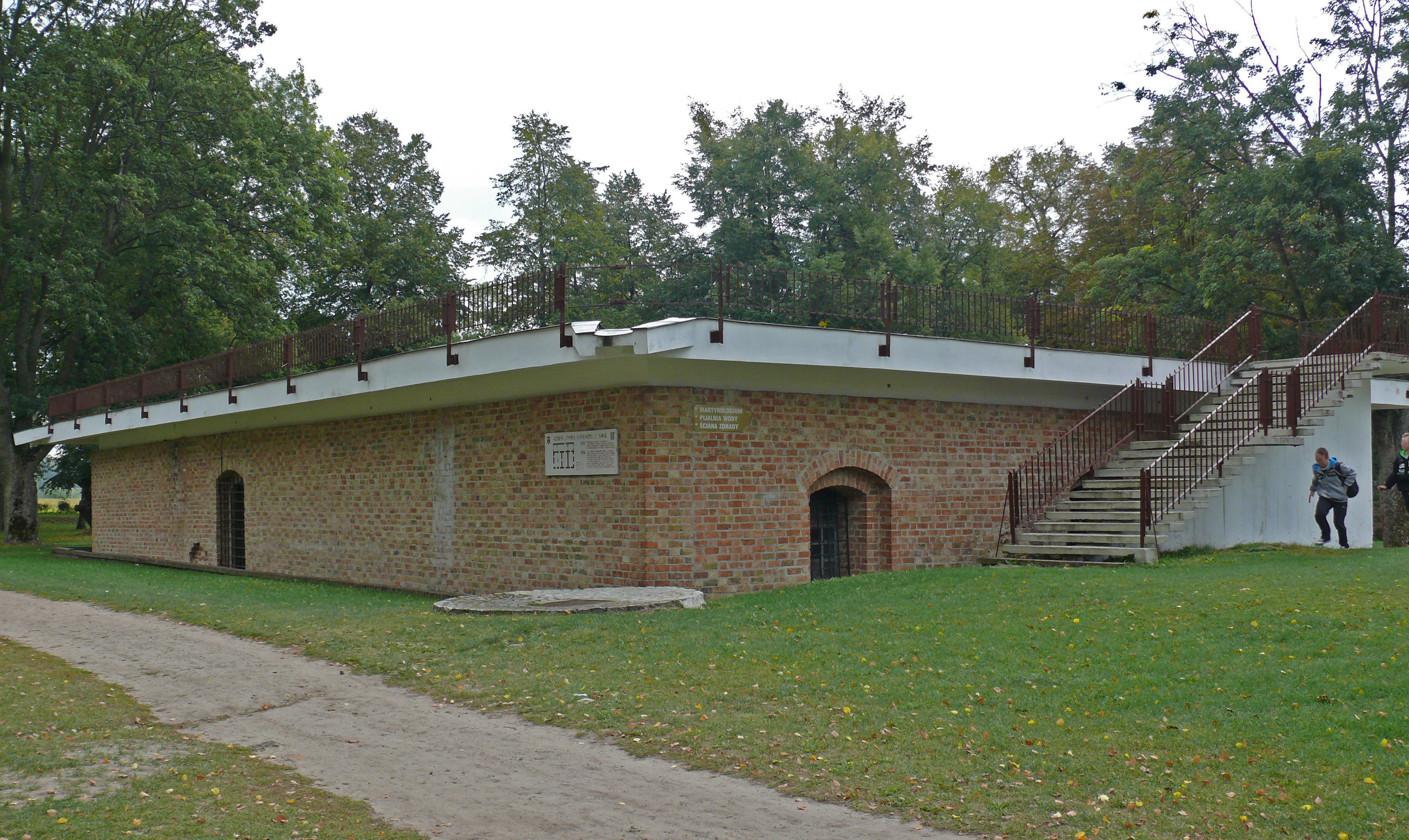
Remains of the castle in Kodeń

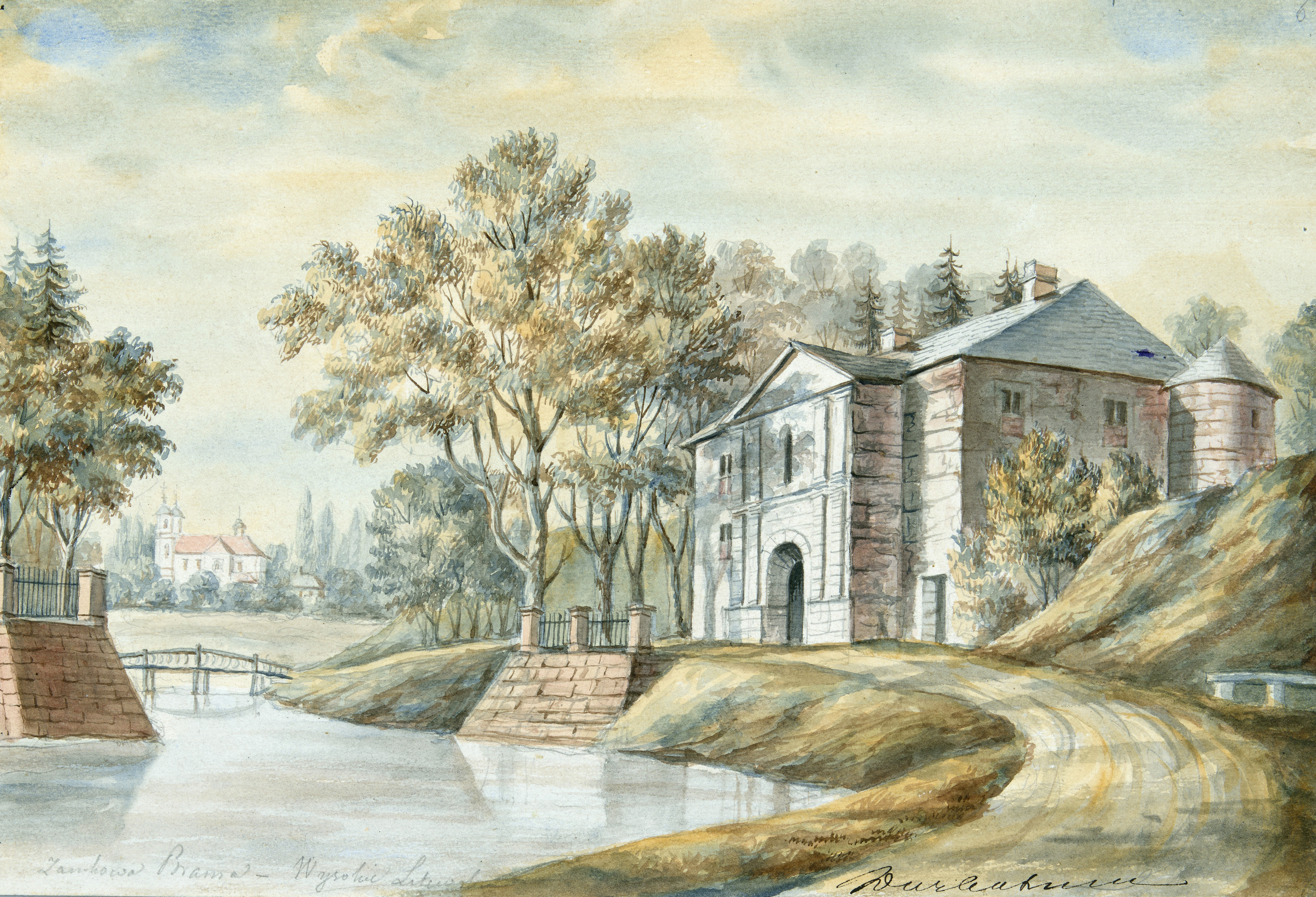
Castle in Wysokie

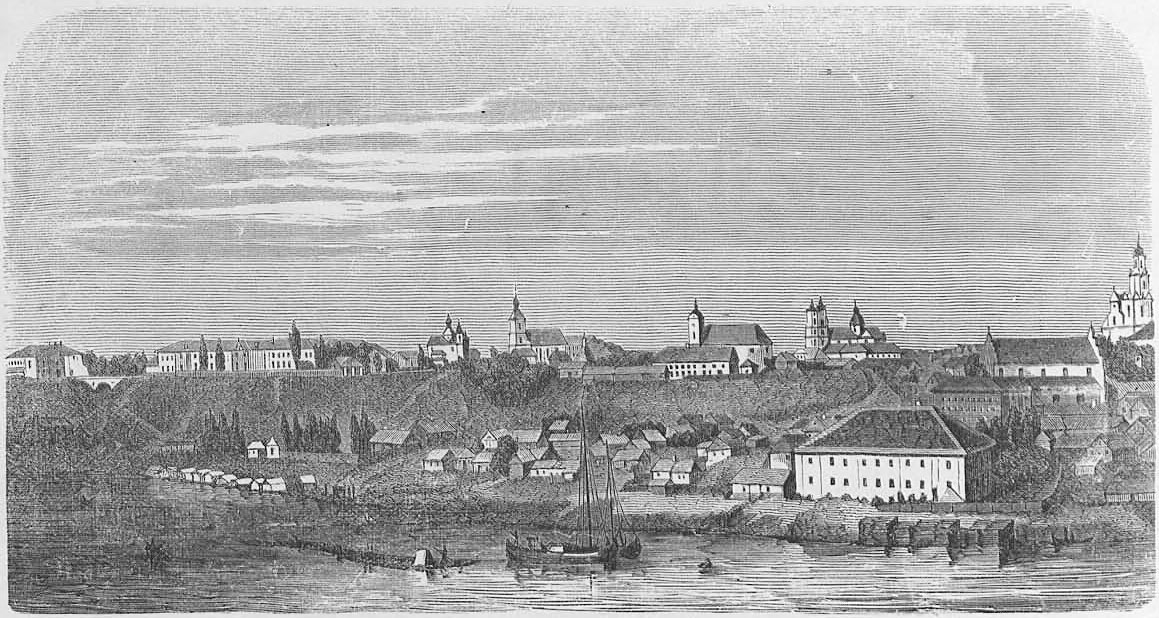
Palace in Grodno

== See also ==
- Ruzhany Palace
- Sapieha Palace in Vilnius
- Sapieha Palace in Warsaw
- Sapieha Palace in Lviv
- Polish nobility
- Belarusian nobility
- Lithuanian nobility
- List of szlachta
- Sapieha beaker

== Bibliography ==
- Labarre de Raillicourt, Dominique., Histoire des Sapieha (1440–1970), Paris, 1970
- Sapieha E., Dom Sapieżyński, Warszawa 1995. Numery /112 przy nazwiskach oznaczają numery biogramów w/w pozycji.
- Tłomacki A., "Sapiehowie Kodeńscy", nakładem własnym, Warszawa 2009
