= Sapieha Palace =

Sapieha Palace may refer to:

- Sapieha Palace, Lviv
- Sapieha Palace, Warsaw
- Sapieha Palace, Vilnius
