= Sapieha Palace, Warsaw =

Coordinates: 52°15′15″N 21°00′24″E

Sapieha Palace Pałac Sapiehów w Warszawie (in Polish)
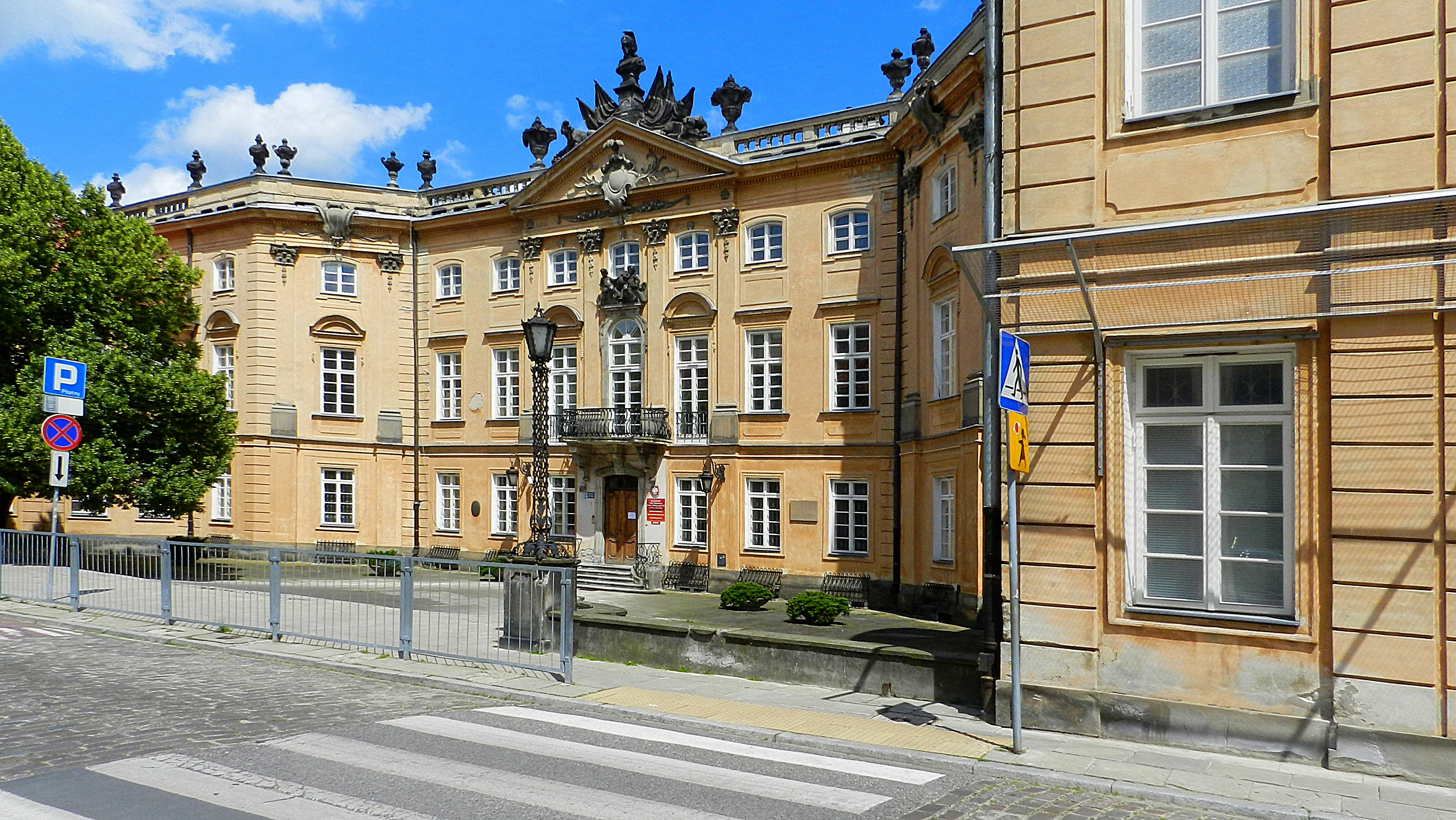
- Sapieha Palace today
- Interactive map of the Sapieha Palace; Pałac Sapiehów w Warszawie (in Polish) area

General information
- Architectural style: Rococo
- Location: Warsaw, Poland
- Construction started: 1731
- Completed: 1746
- Demolished: 1944

Design and construction
- Architect: Johann Sigmund Deybel

Historic Monument of Poland
- Designated: 1994-09-08
- Part of: Warsaw – historic city center with the Royal Route and Wilanów
- Reference no.: M.P. 1994 nr 50 poz. 423

Sapieha Palace (Polish: pałac Sapiehów w Warszawie) is one of the palaces in Warsaw New Town district of Warsaw, Poland. Started by the powerful Sapieha family who gave the name to the building, it currently houses the Environmental Protection School Complex.

== History ==
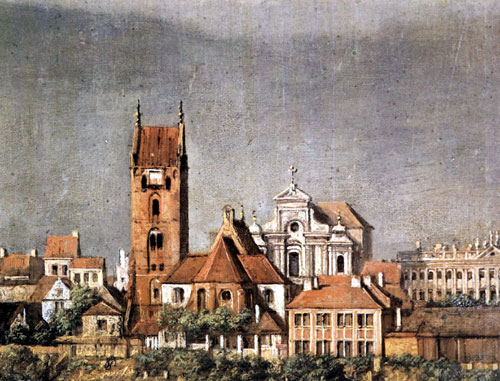
The palace visible on the right of St. Mary's Church, detail of a painting by Bernardo Bellotto, 1770.

=== 18th century ===
The palace, commissioned by Jan Fryderyk Sapieha, Chancellor of the Grand Duchy of Lithuania, was built in Rococo style in 1731-1746 by Johann Sigmund Deybel. It was constructed as a French-style city palace, so-called Hôtel particulier. At that time it consisted of five-axial main buildings (corps de logis) and two outbuildings between the palace and a street. Between 1741 and 1742 the existing one-story outbuilding was connected with the main outbuilding of the palace complex, and between 1771 and 1790 another wing was erected to connect the inhabited corps de logis with the second outbuilding.

=== 19th century ===
In 1818–1820 the palace was converted into the Sapieha Barracks (Koszary sapieżyńskie) for the use of the army. The Neo-Classical remodelling in the early 19th century was the work of Wilhelm Henryk Minter. During the November Uprising of 1830–1831 it served as the barracks for the famous Polish 4th Infantry Regiment (Czwartacy).

=== 20th century ===
Destroyed in 1944 by German occupying forces, it was rebuilt in the 1950s by Maria Zachwatowiczowa.

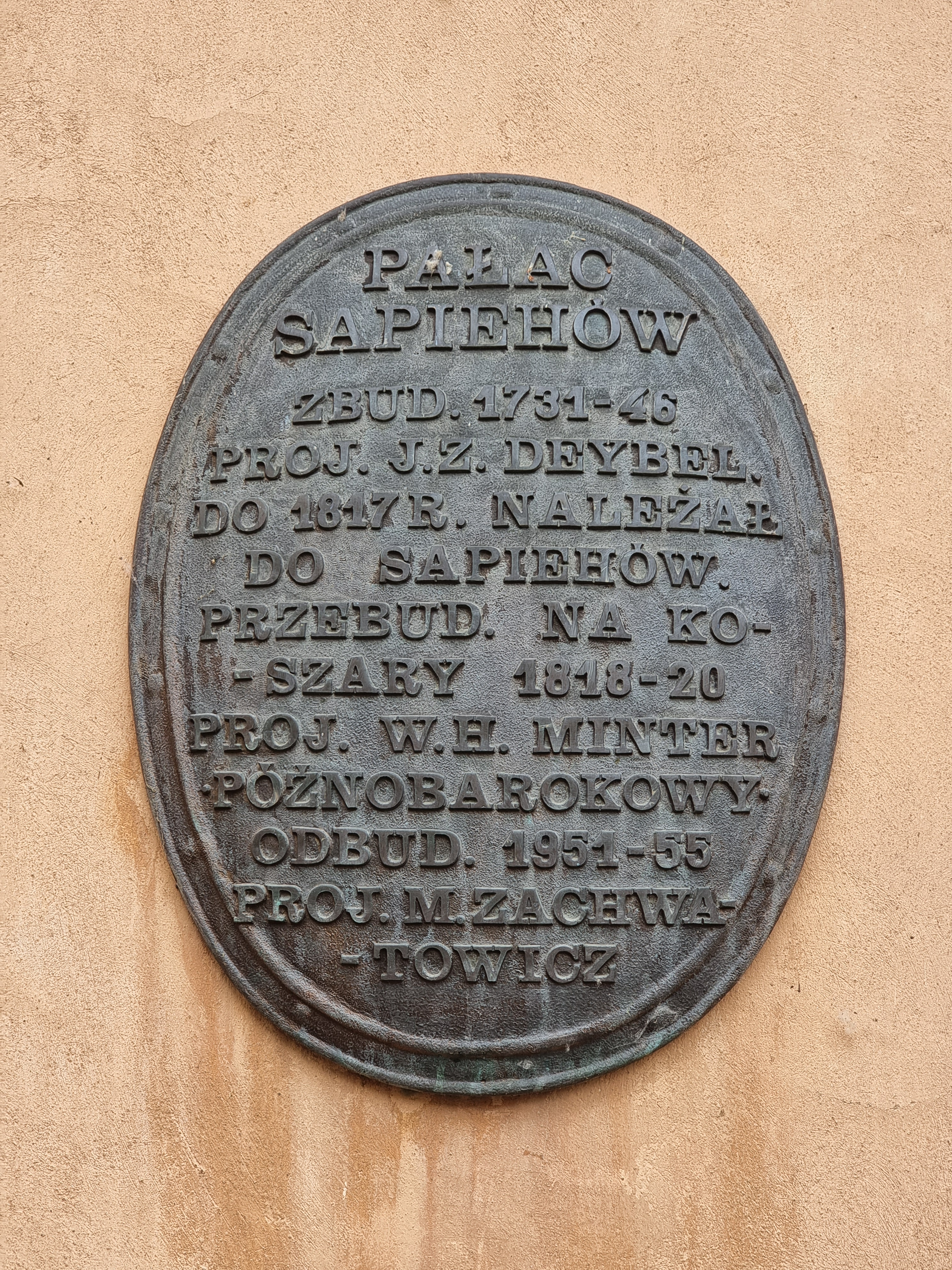
The explanatory plaque on the façade (in Polish)

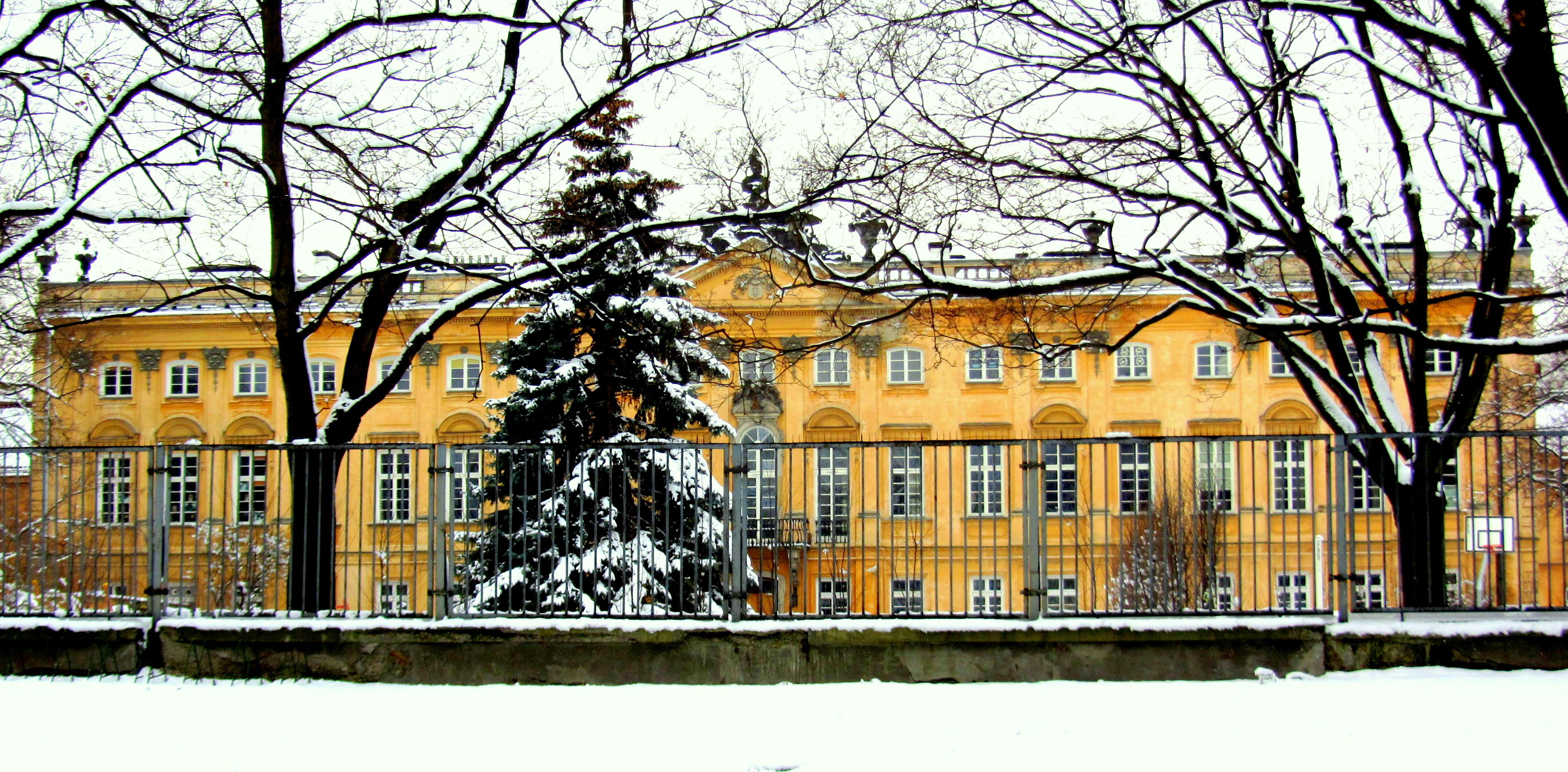
Former garden elevation

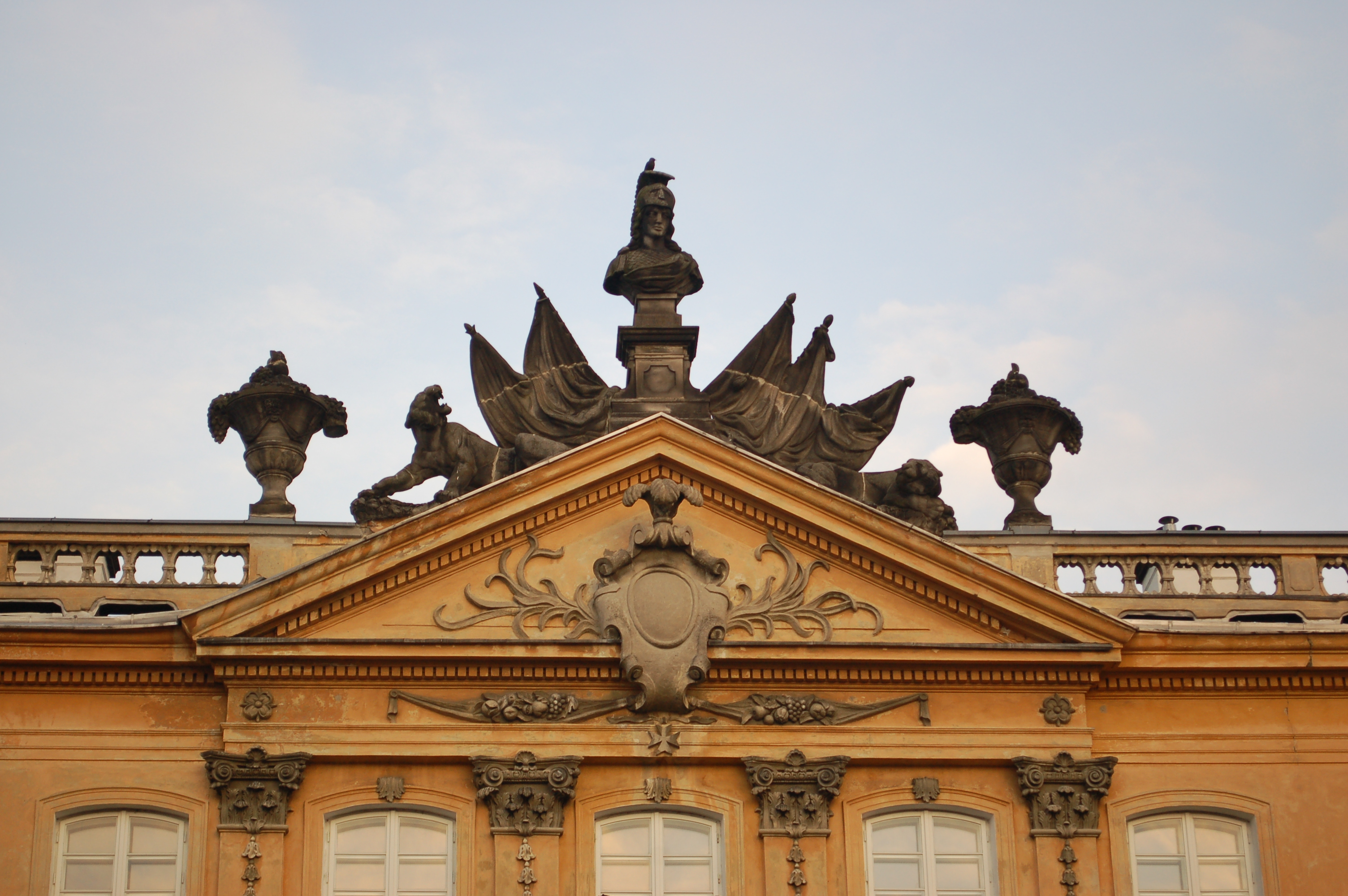
A close-up of the coat of arms at the roof above the entrance

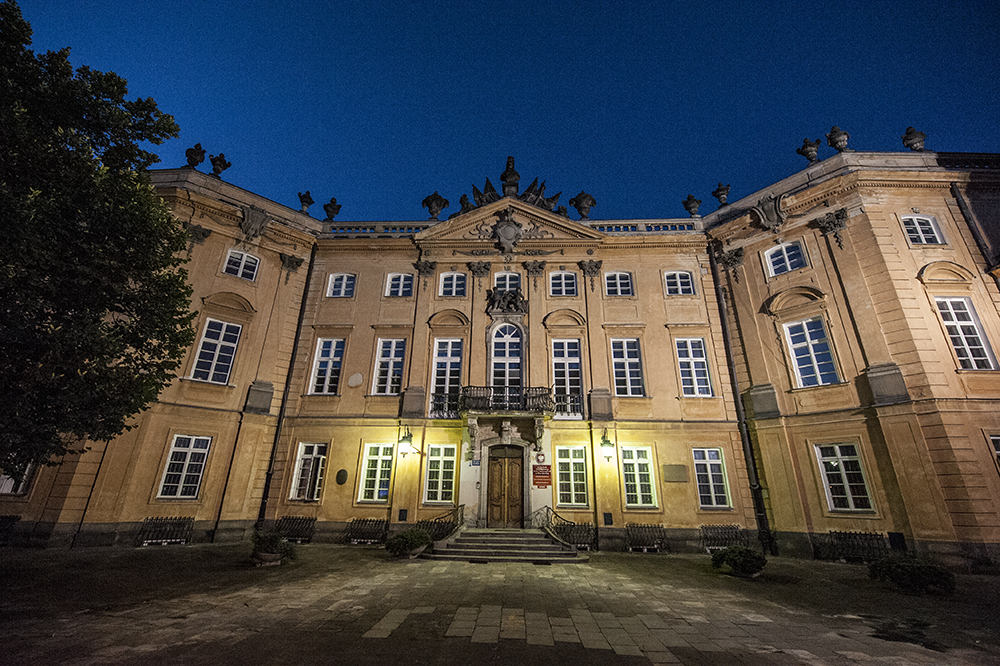
The front of the Palace at dusk - July 2011

== See also ==
- Sapieha Palace, Lviv
- Sapieha Palace, Vilnius
