= Sapieha beaker =

16th-century beaker

The silver Sapieha beaker is a 16th-century beaker, which originally belonged to Grygor Sapieha and was made in the Grand Duchy of Lithuania. The Sapieha family played an important role in Lithuania's history through much of the 16th century. In 2007 the beaker was auctioned at Christie's London for £132,500. At the time the purchaser remained anonymous.

== Beaker ==
The unmarked silver part gilt beaker was made in the Grand Duchy of Lithuania around 1560. Its height is 19.7 centimetres (7.8 in) and total weight is 550 grams (19 oz). The beaker's form is a waisted cylinder with flared lip; the border to the flat base is engraved with gilded foliage and encircled by two mystical animals, which resemble serpents. Their scaly tails coil round a moon-shaped face, their bodies engraved with inscription and with foliage at the points they cross. The early Slavonic language inscription reads: This cup was made for master Gregory of Orsha, for friendship to those who drink from it for the good of their souls, in the year 1560, the month of March, on the first day. The beaker is also engraved with a heart-shaped pendant and double cross. Christie's experts suggest that an early version of Sapieha's coat of arms is depicted on the beaker.

It is believed that the beaker belonged to Grygor Sapieha, younger brother of Lew Sapieha. Likely this beaker was presented as a christening present. Later the beaker changed hands and in the early 20th century it finally appeared in the collection of Eugéne Lubovitch. The Sapieha beaker was exhibited in a number of venues, including "L'Art Russe: Exposition d'Icones et d'Orfévreries Russes", 1931 (Brussels and Ghent); "Argenterie Russe Ancienne de la Collection Eugéne Lubovitch", 1932 (Paris); "Exhibition of Russian Art", 1935 (London). In 1978 it was auctioned at Sotheby's Zürich. In 2007 the beaker was sold at Christie's for £132,500 (US$274,408), to an anonymous buyer.

== Gift to Lithuania ==
In June 2008 it was revealed that it had been bought by the Belgian businessmen brothers Ortiz, founders of IKI supermarkets (Palink), who have been living in Lithuania for close to twenty years. On June 12, 2008, George, Oliver and Nicolas Ortiz presented the beaker to Lithuania's president Valdas Adamkus as a gift to Lithuania. The presentation ceremony was held in the Presidential Palace, Vilnius. Adamkus thanked the brothers and noted that "A historic relic, a beaker of the 16th century, comes back to Lithuania. This means that Lithuania becomes richer, more spiritually than financially". The Head of State added that "In the years of occupation, cultural wealth was pillaged off museums, churches and archives; therefore, every testimony of history that comes back to Lithuania is exceptional to us". Brothers Ortiz asked that the beaker be displayed publicly so that the people of Lithuania could have access to it. The beaker was placed in the custody of the Lithuanian Art Museum, and will be exhibited in the Royal Palace of Lithuania.
