= Bohdan Sapieha =

Bohdan Sapieha may refer to one of noblemen of Polish-Lithuanian Commonwealth:

- Bohdan Semenowicz Sapieha (1450–1512)
- Bohdan Pawłowicz Sapieha (died 1593)
- Bohdan Fiodorowicz Sapieha (died 1599/1603)
