= Bohdan Fiodorowicz Sapieha =

Polish-Lithuanian nobleman

Sapieha Lis coat of arms

Bohdan Fiodorowicz Sapieha (died between 1599 and 1603) was a nobleman of Polish-Lithuanian Commonwealth of Sapieha family, of Lis coat of arms, of Ruthenian origin.

He was Hospodar's dvoryanin (Polish: dworzanin hospodarski) and rewizor hospodarski (inspector of Hospodar's estates) since 1576 or 1577 he was iudex terrestris (land judge) of Trakai lands, serving for over 20 years, until resignation due to age and health.

He was son of Fiodor Bohdanowicz Sapieha and Maryna Lemkowna, younger brother of Dymitr Sapieha, cousin of Paweł Sapieha (kasztelan of Kiev), and grandson of Bohdan Semenowicz Sapieha. From his marriage with Katarzyna Kuncowna (or Kuncewiczowna) he had son Jan and (probably two) daughters, Anna and Zofia.

He was of Orthodox faith.
