= 4th Line Infantry Regiment (Congress Poland) =

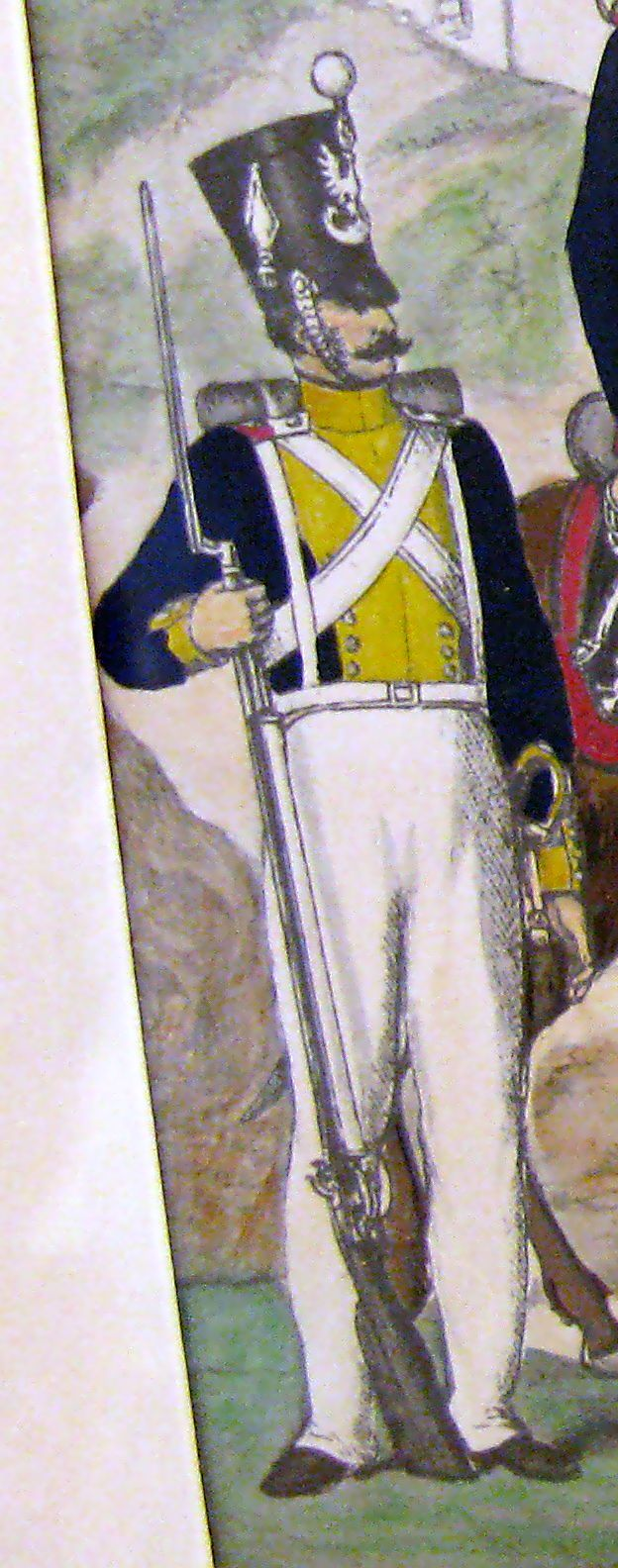
Soldiers of the 4th Regiment wore navy blue uniforms with characteristic yellow facings inherited from the Napoleonic-era

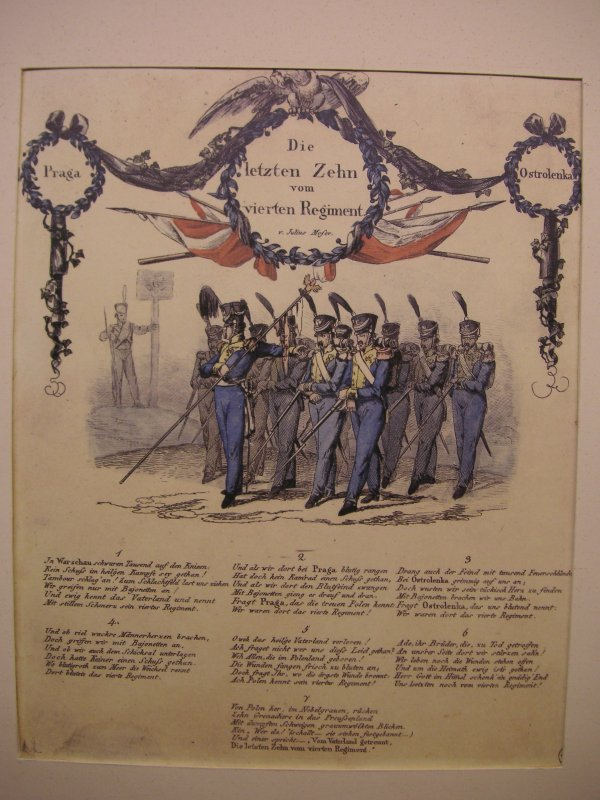
A German contemporary poem glorifying the actions of the 4th Regiment in the battle of Ostrołęka

The 4th Line Infantry Regiment (Polish: 4. pułk piechoty liniowej) was a regiment of the Kingdom of Poland. Formed in 1815, the regiment distinguished itself in the battles of the November Uprising and remains one of the best-known units of the Polish Army of the era. The soldiers of the regiment are known in Polish historical works as the Czwartacy.

== History ==
The regiment was directly descended from the Napoleonic Duchy of Warsaw's 4th Infantry Regiment. After Napoleon lost control of Poland in 1812, the regiment remained loyal to the emperor and fought in battles of Leipzig and Arcis-sur-Aube. After his abdication and exile to the Island of Elba, the remnants of the regiment returned to Russian-controlled Kingdom of Poland with their regimental flags, swore an oath to the Russian Tsar and became the cadre of a newly-formed infantry regiment with the same number. Their old regimental flag was retired and is preserved in the Warsaw-based Polish Army Museum.

Like its predecessor, the new regiment was based in Warsaw and its main barracks were in the Sapieha Palace. The regiment was recruited in and around Warsaw from a broad cross-section of society including noblemen (szlachta), burghers, and many serfs and peasants.

Because of the proximity of the barracks to the Grand Duke Konstantin Pavlovich's palace, the 4th Regiment became one of his favourite military units and its soldiers enjoyed the status of his personal guard. This meant that the Grand Duke, very fond of his military units, while also cruel and brutal in their treatment, would march the regiment's soldiers days and nights, in every weather. The maltreated regiment's morale was low, yet any sign of discontent was brutally repressed: among those punished was the regiment's Major, a freemason, Walerian Łukasiński. Denounced as the founder of a secret society, he was sentenced to seven years of imprisonment, but eventually was held without trial for 46 years in Russian prisons, most of that in solitary confinement.

=== November Uprising ===
Following the outbreak of the November Uprising, the regiment rebelled against the Russian Tsar together with most of the army of the Kingdom of Poland. It fought from the very first day of the uprising and distinguished itself in the First and Second Battle of Wawer, as well as the battles of Dębe Wielkie, Ostrołęka and the final Battle of Warsaw.

== Nicknames ==
Officially named the "4th Line Infantry Regiment", the soldiers of the new unit continued to use the nickname of Czwartacy ("Men of the Fourth"), which had achieved some notoriety.

During the uprising the unit also was often referred to as "Tysiąc Walecznych" ("A Thousand Brave Men") both by the press and general populace. This nickname was popularised in Europe by a German poet Julius Mosen, who published in 1832 a popular poem idealising the regiment and its actions during the war of 1830-1831.

== Decorations ==
During the November Uprising, the regiment received 214 Virtuti Militari crosses: five 3rd class, 55 fourth class and 154 fifth class. This made it one of the most highly decorated Polish units of the epoch.

== Regimental commanding officers ==
- Ignacy Mycielski
- Col. Ludwik Bogusławski (1818 - 1820)
- Lt.Col. Wit Czajkowski, (1818, again from 18 March 1831)
- Lt.Col. Stanisław Kindler (from 17 April 1831)
- Lt.Col. Klemens Jórski (from 22 April 1831)
- Lt.Col. Kazimierz Majewski (from 20 June 1831)
- Lt.Col. Józef Borzęcki (from 22 September 1831)
- Józef Święcicki
