= Walerian Łukasiński =

Polish officer and political activist

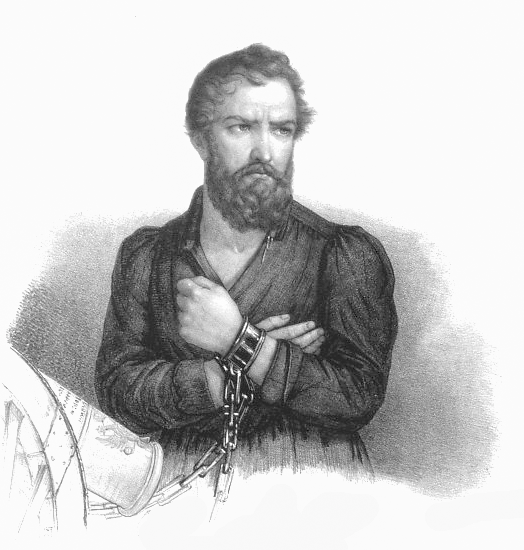
Walerian Łukasiński on a 19th-century lithograph, made in Paris.

Walerian Łukasiński (15 April 1786 in Warsaw – 27 January 1868 in Shlisselburg) was a Polish officer and political activist. He was sentenced by Russian Imperial authorities to 14 years' imprisonment. He died after 46 years of solitary incarceration. He became a symbol of the Polish struggle for independence.

== Biography ==
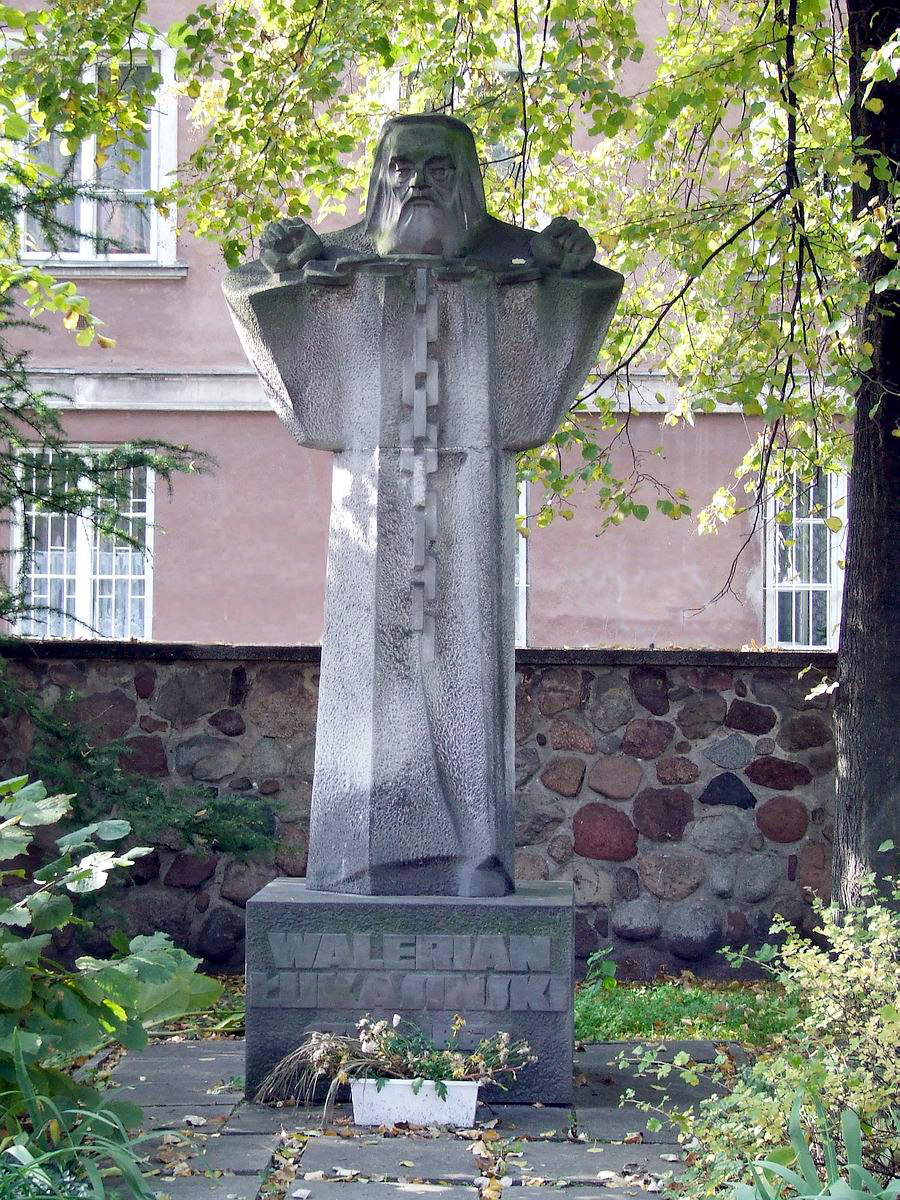
Monument in Warsaw dedicated to Łukasiński

Born in Warsaw on 15 April 1786, as a child he lived through the last of the partitions of Poland that destroyed the Polish–Lithuanian Commonwealth. He joined the Polish military, serving in the army of Duchy of Warsaw from 1807 to 1815 and later in that of Congress Poland. In Congress Poland, a puppet state of the Russian Empire, ruled by the Grand Duke Constantine Pavlovich of Russia, the Polish army's morale was low. Łukasiński, who reached the rank of a major in the 4th Regiment of Line Infantry, created a secret organization known as National Freemasonry (Wolnomularstwo Narodowe), which existed from 1819 to 1820 and successfully raised morale. In 1818 Łukasiński published "Reflections of an Army Officer Concerning the Need of Organizing the Jews". In 1820 he formally disbanded National Freemasonry and replaced it by another secret organization, Patriotic Society (Towarzystwo Patriotyczne). Its goal was to influence public opinion and improve the lot of peasants and Jews.

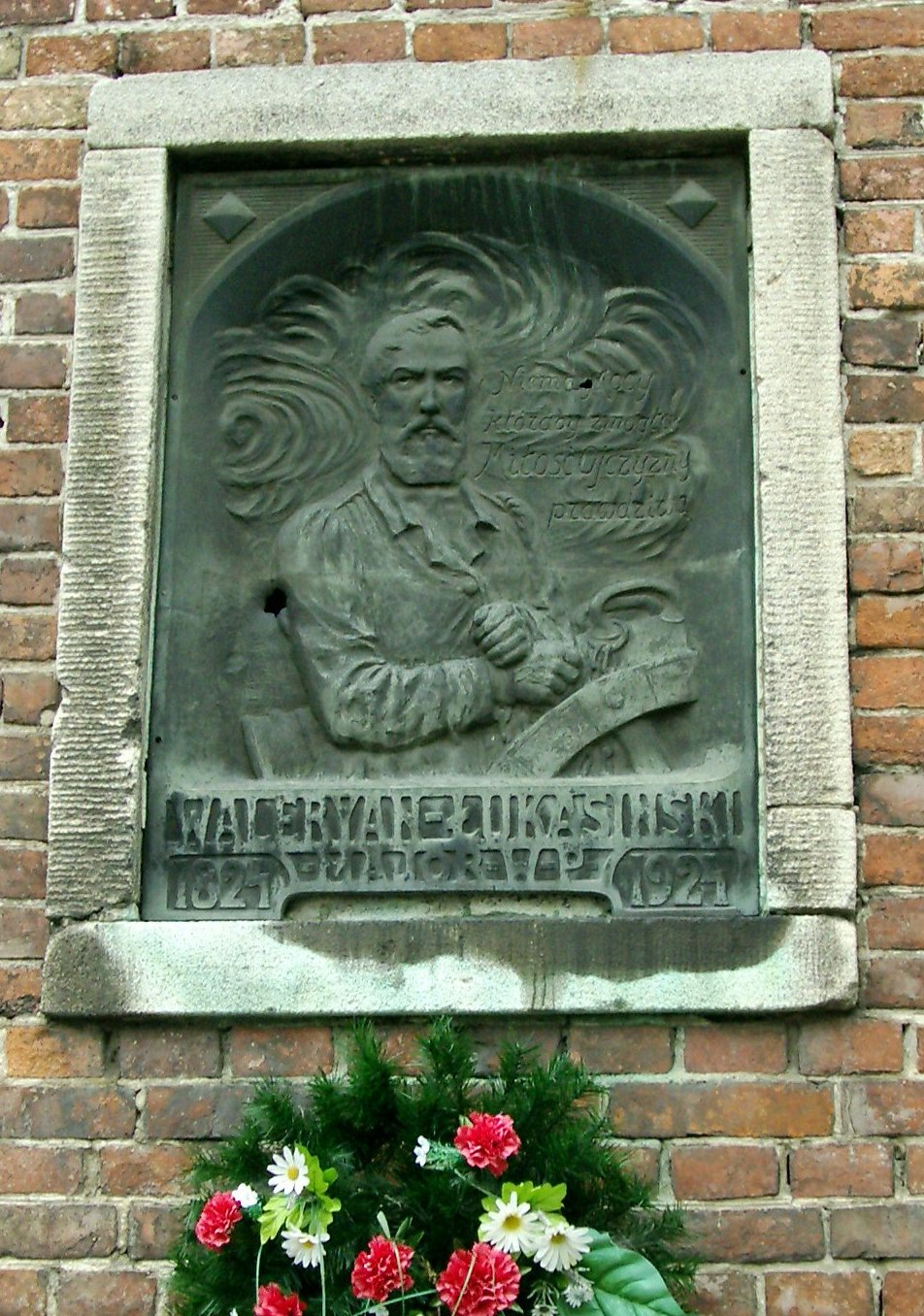
Memorial tablet in Zamość dedicated to Łukasiński

He was arrested by the Russian authorities and sentenced to 7 years of hard labour in Zamość. For participation in the prisoners revolt against inhumane conditions, he was accused of being one of the ringleaders and his sentence was doubled to 14 years.

After the November Uprising, Tsar Nicholas I of Russia became convinced that Łukasiński was one of the main activists of the Polish underground and he was moved to a secure facility in Warsaw. During the November Uprising (1830–1831) he was taken with the Russian troops retreating from Warsaw and put in a Russian prison, the Shlisselburg Fortress. Most of the commanders of the Shlisselburg prison were kept unaware of the identity of the prisoner. One of the few people who, at that time, managed to communicate with Łukasiński, was Russian revolutionary Mikhail Bakunin, who was also imprisoned in Shlisselburg for several years. A few years before his death, after the death of Tsar Nicholas, a commander of the prison successfully petitioned Tsar Alexander II of Russia about improving his condition; Łukasiński was moved to a more comfortable cell above ground, where he was given new clothing and furniture and allowed to inquire about events outside and keep a diary.

== Influence ==
Known as the "iron major," he became one of the martyrs of Polish culture and Poland's struggle for independence in the 19th and 20th centuries. Among the works of literature inspired by him, the most famous is Stanisław Wyspiański's Noc Listopadowa ("November Night").

In 2018 Roman Turovsky-Savchuk composed a tombeau in honor of Łukasiński.
