= Sopieszyno =

Village in Kashubia

Sopieszyno Sopieszëno
- Village
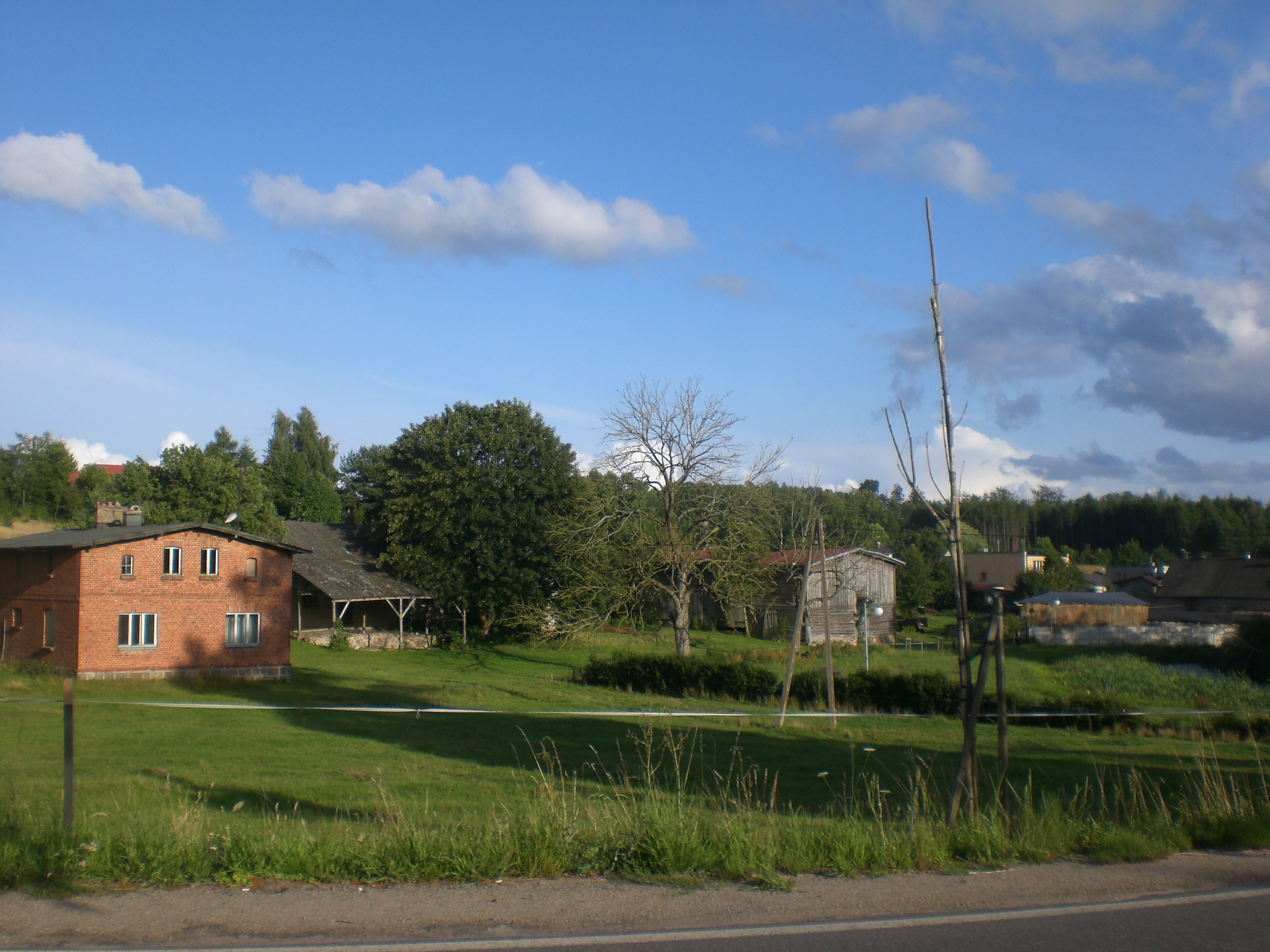

- Location within Poland
- Coordinates: 54°32′51″N 18°13′36″E
- Country: Poland
- Voivodeship: Pomeranian
- County: Wejherowo
- Gmina: Wejherowo
- Population: 670

Sopieszyno [sɔpjɛˈʂɨnɔ] (Kashubian: Sopieszëno) is a village in the administrative district of Gmina Wejherowo, within Wejherowo County, Pomeranian Voivodeship, in northern Poland.

For details of the history of the region, see History of Pomerania.
