= Jan Fryderyk Sapieha =

Polish-Lithuanian nobleman

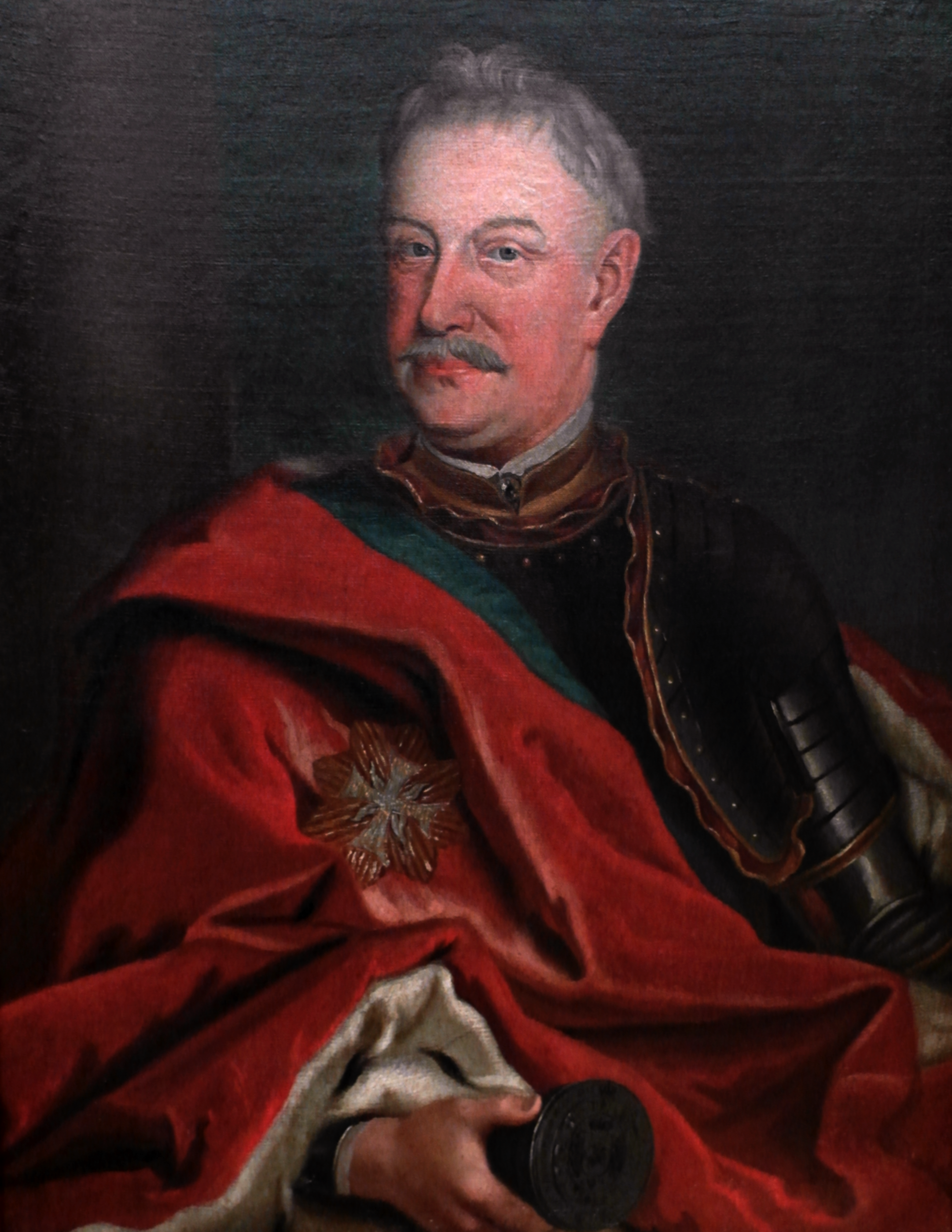
Jan Fryderyk Sapieha

Jan Fryderyk Sapieha (Lithuanian: Jonas Frederikas Sapiega) (18 October 1680 in Dobratycze – 6 July 1751 in Łysowodach) was a Polish-Lithuanian nobleman, Grand Recorder of Lithuania between 1706 and 1709, since 1716 – the castellan of Trakai and after 1735 – the Grand Chancellor of Lithuania. He was married to Konstancja Radziwiłł.
