= Sapieha Palace, Lviv =

Coordinates: 49°50′10″N 24°01′19″E

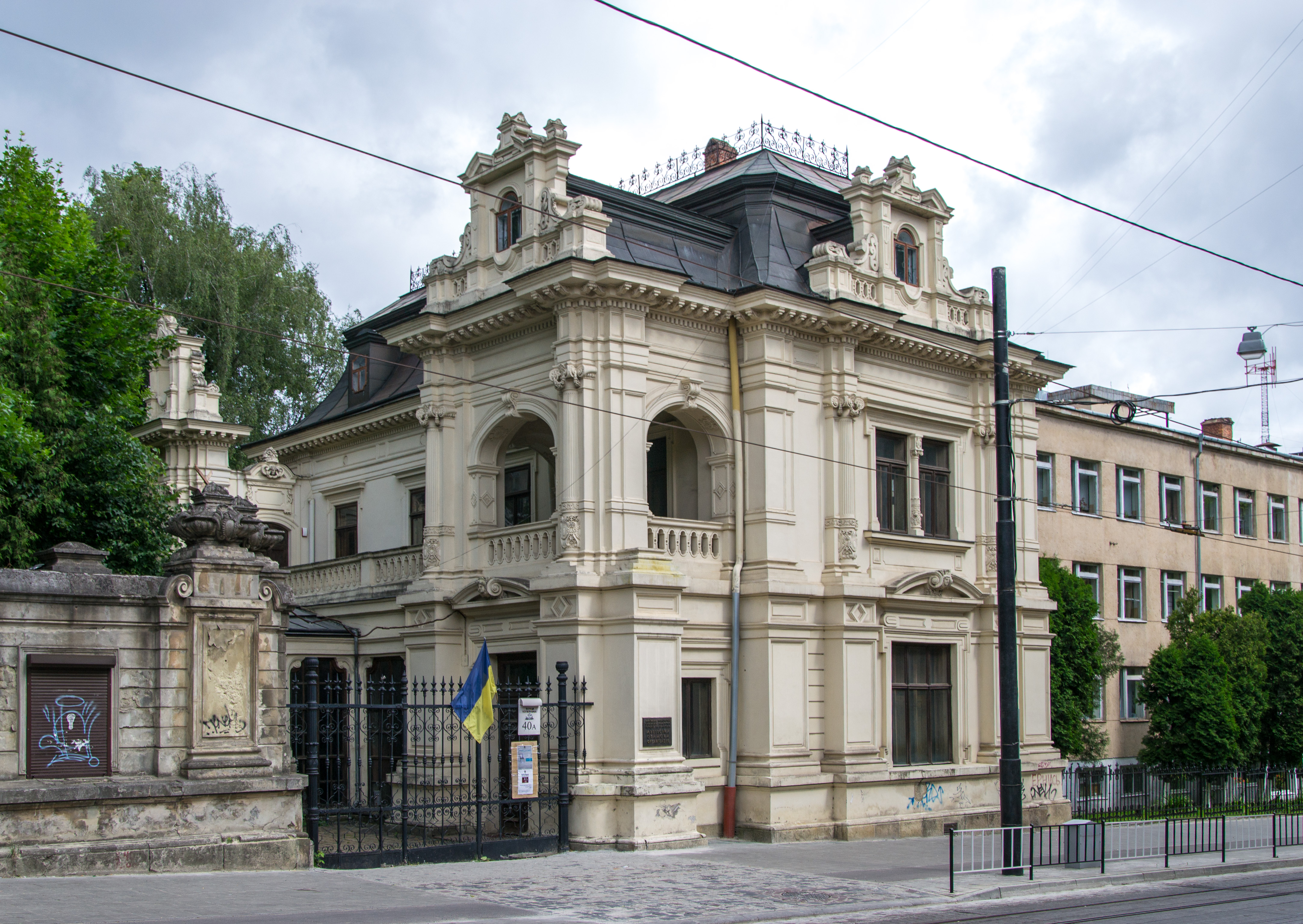
Sapieha Palace in Lviv.

The Sapieha Palace in Lviv, Ukraine is a Chateauesque two-storey mansion dating from the 1870s. It is lightly screened from the road by a wrought-iron grill. The house's first owner was Prince Adam Sapieha, a pioneer of railway building in Galicia.

In 1890, it became the official residence of Archduke Leopold Salvator of Austria and his wife Princess Blanca of Bourbon. Some of their children were born in the palace, such as Archduchesses Dolores, Immaculata and Margaretha.

After the Soviet invasion of Poland of 1939, the palace was taken over by the Soviet state and housed a school until a restoration campaign was launched in the 1990s. At present it is home to a regional society for preservation of historical and architectural monuments.

== See also ==
- Potocki Palace in Lviv
