= Karol Stanisław Radziwiłł =

Karol Stanisław Radziwiłł may refer to:

- Karol Stanisław Radziwiłł (1669–1719), Polish nobleman, Grand Chancellor of Lithuania
- Karol Stanisław Radziwiłł (1734–1790), commonly known as "Panie Kochanku", Polish prince, Voivode of Vilnius and Marshal of the Bar Confederation
