= Franciszka Urszula Radziwiłłowa =

Polish writer and playwright

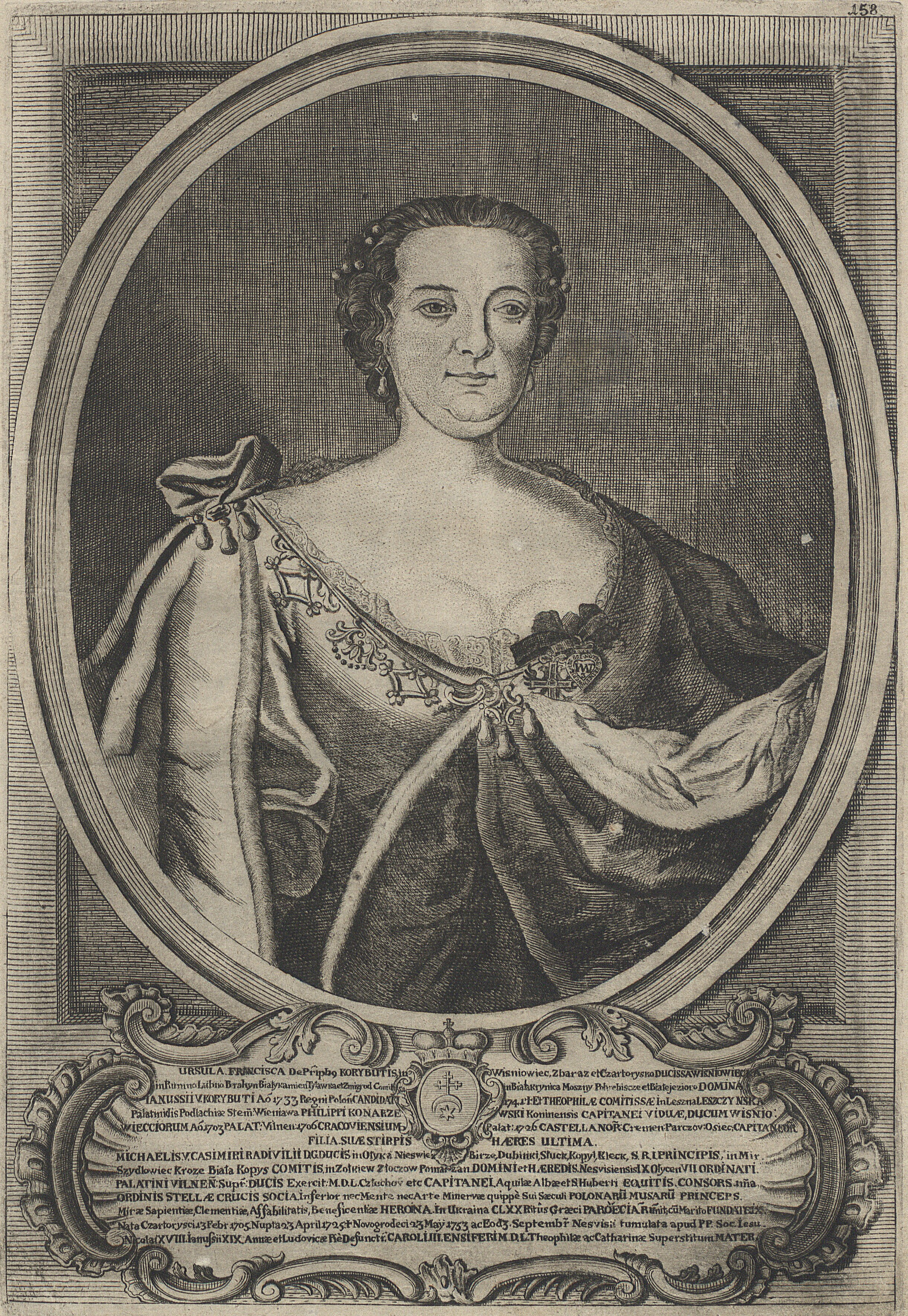
Franciszka Urszula Radziwiłł

Franciszka Urszula Radziwiłł (Lithuanian: Uršulė Pranciška Radvilaitė Višniovecka, Belarusian: Францішка Уршуля Радзівіл; February 13, 1705, Chartorysk – May 23, 1753, Navahrudak), was a Polish writer and playwright, the first female writer on the territory of modern Poland and Belarus. She was a Princess, the last female representative of the Wiśniowiecki noble house, and, until her death, the first wife of Michał Kazimierz "Rybeńko" Radziwiłł.

== Biography ==
Franciszka Urszula was the only child of famous and wealthy parents. Her father Prince Janusz Antoni Wiśniowiecki (1678–1741) was the Castellan of Kraków, governor of Vilnius and Kraków, mayor of Pinsk, while his wife Teofila (1680–1757) was a member of Leszczyński family and a daughter of the Royal epicalyx and cupbearer, governor of Podlasie, mayor of Kovel and Kamenetz.

Janusz Antoni was a public speaker and writer who wrote religious tracts, eulogies, and religious songs, and Franciszka Urszula Radziwiłł received an education at home, learning to speak several European languages, writing poetry, and reading world literature.

On April 23, 1725, Franciszka Urszula married Michał Kazimierz Radziwiłł "Rybeńko", maecenas and head of the most wealthy family in the country. He was the IX ordinate of Nesvizh (later the great Lithuanian hetman). In marriage they had four children: Karol Stanisław "Panie Kochanku" Radziwiłł (1734–1790), Janusz Tadeusz (1734–1750), Teofilia Konstancja Radziwiłłówna (1738–1818), and Katarzyna Karolina Radziwiłł (1740–1789).

Prince Michał was often away to participate in parliament, tribunals, and tours of their other lands, leaving the young Franciszka Urszula to make decisions on majority questions in management and leadership in Nesvizh. She led the restoration of the Nesvizh castle after devastating wars with Sweden, protected Nesvizh from raids of Russian army in the 1730s, streamlined and expanded the Library, and restored the printing house. Nesvizh one of the centres of cultural life in the kingdom in a very short period.

In 1740, for the first time, a foreign troupe staged a play called "The Example of Justice” in Nesvizh Castle, proving popular, and additional plays like Molière's comedy, Voltaire’s "Zaire", and works by other European authors were staged. Full life of Radziwill Theatre started after 1746, when Franciszka Urszula became its manager. That time her first dramatic works appeared. Almost every year the Princess wrote a few new plays of narrative content: in some Franciszka Urszula made accents to the need for education, in others – condemned unfaithful husbands or admired female goodness, and sincerity. However, the dominant theme of her drama was love, as evidenced by the eloquent names of the plays: "Love – a biased judge", "Love – a skilled master," "Ingenious Love" and others.

The work of Franciszka Urszula Radziwiłł can be divided into two periods. The first (1725–45) was bilingual, and genres – mainly poetic and epistolary. The most fruitful period of dramatic art and theatre activities in Nesvizh was during 1746–52, when the princess led the cultural life in the castle herself.

The last stage play in the Nesvizh Theatre, according to “The Diary" of Michał Kazimierz Radziwill, dates December 27, 1752: it was "operetta of Europe" (i.e. opera "Happy unhappiness"). Earlier in October, the princess was ill so badly that even wrote a farewell letter to her husband. She lived for another six months. The disease, which retreated in the first months of 1753, suddenly escalated on May 18 when the princess, heading to Grodno, was forced to stay in Putsevichy, a village near Navahrudak. On May 19, she was transported to Navahrudak, where she died on 23 May 1753 in the house of the mayor of Bobrujsk.

== Writing ==
=== Poetry ===
Franciszka Urszula Radziwiłł is the author of 80 poetic (undramatic) works of various volume – from four to one hundred and fifty lines. Genre system and figurative art palette of her poetry was based on the classical literary heritage of antiquity (Cicero, Ovid, Seneca), formed under the influence of Western European (primarily French classical) poetic school of the 17th century (poetry of François de Malherbe, Jean de La Bruyère) but in close connection with the artistic achievements of the national culture of the Renaissance and Baroque.

The first (recorded in the manuscripts) poetic experiences of Princess originated within epistolary. Of the large amount (more than 1300) of Franciszka Urszula’s letters the most interesting are four poetic notes to her husband. The poetic works of this genre reflected conversation concept, which was formed back in the ancient epistolary theory and gained popularity in the French salon poetry of the 18th century. According to Cicero’s regulations, the author writes letters «cotidianis verbis» («in everyday words"). Traditional epistolary formula combined with the "information of the heart."

All four poetic letters to Prince Michał imbued with a sense of sadness of separation, bear the stamp of the hot subjective feelings. Nevertheless, Franciszka Urszula wrote her epistles, clearly hoping for a wider audience, as between the lines she articulates the main points of the Code of ideal love: eternal loyalty, recognition of the highest values of love, boundless sadness and loss of interest in life in separation from loved ones.

S. Wasilewski, characterizing poetic letters of Princess Radziwiłł, seen them as “riotous bloom of feelings without literary powder and hairstyles".

A number of poetic works of Franciszka Urszula imbued with expressive didacticism. Admonition is an ideological dominant in poetic work of Princess titled "Cautions of relieve alles life information", which was written after the birth of daughter Anna Maria in 1732 and was devoted to her, and shortly after the Princess's death, in 1753, was printed by Jesuits of Nesvizh. After the opening prayer, in fifteen paragraphs the author formulates the basic tenets of chaste life. Traditional Christian concepts are interwoven here with humanistic spiritual values that are rooted in the Seneca’s "Moral letters to Lucilius". For example, tips "to glorify the Trinity of the One God", to get rid of pride, to avoid corruption and laziness, respect parents connect with the glorification of wisdom, affirmation of the priority of spiritual values over beauty. If the advice to approach the ideal of holiness (infinite mercy and goodness) are interpreted in line with the Christian-humanist doctrine, the call for restraint corresponds with the views of the Stoics and Epicureans about the serenity of the soul, not burdened by envy and greed. Organizing principle of all that is good and positive is God, so in the last paragraph the advice "to keep the commandments diligently" is connected with the desire of God's blessing for the little daughter.

Only three of the seven children of Michał and Franciszka Urszula Radziwiłł survived and reached adulthood. The loss of each child was the cause of severe mental anguish to the mother, and she wrote memorial poems. So, on the occasion of the death of two-year first-born in 1729 "The gravestones inscription... to Mikołaj Krzysztof Radziwill" was written, and the death of seventeen-years-old Janusz in 1750 gave "The regret over my son" ("Farewell to the son"). Both funeral works stood out with eloquence and were full of panegyric elements. Thus, the death of a young son Mikołaj is shown through the typical images of baroque elegiac poetry, most of which are concentrated around the motif of the "harvest of death." This choice allows to the author make a special poetic oxymoron: Mikołaj, who was born in May, and died in July, is likened to "a May flower", which is premature, still in the summer, mowed by death; or a young beast hunted in May (when hunting is permitted only in the autumn).

Lamentation of Mikołaj portrays both the grief of a mother and the significance of the loss for the Radziwiłł and Wiśniowiecki families, as well as for the kingdom. The death of young prince is represented through heraldic symbols associated with Radziwiłł’s emblem (an eagle and pipes) and Wiśniowiecki emblem (star, cross and month), as well as through the use of the emblems dominant colors, yellow and blue. The work also includes references to the history of the two noble families and incorporates elements of prayer and rhetorical expression.

The cycle of poetic portraits "Description of ladies of Her Highness Radziwill, Chancelloress of Great Lithuanian Kingdom" was written most likely in 1733, when Princess Franciszka Urszula was visiting her mother-in-law (the one mentioned in the title) Anna Katarzyna Sanguszko. This is a typical example of court poetry, created under the influence of the French salon culture of the 17th century. Poetic portraits are mainly complementary; they had a recreational function, and therefore were full of verbal sophistication, periphrasis. Active in the social life the Princess used notable facts of her surroundings in the poetry. Thus, a number of poems on a particular occasion were written. These poems are varied in content and mood: greeting poems, farewells, etc. The reason for writing could be a wedding or the feeling of friendly affection, or even the prince's hunting or sending a letter from Leon Michał Radziwiłł to his wife Anna Luiza Mycielska.

A significant part of the poetic heritage of Princess is lyric poems in which the author tries to reflect the "tyranny of the soul." Nesvizh poet expresses her personal understanding of the nature of relationships between women and men ("I often do not understand those people..." "Phony fun of variable affects..."), from the height of her life experience analyses her era ("those who cannot read the personalities"), formulates her own strategy of inner life ("Complaint", "Verse with a murmur of marriage "). Self-presentation mostly covers the sphere of her intimate feelings.

Lyrical poetry sometimes comes in the form of religious poetry. However, the poems addressed to the God become poetic illustrations of various states of a Christian soul, which coincide with the three parts of the rosary (joyful, mourning and praise). This is the confession of faith and humble prayer ("God, you're the paradise defender ...") or mournful memories about the torments of Christ (freestyle interpretation of anthem «Stabat Mater» – «Your wounds bleed, Jesus"), or doxology affection with miracle of God's creation ("The call for creatures to praise their Creator"). Sometimes biblical topic can be an artistic background for the unfolding of moral concept of the author (the poem "Sweet memories on Paradise "). This lyrical poetry of Princess Radziwill is the most consistent in the development of baroque aesthetics and style.

Art techniques help the author to disclose her philosophy of life, first – the inner life. According educated aristocrat, her personal spiritual experience is worth to make it public; like other poets of the Baroque period, she felt to be the happy owner of the truth. This feeling led to the awareness of intellectual elitism.

An important fact is the "sloppy" attitude of to copyright. On one hand, Princess Franciszka Urszula considers it possible to personally rewrite a poem by French poet François de Malherbe and "forget" mark in the manuscript the author's name, on the other hand – she assigns her poems authorship to other persons (such as, "Gratitude of His Highness Prince Leon Radziwill" or "Verse on the memory of Her Highness Anna Luiza Mycielska... ").

=== Prose ===
Authorship of Princess remains unproven towards prose treatises in French, placed in the collection "Manuscript full of different poems I have collected and by the order of His Highness husband of mine of my own hand copied [...] in Nesvizh on March 29, 1732". In the works "On the mutual responsibilities of men and women...", "Relationship with others and secrecy of it" a variety of family life issues is analysed, as well as a logical reasoning to ensure happiness in marriage given: a wise prudence, piety of spouses, reciprocal enforcement of marital obligations, propriety and benevolence, politeness and virtuousness.

In her treatise "On Marriage" a spiritual (religious), and the social nature of the union of man and woman is revealed, goals of marriage are formulated, as well as advice is given on how to make the right choice and make the marriage a happy one. It is obvious that the issues reflected in francophone treatises were extremely interesting for the poet, whose work from the beginning thematically and figuratively had been clearly directed to the theme of love, at least in the marriage.

=== Drama ===
Since 1746 Franciszka Urszula Radziwiłł wrote two or three plays a year and put them on the stage in Nesvizh and Alba. After marriage, the princess rarely travelled outside the Radziwill residences. Frequent childbirth, poor health did not allow her to travel, so her "theater education" was carried out at home, in the library. From the poetic-dramatic specimens she moved to comedy, tragedy and the libretto.

A special feature of the Radziwill’s dramatic art is that she wrote directly for the stage: as soon as any tragedy or comedy has been prepared, any family celebration could be a convenient pretext for staging it. At the same time, there was not any internal connection between the respective views of celebration and genre of a play: a serious thing was performed when something serious was written, funny – when a comedy was in the presence.

There is reason to doubt that Franciszka Urszula Radziwiłł began writing drama only in the 1740s: the fragments of individual pieces were probably written before. Perhaps some of the draft could occur before 1732, when Princess actively mused upon the problems of love and marriage. However, because the evidence of the early dramatic experience doesn’t exist, the starting point of her dramaturgical and directorial activity is officially considered June 13, 1746, when in Nesvizh, in the summer residence Alba the comedy "Ingenious Love", dedicated to 44th anniversary of Prince Michał Kazimierz was staged. Due to the lack of facilities adapted for performances, the play was performed in the open air: arch decoration was built, sofas put for the nobles and clergy audience (petty nobles and officers of the Nesvizh garrison watched the play standing).

After the first play, encouraged with husband’s praise, Franciszka Urszula Radziwiłł started constant work on the repertoire for Nesvizh theater, and with the intensity of her work, dramatic skills of Francesca grew from year to year. In 1746, after the first comedy, the princess wrote another play called "It’s God's predetermination". This product, labelled by the author as "a tragedy", opens a number of plays, which in fact were a dramatic interpretation of fairy tales. Thus, the basis of the above-mentioned tragedy – well known in European folklore tale about Sleeping Beauty and Snow White. Because princesses Theophila and Karolina Radziwill were actors of this play, we can assume that it were children who prompted their mother to use famous fairy tales.

A comparison of the plot of the play "It's God's predetermination" with different interpretations of the original story in the folklore shows the Belarusian or Ukrainian roots of the story. Meanwhile, the naive tale of Franciszka Urszula Radziwiłł is filled with moralizing pathos. The play becomes an illustration of one of the central motifs of Francesca’s plays: everything that happens in the world – the matter of God's predetermination. The main role in the play belongs not to the talking mirror, but to the cruel godless mother who loses her beauty when becomes a moral monster.

The comedy "Love is a biased judge" recreates the story of the Trojan prince Paris from his birth to his arrival in Troy with the Helen. Greek myths about the Trojan War, since ancient times were very popular. However, despite the large number of predecessors who wrote about the Trojan myth, Princess Radziwiłł went her own way in creating a comedy. The writer changes events, the story builds, and the names of the characters. In her play, she showed a new, 'aristocratic' understanding of the essence of the Trojan myth, new accents. She entirely exonerates Paris and Priam, while all previous literary-dramatic tradition considered them as negative characters departed from the will of the gods.

Main character receives a fundamentally new interpretation: in the famous scene with the "Three Graces" Paris gives "the apple of discord" to Venus without hesitation (in contrast to the mythical hero). He believes that would have to be afraid of condemnation of the gods, if he gave the apple to acquire power or wisdom, but not for love. Travel of Paris to Greece also gets a new interpretation. According to the myth, the Trojan prince is going for the liberation of Priam’s sister Hesiona but with the hope to get Helena in Sparta. Radziwill’s Paris completely forgets about the gift of Venus: ashamed of his ignorance, he goes on a long journey to civilized countries to get an education. This plot has primarily a didactic purpose of teaching children, and in a broader sense reinterpretation of the myth can be seen as the result of the Enlightenment ideology, with its cult of science and education. "The hare-brained judge" is the story of three Christian sisters-martyrs Agapa, Hiony and Irene who lived in times of Emperor Dioсletian. The drama is close to the genre of medieval morality play but creatively reworked so main characters were thus in the spotlight.

G. Baryshev pointed out "emphasis on the greatness and power of the spirit, that could not been broken with persuasion to change the religion or the torture and humiliation".

Describing the main characters, the author draws attention to the "internal", the spiritual aspect of their holiness. To this, we can add the talent of Princess Radziwill as the poetic interpreter of the Christian religion.

Comedy "Love is born in the eyes" opens the cycle of plays that Polish researcher Yuri Kzhyzhanovsky calls antic-eastern-pastoral. The comedy takes place in Cyprus in ancient times. The author’s focus is power of love over the person. In one of the episodes, Princess Radziwill acts as an amateur politician, offering a model of the ideal state.

In 1750, Franciszka Urszula writes a tragedy, "Gold in the fire." The plot of the play is known from the Boccaccio’s novels: a story of the Marquis of Saluzzo, who married a poor girl, and then brutally checked a new wife on loyalty and obedience to his will. One more comedy, "The Amusement of Fortune" is happening in Egypt and based on the legend about the king of Egypt Apries, who was overthrown by new proclaimed king Amadis. The legend was taken from Herodotus "History". Franciszka Urszula Radziwiłł succeeded in synthesizing ancient history, figurative and narrative features of the Hellenistic and heroic novels, adding magnificent Baroque vocal and decoration. For 1751 play "Trapped libertines”, Francesca processed famous Eastern fairy tale from “Thousand and one nights”. Danish expert A. Stender-Peterson noted liveliness of dialogues and wonderful characteristic differentiation. [3] It was an achievement of Francesca that in the era of pastoral drama she used live colloquial, created vivid real characters and successfully combined all the elements.

The comedy "Unreasonable Judge" was the second Eastern farce, "realistic samples of comic Orientalism" [4] Nesvizh poet united the eastern entourage with elements of farcical action.

The year 1752 was the last and most productive in the work of the Princess: she translated two Molière plays – "Les Précieuses ridicules" and "Doctor in spite of himself". She made her own dramatic adaptations and put them on stage in Nesvizh. In the same year, she made two operas based on classical antic mythology. The ancient myth embodies the dominant idea of Franciszka Urszula’s work: a sincere love – tests, but at the same time a reward for them. Unlike in ancient stories, Franciszka Urszula’s love is a gallant refined feeling; the desire for spiritual unity and not physical thirst. [5]

Franciszka Urszula Radziwiłł was the creator of Nesvizh Court Theatre repertoire, translator and processor of Molière's comedy heritage. She was the first Belarusian woman-playwright and created syncretic dramatic culture, developed under the significant influence of the Western European theater. Her style was created under the Baroque influence with its features: blurred genre boundaries, free composition, etc. At the same time, certain episodes confirm the impact of classic poetics, as well as the Enlightenment ideology. [6] Transferring scene to exotic countries, the author used domestic, social and political realities of her own country.

The writer's credo can be outlined as "a praise of a woman" Her dramatic work absorb the ideas and concepts of modern times – the Enlightenment, reflects spiritual needs of aristocracy; it is an evidence of the high level of the refined poetic word in Polish-Belarusian literature of the 18th century. [7].

== Heritage ==
After her death, one of the Nesvizh actors and stage directors Jakub Fryczyński published all her dramatic works, with engraved illustrations by Michał Żukowski based on drawings of Franciszka Urszula Radziwiłł ("Komedye y Tragedye", 1754). [8] Volumetric tome titled "Comedy and tragedy, composed by... Her Highness Princess Wiśniowiecki, Korybut, Radziwiłł" includes nine comedies, five tragedies and two operas (according to genre definitions, written in the book). There are several copies of the book printed without a date, on good paper, with differences both in the title page and in the text. A copy from the National Library of Belarus is likely to be a re-publication.

The legacy of Princess Franciszka Urszula Radziwiłł is a valuable historical and literary document. It consists of sixteen comedies and tragedies. The writer even tried her skills in opera librettos. Her plays staging carried out at various Radziwiłł estates, but after Michał Kazimierz's death in 1762, his wife’s work became theatrical relic and aroused the interest of only a narrow circle in Radziwiłł family. Then public forgot it. New rise of Nesvizh theater started in 1777, when Franciszka Urszula Radziwiłł’s son Karol Stanislaw Radziwill "Pan Kochanku" returned from exile.

For a long time the name of Franciszka Urszula Radziwiłł was unknown to the general reader. In Belarus, a book of selected plays was published only in 2003. Natalia Rusetskaya, Natalia Gordienko, Andrey Hadanovich, Zhanna Nekrashevich-Korotkaya, etc. made the translation into Belarusian language.

== Footnotes ==
3. ↑ Stender-Petersen A. Die Dramen, insbesondere die Komödien, der Fürszin Radziwiłł // Zeitschrift für slawische Philologie. 1960. T. XXVIII. H 2. S. 381-281.

4. ↑ Kryżanowski J. talia i melpomena w Nieświeżu: Twórczość U. F. Radziwiłłowej // Pamiętnik teatralny. 1961. R. X. Z. 3 (39). S. 397.

5. ↑ Zh. Nekrashevіch-Karotkaya. Frantsishka Urshulia Radzіwіll... P. 872.

6. ↑ Zh. Nekrashevіch-Karotkaya. Frantsishka Urshulia Radzіwіll... p. 874.

7. ↑ Zh. Nekrashevіch-Karotkaya. Frantsishka Urshulia Radzіwіll... p. 875.

8. ↑ Widacka, Hanna. Księżna sawantka (Pol.). Muzeum Pałac w Wilanowie. Retrieved on March 15, 2012.

== Bibliography ==
- F.U. Radzіwіll. Selected work: Minsk, "Bel. knіgazbor ", 2003. – 445, [8].
- F.U. Radzіwіll. Deliverance Precautions: [Poetry]. Reckless Judge: [Play] / Frantsishka Urshulia Radzіwill // Nasha vera. 2003. № 2 pp 52–60.
