= Rue Radziwill =

Street in Paris, France

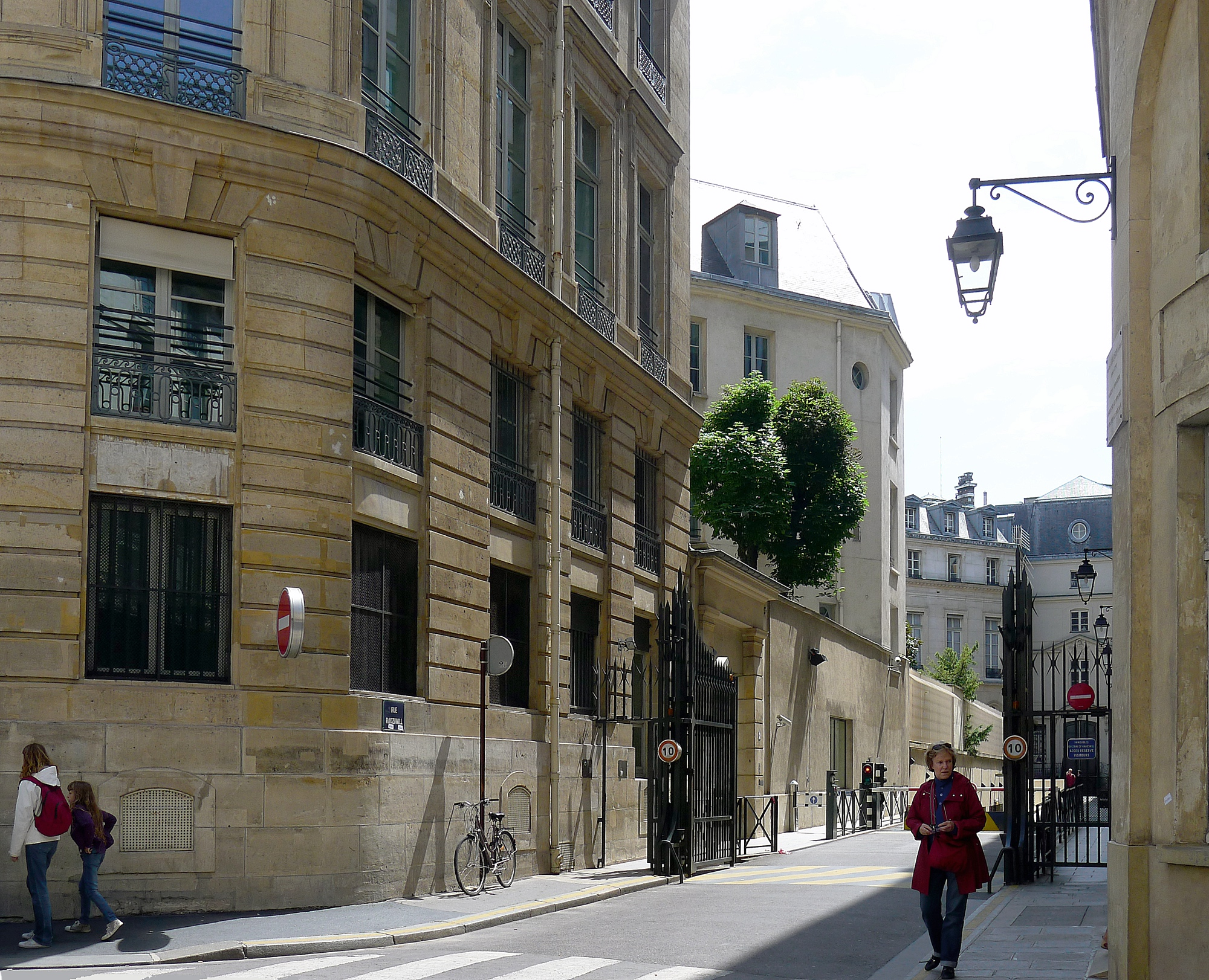

- Location within Paris
- Length: 94 m (308 ft)
- Width: 7.6 m (25 ft)
- Arrondissement: 1st
- Quarter: Palais-Royal
- Coordinates: 48.865735°N 2.339454°E
- From: Rue des Petits-Champs
- To: Dead end

Construction
- Completion: 1640
- Denomination: 26 February 1867

The Rue Radziwill is a street in the 1st arrondissement of Paris. It starts at 1 rue des Petits-Champs and ends in a dead end. It was named after Lithuanian nobleman and politician Karol Stanisław Radziwiłł.

== History ==
The street was originally called the Rue Neuve des Bons Enfants. It was created in 1640 on land that Cardinal Richelieu had purchased in 1634. It ended on the Rue Baillif, which has since been removed.

The musician François Couperin moved to the Rue Neuve des Bons Enfants in 1724, where he stayed the rest of his life. The area was popular with musicians, particularly those who worked at the nearby Académie Royale de Musique.

The passage Radziwill, which crossed a house owned by the Lithuanian nobleman Karol Stanisław Radziwiłł (1734-1790), ended on the street. It no longer exists.

The street was given its present name on 26 February 1867. The Banque de France expropriated several buildings on the street in the 1880s. It was downgraded by a decree of 23 November 1912 to allow for expansions to the Bank of France.

== Buildings ==
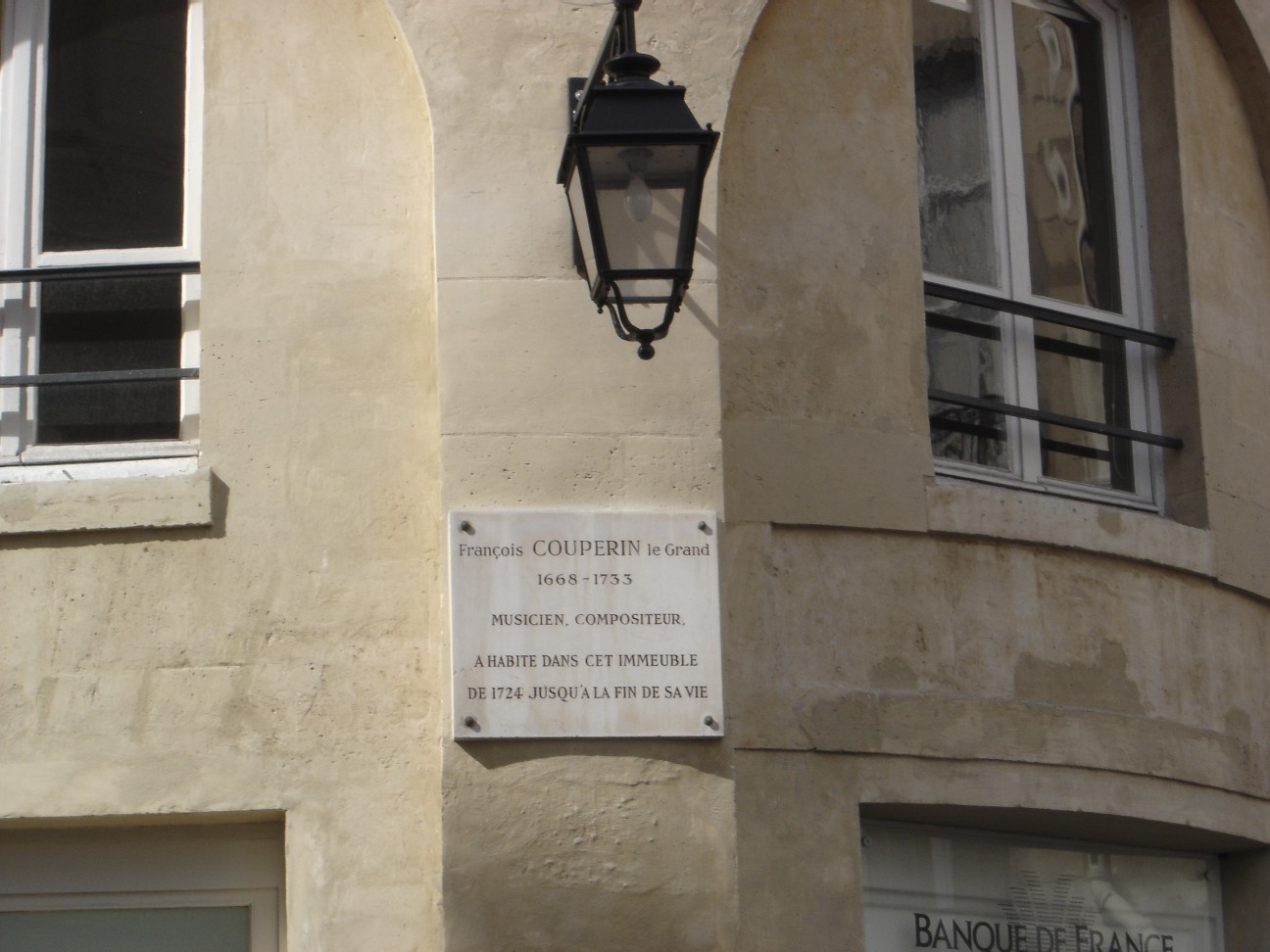
Plaque marking the house of the musician François Couperin (1668-1733), who lived on the Rue Radziwill from 1724 until the end of his life.

No. 22 is the entrance to the headquarters of the Banque de France. The original building was built by Jules Hardouin Mansart for Louis Phélypeaux, marquis de La Vrillière, and was occupied in 1713 by the son of Louis XIV and Madame de Montespan. The bank was set up in the house on Napoleon's initiative. Of the original building only the Galerie Dorée (Golden Gallery) remains.

No. 33 was an old hotel from the 1780s called the Hôtel de Hollande or de Radziwill. It had another entrance at 48 rue de Valois. In 1791 the hotel contained a dangerous gambling hall. It had seven rooms on the Rue de Valois side, eight on the other side and four on the mezzanine. The building had a double staircase. This was useful when it contained a brothel, so the customers would not meet each other.
