= Karol Stanisław Radziwiłł (1734–1790) =

Polish nobleman (1734–1790)

His Grace Prince Karol Stanisław Radziwiłł "Panie Kochanku"
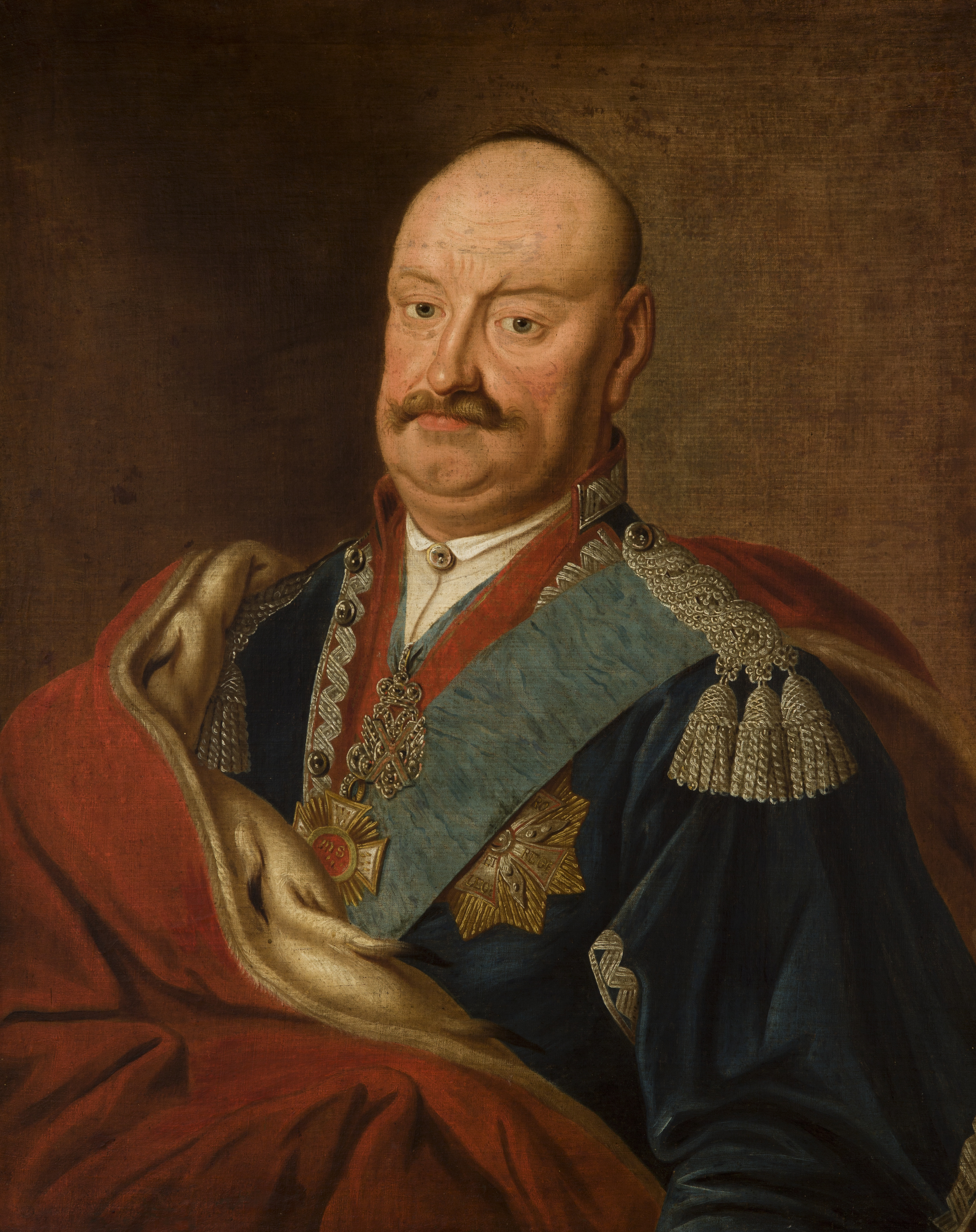
- Portrait by Konstanty Aleksandrowicz, 1786

Sejm Marshal Sejm Marshal of the Kingdom of Poland and the Grand Duchy of Lithuania
- In office 5 October 1767 – 5 March 1768
- Monarch: Stanisław II Augustus
- Preceded by: Celestyn Czaplic
- Succeeded by: Michał Hieronim Radziwiłł

Personal details
- Born: 27 February 1734 Nieśwież, Polish–Lithuanian Commonwealth
- Died: 21 November 1790 (aged 56) Biała Podlaska, Polish–Lithuanian Commonwealth
- Spouse(s): Maria Karolina Lubomirska (pl); Teresa Karolina Rzewuska
- Parents: Michał Kazimierz "Rybeńko" Radziwiłł (father); Urszula Franciszka Wiśniowiecka (mother)
- Known for: Bar Confederation; Radom Confederation

Prince Karol Stanisław Radziwiłł (Lithuanian: Karolis Stanislovas Radvila II, Exonym: Charles Stanislaus: 27 February 1734 – 21 November 1790) was a Polish–Lithuanian nobleman, diplomat and prince of the Commonwealth. He is frequently referred to by his well-known sobriquet Panie Kochanku ("My Beloved Sir") (Note: The sobriquet "Panie Kochanku" ("My Beloved Sir") comes from his favorite form of informal addressing to others) to distinguish him from his earlier namesake. Prince Radziwiłł held several important posts; from 1752 he was the Master Swordbearer of Lithuania, and in 1757 he became one of the first recipients of the Order of the White Eagle. From 1762 he was Voivode of Vilnius.

Radziwiłł was born on 27 February 1734 to General-Hetman Michał Kazimierz "Rybeńko" Radziwiłł and Princess Urszula Franciszka Wiśniowiecka and spent his childhood in Nieśwież, in the Grand Duchy of Lithuania, then part of the Polish–Lithuanian Commonwealth.

In 1767 he became Marshal General of the Radom Confederation and, the following year, Marshal of the Bar Confederation. After its fall in 1772 he emigrated, but in 1777 returned to the Polish–Lithuanian Commonwealth and resumed all his previous posts after having first pledged his loyalty to Polish King Stanisław II Augustus, whom he had previously opposed. During the Great Sejm from 1788 until his death in 1790 he was a leading opponent of reform, King Stanisław Augustus and his allies; the members of the so-called Familia political party headed by the Czartoryski family.

Radziwiłł was the wealthiest magnate in Poland–Lithuania, in the second half of the 18th century. However, he was popular among the poorer nobility. Suffering from obesity and the after-effects of alcoholism, in the spring of 1790 Karol Stanisław Radziwiłł moved to the town of Biała Podlaska in the Crown of the Kingdom of Poland, where he died on November 21 leaving no issue to inherit his enormous wealth.

Julian Ursyn Niemcewicz stated that Radziwiłł was a "citizen with a heart of stone whose sacrifices for the Polish nation were remarkable and unforgettable". Radziwiłł was also immortalized in Rejtan, the Fall of Poland, an oil painting by the Polish artist Jan Matejko, finished in 1866, depicting the protest of Tadeusz Rejtan against the First Partition of Poland during the Partition Sejm of 1773. Both a depiction of a historical moment, and an allegory for the surrounding period of Polish history, the painting is one of Matejko's most famous works, and an iconic picture of an emotional protest.

Pantler Horeszko, from the epic poem Pan Tadeusz by Adam Mickiewicz, was loosely based on Karol Stanisław Radziwiłł.

The prince owned a house on the Rue Neuve des Bons Enfants in Paris. The street is now called Rue Radziwill.

== See also ==
- List of szlachta
- Radziwiłł family
- Polish-Lithuanian Commonwealth
