= Michał Kazimierz "Rybeńko" Radziwiłł =

Polish–Lithuanian noble (1702–1762)

Michał Kazimierz "Rybeńko" Radziwiłł Grand Hetman of Lithuania
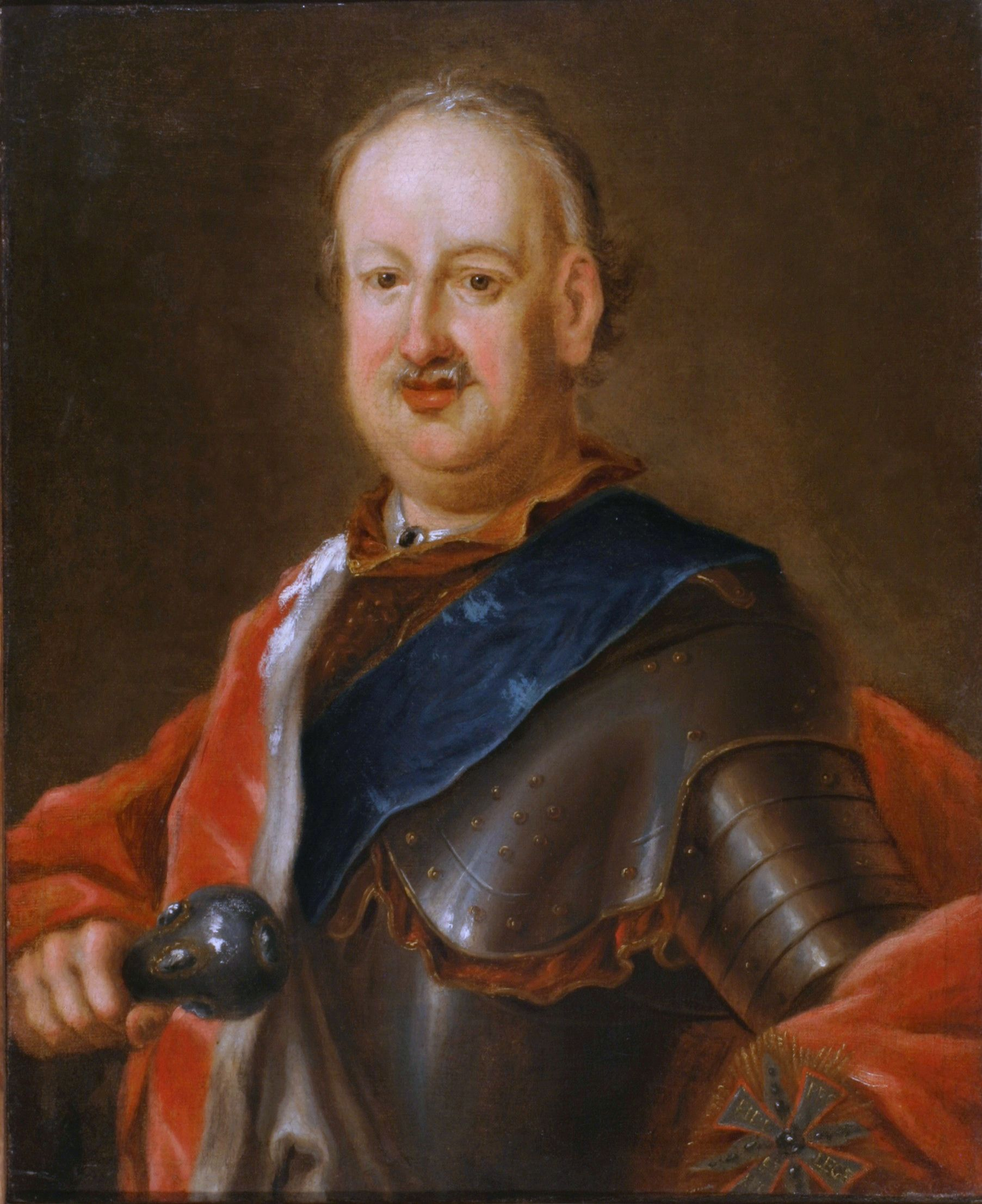
- Born: 13 June 1702; Olyka
- Died: 15 May 1762 (aged 59); Nieśwież
- Spouse(s): Urszula Franciszka Wiśniowiecka; Anna Luiza Mycielska
- Children: with Urszula Franciszka Wiśniowiecka: Michal Krzysztof Radziwiłł; Janusz Tadeusz Radziwiłł; Karol Stanisław Radziwiłł; Anna Radziwiłł; Ludwika Radziwiłł; Teofilia Konstancja Radziwiłł; Katarzyna Karolina Radziwiłł with Anna Luiza Mycielska: Weronika Joanna Radziwiłł; Hieronim Wincenty Radziwiłł; Maria Wiktoria Radziwiłł; Józefina Radziwilłł; Konstancja Radziwiłł
- Parent(s): Karol Stanisław Radziwłł; Anna Katarzyna Sanguszko

Prince Michał Kazimierz Radziwiłł (Lithuanian: Mykolas Kazimieras Radvila, Belarusian: Міхал Казімер Радзівіл; 13 June 1702 – 15 May 1762) was a Polish–Lithuanian noble. A member of the aristocratic Radziwiłł family, he was frequently referred to by his sobriquet (known from his idiolect phrase) Rybeńko (Žuvelė, Рыбанька), to distinguish him from the other Michał Kazimierz Radziwiłł. Ordynat of Niasviž and Olyka, owner of Biržai, Dubingiai, Slutsk, Kopyła and Shumsk.

He was a Master of the Horse of Lithuania since 1728, Court Marshal of Lithuania since 1734, Field Lithuanian Hetman and castellan of Trakai since 1737, castellan of Vilnius since 1742, voivode of Vilnius and Grand Lithuanian Hetman since 1744. Like his father, he was the starost of a number of towns, including Przemyśl, Bratslav, Kamianets-Podilskyi, Człuchów, Krzeczów, Ovruch, Nowy Targ, Parczew, Osiek and Kaunas.

On 23 April 1725 in Bilokrynytsia (pol. Biala Krynica) he married Urszula Franciszka Wiśniowiecka. Later married Anna Luiza Mycielska on 2 January 1754 in Lviv. Awarded with the Order of the White Eagle in August 1727.

The treatment of his medical problems included 56 bleedings, 30 applications of leeches, and 13 cuppings. These treatments have been described as illustrative demonstrations of medical interventions available to the wealthy at the time.

His former lover was Maria Karolina Sobieska, granddaughter of John III Sobieski.
