= Nieśwież uprising =

Niasviž (Nieśwież) uprising
- Part of the Polish–Soviet War
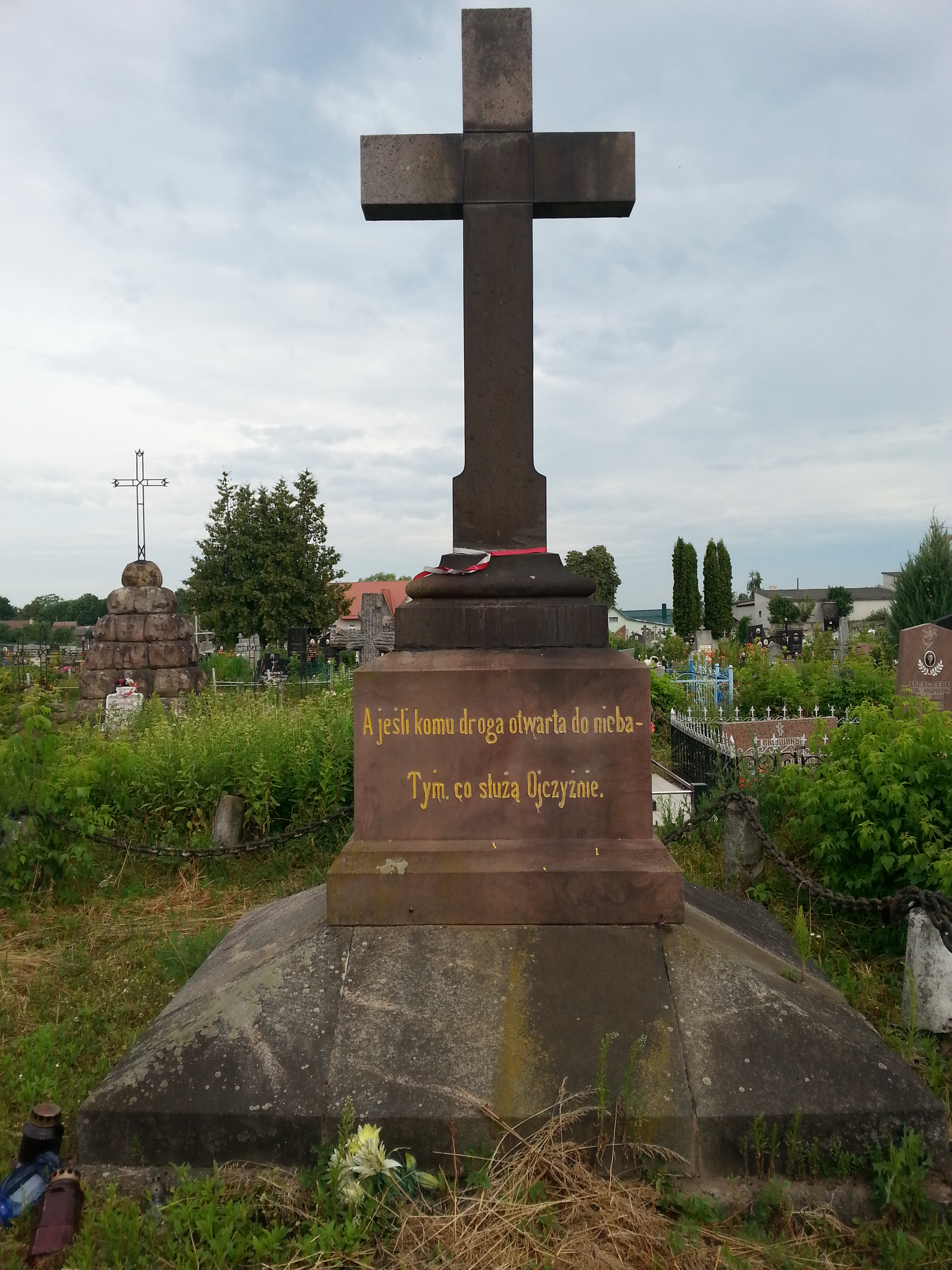
- Grave of murdered insurgents at the Catholic cemetery in Nesvizh
Date	14th – 19th March 1919
Location	Nieśwież (present-day Nesvizh, Belarus)
Result	Soviet victory: Executions of the organizers

Belligerents
(Second Polish Republic) Polish inhabitants	(Russian Soviet Federative Socialist Republic) Soviet Russia

Commanders and leaders
Mieczysław Wolnisty; Polikarp Kolenda; Józef Januszkiewicz; Konstanty Szydłowski; Stanisław Iwanowski	Unknown

Casualties and losses
At least 5 leaders of the uprising killed	At least 3 Bolshevik activists killed

The Niasviž uprising, or Nieśwież uprising (Polish: Powstanie nieświeskie, Belarusian: Нясвіжскае паўстанне) was a failed anti-Soviet pro-Polish insurrection residents of the town of Niasviž (Polish: Nieśwież, now Belarus. It took place on March 14–19, 1919, during the Polish-Soviet War. As a result, the victorious Bolsheviks shot five leaders of the uprising. The Niasviž Uprising was later commemorated by two monuments, one of which still exists.

== Background ==
In early 1919, Niasviž was captured without fight by the Bolsheviks, who advanced westwards, behind German troops of the Ober Ost. In February 1919, the Polish-Soviet War began, and Polish forces moved eastwards, clashing with the Red Army. The residents of Niasviž, who anticipated the arrival of Polish troops any day, decided to start an anti-Bolshevik rebellion, headed by principal of the local grammar school, Mieczysław Wolnisty.

In the night of March 14/15, 1919, the rebels seized key buildings in the town, and liquidated local council. Some Communist leaders were killed, including commissars Rozenblum and Grynblat. Other Bolsheviks abandoned the town and headed towards Minsk, requesting help along the way.

On March 19, the Red Army re-entered Niasviž without fighting, as rebel forces were too weak, and Polish Army troops still were too far away. Soon afterwards, the Cheka arrested five Polish leaders: Mieczysław Wolnisty, Polikarp Kolenda, Józef Januszkiewicz, Konstanty Szydłowski and Stanisław Iwanowski. All were taken to the complex of former Bernardine monastery, which was used by the Soviets as a prison. On March 24, they were shot in a forest near Niasviž.

== Aftermath ==
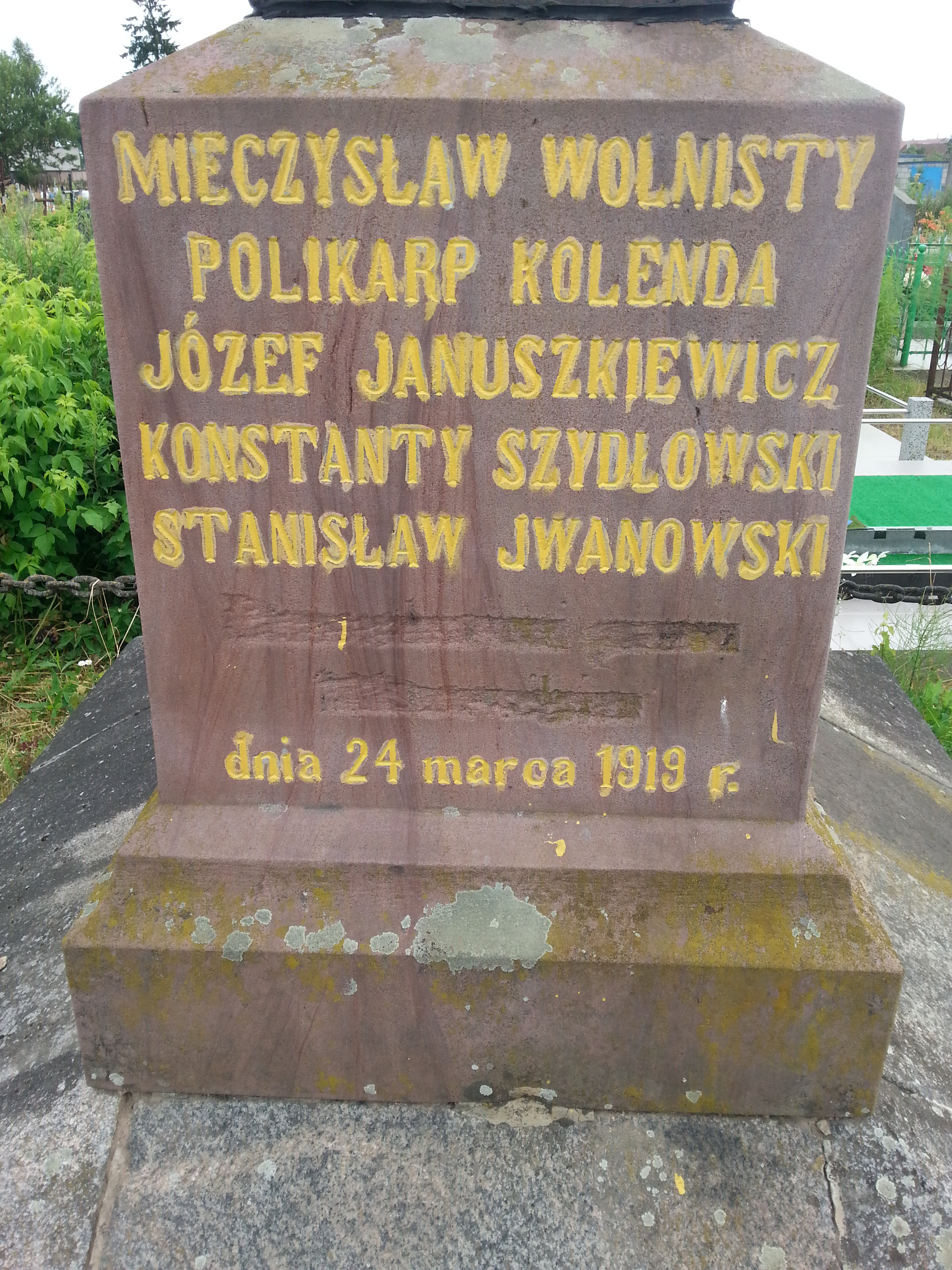
Fragment of the tombstone with pre-war inscription removed

Following the Polish-Soviet War, Nieswiez became part of the Second Polish Republic, and two monuments, commemorating the rebellion, were built. One was located in the center of the town, and was destroyed during World War II. The other one was erected on March 24, 1926 at a local Roman Catholic cemetery, on the tomb of the five shot Polish leaders. The monument, which was founded by students and teachers of the local school, still exists. After 1944, the inscription pomordowani przez bolszewików ("murdered by the Bolsheviks") was removed by the Soviets from the tombstone. After 1990, it was renovated.

== Sources ==
- Pod red. Anny Kaminski: Miescy pamiaci achwiarau kamunizmu u Biełarusi. Lipsk: Fundacja Badań nad Dyktaturą SED, 2011, s. 278

== See also ==
- Bibliography of the Russian Revolution and Civil War
- Outline of the Russian Revolution and Civil War
- Index of articles related to the Russian Revolution and Civil War
- The "Russian" Civil Wars, 1916–1926: Ten Years That Shook the World
- Russia in Flames: War, Revolution, Civil War, 1914–1921
- Russia in Revolution: An Empire in Crisis, 1890 to 1928
- Russia: Revolution and Civil War, 1917—1921
- The Russian Revolution: A New History
- Polish–Soviet War
