= Hieronim Florian Radziwiłł =

Polish–Lithuanian noble (1715–1760)

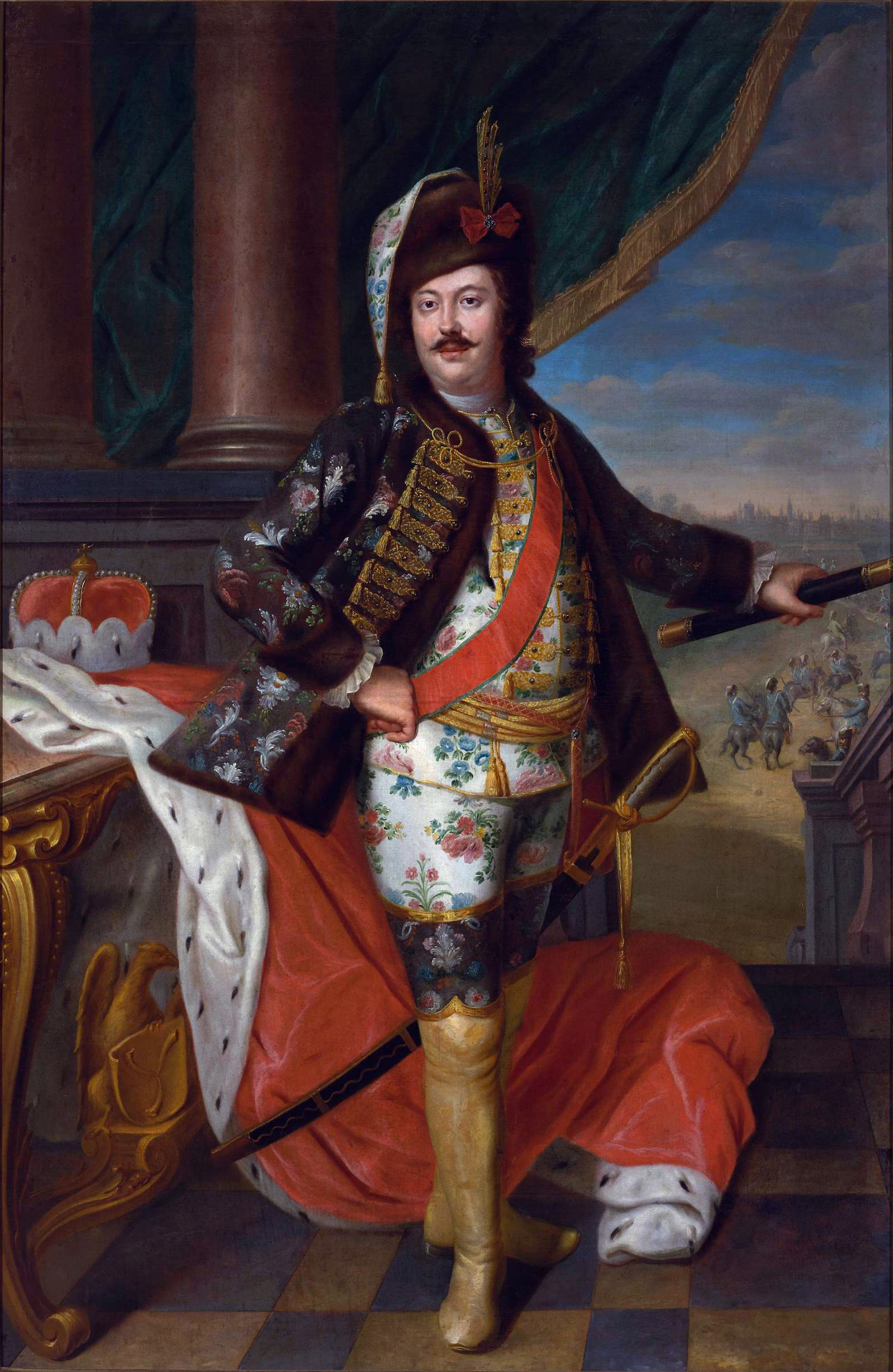
- Born: 4 May 1715; Biała Podlaska
- Died: 17 May 1760 (aged 45); Biała Podlaska
- Spouse(s): Teresa Sapieha; Magdalena Czapska; Aniela Miączyńska
- Parent(s): Karol Stanisław Radziwłł; Anna Katarzyna Sanguszko

Prince Hieronim Florian Radziwiłł Polish: [xʲɛrɔɲim flɔrʲan rad͡ʑiviwː] (Lithuanian: Jeronimas Florianas Radvila) (1715–1760) was a Polish–Lithuanian szlachcic.

He was Deputy cup-bearer of Lithuania since 1739, Great Chorąży of Lithuania since 1750 and starost of Przemyśl and Krzyczew.

He married Teresa Sapieha on 9 September 1740, Magdalena Czapska in October 1745 in Warsaw and Aniela Miączyńska on 1 January 1755.
