= Mikołaj Krzysztof Radziwiłł (1695–1715) =

Lithuanian-Polish nobleman

- Coat of arms
- Born: 14 August 1695; Biała Podlaska
- Died: 2 June 1715 (aged 19)
- Parents: Karol Stanisław Radziwłł; Anna Katarzyna Sanguszko
- Occupation: nobleman Podstoli of Lithuania and starost of Człuchów

Prince Mikołaj Krzysztof Radziwiłł (Lithuanian: Mykalojus Kristupas Radvila; 14 August 1695 in Biała Podlaska – 2 June 1715) was a Lithuanian–Polish nobleman.

Mikołaj became Podstoli of Lithuania and starost of Człuchów.

== Noble family ==
He was the son of Karol Stanisław Radziwiłł and Anna Katarzyna Sanguszko.
