= Nyasvizh =

Town in Minsk Region, Belarus

Nyasvizh Нясвіж (Belarusian) Несвиж (Russian)
- Town
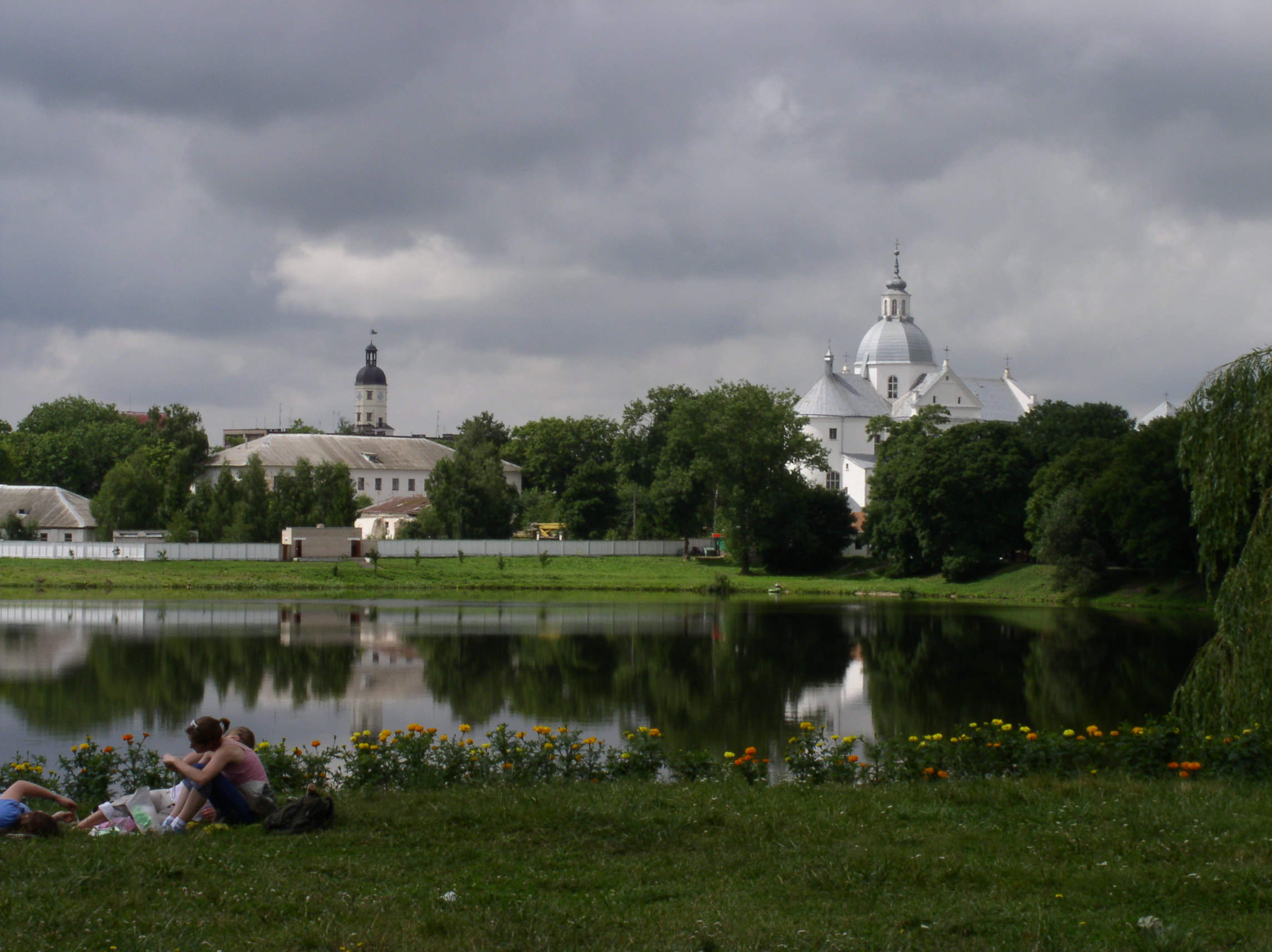

- Flag Coat of arms

- Location within Belarus
- Coordinates: 53°13′N 26°40′E
- Country: Belarus
- Region: Minsk Region
- District: Nyasvizh District
- First mentioned: 1223
- Town rights since: 1586

Population (2026)
  - Total: 15,897
- Time zone: UTC+3 (MSK)
- Postal code: 222603, 222620
- Area code: +375 1770
- Website: www.nesvizh.minsk-region.by

UNESCO World Heritage Site
- Official name: Complex of the Radziwiłł Family at Nesvizh
- Type: Cultural, architectural
- Criteria: ii, iv, vi
- Designated: 2005 (29th session)
- Reference no.: 1196
- UNESCO region: Europe

Nyasvizh or Nesvizh (Note: Belarusian: Нясвіж, romanized: Niasviž, IPA: [nʲaˈsʲvʲiʐ]; Russian: Несвиж; Lithuanian: Nesvyžius; Polish: Nieśwież; Yiddish: ניעסוויז; Latin: Nesvisium) is a town that is the administrative centre of Nyasvizh District in Minsk Region, Belarus. It is the site of Nesvizh Castle, a World Heritage Site. In 2009, its population was 14,300. As of 2026, it has a population of 15,987.

== History ==
Timeline of Nyasvizh
Historical affiliations

Grand Duchy of Lithuania 13th c.–1569
Polish–Lithuanian Commonwealth 1569–1793
Russian Empire 1793–1812
Lithuanian Provisional Governing Commission 1812
Russian Empire 1812–1917
Bolsheviks 1917–1918
German Empire, 1918–1919
SSR Byelorussia, 1919
LitBel, 1919
Poland, 1919–1939
USSR (BSSR), 1939–1941
Nazi Germany (occupation), 1941–1944
(Soviet Union) USSR (BSSR), 1944–1991
Belarus, 1991–present

Nesvizh was first documented in 1223. It was part of the Grand Duchy of Lithuania until 1793, but the Grand Duchy was part of the Polish–Lithuanian Commonwealth since 1569. In the 15th century, while still a minor town, it belonged to the Kiszka family and later to the Radziwiłł family, and remained the family's seat until 1813.

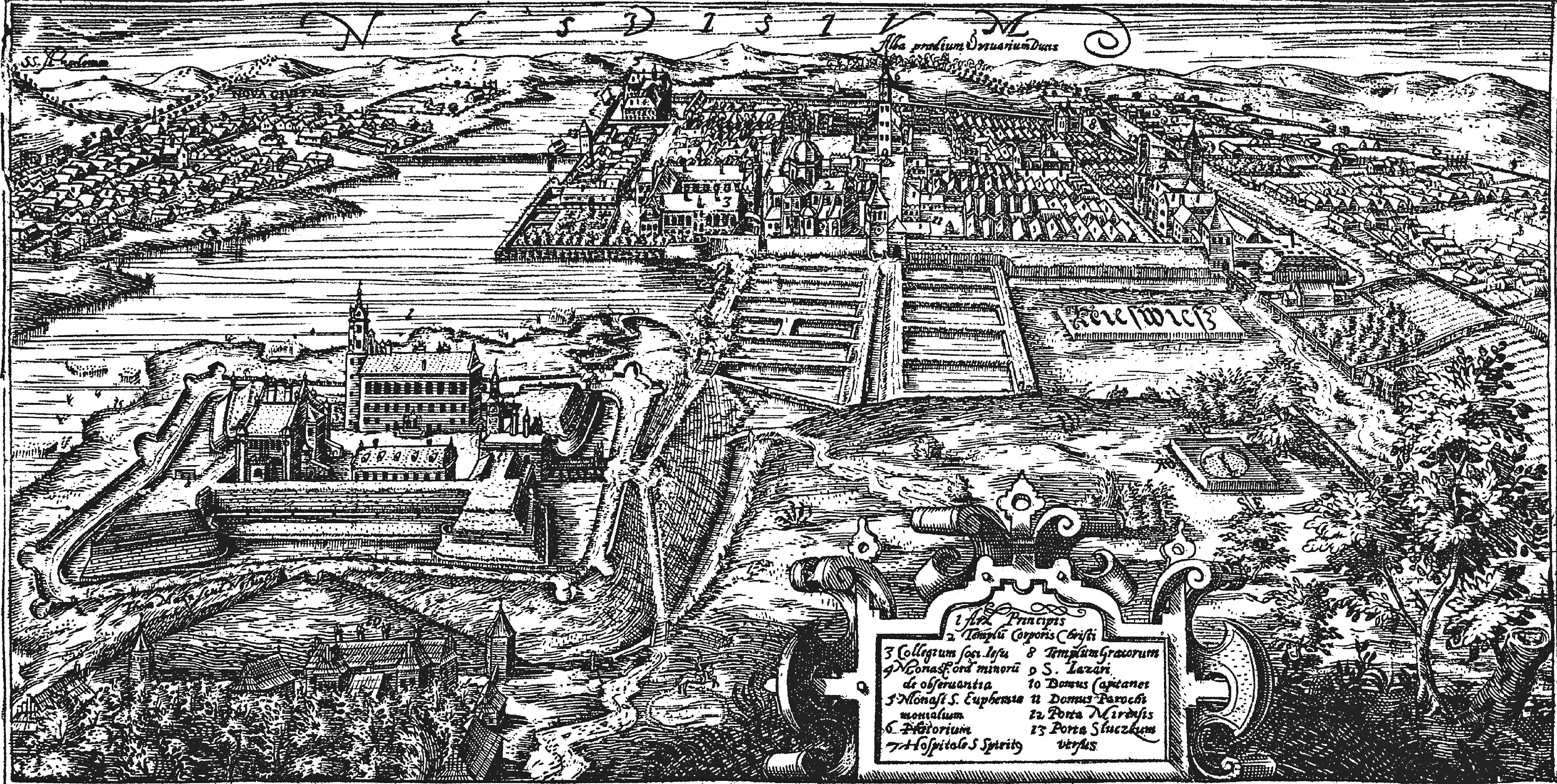
17th-century view of the town

In 1561 or 1562 Maciej Kawęczyński founded the print works of the Polish Brethren. The first Belarusian language book printed in Latin script, a catechism by Symon Budny, was published in Nesvizh in 1562. The Nieśwież Bible (Biblia nieświeska), one of the oldest Polish translations of the Bible, also by Budny, was completed there in 1571 and published in 1572.

Nesvizh Castle was erected in 1583, and between 1584 and 1598 the Benedictines and Jesuit religious orders founded monasteries and a college. At the request of Mikołaj "the Orphan" Radziwiłł Nieśwież was granted Magdeburg town rights by King Stephen Báthory in 1586. Two epidemics affected the city early in the 17th century which led to the establishment of a pharmacy in 1627.

During the Great Northern War of 1700–21, the city was significantly damaged by Swedish troops. It was rebuilt in the 1720s by Michał "Rybeńko" Radziwiłł. In the aftermath of the war, in the 1740s and 1750s he founded a Pas slucki factory which was later moved to Sluck. He introduced a military school, several textile factories and restored the Corpus Christi Church and opened a print works. Michał's wife, Franciszka Urszula Radziwiłłowa, founded the Nieśwież Radziwiłł Theatre, including a choir and a ballet school.

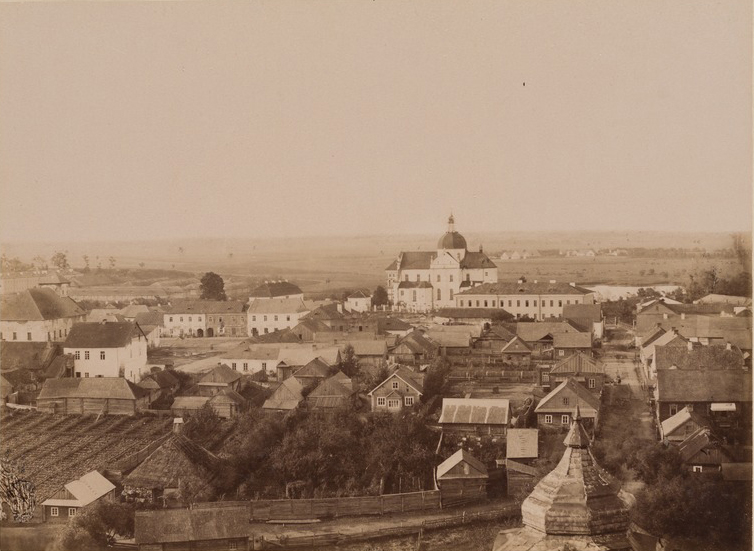
19th-century view of the town

Between 1764 and 1768 the city was occupied by Russian troops, and in 1772, at the First Partition of Lithuania-Poland, the library, which comprised circa 10,000 volumes, along with paintings and other art objects, was seized and transferred to St. Petersburg. Some books from the library were passed to the Russian Academy of Sciences.

After the Second partition of Lithuania-Poland in 1793, Nieśwież was annexed by Russia, and renamed Nesvizh. In 1906, the Polish Society "Oświata" ("Education") in Nesvizh was established, but its activities were hampered by the Russian administration, before banning it at the start of 1910. In 1912 the Russian authorities also liquidated the Roman Catholic Charity Society in Nesvizh.

After the fall of tsarist Russia, fighting broke out for control over the city and surrounding region. The city came under Soviet rule in early 1919 (Polish–Soviet War), the unsuccessful Nieśwież uprising by Polish residents took place during March 14–19, 1919. Nevertheless, Nieśwież was captured by the Poles on April 19, 1919, and was integrated into the reestablished Polish state. It became a powiat in the Nowogródek Voivodeship. In the 1921 census, 45.4% people declared Jewish nationality, 44.4% declared Polish nationality, 9.4% declared Belarusian nationality.

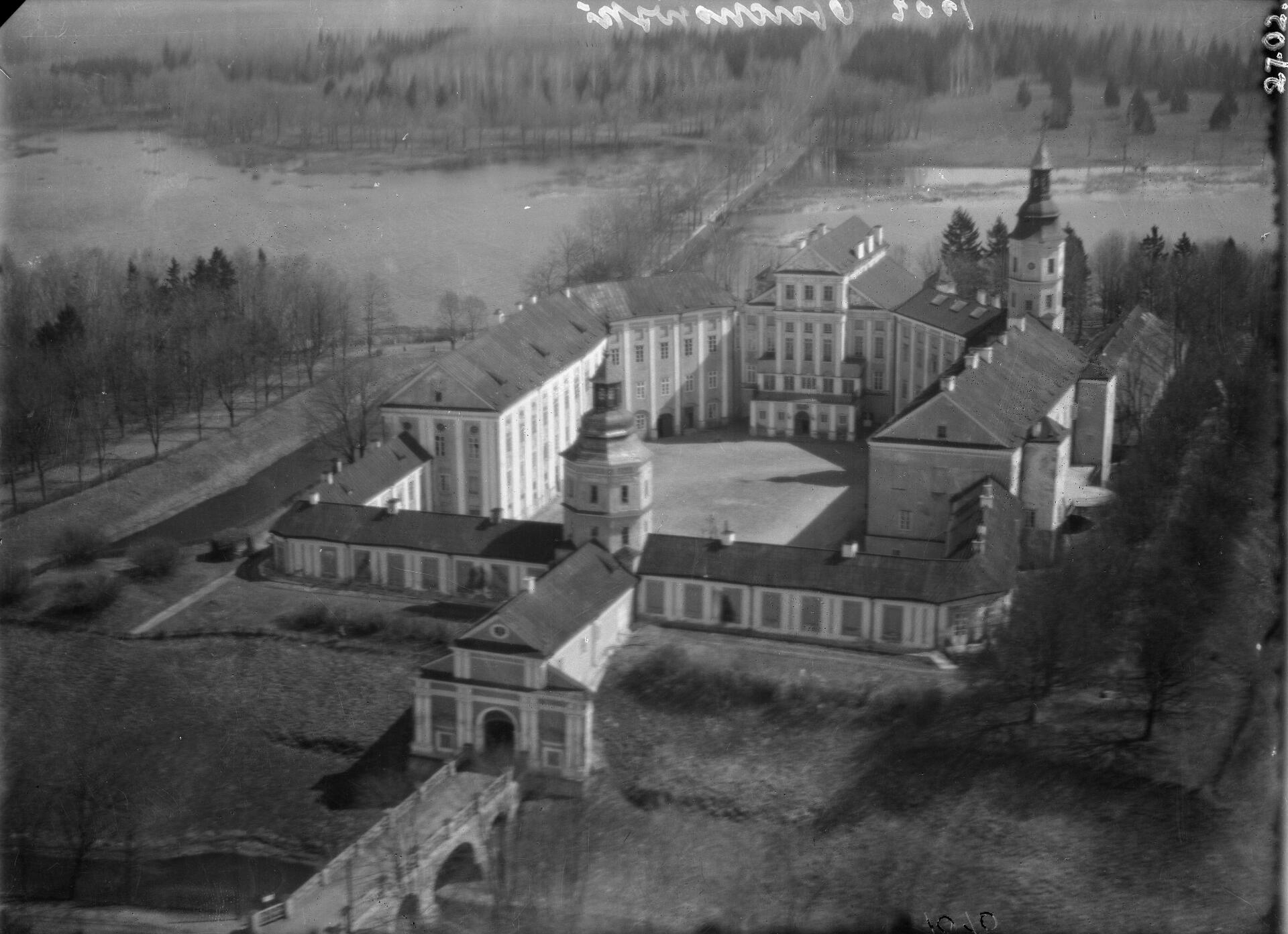
Nesvizh Castle in interwar Poland

Following the Soviet invasion of Poland at the start of World War II in September 1939, it was part of the Byelorussian Soviet Socialist Republic from 1939 to 1941, then was occupied from 1941 to 1944 by the Germans in accordance with Operation Barbarossa. The town was re-occupied by the Soviets during Operation Bagration in 1944. Nyasvizh's status as part of the Byelorussian Soviet Socialist Republic was solidified in accordance with the Potsdam Agreement.

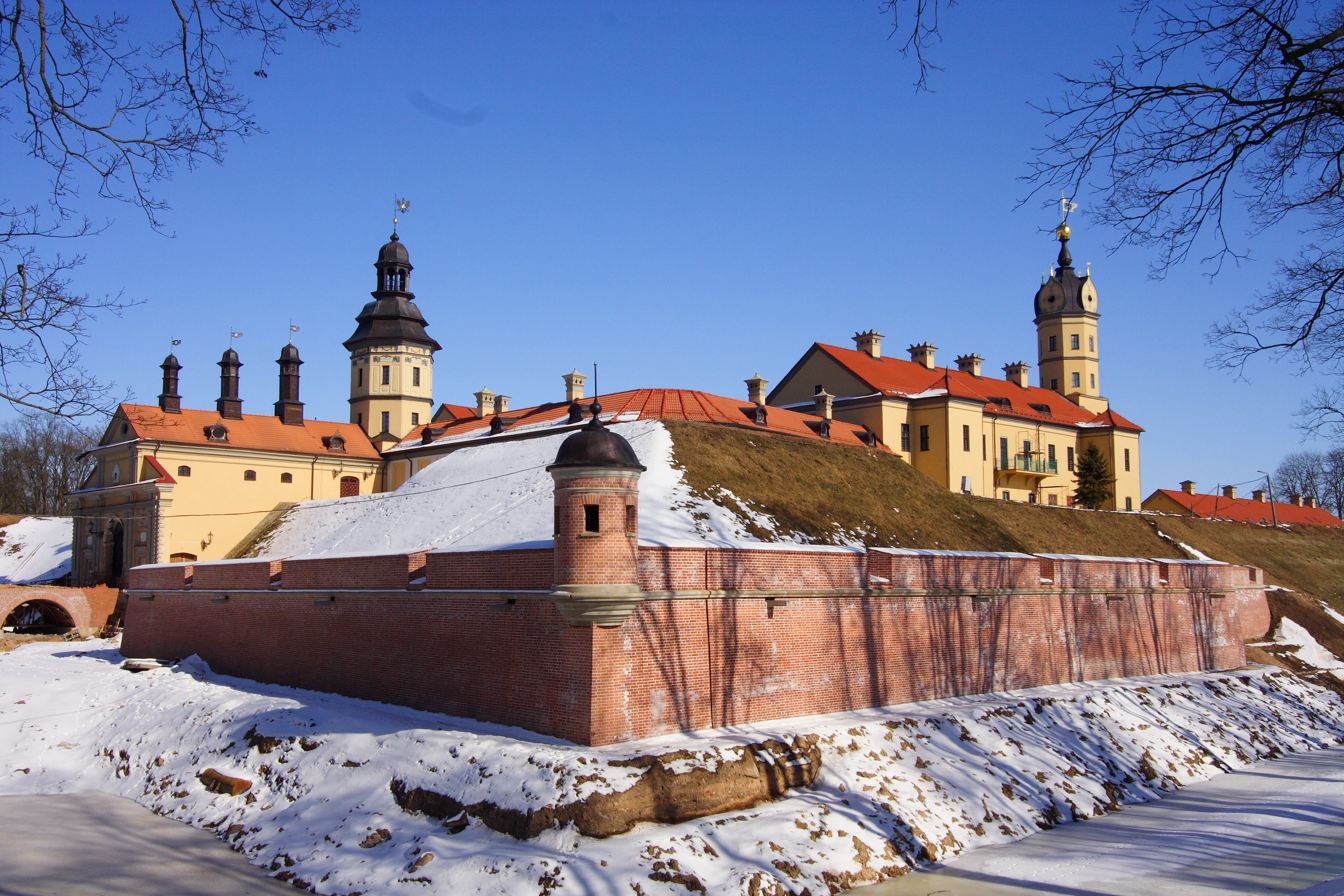
Nesvizh Castle

=== The Jews of Nesvizh ===
The Jewish population in 1900 stood at 4,687, and approx. 4,500 on the eve of the German invasion, Operation Barbarossa. With the occupation from June 27, 1941, a Judenrat was established. On October 30, 4,000 of the town's Jews were murdered and the rest confined to a ghetto. On July 20, 1942, the ghetto was surrounded by Belarusian police and the German commander announced that the ghetto's population would be liquidated with the exception of 30 essential skilled workers. The ghetto's underground organization, based on a Soviet-era Zionist group, called an uprising armed only with one machine gun, small arms but mostly knives. Most of the Jews were killed. A few escaped to nearby forests and joined partisan units, such as the Zhukov Jewish partisan unit.

== Demographics ==
Historical population

Year	Pop.	±%
1897	8,400	—
1921	6,840	−18.6%
1931	7,357	+7.6%
1959	6,700	−8.9%
1970	9,008	+34.4%
1979	11,979	+33.0%
1989	14,039	+17.2%

Year	Pop.	±%
2006	13,883	−1.1%
2018	15,808	+13.9%
2023	15,907	+0.6%
2024	15,968	+0.4%
2025	15,909	−0.4%
2026	15,987	+0.5%

== Notable sites ==
- Nesvizh Castle, the family complex of the Radziwiłł family, is a World Heritage Site.
- The Corpus Christi Church, built between 1587 and 1593>

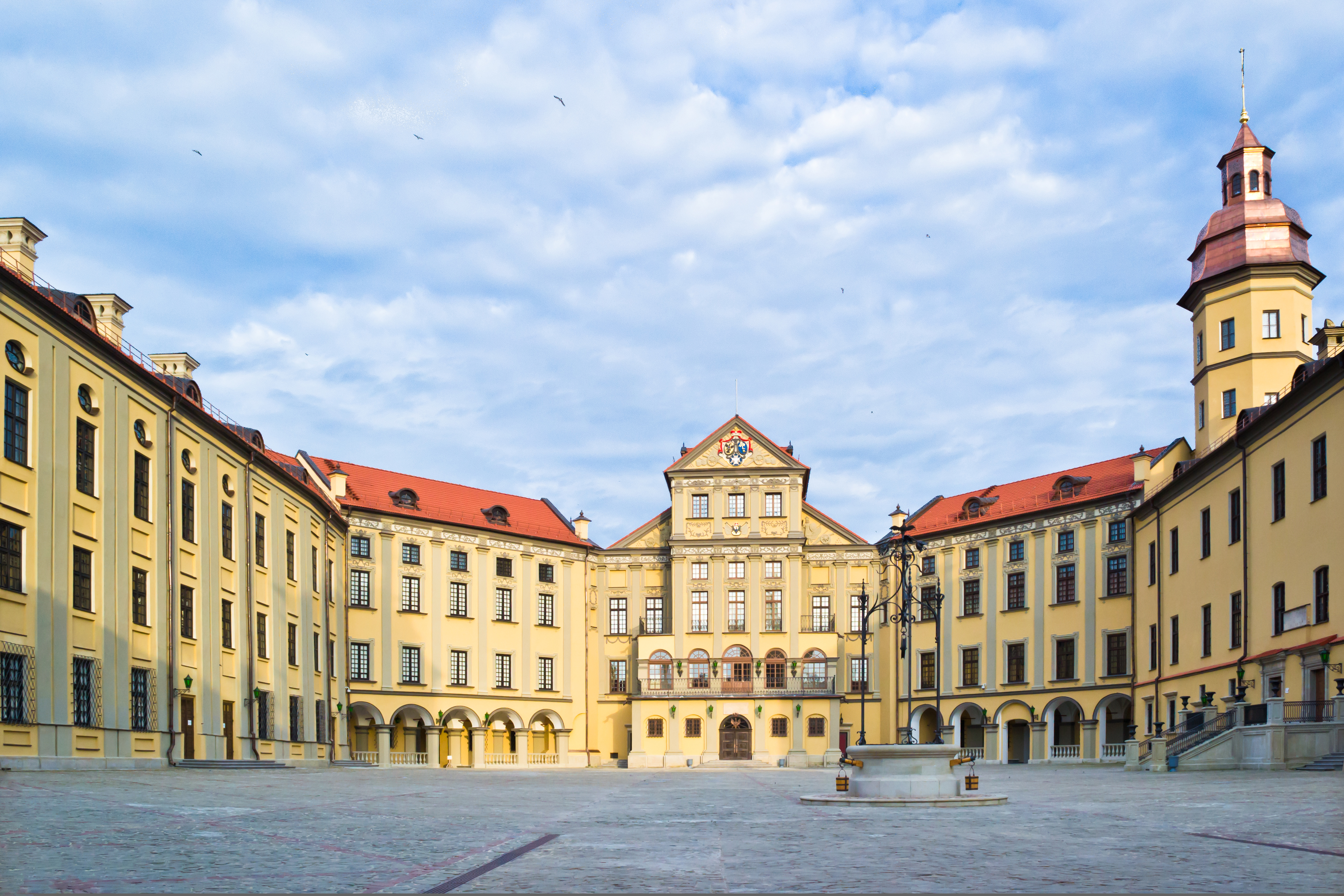
Nesvizh Castle courtyard

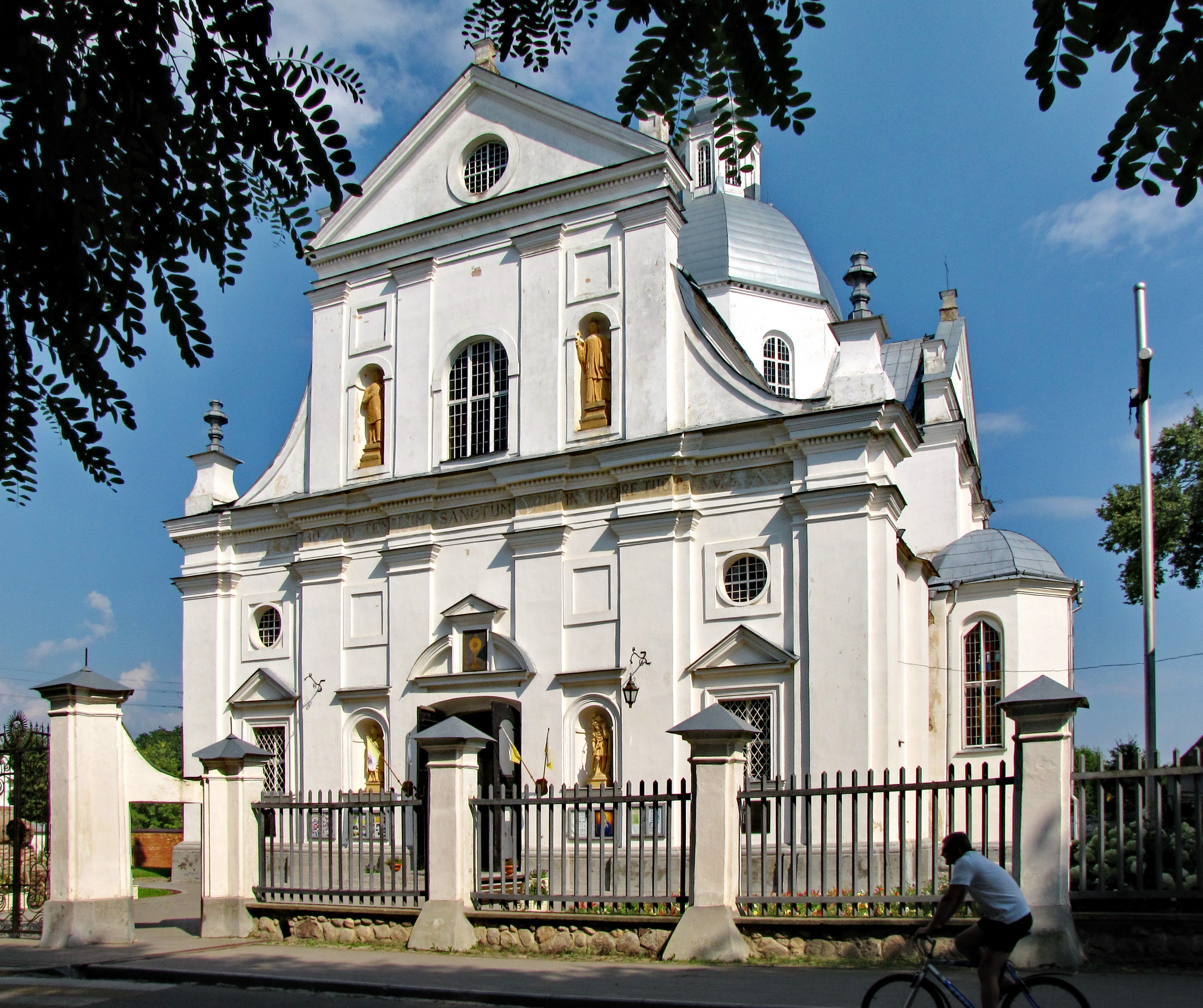
Corpus Christi Church

== International relations ==
Nyasvizh is twinned with:

- Carmel, Israel
- Gatchinsky District, Russia
- Goris, Armenia
- İsmayıllı, Azerbaijan
- Reutov, Russia
- Rosolini, Italy
- Silivri, Turkey
- Zemun (Belgrade), Serbia

== Notable people ==
- Karol Stanisław Radziwiłł (1734–1790), Polish nobleman and politician
- Michael Goleniewski (1922–1993), Polish spy
- Piotr Jaroszewicz (1909–1992), Polish politician
- Jacob S. Raisin (1878–1946), Belarusian-American rabbi
- Max Raisin (1881–1957), Belarusian-American rabbi
- Michał Vituška (1907–1945), Belarusian leader of the Black Cats
