= Karol Stanisław Radziwiłł (1669–1719) =

Polish–Lithuanian nobleman

Karol Stanisław Radziwiłł Grand Chancellor of Lithuania
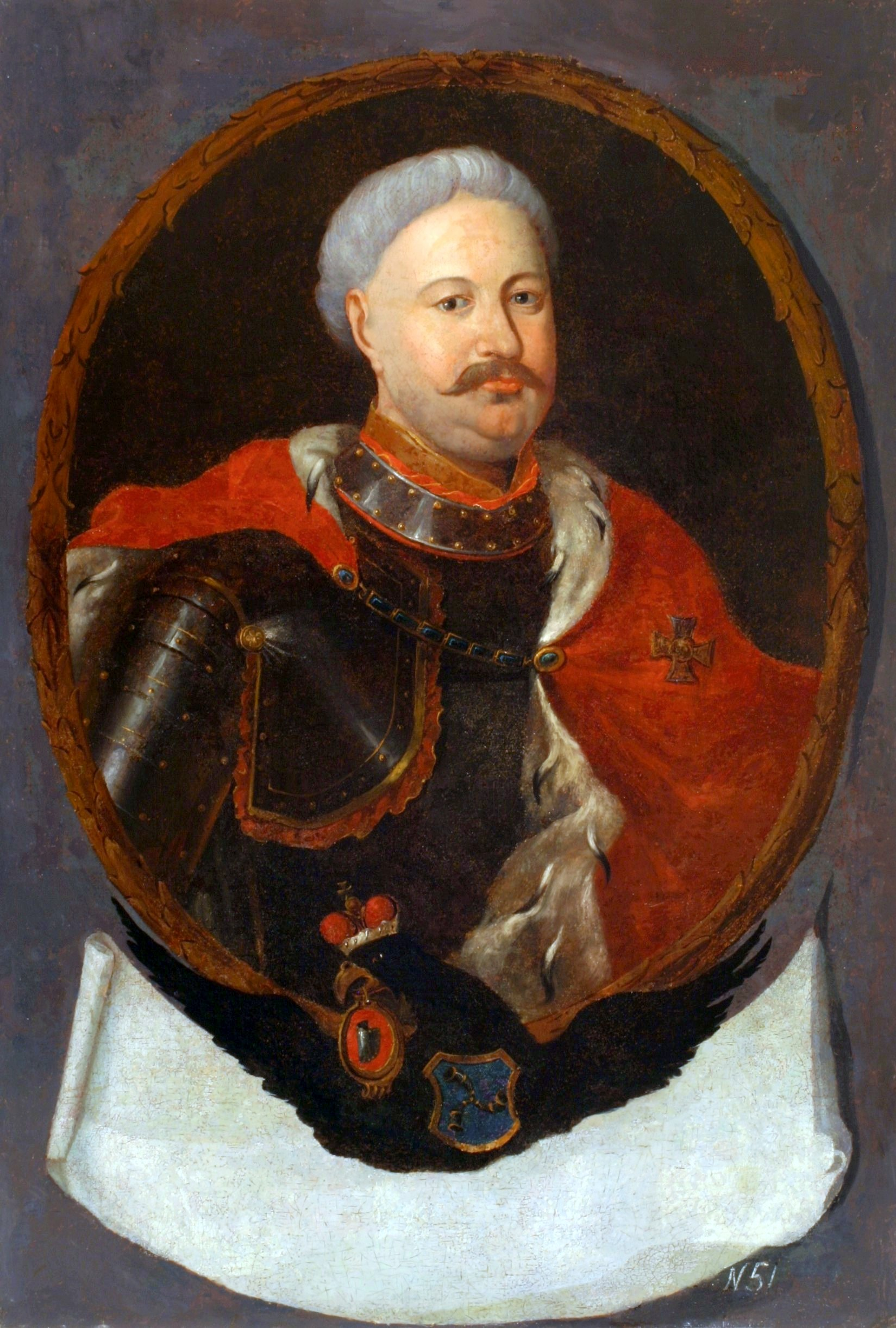
- Born: 27 November 1669; Kraków, Kingdom of Poland
- Died: 2 August 1719 (aged 49); Biała, Kingdom of Poland
- Spouse: Anna Katarzyna Sanguszko
- Children: with Anna Katarzyna Sanguszko: Katarzyna Barbara Radziwiłł; Mikołaj Krzysztof Radziwiłł; Michał Kazimierz Radziwiłł; Konstancja Franciszka Radziwiłł; Karolina Teresa Radziwiłł; Tekla Róża Radziwiłł; Anna Aleksandra Radziwiłł; Albrecht Stanislaw Radziwiłł; Krystyna Elena Radziwiłł; Ludwik Dominik Radziwiłł; Stanisław Jerzy Radziwiłł; Hieronim Florian Radziwiłł
- Parent(s): Michał Kazimierz Radziwiłł; Katarzyna Sobieska

Prince Karol Stanisław Radziwiłł (Lithuanian: Karolis Stanislovas Radvila) (27 November 1669– 2 August 1719) was a Polish–Lithuanian nobleman and diplomat.

Ordynat of Nieśwież, Stolnik of Lithuania in 1685, Equerry of Lithuania in 1686, Deputy Chancellor of Lithuania in 1690, Grand Chancellor of Lithuania in 1698, Bailiff of Vilnius.

He married Anna Katarzyna Sanguszko on March 6, 1691 in Vilnius. He was awarded the Order of the White Eagle.
