= Anna Katarzyna Radziwiłłowa =

Polish–Lithuanian noblewoman (c. 1676 – 1746)

Anna Katarzyna Sanguszko
- Princess
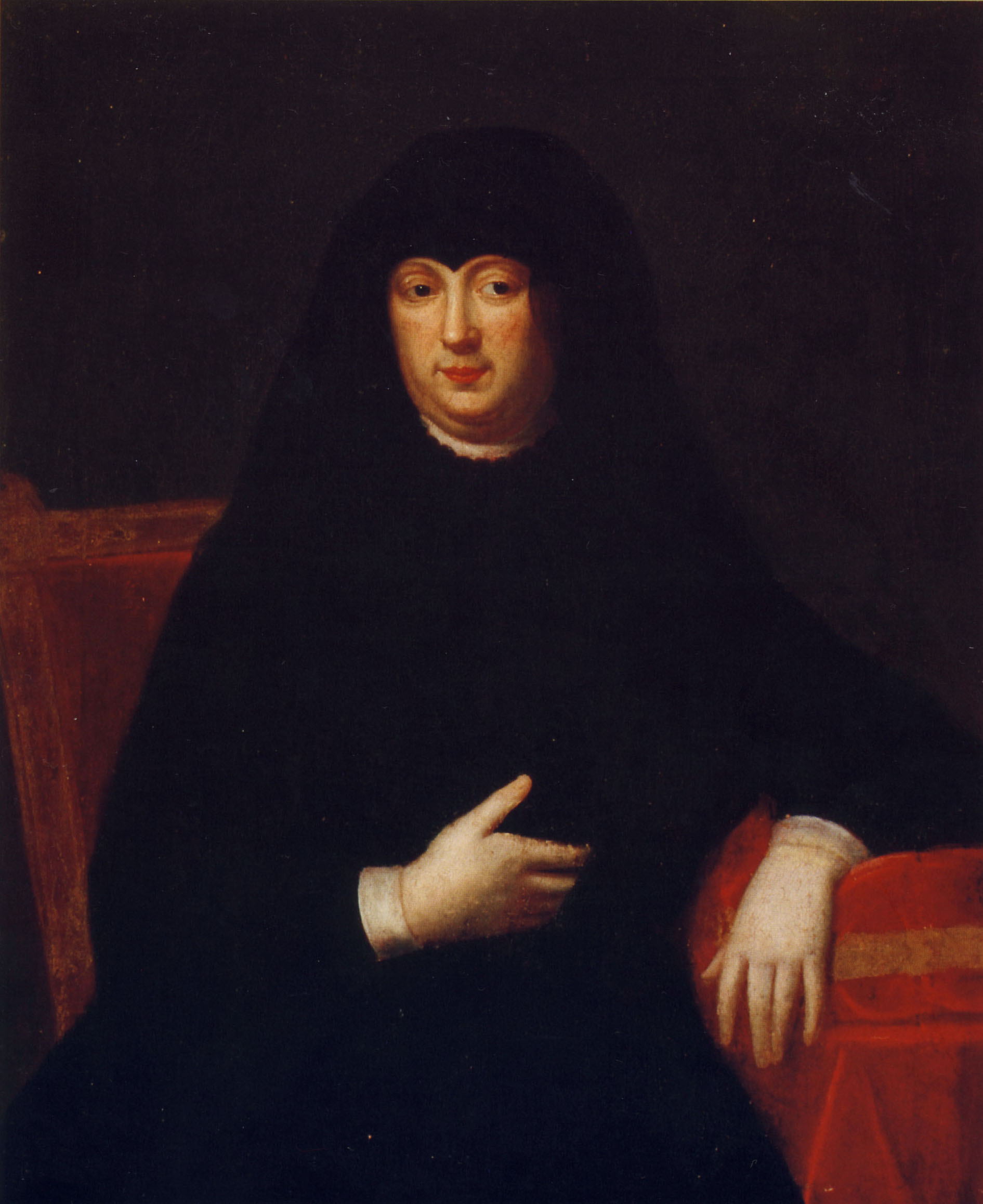
- Coat of arms: Pogoń Litewska
- Full name: Anna Katarzyna Sanguszko
- Born: 1676
- Died: 1746 (aged 69–70)
- Family: Sanguszko
- Spouse: Karol Stanisław Radziwiłł
- Issue: Mikołaj Krzysztof Radziwiłł; Michał Kazimierz Radziwiłł; Hieronim Florian Radziwiłł; Katarzyna Barbara Radziwiłł; Konstancja Franciszka Radziwiłł; Tekla Róża Radziwiłł; Karolina Teresa Radziwiłł
- Father: Hieronim Sanguszko
- Mother: Konstancja Sapieha

Princess Anna Katarzyna Radziwiłłowa (Lithuanian: Ona Kotryna Sanguškaitė; c. 1676–1746) was a Polish–Lithuanian noblewoman and industrialist.

She was the daughter of Hieronim Sanguszko and Konstancja Sapieha, and married Prince Karol Stanisław Radziwiłł March 6, 1691, in Wilno. She was known for her despotic personality and blamed for the negative acts of her husband as grand chancellor of Lithuania. She was also known for her business enterprises: she created a fortune by founding textile factories and glass factories.
