= Tomb of Piotr Wiesiołowski =

17th-century funerary monument in Vilnius

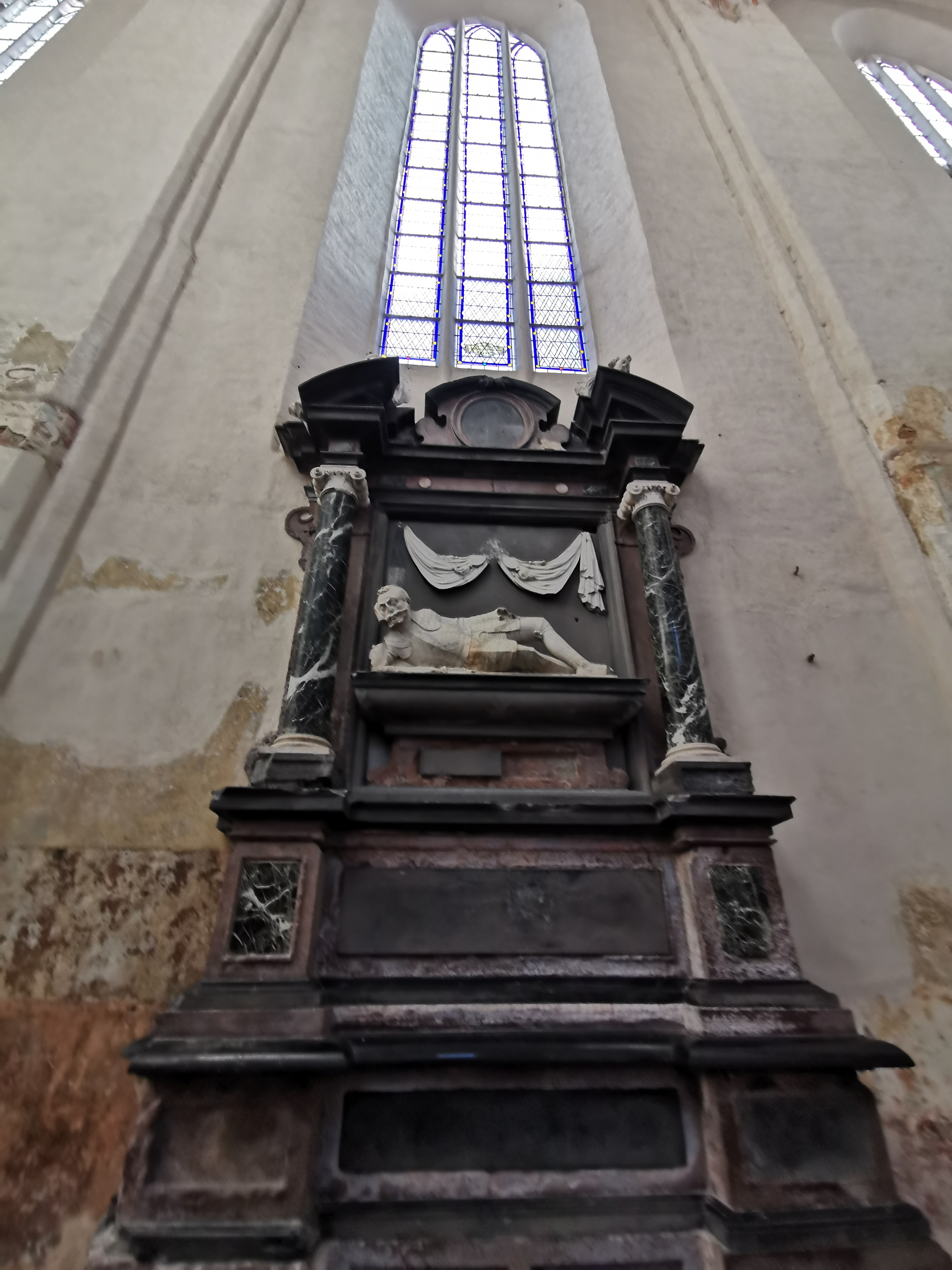
- Artist: Unknown
- Year: 1635
- Type: Effigy, funerary art
- Medium: Polychrome marble
- Subject: Piotr Wiesiołowski
- Location: Church of St. Francis and St. Bernard, Vilnius; Vilnius, Lithuania

The Tomb of Piotr Wiesiołowski is a sculptural effigy of the Grand Marshal of Lithuania Piotr Wiesiołowski (died 1621), located in the Church of St. Francis and St. Bernard (Bernardine Church) in Vilnius. It was created in 1635 in the Mannerist tradition.

== Description ==
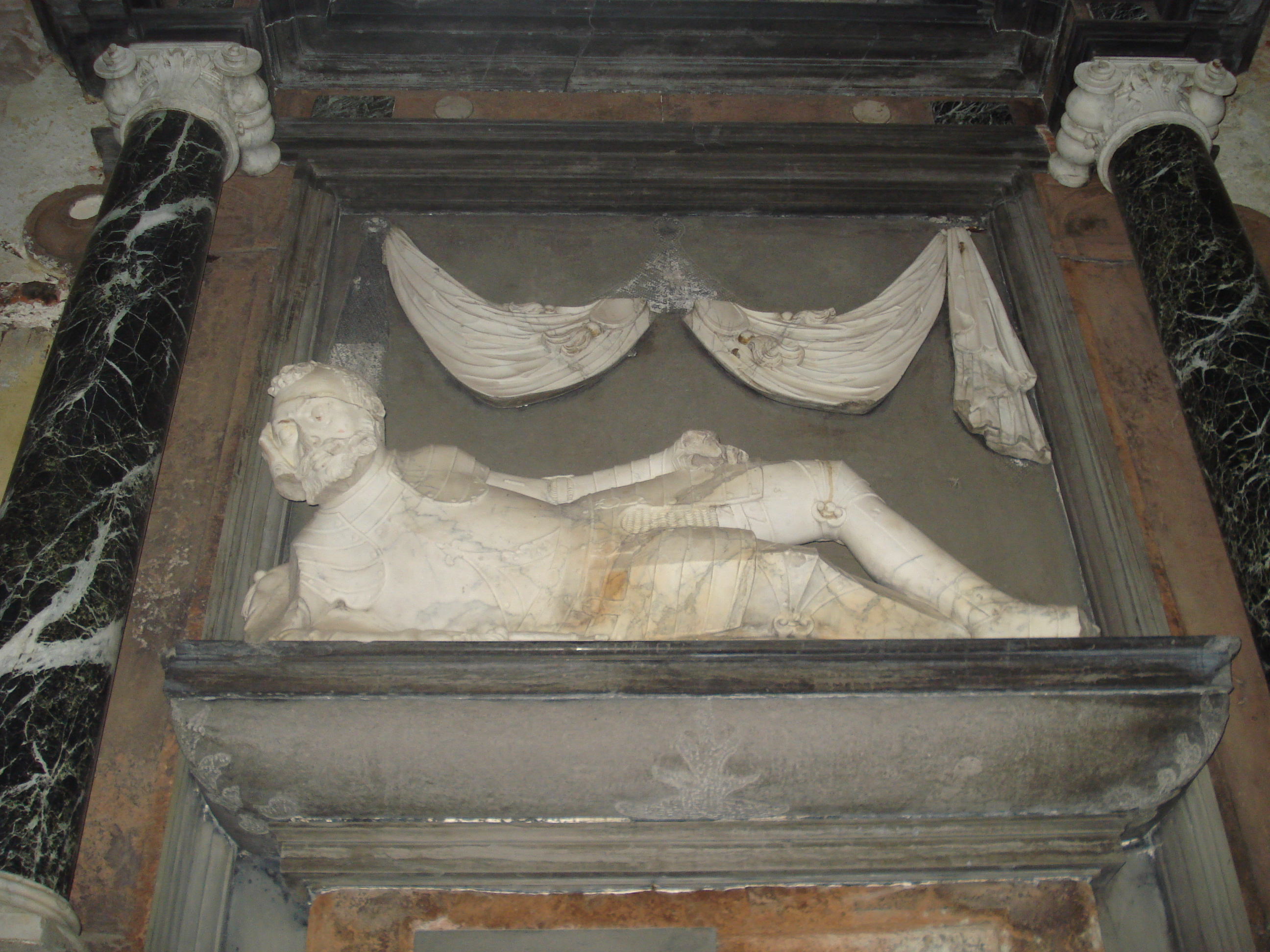
The figure of Piotr Wiesiołowski

Wiesiołowski is depicted as if awakening from sleep: his head is raised, and one leg is bent at a right angle. He leans on one arm. The entire focus is concentrated on the figure of the deceased, which stands out distinctly against the background of a black marble slab.

The decor of the tomb is very restrained compared, for example, to monuments created by Santi Gucci, where restless and broken figures with thrown-back heads seem to drown in excessive emblems and ornamental details. The issue is not merely the richness of the framing or the splendor of the fabric draping the figure, but rather that nothing opposes this passion for decoration — the person eventually becomes part of the ornament because they are treated in principle identically to it.

This thought was aptly emphasized by the Polish art historian Adam Miłobędzki, who wrote that "the craving for decorativeness destroys the logic of antique architectonic divisions. Elements of the latter often become ornamental motifs, identical to plaitwork or grotesque, and are juxtaposed with carefree freedom. Supporting columns are often transformed into the compositional center of the tomb."

The monument is executed in multi-colored marble and is characterized by a striving for coloristic effects, which corresponded to the style of the new era.

== See also ==
- Wiesiołowski family
- Tomb of Lew Sapieha

== Literature ==
- Лявонава, А. К. (1991). Старажытнабеларуская скульптура [Ancient Belarusian Sculpture] (in Belarusian). Мінск: Навука і тэхніка. pp. 83–84. ISBN 5-343-00155-6.
