= Tomb of Stanisław Radziwiłł =

17th-century funerary monument in Vilnius

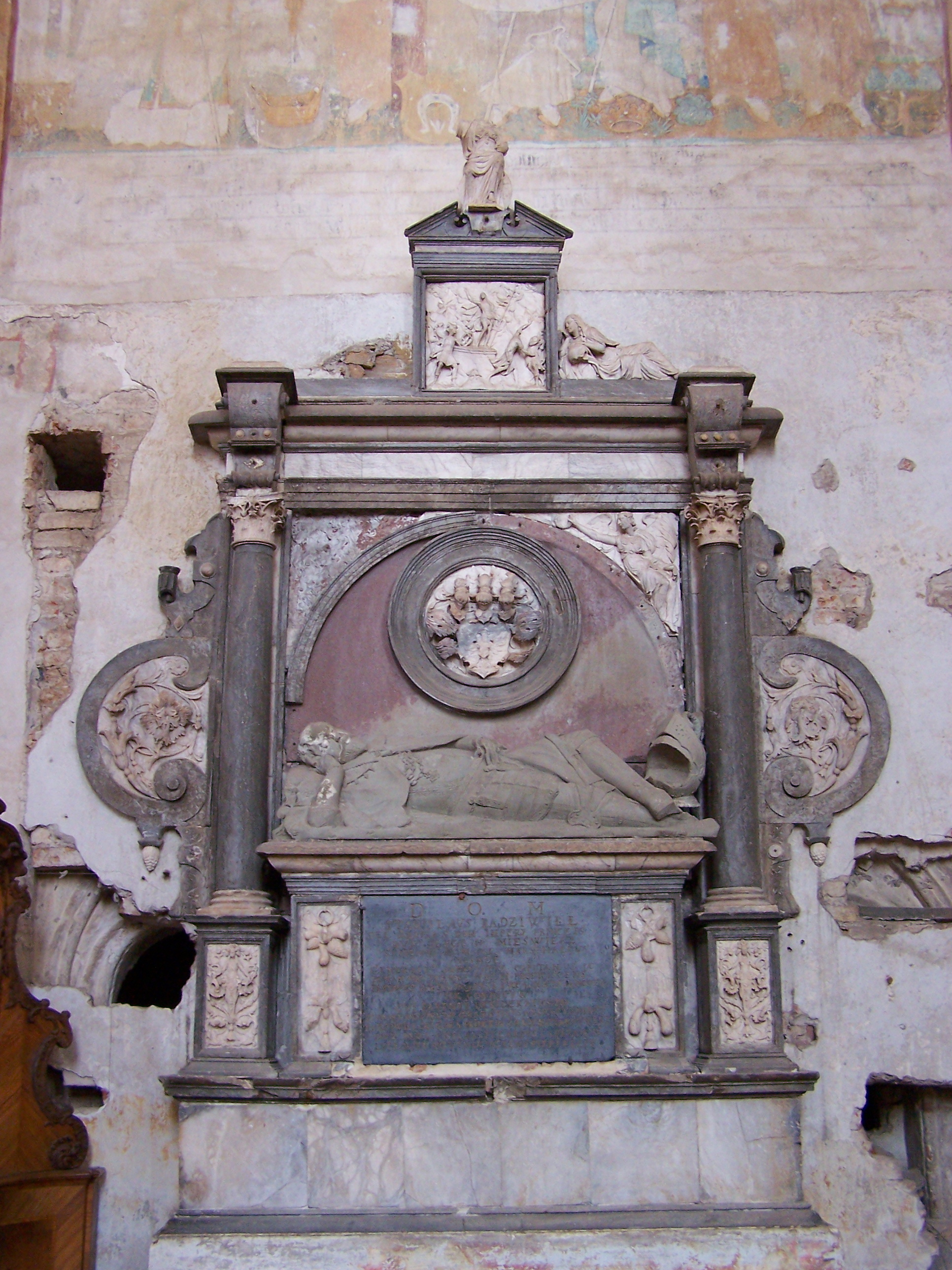
- The tomb in the Bernardine Church
- Artist: Attributed to Willem van den Blocke
- Year: 1618–1623
- Type: Effigy, funerary art
- Medium: Marble, stone
- Subject: Stanisław Radziwiłł
- Location: Church of St. Francis and St. Bernard, Vilnius; Vilnius, Lithuania

The Tomb of Stanisław Radziwiłł is a sculptural effigy of the Grand Marshal of Lithuania Stanisław Radziwiłł (1559–1599), located in the Church of St. Francis and St. Bernard (Bernardine Church) in Vilnius. The monument was erected between 1618 and 1623 by Stanisław's son, Albrecht Stanisław Radziwiłł, who served as the Vice-Chancellor of Lithuania.

The execution of this monument is attributed to Willem van den Blocke (1550–1628), a pupil of the Flemish sculptor Cornelis Floris. The workshop of van den Blocke, where his son, the architect and sculptor Abraham van den Blocke (1572–1628), also worked, competed even with Kraków workshops and executed a wide variety of orders. In some of these monuments, as in the Vilnius one, the deceased are depicted as knights lying on the lid of a sarcophagus.

== Description ==
The tomb is executed in the traditions of Northern Mannerism. Between columns, within an arch, the figure of a sleeping knight rests on the lid of a marble sarcophagus. His head rests on his palm, and his legs are bent at a right angle and crossed. The figure of the knight has elongated proportions, and the pose is graceful.

The columns on both sides are flanked by volutes. The bases of the columns are decorated with cartouches, herms, and mascarons. The upper part of the tomb is shaped like a portico with a broken pediment, crowned with allegorical figures. A multi-figure relief composition of "The Resurrection", filled with dynamics and movement, is incorporated into the portico, flanked by allegorical figures of women.

The monument to Stanisław Radziwiłł is distinguished by its characteristic artistic and stylistic design. Willem van den Blocke paid great attention to the decorative framing of monuments, but at the same time strove to maintain a balance between the decorative and architectural parts.

== See also ==
- Radziwiłł family
- Tomb of Lew Sapieha

== Literature ==
- Лявонава, А. К. (1991). Старажытнабеларуская скульптура [Ancient Belarusian Sculpture] (in Belarusian). Мінск: Навука і тэхніка. pp. 82–83. ISBN 5-343-00155-6.
