= Tomb of Krzysztof Mikołaj Radziwiłł =

17th-century funerary monument in Nyasvizh

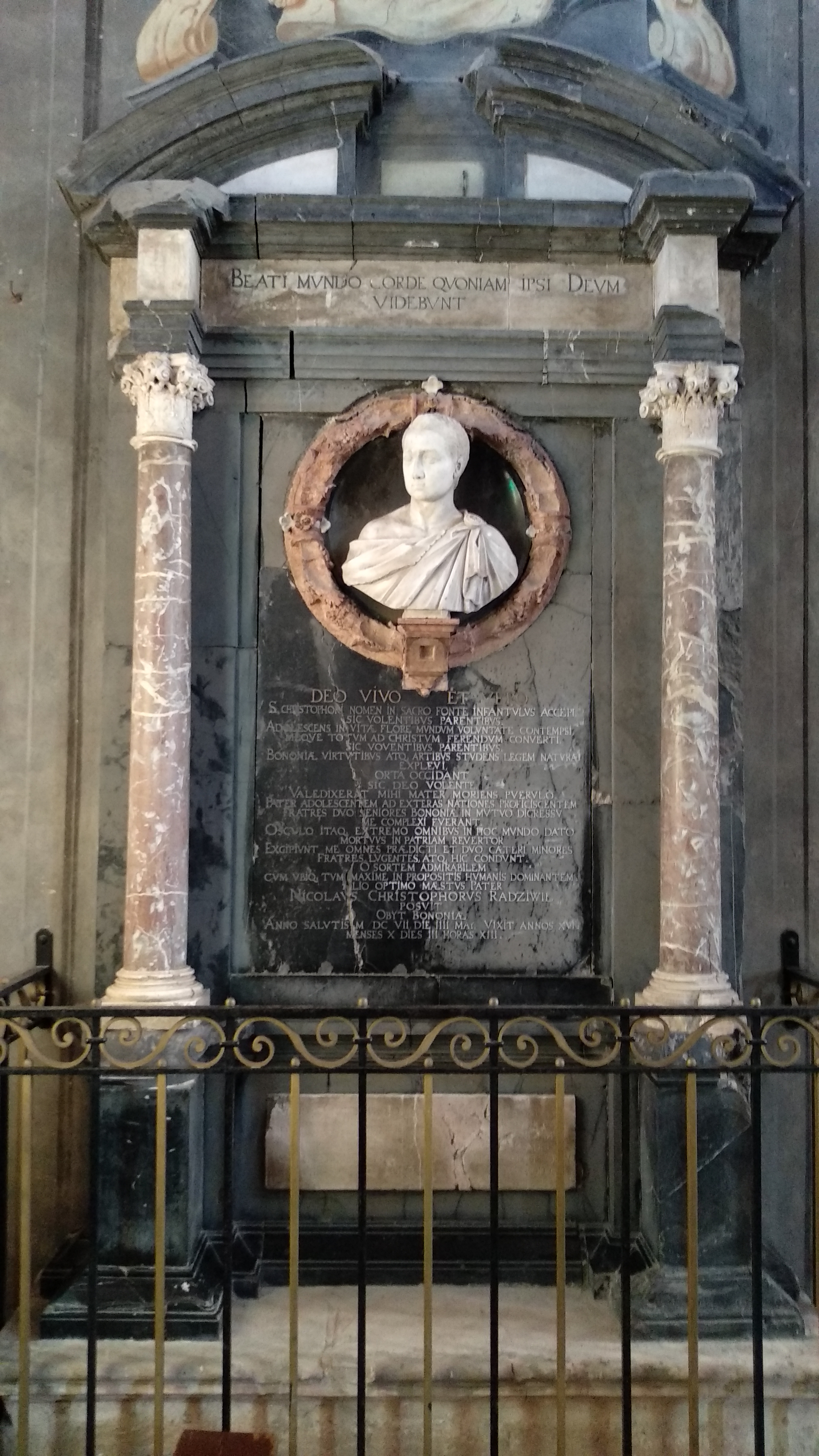
- Artist: Unknown
- Year: After 1607
- Type: Funerary monument, bust
- Medium: Polychrome marble
- Subject: Krzysztof Mikołaj Radziwiłł
- Location: Corpus Christi Church, Nyasvizh; Nyasvizh , Belarus

The Tomb of Krzysztof Mikołaj Radziwiłł is a funerary monument featuring a bust, located in the Corpus Christi Church in Nyasvizh, Belarus. It is considered the earliest example of this specific type of tomb monument on the territory of Belarus. It commemorates Krzysztof Mikołaj Radziwiłł (1590–1607), the son of Mikołaj Krzysztof Radziwiłł the Orphan, who died while studying at the University of Bologna at the age of 16. The tomb was created from multi-colored marble after 1607.

== Description and style ==
The monument features a bust of the youth, framed by a laurel wreath, placed between columns that support a frieze and a broken pediment. The free, picturesque folds of his clothing drape elegantly over his shoulder. The fine processing of the marble, the skillful selection of colors, and the harmonious proportions of the bust in relation to the architectural components and the inscription plaque testify to the high professional level of the sculptor.

The monument is executed according to the canons of the Italian Renaissance, which demanded a certain idealization, generalization of the image, and a harmonious combination of outer and inner beauty. At the same time, the color and architectural-plastic solution already show stylistic signs of the Baroque, with its inclination towards chiaroscuro and color contrasts, as well as a complex architectural composition.

Typologically, this tomb and the character of the portrait (in a laurel wreath) have analogues in Italian art, such as the monument to Francisco de Toledo in Santa Maria Maggiore (1596) or the tomb of Giovanni Battista Santoni by Gian Lorenzo Bernini in the Basilica of Santa Prassede (1615–1616).

Stylistic analogues in Italian art

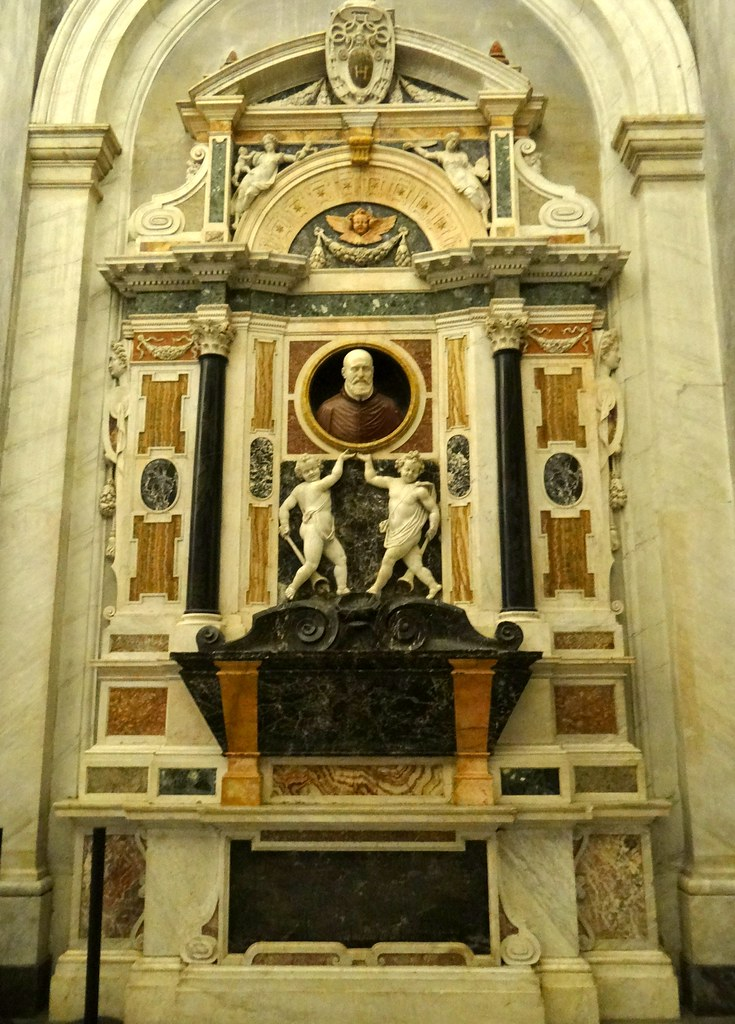
Tomb of Francisco de Toledo

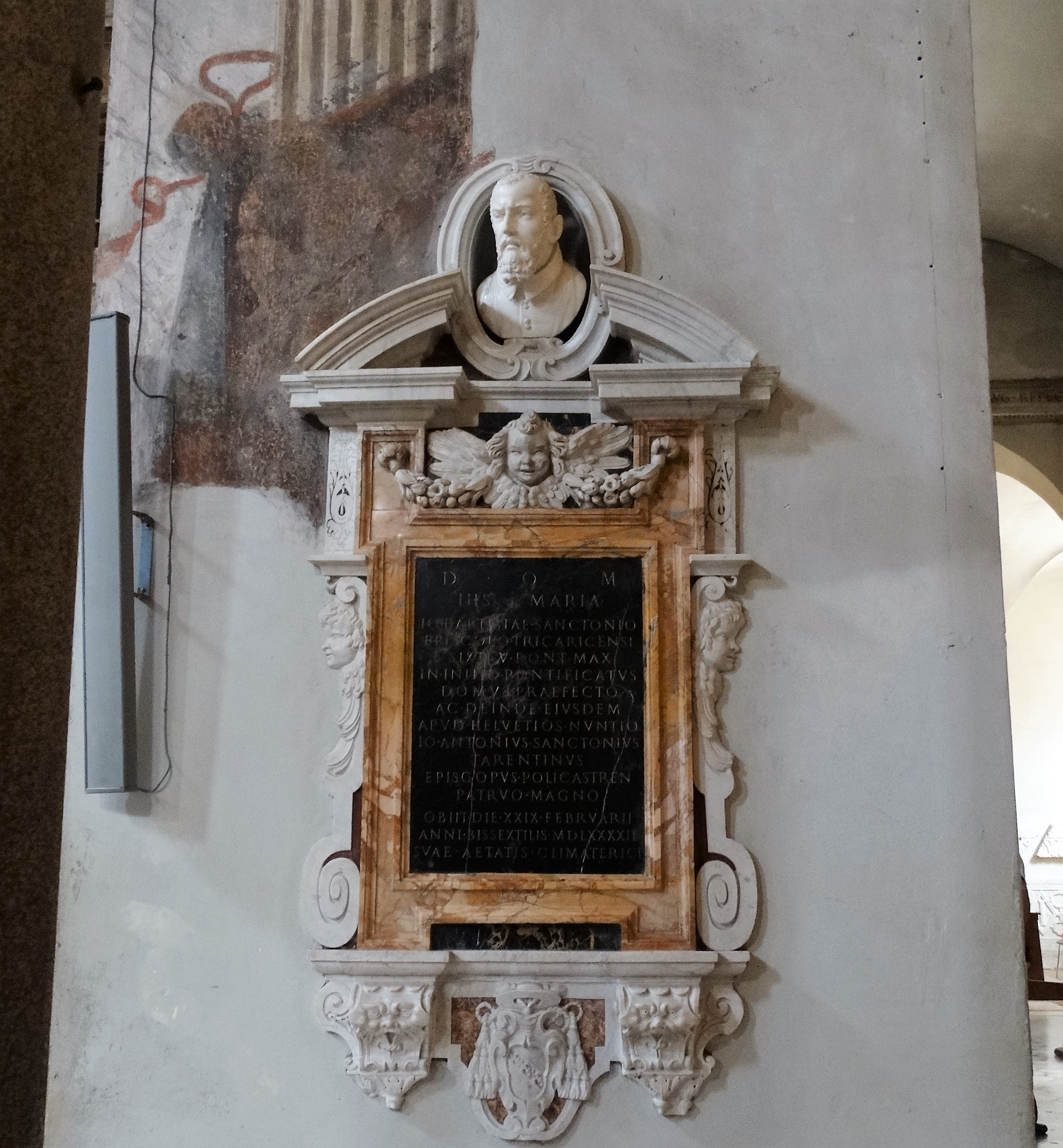
Tomb of Giovanni Battista Santoni by Gian Lorenzo Bernini

== See also ==
- Radziwiłł family
- Tomb of Lew Sapieha

== Literature ==
- Лявонава, А. К. (1991). Старажытнабеларуская скульптура [Ancient Belarusian Sculpture] (in Belarusian). Мінск: Навука і тэхніка. pp. 95–96. ISBN 5-343-00155-6.
