= Tomb of Paweł Stefan Sapieha and his wives =

17th-century funerary sculpture in Belarus

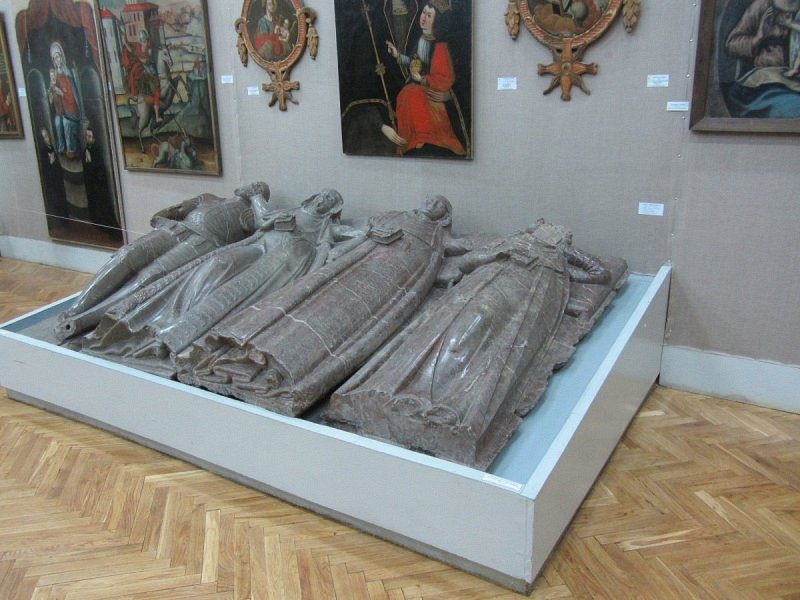
- The tomb on display at the Museum of Ancient Belarusian Culture
- Artist: Unknown (possibly Sebastiano Sala)
- Year: After 1635
- Type: Effigy, funerary art
- Medium: Marble
- Subject: Paweł Stefan Sapieha and his three wives
- Location: Museum of Ancient Belarusian Culture; Minsk, Belarus

The Tomb of Paweł Stefan Sapieha and his wives is a sculptural effigy of the Vice-Chancellor of Lithuania Paweł Stefan Sapieha and his three wives, originally located in the Franciscan Church in the village of Halshany (Hrodna Region). Currently, it is preserved in the Museum of Ancient Belarusian Culture in Minsk.

The tomb was created after 1635, the year of Sapieha's death. Historically, it was located in the founder's chapel, in one of the wings of the transept. It is considered a significant example of Renaissance and Mannerist sculpture in the Grand Duchy of Lithuania.

== Description ==
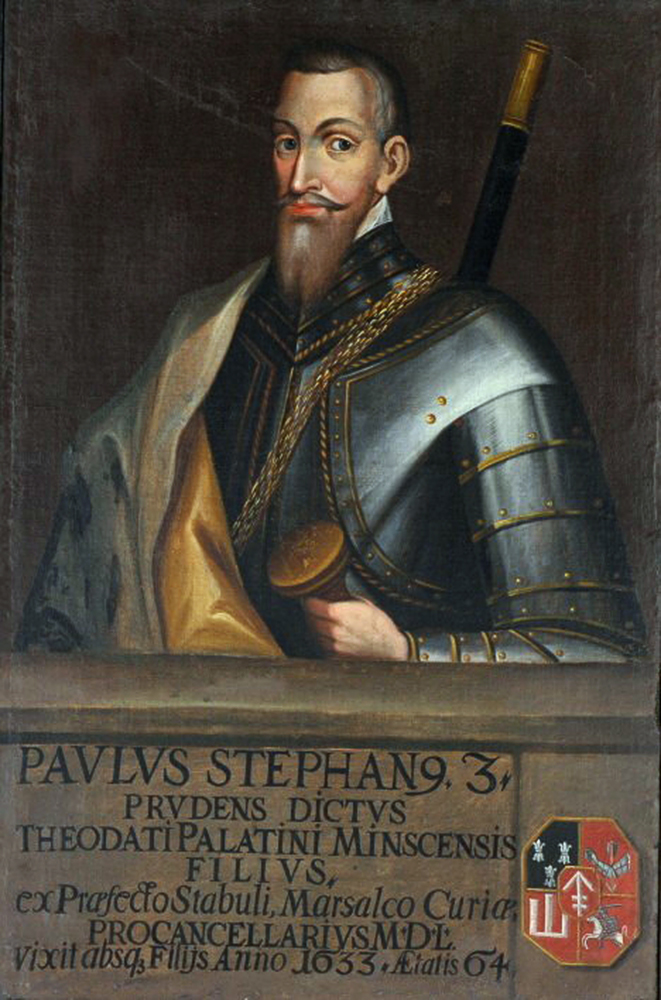
Portrait of Paweł Sapieha from the Kodeń gallery

The tomb was likely a multi-tiered structure originally. Only four marble figures have survived: those of Paweł Sapieha and three of his four wives: Regina (née Dybowska), Katarzyna (née Gosławska), and Zofia (née Daniłowicz).

They are depicted in reclining positions, with their heads resting on pillows and supported by their left arms ("sleeping pose"). Sapieha is portrayed in ceremonial knightly armor, turned towards his wives, who are holding prayer books testifying to their piety. The figures are characterized by majesty, emphasized by the smooth lines of closed contours and the drapery of their clothing, which reveals the plasticity of slightly elongated forms. Their faces are full of tranquility, appearing timeless and devoid of emotion, clearly embodying dignity and nobility.

The execution of the figures is marked by high craftsmanship. The sculptor demonstrated a deep understanding of marble as a material, using varied processing techniques to maximize its visual impact. The texture of Sapieha's armor, the fur trimmings, and the fabrics of the wives' dresses are rendered with great precision. The hard metal of the armor contrasts with the soft modeling of the face and the large curls of the beard and mustache.

== History and reconstruction ==
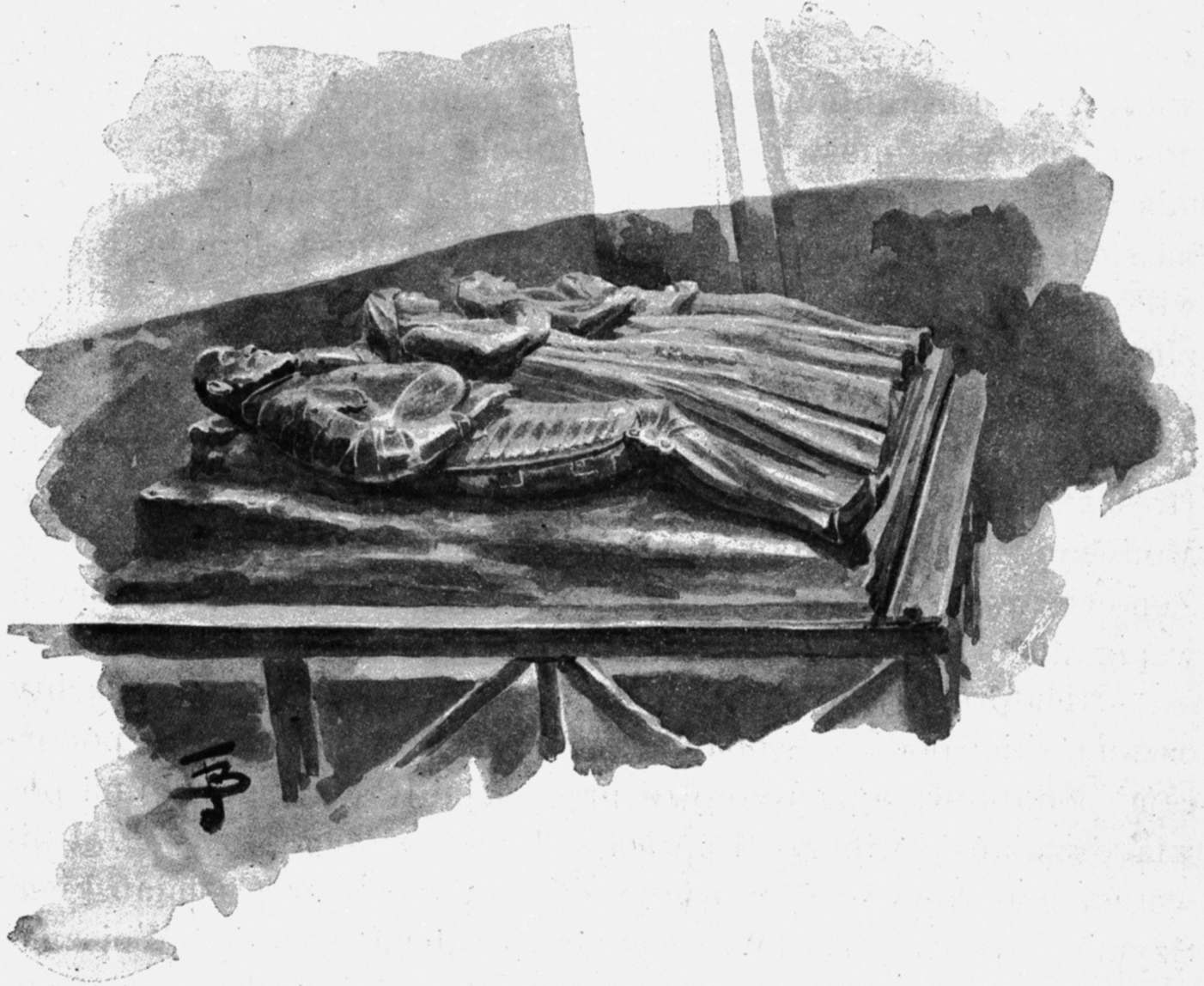
The figures in the Franciscan church in Halshany (1897 drawing by B. Tamaševič)

=== Original appearance and attribution ===
No images of the original tomb structure have survived. However, a 1675 inventory describes it as: "On the side, a tomb (epitaphium) very beautiful, like an altar, in whose structure are three figures of wives, and [the founder] himself lies fourth at the top. In the same structure are nine alabaster figures, as well as two little angels."

This description suggests a multi-tiered architectural composition similar to the tomb of Lew Sapieha and his two wives in the Church of St. Michael in Vilnius. Both monuments share the Sapieha family name, the concept of a joint burial with wives, artistic similarities, and the time of creation (Lew Sapieha died in 1633, Paweł in 1635).

Although there is no documentary evidence, it is believed that the author of the Halshany tomb could be the Italian architect and sculptor Sebastiano Sala (or his circle), who worked in the Polish–Lithuanian Commonwealth at that time and is associated with the Vilnius tomb.

The architectural part of the monument was likely lost in the late 18th century when the old church in Halshany was dismantled to build a new Baroque one. By the 19th century, the figures were lying separately on the church floor.

=== Modern display ===
For a long time in the Museum of Ancient Belarusian Culture, the figures were displayed horizontally next to each other. In early 2025, following a museum reconstruction, the display was redesigned to resemble the probable original tiered structure. The project was led by art historian Barys Lazuka, with consultation from historian Syarhei Hruntou. The new display attempts to recreate the composition based on the Vilnius analogue, arranging the sculptures vertically.

There have been proposals to return the sculptures to Halshany (either to the church or the restored Halshany Castle), but local clergy have expressed reservations, and experts argue that a museum environment ensures better preservation.

== Gallery ==
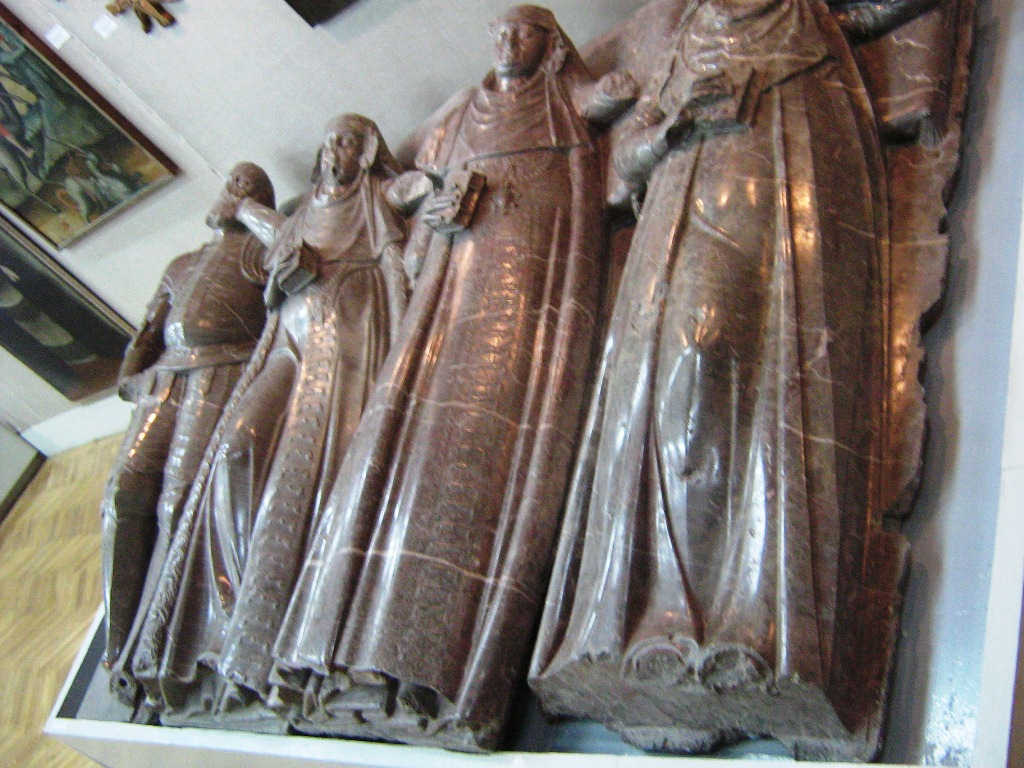
Tomb of Paweł Sapieha and his wives in the museum (pre-2025 display)

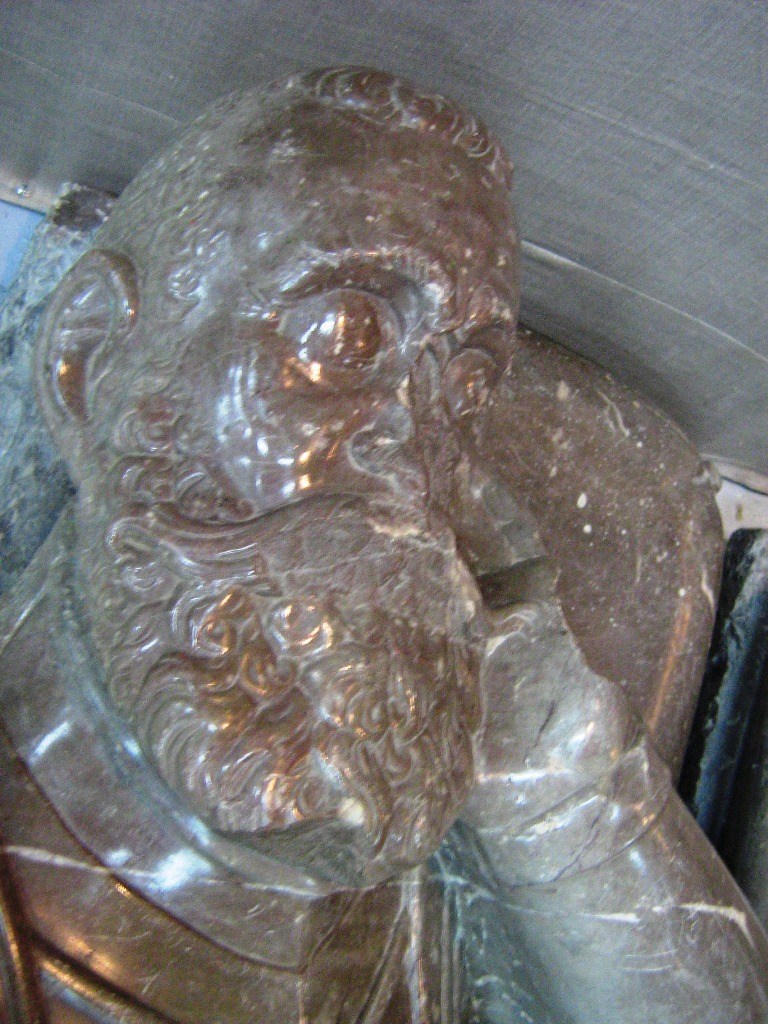
Detail of the sculpture of Paweł Sapieha

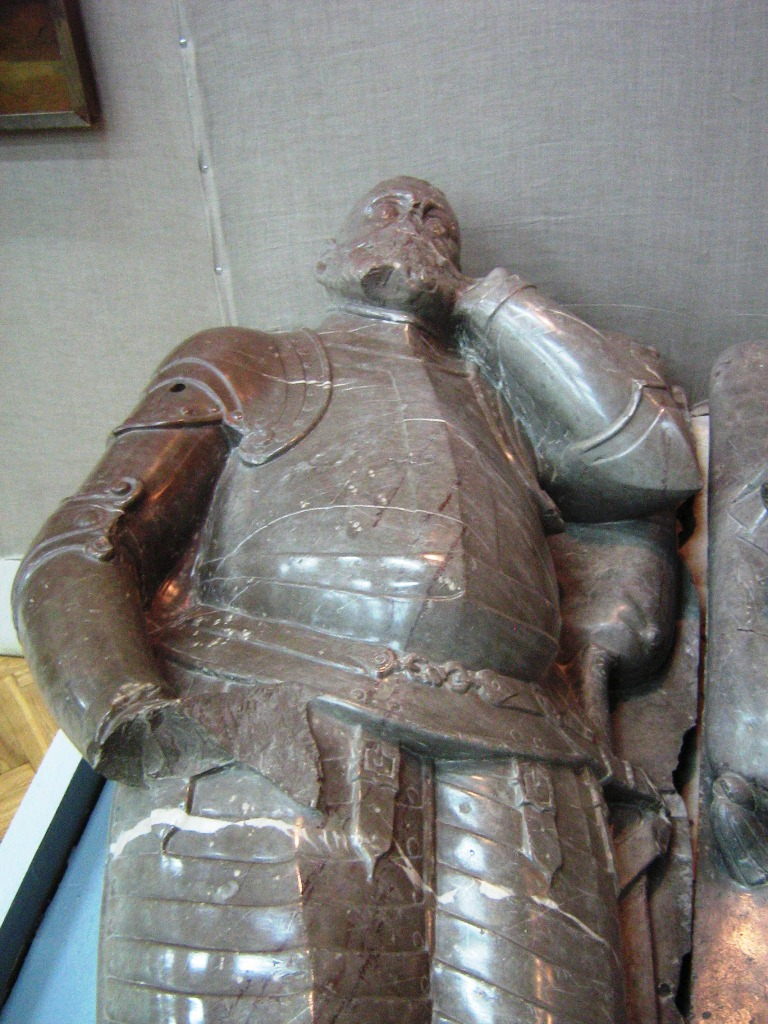
Figure of Paweł Sapieha

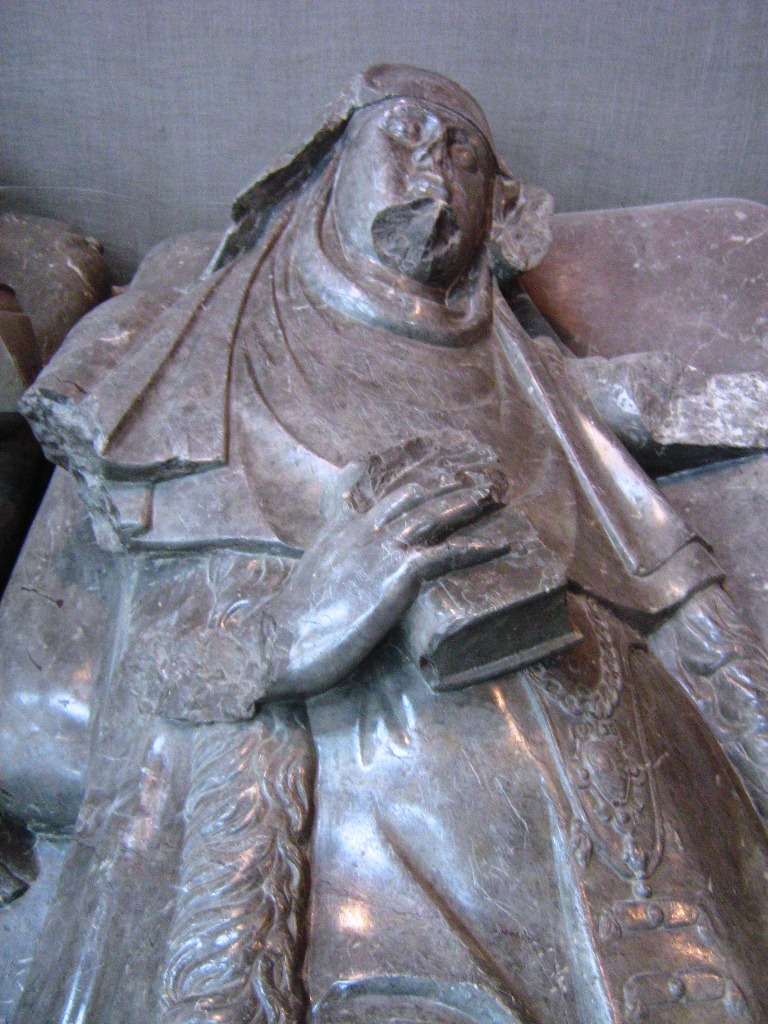
One of the wives holding a prayer book

== See also ==
- Sapieha family
- Halshany Castle

== Literature ==
- Лявонава, А. К. (1991). Старажытнабеларуская скульптура [Ancient Belarusian Sculpture] (in Belarusian). Мінск: Навука і тэхніка. p. 85. ISBN 5-343-00155-6.
