= Krzysztof Michał Sapieha =

Polish–Lithuanian noble (1607–1631)

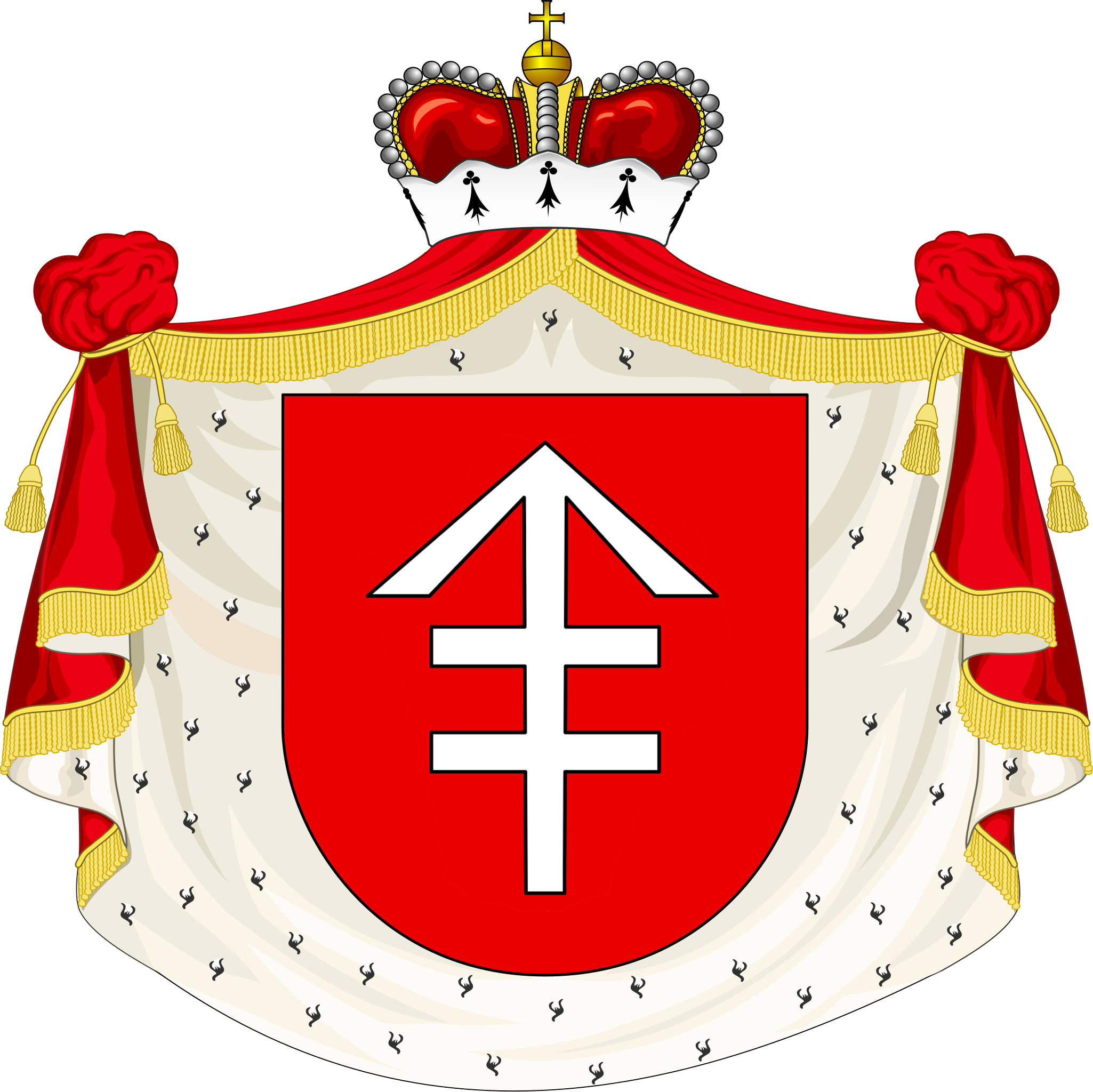
Coat of arms of Sapieha family

Krzysztof Michał Sapieha (Lithuanian: Kristupas Mykalojus Sapiega) (1607–1631) was a Polish–Lithuanian Commonwealth nobleman, Podstoli of Lithuania (1630), Great Lithuanian Writer (1631).

Son of Lew Sapieha. Studied abroad. Afflicted with tuberculosis from 1624, this illness led to his death at the age of 24. Before his death, he had a promising career - political (Sejm deputy of 1629 and 1630, official from 1630) and literary - author of a (now lost) history of the False Dmitriys and a philosophical text.
