= Tomb of Lew Sapieha =

17th-century funerary monument in Vilnius

Tomb of Lew Sapieha and his wives
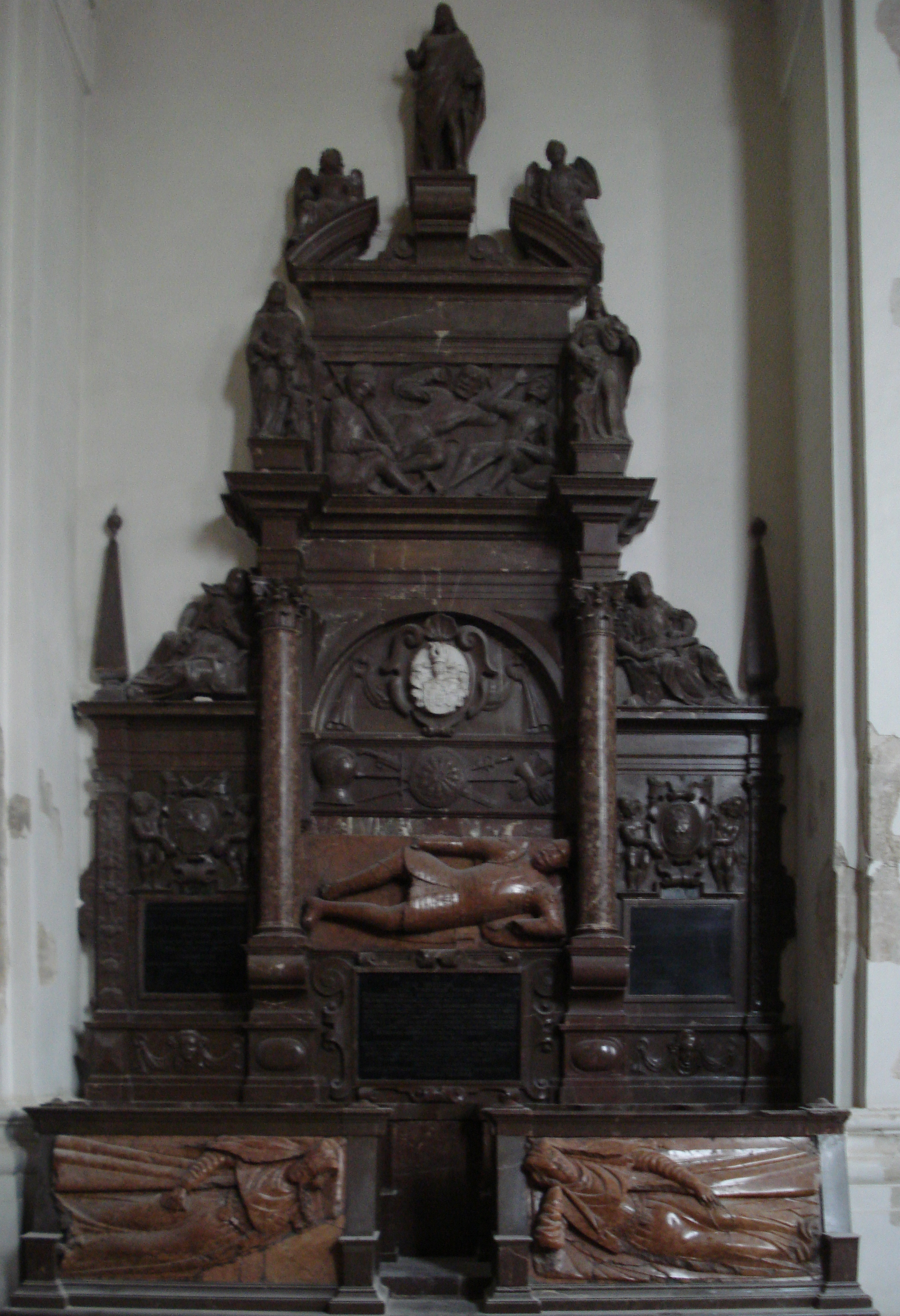
- The tomb of Lew Sapieha and his wives in the Church of St. Michael, Vilnius
- Artist: Sebastiano Sala
- Year: 1640s
- Type: Funerary monument
- Medium: Marble, sandstone
- Subject: Lew Sapieha, Elżbieta Radziwiłł, Dorota Firlej
- Dimensions: 25 cm (10 in)
- Location: Church of St. Michael; Vilnius, Lithuania

The Tomb of Lew Sapieha is a tiered funerary monument dedicated to the Grand Chancellor and Grand Hetman of Lithuania Lew Sapieha and his two wives, located in the Church of St. Michael the Archangel in Vilnius. It is considered one of the most valuable monuments of early Baroque sacred sculpture in the region.

== History ==
The tomb is heterogeneous and was created in several stages. First, two slabs were made for the wives: Elżbieta Radziwiłł (died 1591) and Dorota Firlej (died 1611), following their deaths. Later, a third slab was created after the death of Lew Sapieha himself in 1633. These three slabs were incorporated into the general composition of an imposing monument created by the talented Northern Italian sculptor Sebastian Sala in the 1640s. Other sculptors working in Sala's workshop also participated in the execution of the monument.

== Architecture ==
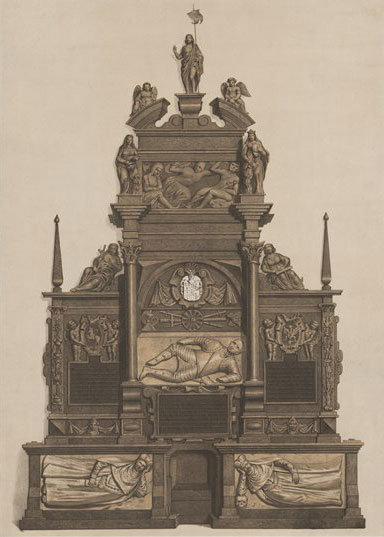
Drawing of the tomb, 19th century

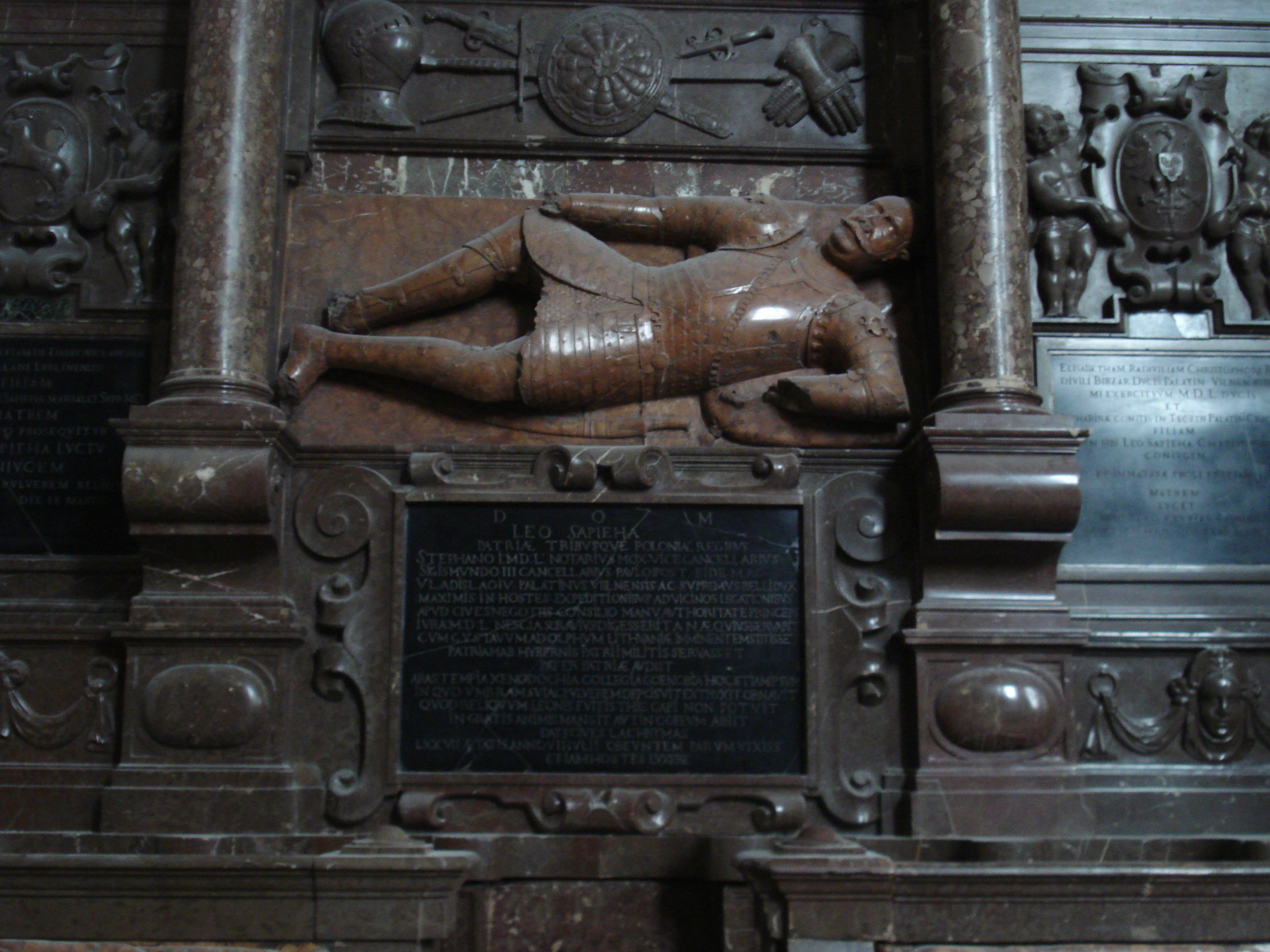
Relief image of Lew Sapieha

The composition of the monument is quite complex and has significant dimensions, with a height of about 10 meters. It organically combines three tombstones with relief images, three black marble plaques with texts, coats of arms, and attributes of military glory and valor.

A significant place in the figurative order of the monument is given to the figures of Saint Elizabeth and Saint Dorothy — the patron saints of the deceased wives — and a scene of soldiers sleeping by the coffin. The tomb is crowned by figures of the Resurrected Christ and angels on the arch of the pediment. These upper figures belong to the chisel of Sebastiano Sala and are marked by the fineness of modeling. The three central reliefs are professionally weaker and were likely executed by other masters.

The character of the Renaissance tomb changes here. Baroque expression is felt in the composition, manifested in the richness of color shades, the complexity and tension of the tomb's silhouette, and in the broken arch of the pediment, which contains figures of angels that are clearly disproportionate to it.

== See also ==
- Sapieha family
- Tomb of Paweł Stefan Sapieha and his wives

== Literature ==
- Лявонава, А. К. (1991). Старажытнабеларуская скульптура [Ancient Belarusian Sculpture] (in Belarusian). Мінск: Навука і тэхніка. ISBN 5-343-00155-6.
