= Lew Sapieha =

Polish–Lithuanian nobleman (1557–1633)

- Grand Chancellor of Lithuania; Grand Hetman of Lithuania
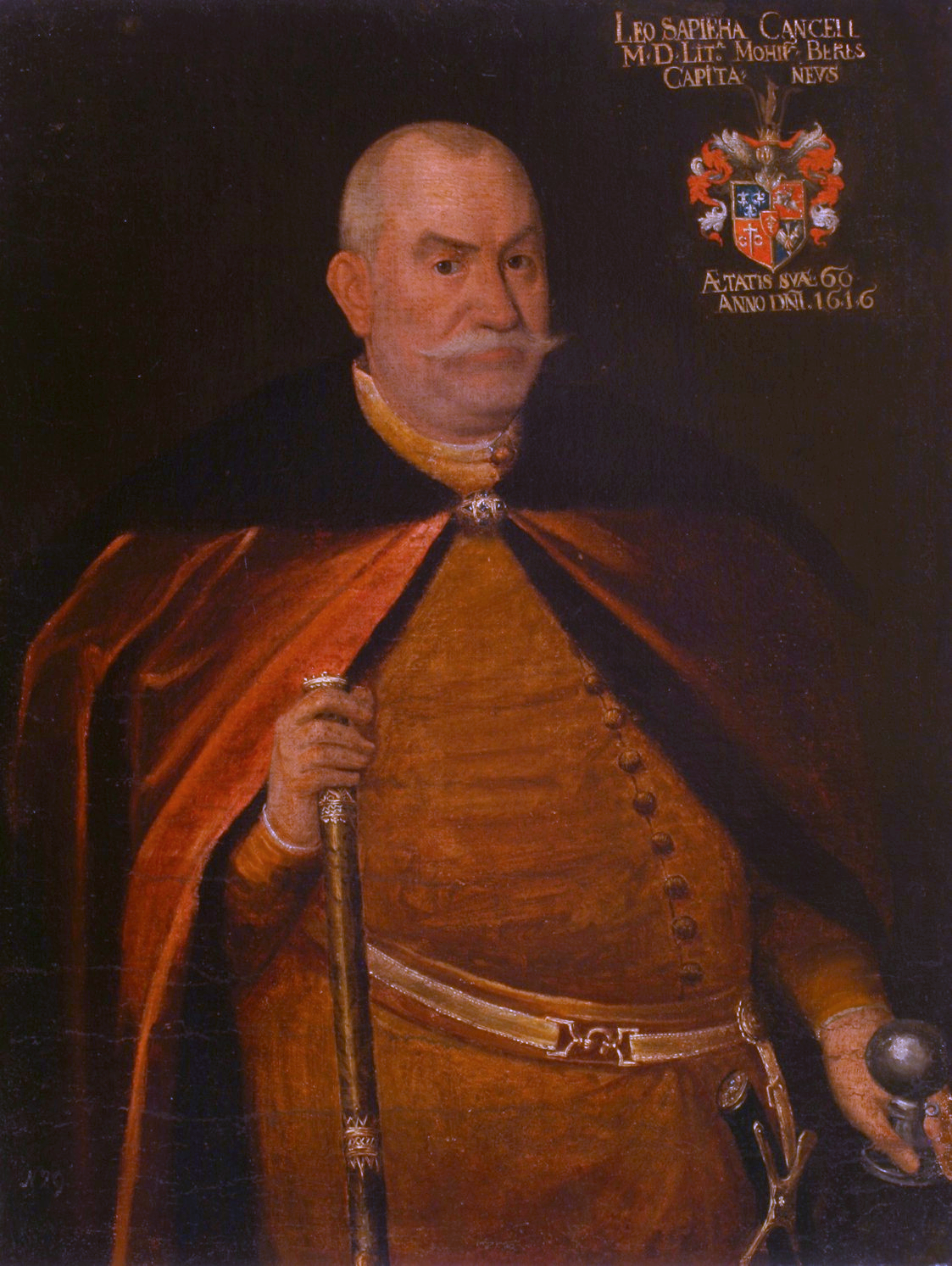
- Coat of arms: Lis
- Born: 4 April 1557 near Vitebsk, Grand Duchy of Lithuania (now Belarus)
- Died: 7 July 1633 (aged 76); Vilnius, Polish–Lithuanian Commonwealth (now Lithuania)
- Noble family: Sapieha
- Spouses: Dorota Firlej; Halaszka Radziwiłł
- Issue: with Dorota Firlej; Katarzyna Sapieha; Krzysztof Sapieha; Jan Stanisław Sapieha; Andrzej Sapieha with Halaszka Radziwiłł; Anna Sapieha; Krzysztof Michał Sapieha; Kazimierz Leon Sapieha
- Father: Iwan Sapieha
- Mother: Bohdana Drucka Konopka

Lew Sapieha (Ruthenian: Левъ Сапега; Belarusian: Леў Сапега; 4 April 1557 – 7 July 1633) was a nobleman and statesman of the Polish–Lithuanian Commonwealth. He held the offices of Grand Lithuanian Secretary (1580), Grand Lithuanian Scribe (1581), Lithuanian Vice-Chancellor (1585), Grand Chancellor of Lithuania (1589–1623), Voivode of Vilnius (1621), Great Lithuanian Hetman (1623), and starosta of Slonim, Brest and Mogilev.

Sapieha is considered as a great political figure of the Commonwealth. A rich and powerful magnate, he was known for his wisdom as a statesman, lawyer and military commander, he was one of the greatest leaders of the Grand Duchy of Lithuania at the times of the Duchy's highest cultural flourishing. He was of Ruthenian (Belarusian) ethnicity. Modern Belarusian sources interpret his Ruthenian heritage as Belarusian.

== Early life ==
He was born in Astroŭna (Belarusian: Астроўна), near Vitebsk. He was educated in Leipzig University from 1570-1573 and worked in the royal chancellery of King of Poland and Grand Duke of Lithuania Stephen Báthory under the direction of Jan Zamoyski.

Raised Eastern Orthodox, in his youth he converted to Calvinism and founded a number of Calvinist churches in his former estates. In the 1570s, he turned to Unitarianism. Disillusioned by the squabbles within the Protestant camp, in 1586 he converted with his first wife to Roman Catholicism of which he became a zealous defender. After the Union of Brest he enforced conformity on the unwilling Eastern Orthodox.

== Career and politics ==
He supported a political union with Muscovy in 1584–1600 and led the diplomatic mission to Moscow in 1600 that proposed the union to tzar Boris Godunov, who declined the proposal. He also participated in wars with Muscovy under rule of Stephen Báthory and King of Poland and Grand Duke of Lithuania Sigismund III Vasa. He became an adviser of Sigismund III and supported his radical plans to take over the Muscovite throne and reclaim Smolensk by force. He participated in establishing the Lithuanian Tribunal in 1578.

As Chancellor he was the main editor and publisher of the last version of the Statute of the Grand Duchy of Lithuania. He laid grounds for the establishment of the Law Faculty in the University of Vilnius, which was created in 1641. He was co-initiator and a participant in the military expedition to Moscow in 1618 by King of Poland and Grand Duke of Lithuania Władysław IV.

As Sejm Marshal, he led the ordinary Sejm in Warsaw from 4 October to 25 November 1582. He was a benefactor of many catholic churches in the Grand Duchy. He established the long-term power and wealth of the Sapieha family.

Sapieha died on 1633 and was interred in the cellars of the Church of St. Michael the Archangel in Vilnius, which he himself commissioned. His tomb remains there to the present day and is still the largest piece of art of its kind in the territory of Lithuania.

== Gallery ==
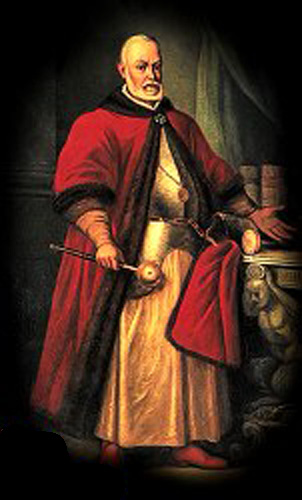
Portrait depicting Sapieha by an unknown painter

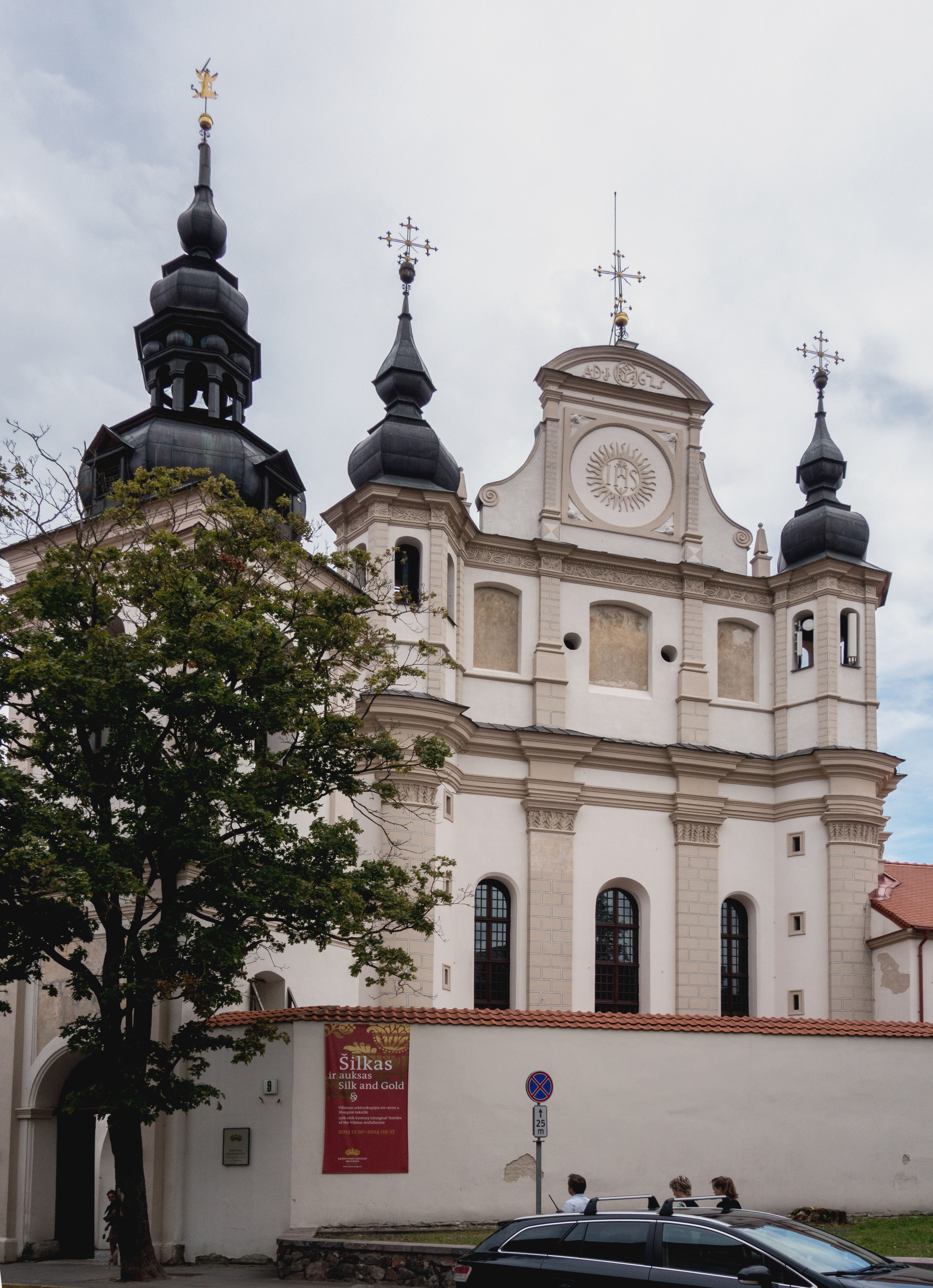
St. Michael's Church in Vilnius (1594), commissioned by Sapieha as a personal mausoleum

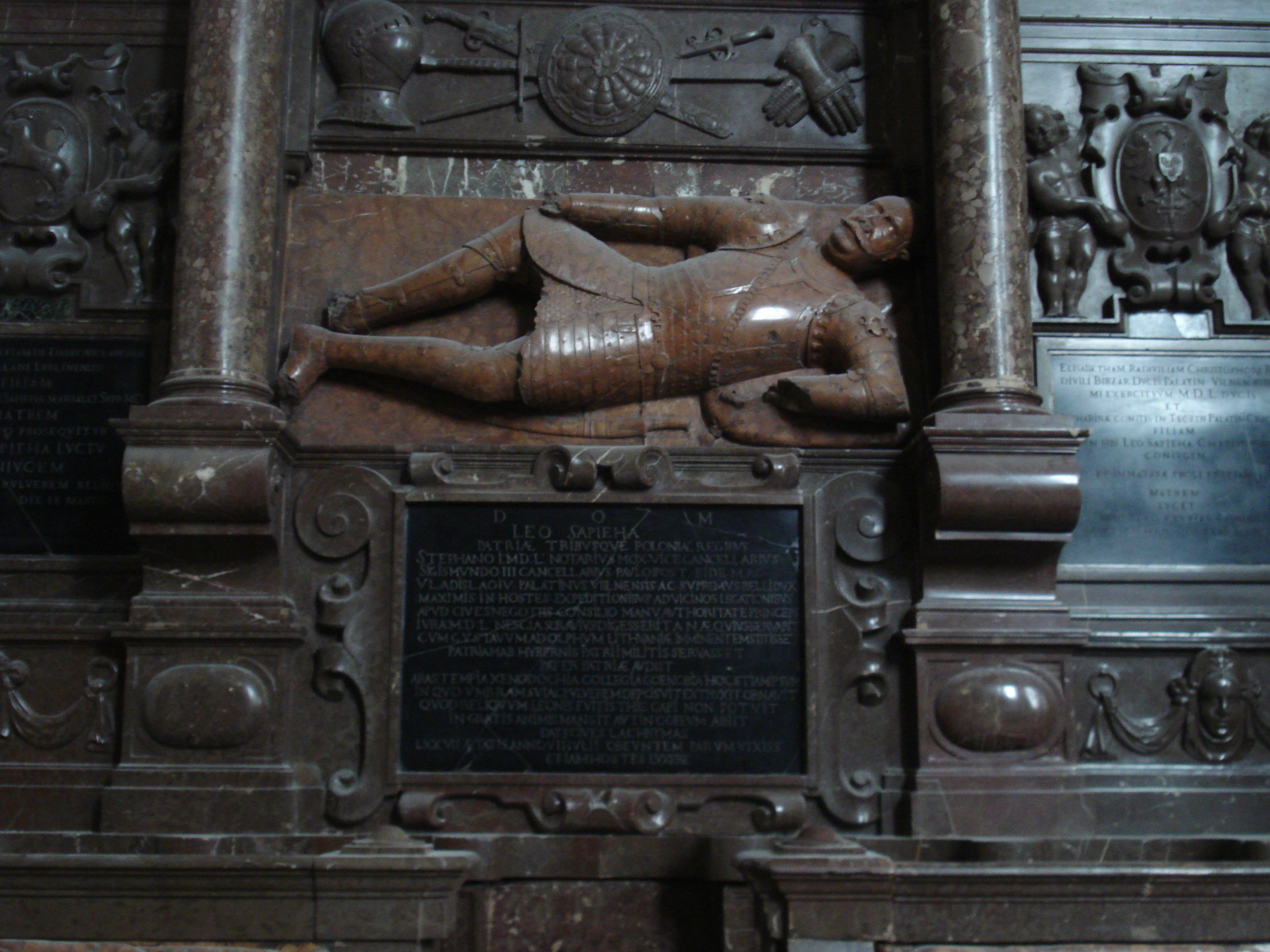
Tomb of Lew Sapieha inside the church

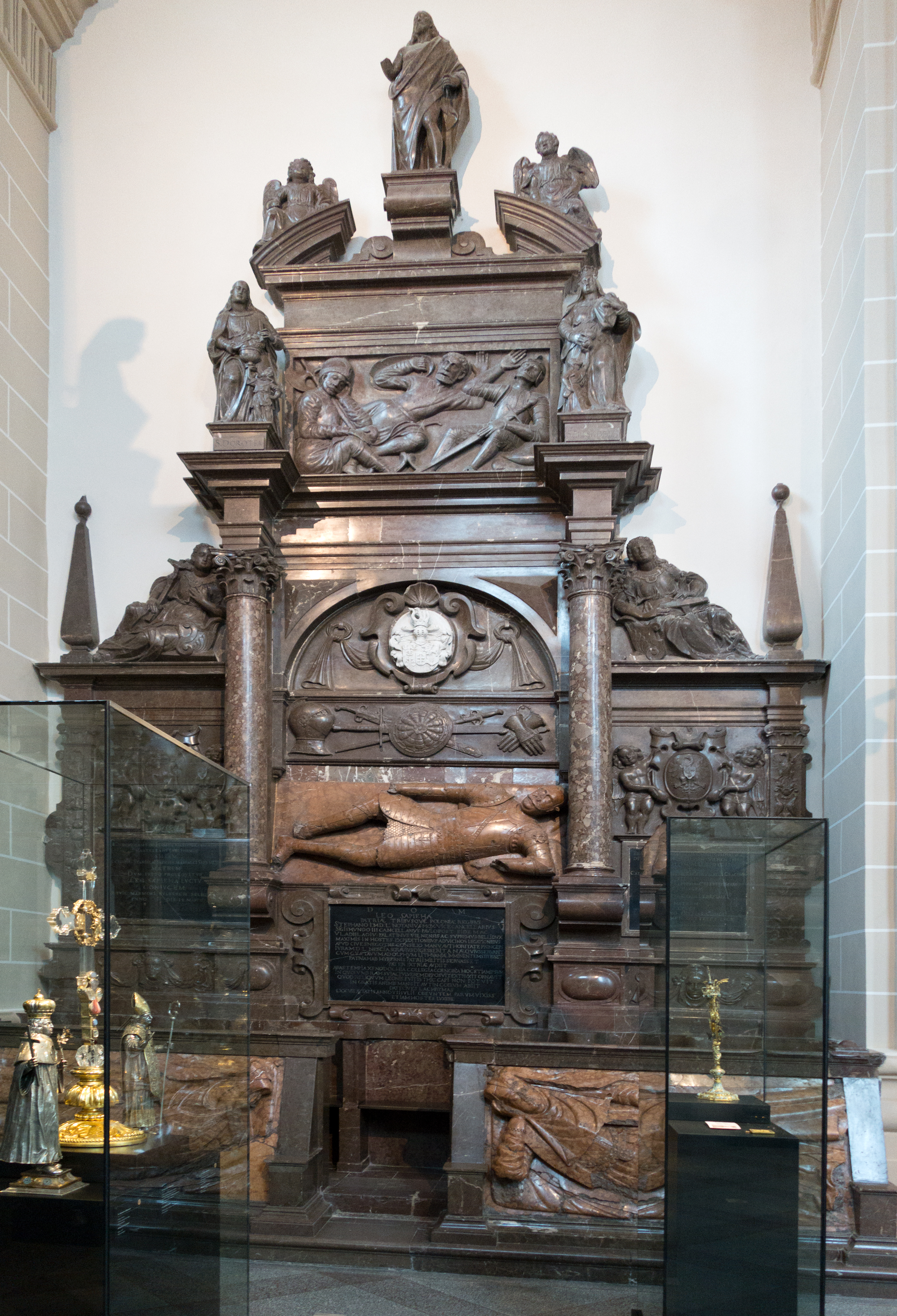
Lew Sapieha is buried with his two wives

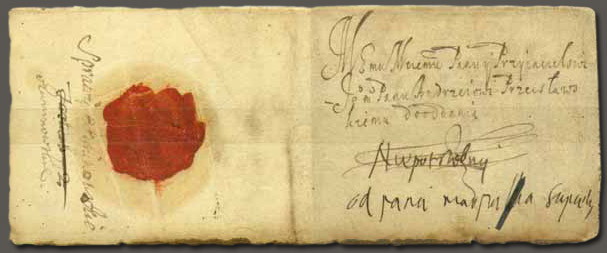
A letter signed by Sapieha from 1626

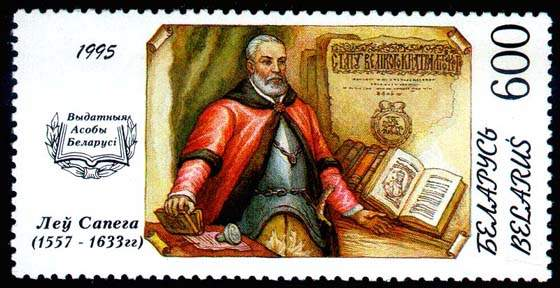
Belarusian stamp from 1995

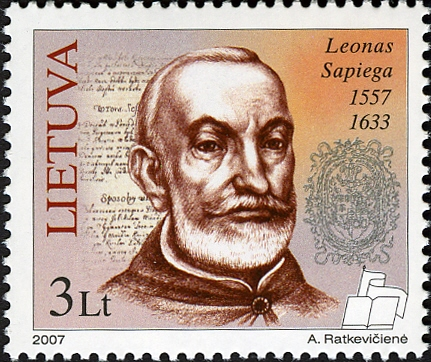
Lithuanian stamp from 2007
