= Church of St. Michael, Vilnius =

Church in Vilnius, Lithuania

Church of St. Michael the Archangel
- Šv. Mykolo bažnyčia
- Main façade of St Michael's

Religion
- Affiliation: Roman Catholic
- Diocese: Old Town

Location
- Location: Vilnius, Lithuania
- Interactive map of Church of St. Michael the Archangel
- Coordinates: 54.6828°N 25.2922°E

Architecture
- Architects: Giovanni Battista Gisleni, Zigmuntas Hendelis, Wacław Michniewicz
- Type: Church
- Style: Baroque, Gothic, Renaissance
- Completed: 1594
- Materials: plastered masonry

UNESCO World Heritage Site
- Official name: Vilnius Old Town
- Type: Cultural
- Criteria: Cultural: (ii), (iv)
- Designated: 1994
- Reference no.: 541
- UNESCO region: Europe

St Michael's Church or St. Michael the Archangel Church (Lithuanian: Šv. Mykolo bažnyčia) is a former Roman Catholic church in Vilnius' Old Town, on the right bank of the Vilnia River. It now hosts the Church Heritage Museum.

== History ==
In 1594-97 the church was commissioned by the Chancellor of the Grand Duchy of Lithuania Lew Sapieha as a mausoleum for his family. The construction was finished in ca. 1604, but in 1627 the roofing fell in; later stonemason Jonas Kajetka rebuilt it. During the 1655-61 war with Moscow the Cossacks burned down and ravaged the church; it was renovated in 1663-73. A Baroque belfry was built in the 1st quarter of the 18th century. The church was closed down by the tsarist authorities in 1888, and in 1905 returned to Sapiehas, renovated in 1905-12. In 1933 both the church and monastery were renovated again (under supervision by Stanislaw Lorentz). In 1972-2006 the Museum of Architecture operated in the church. Church Heritage Museum was established in 2009 at the church. Museum presents and exhibits the oldest sacral valuables. In the centre of the exposition is treasury of Vilnius Cathedral. Lectures, concerts, book presentations are held in the Museum. Educational programmes for children and adults introduce the history of Lithuanian Church, sacral art and architecture.

== Architecture ==
The harmonious whitewashed façade of St. Michael is built in a transitional style from Renaissance into Baroque; there are twin towers with elegant Baroque spires on both sides. The façade is divided by pilasters with original capitals decorated with floral motifs; the pediment has a frieze, also with floral motifs. Atop the belfry sits an iron weathervane (18th century) representing Saint Michael the Archangel crushing the devil underfoot.

The interior is rich but austere. It is a single-nave space with tunnel vaults (in a pattern of stars, hearts and rosettes). The high altar is of the late Renaissance style (first half of the 17th century), made of black, red, brown, dark green marble, decorated with white alabaster; side altars are rococo (18th century).
