= Church of St. Francis and St. Bernardino, Vilnius =

Roman Catholic church in Vilnius, Lithuania

Church of St. Francis and St. Bernardino
- Šv. Pranciškaus ir Šv. Bernardino bažnyčia
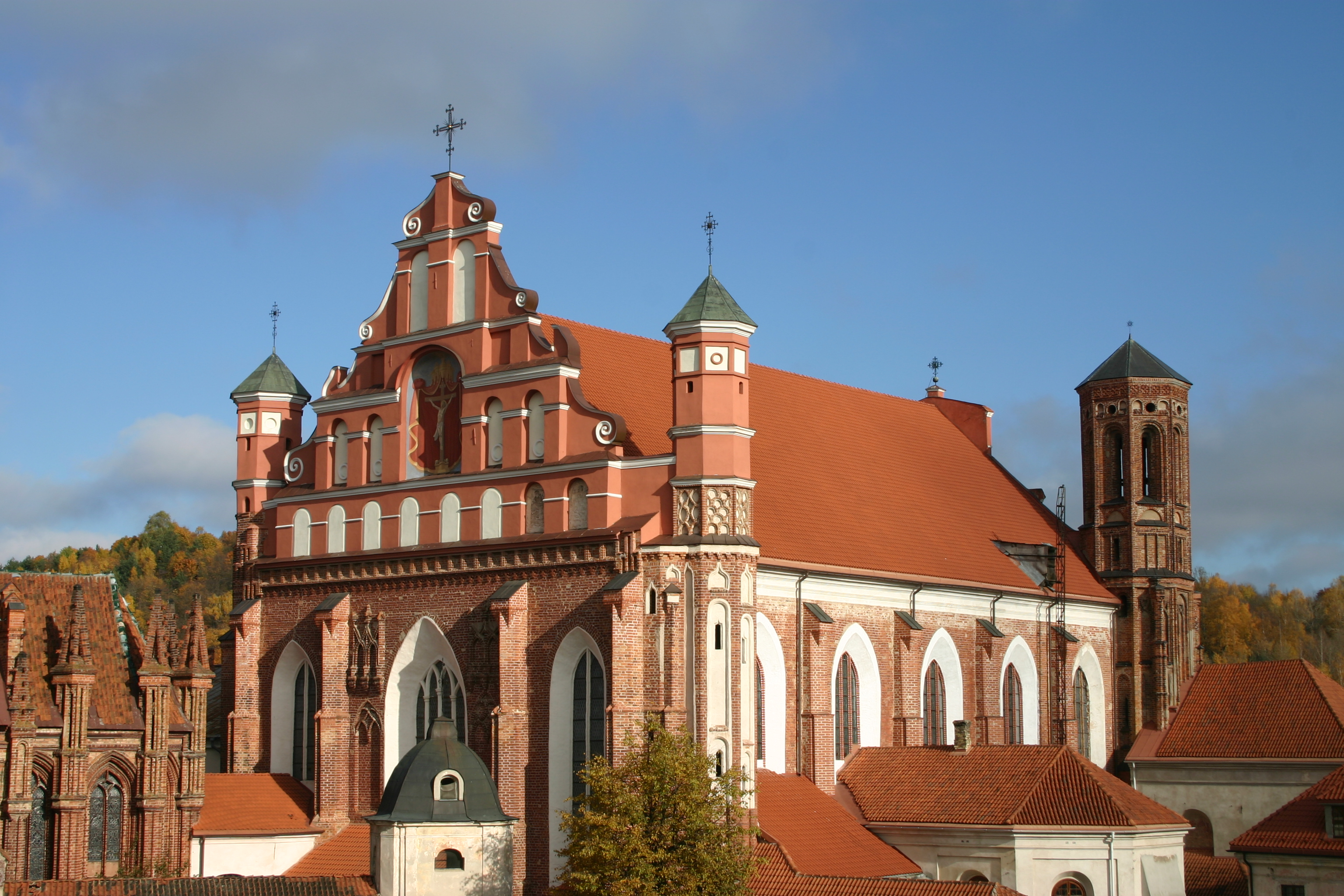
- General view of the front façade

Religion
- Affiliation: Roman Catholic
- Diocese: Old Town
- Year consecrated: 1516

Location
- Location: Vilnius, Lithuania
- Interactive map of Church of St. Francis and St. Bernardino
- Coordinates: 54°40′59″N 25°17′38″E

Architecture
- Architect: Michael Enkinger?
- Type: Church
- Style: Late Gothic and Brick Gothic

Specifications
- Direction of façade: West
- Materials: clay bricks

Website
- parapija.bernardinai.lt

UNESCO World Heritage Site
- Official name: Vilnius Old Town
- Type: Cultural
- Criteria: Cultural: (ii), (iv)
- Designated: 1994
- Reference no.: 541
- UNESCO region: Europe

The Church of St. Francis and St. Bernardino (Lithuanian: Šv. Pranciškaus ir Šv. Bernardino bažnyčia; also known as Bernardine Church; Lithuanian: Bernardinų bažnyčia) is a Roman Catholic church in the Old Town of Vilnius, Lithuania. It is located next to St. Anne's Church. Dedicated to Saints Francis of Assisi and Bernardino of Siena, it is an important example of Gothic architecture in Lithuania.

== History ==
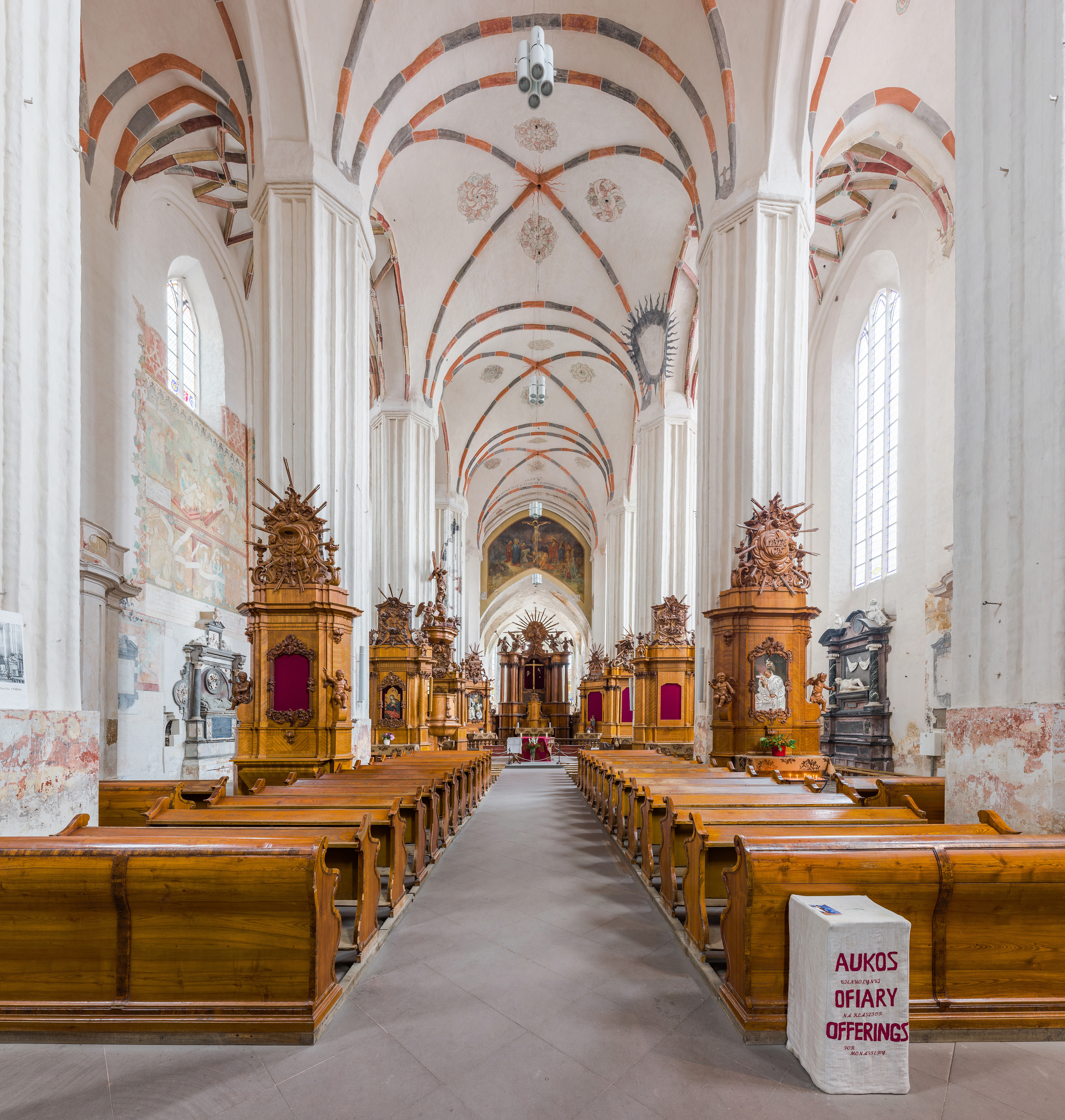
Interior

After their arrival in Vilnius, Bernardine monks built a wooden church in the second half of the 15th century, and at the end of the same century - a brick one. In the early 16th century it was reconstructed, apparently with the participation of a master from Gdansk (Danzig) Michael Enkinger. In the beginning of the 16th century the church was incorporated into the construction of Vilnius defensive wall, so there are shooting openings in its walls. Afterwards it was renewed many times, particularly after the 1655-61 war with Moscow, when the Cossacks ravaged the church killing the monks and citizens who had taken shelter there. In the times of the Soviet occupation it was closed down and handed over to the Art institute. In 1994, the brethren of St. Francis returned to the church. According to the legend, the Bernardine monks used to tell such good sermons that crowds would come to listen. That is why the church is so large.

== Architecture ==
Church and Monastery are some of the largest sacral buildings in Vilnius, although in the 17th and 18th centuries they acquired the Renaissance and Baroque features. Being much larger and more archaic than the St. Anne's Church, it forms and interesting and unique ensemble with the latter. Gothic pointed-arch windows and buttresses stand out on the façade. Above them rises a pediment with twin octagonal towers on the sides and a fresco depicting the Crucifix in the middle niche. A Gothic presbytery is the oldest part of the church. Eight high pillars divide the church interior into 3 naves. There are many valuable 16th-century wall paintings in Bernardine church and the oldest known artistic Lithuanian crucifix sculpture from the 15th century. The walls of the naves are decorated with Gothic polychrome frescoes, partly uncovered in 1981 - dynamic, colourful figural compositions on biblical and hagiographic themes, with occasional inscriptions in Gothic characters, floral ornaments, heraldic insignia etc. These mural paintings date from the early 16th century and are considered unique in the world: their composition and type of presentation of the subject matter belongs to Renaissance, and the stylistics - to the Gothic style. The Bernardine monastery north of the church, built simultaneously with the church, was renovated and reconstructed several times. Since its founding, a novitiate and a seminary operated at the monastery, a rich library had been accumulated, and a scriptorium operated. There artists, craftsmen and organists among the monks. The monastery was closed in 1864, and the building housed soldiers' barracks. In 1919 it was given to the art faculty of the university, later - to the Art Institute (now the Art Academy).
