= Marcinkonys Eldership =

Marcinkonys Eldership Marcinkonių seniūnija
- Eldership
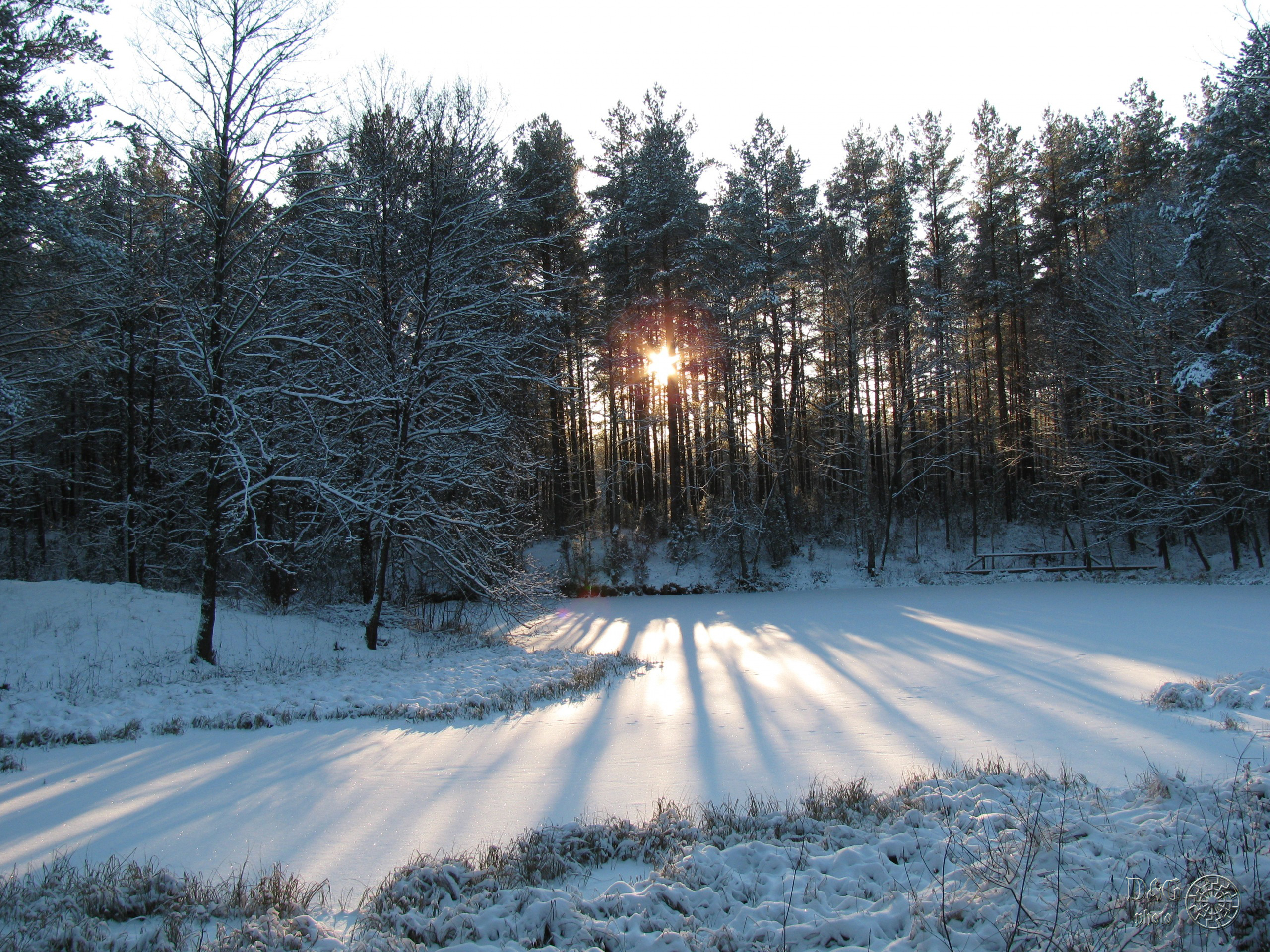
- Marcinkonys area during winter

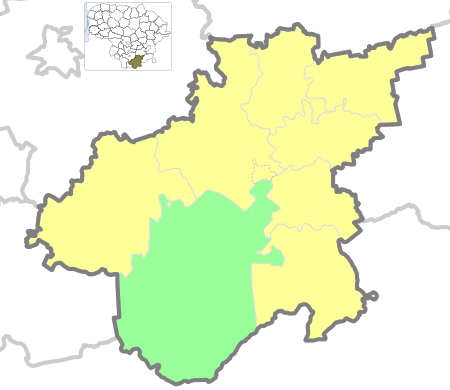
- Location of Marcinkonys Eldership
- Country: Lithuania
- Ethnographic region: Dzūkija
- County: Alytus County
- Municipality: Varėna District Municipality
- Administrative centre: Marcinkonys

Area
  - Total: 565 km^{2} (218 sq mi)

Population (2021)
  - Total: 960
  - Density: 1.7/km^{2} (4.4/sq mi)
- Time zone: UTC+2 (EET)
  - Summer (DST): UTC+3 (EEST)
- Website: varena.lt/seniunijos/marcinkoniu-seniunija/

Marcinkonys Eldership (Lithuanian: Marcinkonių seniūnija) is a Lithuanian eldership, located in the south western part of Varėna District Municipality.

== Geography ==
Marcinkonys Eldership is mostly covered by the Dainava Forest and it is the second most sparsely populated and largest eldership in Lithuania (by area comparable to Kazlų Rūda Municipality). It is in the Dainava Plain, undulated with massifs of continental dunes. The Čepkeliai Marsh is located at its southern part. Most of the eldership is inside the Dzūkija National Park.

- Rivers: Merkys, Ūla, Grūda, Skroblus.
- Lakes and ponds: Lavysas, Grūda Lake, Kastinis, Trikampis.
- Marshes: Čepkeliai Marsh
- Forests: Dainava Forest.
- Protected areas: Dzūkija National Park, Čepkeliai Nature Reserve.

== Places of interest ==
- Wooden Catholic churches in Marcinkonys and Kabeliai villages
- Dzūkian Etnographical Museum in Marcinkonys
- Dzūkian Traditional Beekeeping Museum in Musteika
- Etnographical villages of Musteika, Margionys, Dubininkas, Zervynos, Mardasavas.
- Gražina Didelytė gallery "Andeinė" in Rudnia.
- Folk theater in Margionys.
- Old beekeeping hollows in pine trees (dravės).
- 'Lietuvio' lime tree in Margionys.
- Skroblus river source "Woman's Garden" (Bobos Daržas) in Margionys.
- Ūla river cliffs between Zervynos and Mančiagirė.
- The source "Ūla Eye" (Ūlos akis) nearby Mančiagirė.

== Populated places ==
Following settlements are located in the Marcinkonys Eldership (as for the 2021 census):

Locality	Status	Total	Male	Female
Ašašninkai	K	27	12	15
Darželiai	K	39	17	22
Daržinėlės	K	19	11	8
Dubas	K	7	4	3
Dubininkas	K	4	-	-
Grybaulia	K	15	7	8
Kabeliai	K	122	56	66
Kapiniškiai	K	16	8	8
Kašėtos	K	7	-	-
Lavysas	K	5	-	-
Mančiagirė	K	9	6	3
Marcinkonys	K	493	235	258
Mardasavas	K	31	17	14
Margionys	K	39	21	18
Musteika	K	36	18	18
Paūliai	K	3	-	-
Puvočiai	K	50	23	27
Senovė	K	4	-	-
Šklėriai	K	30	17	13
Trakiškiai	K	6	-	-
Zervynos	K	36	14	22
Žiūrai	K	18	7	11
