= Mardasavas =

Mardasavas may refer to:

- Mardasavas (Marcinkonys), a village in Marcinkonys eldership, Varėna district municipality, Alytus County, Lithuania
- Mardasavas (Merkinė), a village in Merkinė eldership, Varėna district municipality, Alytus County, Lithuania
