= Ašašninkai =

- Village
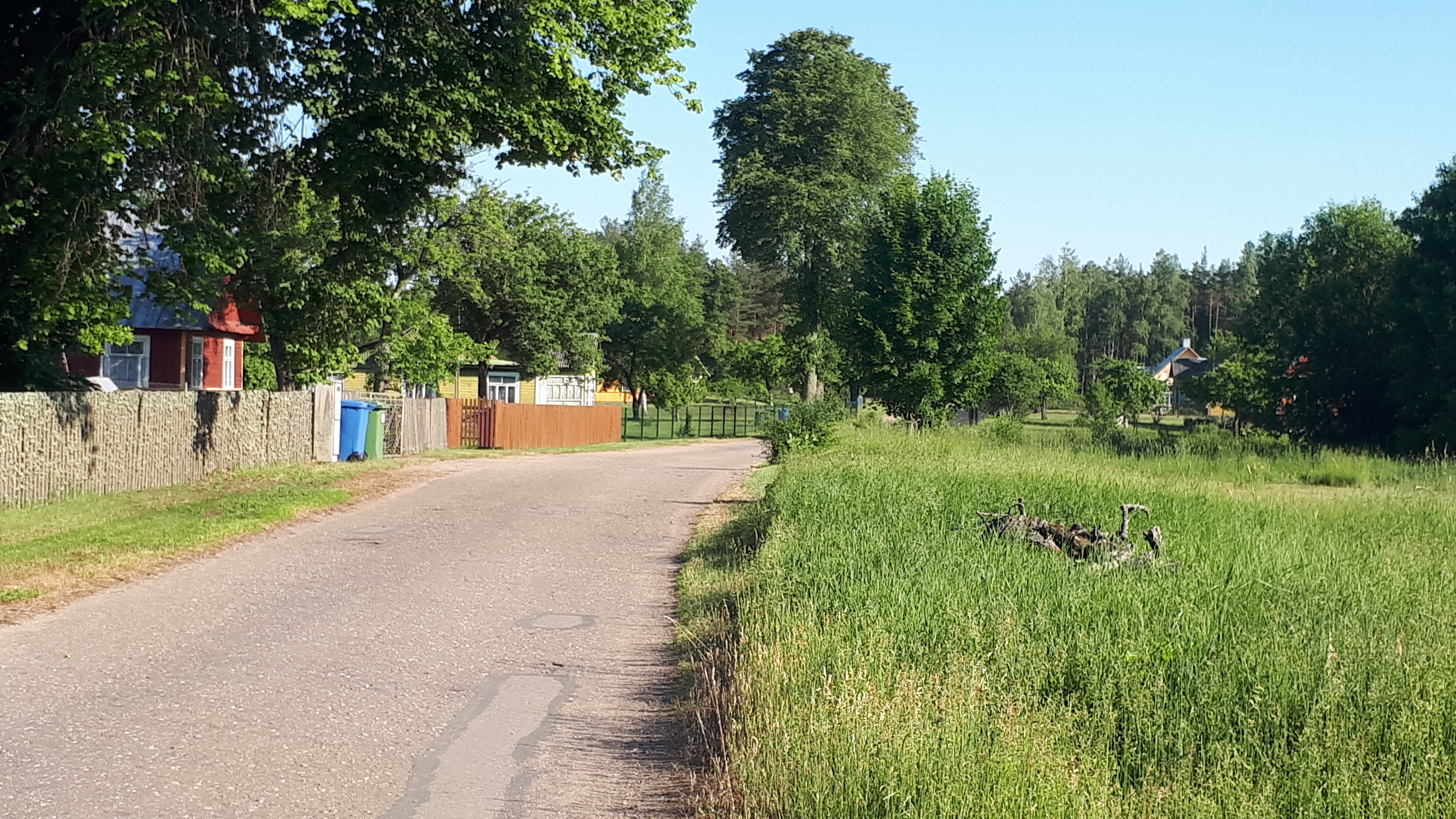
- Ašašninkai, Žirmūnų street

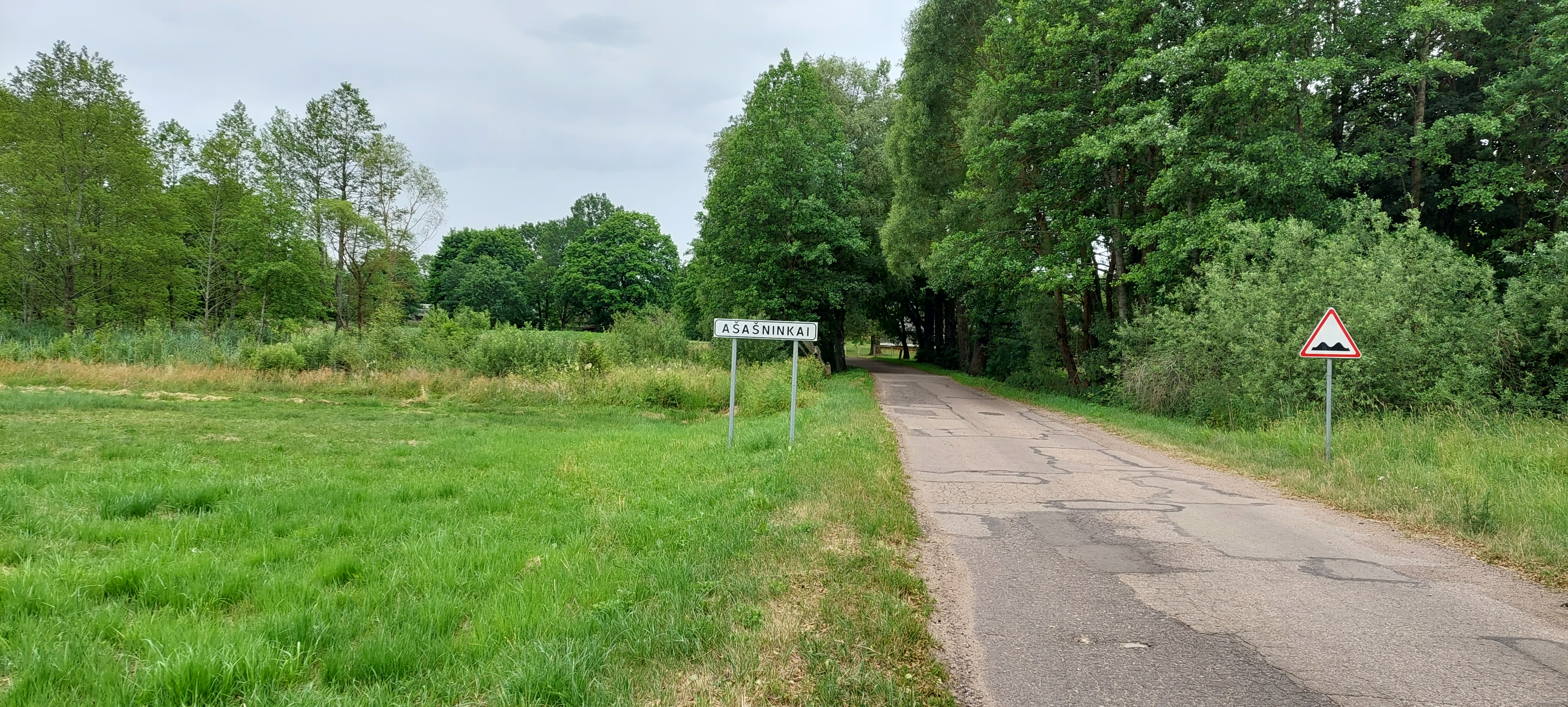
- Ašašninkai
- Interactive map of Ašašninkai
- Location in Lithuania
- Coordinates: 53°56′10″N 24°18′10″E
- Country: Lithuania
- Ethnographic region: Dzūkija
- County: Alytus County
- Municipality: Varėna district municipality
- Elderships: Marcinkonys eldership

Population (2021)
  - Total: 27
- Time zone: UTC+2 (EET)
  - Summer (DST): UTC+3 (EEST)

Ašašninkai is a village in Varėna district municipality, in Alytus County, in southeastern Lithuania. According to the 2021 census, the village has a population of 27 people. In the years 1921-1945 the village was within the borders of Poland. Ašašninkai is the southernmost inhabited place is Lithuania.

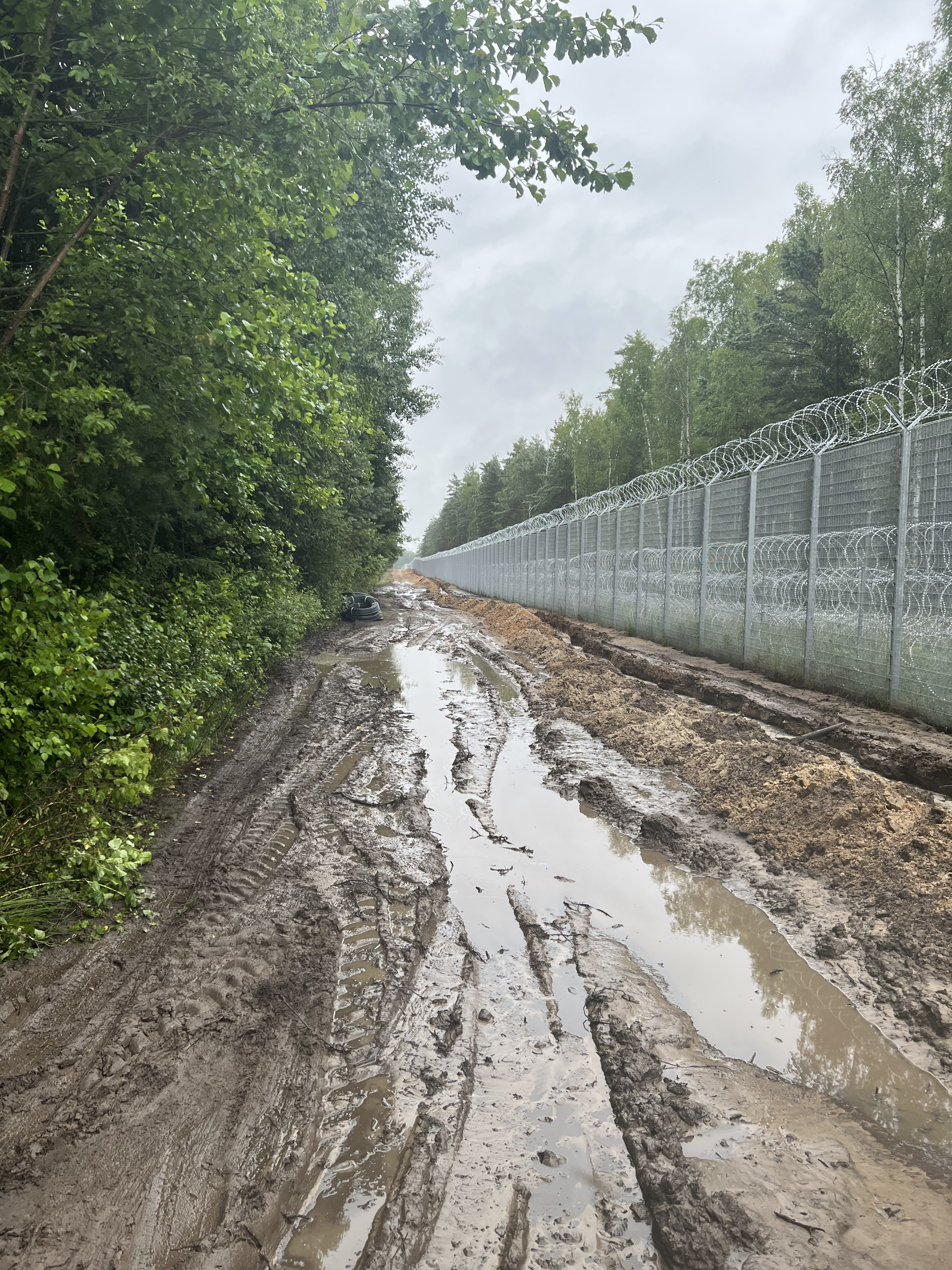
Barrier between Lithuania and Belarus near Ašašninkai village

Ašašninkai village is located c. 25 kilometres (16 mi) from Druskininkai, 19 kilometres (12 mi) from Marcinkonys, 1 kilometre (0.62 mi) from Kabeliai (the nearest settlement) and 1 kilometre (0.62 mi) from the Belarusian border.

== Demographics ==
Historical population

Year	Pop.	±%
1959	289	—
1979	185	−36.0%
1989	108	−41.6%

Year	Pop.	±%
2001	75	−30.6%
2011	43	−42.7%
2021	27	−37.2%

Source: 1959, 1979, 1989, 2001, 2011

== Etymology ==
The name Ašašninkai (in Dzūkian Ašašnykai) comes from Lithuanian: ašašnykas < Belarusian: асочнік, Russian: осочник which mean 'a hunter beater, a forest ranger, a forest keeper, a tracker'. Before 1990 the village was officially called Kabeliai II.
