= Dubas =

Dubas may refer to:

- Dubas, Marcinkonys, a village in Varėna District Municipality, Lithuania
- British Dubas (1936–late 1950s), Kenyan police maintained by the British colonial government; see Dubat § British Dubas

== People with the surname ==
- Annette Dubas (born 1956), American politician
- Jonathan Dubas (born 1991), Swiss basketball player
- Kyle Dubas (born 1985), Canadian ice hockey executive
- Marie Dubas (1894–1972), French singer

== See also ==
- Dupas (disambiguation)
