= Paūliai =

- Village
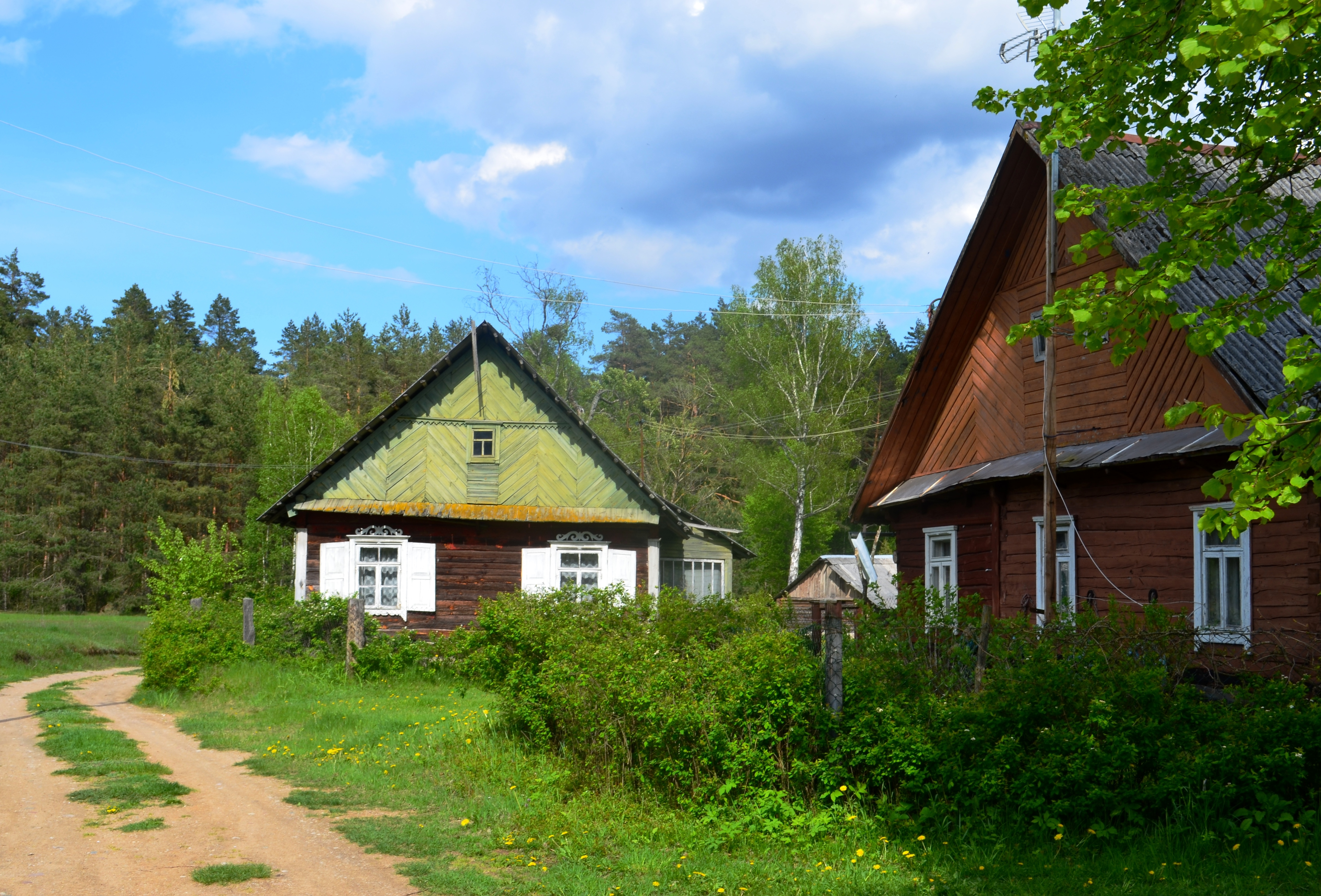

- Location in Lithuania
- Coordinates: 54°09′37″N 24°21′21″E
- Country: Lithuania
- County: Alytus County
- Municipality: Varėna District Municipality
- Elderships: Marcinkonys Eldership

Population (2021)
  - Total: 3
- Time zone: UTC+2 (EET)
  - Summer (DST): UTC+3 (EEST)

Paūliai is a village in Varėna District Municipality, Alytus County, in southeastern Lithuania. According to the 2021 census, the village had a population of 27 people. In 1921–1945, the village was within the borders of the Second Polish Republic.

Paūliai is located about 24 kilometres (15 mi) from Varėna, 22 kilometres (14 mi) from Marcinkonys, 4 kilometres (2.5 mi) from Lavysas (the nearest settlement).

== Etymology ==
The name Paūliai means 'a place by the Ūla River' in Lithuanian.
