= Kapiniškiai =

- Village
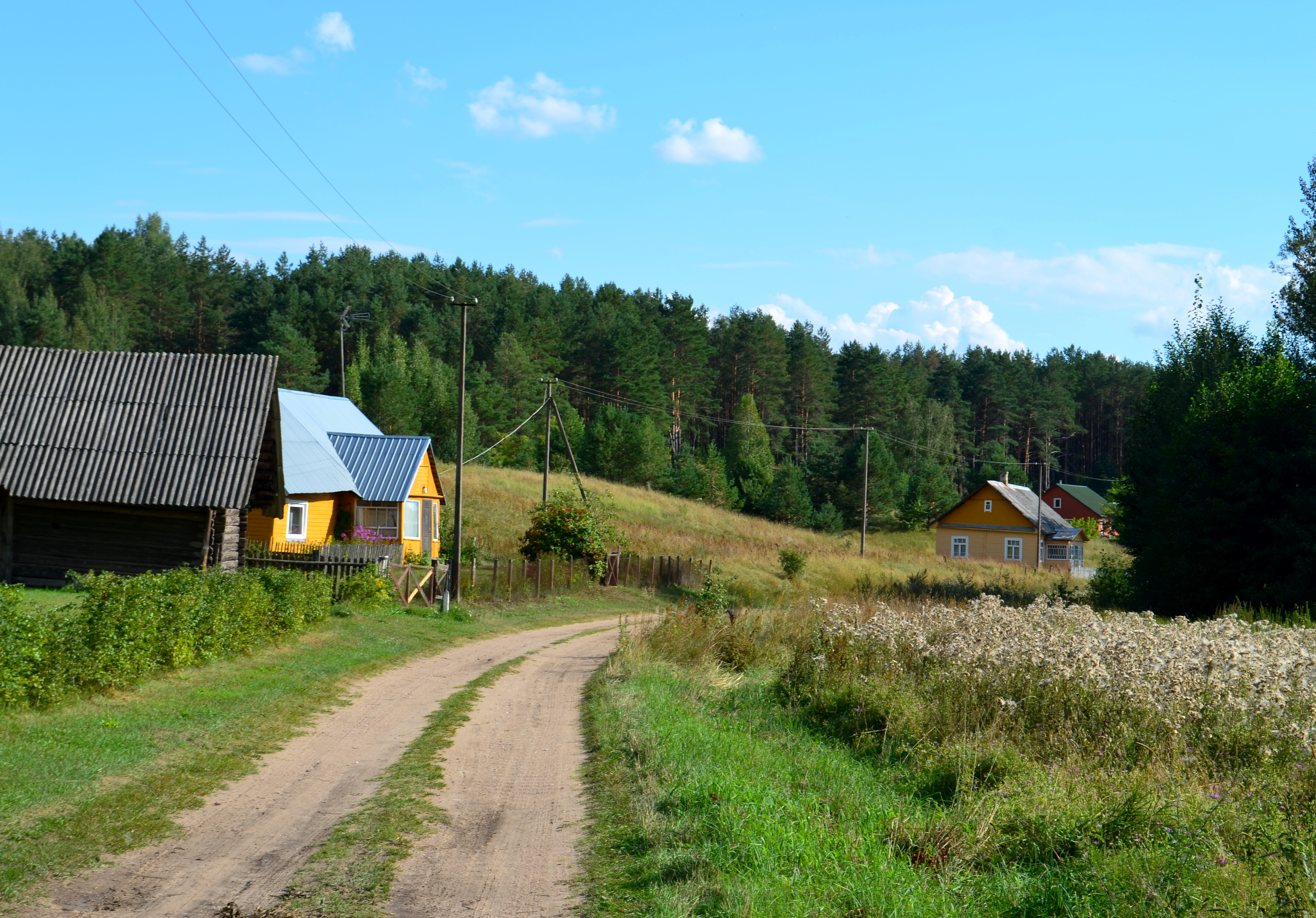

- Location of Kapiniškiai
- Coordinates: 54°02′01″N 24°17′33″E
- Country: Lithuania
- Ethnographic region: Dzūkija
- County: Alytus County
- Municipality: Varėna district municipality
- Eldership: Marcinkonys Eldership

Population (2021)
  - Total: 16
- Time zone: UTC+2 (EET)
  - Summer (DST): UTC+3 (EEST)

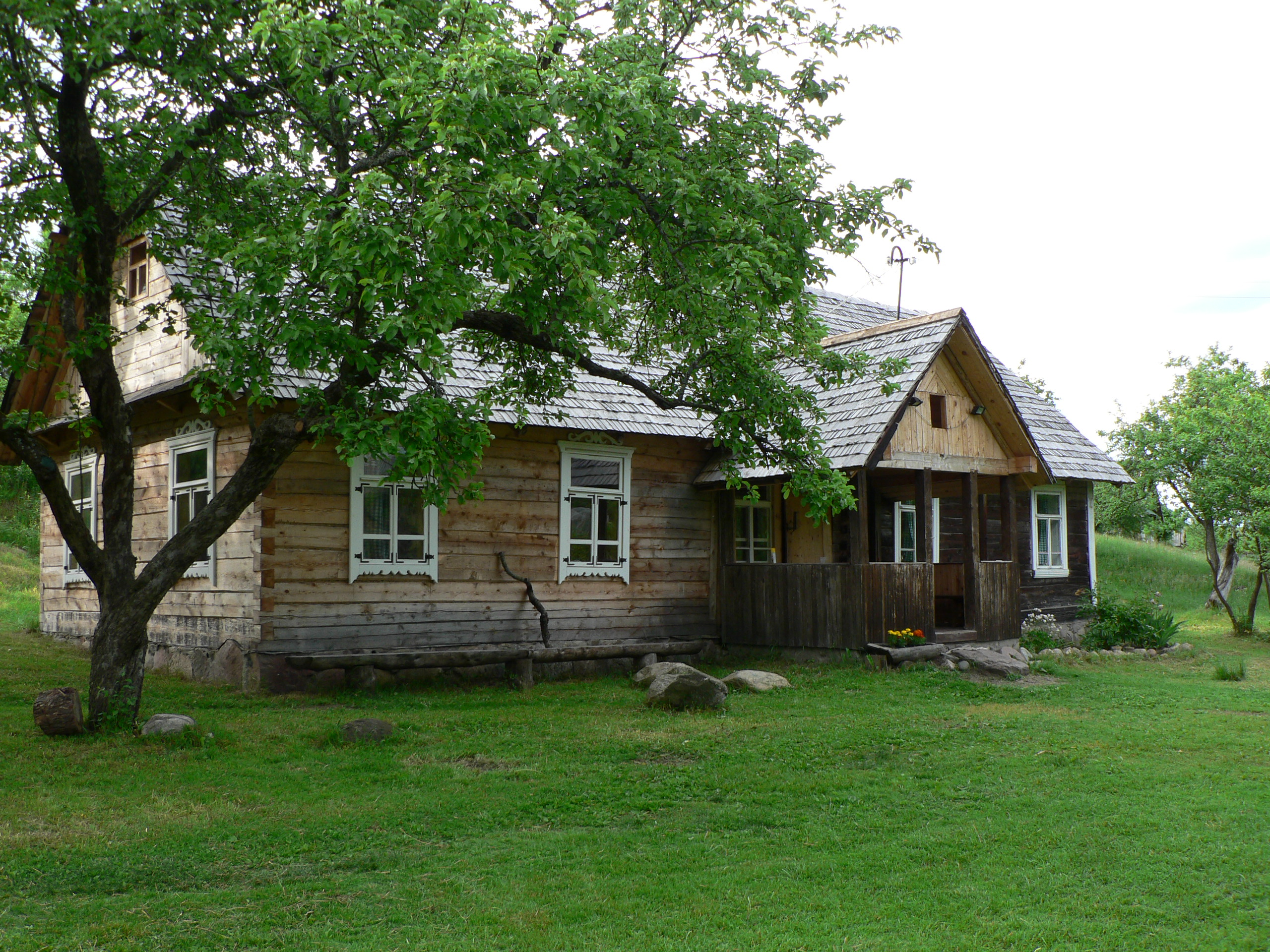
A wooden house in Kapiniškiai

Kapiniškiai is an ethnographic village in Lithuania. It is located in the Dzūkija National Park south-west of Marcinkonys. According to the 2001 census, it had 54 residents.

Kapiniškiai village is located c. 25 kilometres (16 mi) from Druskininkai, 10 kilometres (6.2 mi) from Marcinkonys, 2 kilometres (1.2 mi) from Margionys (the nearest settlement).

== Etymology ==
The name Kapiniškiai comes from words Lithuanian: kapai, kapinės 'a cemetery'. There is not only a cemetery but also ancient burial mounds around the village.
