= Lavysas (Varėna) =

- Village
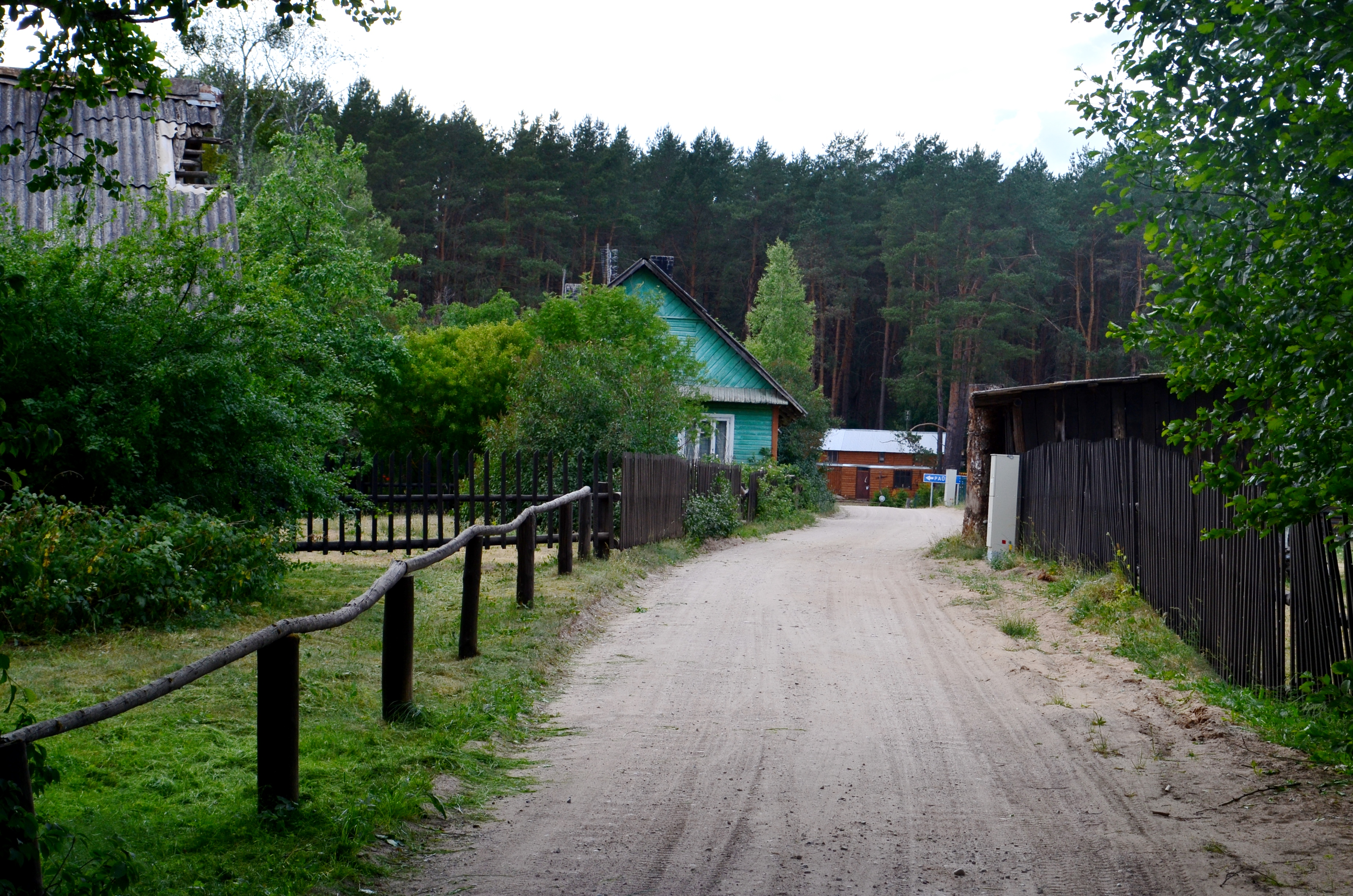

- Location in Lithuania
- Coordinates: 54°10′10″N 24°24′26″E
- Country: Lithuania
- County: Alytus County
- Municipality: Varėna District Municipality
- Elderships: Marcinkonys Eldership

Population (2021)
  - Total: 5
- Time zone: UTC+2 (EET)
  - Summer (DST): UTC+3 (EEST)

Lavysas is a village in Varėna District Municipality, Alytus County, in southeastern Lithuania. According to the 2021 census, the village had a population of 5 people. In 1921–1945, the village was within the borders of the Second Polish Republic.

Lavysas is located about 20 kilometres (12 mi) from Varėna, 18 kilometres (11 mi) from Marcinkonys, 3 kilometres (1.9 mi) from Žiūrai (the nearest settlement).

== Etymology ==
The name Lavysas comes from the name of the nearby Lavysas Lake.
