= Paronym =

Similar-sounding word with different meaning

Paronyms are near-homophones ("soundalike"), near-homographs ("lookalike") and/or near-cognates ("meanalike") — words that are similar but not identical in pronunciation, spelling, or lexical meaning — which may cause confusion in their understanding (reception) and usage (production). Paronymy is the relationship between a pair of words or phrases which are similar or partially identical in spelling, pronunciation and/or meaning.

In the discussion of semantic analysis, the term paronym can also be used in a narrower sense to refer to words that are derived from the same root, i.e. cognate words.

== Examples ==
=== English ===
Examples of English paronyms include:

- accept and except
- adapt and adept
- adore and adorn
- affect and effect
- alternately and alternatively
- altitude and attitude
- artful and artistic
- artist and artisan
- authoritative and authoritarian
- barely and barley
- beautiful and bountiful
- billion and bullion
- breath and breadth
- burrow and borough
- capable and culpable
- childish and childlike
- clause and claws
- cognitive and cognizant
- college and collage
- collision and collusion
- command and commend
- confident and confidant
- conjuncture and conjecture
- conservationism and conservatism
- contagious and contingent
- continuous and contiguous
- controller and comptroller
- coral and corral
- country and county
- death and dearth
- defection and defecation
- defiant and deviant
- deprecate and depreciate
- deprived and depraved
- desperate and disparate
- detergent and deterrent
- deviant and devious
- discord and discourse
- eclipse and ellipse
- exception and exemption
- excise and exercise
- express and espresso
- extent and extant
- fitness and finesse
- flail and fail
- flaunt and flout
- fright and fraught
- gauge and gouge
- graceful and gracious
- grump and gruff
- haven and heaven
- hawk and hock
- historical and hysterical
- illustrative and illustrious
- infection and inflection
- influence and affluence
- innocent and innocuous
- inspiration and aspiration
- kinks and kings
- lightning and lightening
- lovely and lovable
- massage and message
- motive and motif
- paronym and patronym
- plague and plaque
- popular and populous
- possible and plausible
- present and presence
- president and precedent
- proceed and precede
- profanity and profundity
- prolepsis and proslepsis
- quiet and quite
- recurring and re-occurring
- right and rite
- sensitive and sensible
- sentiment and sediment
- succeed and secede
- stupid and stupor
- telegraph and telegram
- temple and templar
- terrible and terrific
- terrify and terrorize
- trifle and truffle
- upmost and utmost
- willing and willful
- wreck and wreak

=== Spanish ===
Examples of Spanish paronyms include:

- dios ("god") and día ("day")

=== German ===
Examples of German paronyms include:

- Reise ("journey") and Riese ("giant")

== See also ==
- -onym
- Eggcorn
- Heteronym (linguistics)
- Paronymic attraction
- Word ladder
