= Žiūrai (Varėna) =

- Village
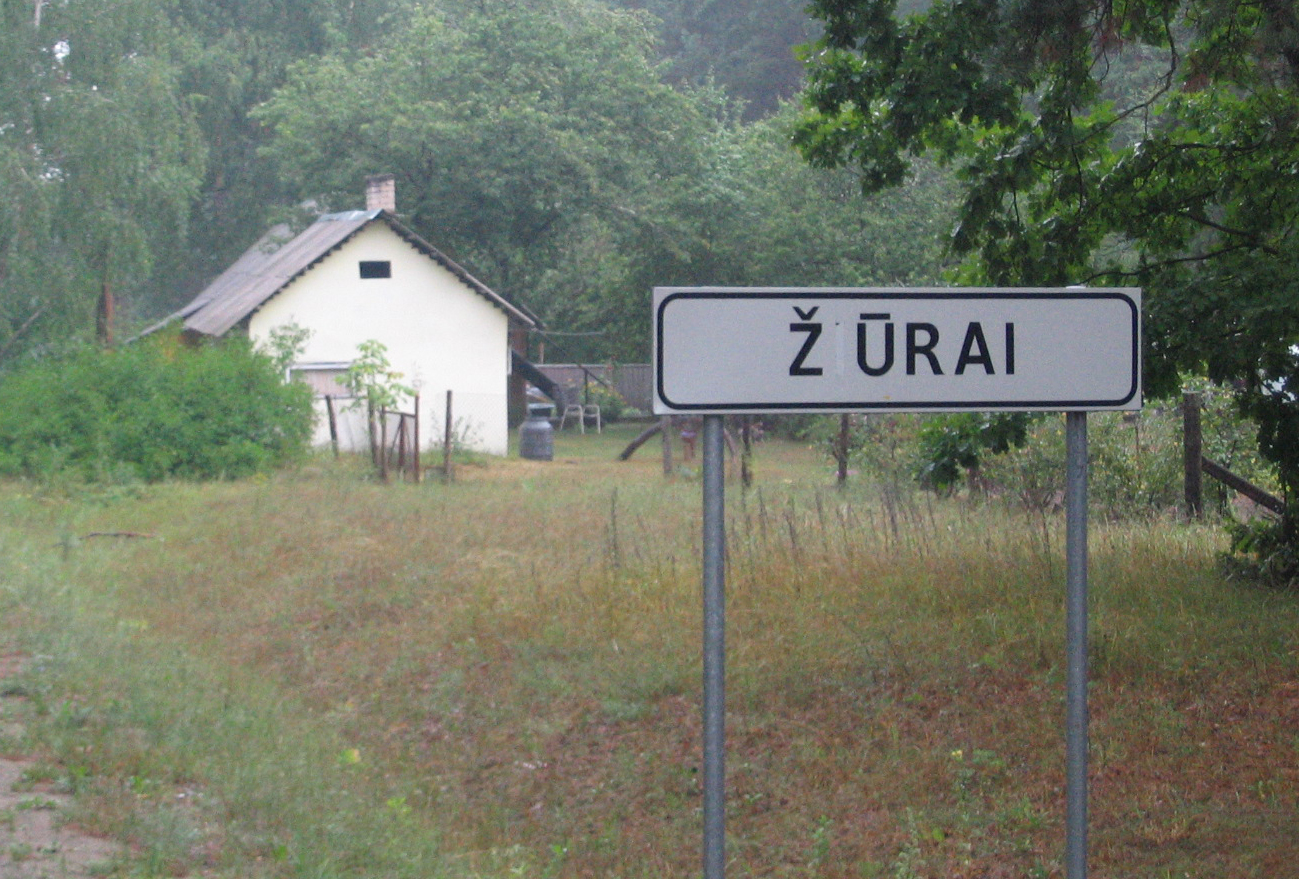

- Location in Lithuania
- Coordinates: 54°08′43″N 24°24′17″E
- Country: Lithuania
- County: Alytus County
- Municipality: Varėna district municipality
- Eldership: Marcinkonys eldership

Population (2021)
  - Total: 18
- Time zone: UTC+2 (EET)
  - Summer (DST): UTC+3 (EEST)

Žiūrai is a village in Varėna district municipality, in Alytus County, southeastern Lithuania. It is situated on Ūla River. According to the 2001 census, the village has a population of 35 people.

== Etymology ==
The name Žiūrai (in Dzūkian Žūrai, known as Polish: Żuraciszki, Russian: Журачишки in earlier written sources) may come from a personal names Žiūrỹs, Žiurà, Žiū̃ras but such aren't known in Southern Lithuania. Instead, there are popular personal names Žùras, Žuráulis, Žuraulià of Slavic origin (< Belarusian: Жуpавель from the same word meaning 'a crane').
