= Kotra (river) =

River in Belarus and Lithuania

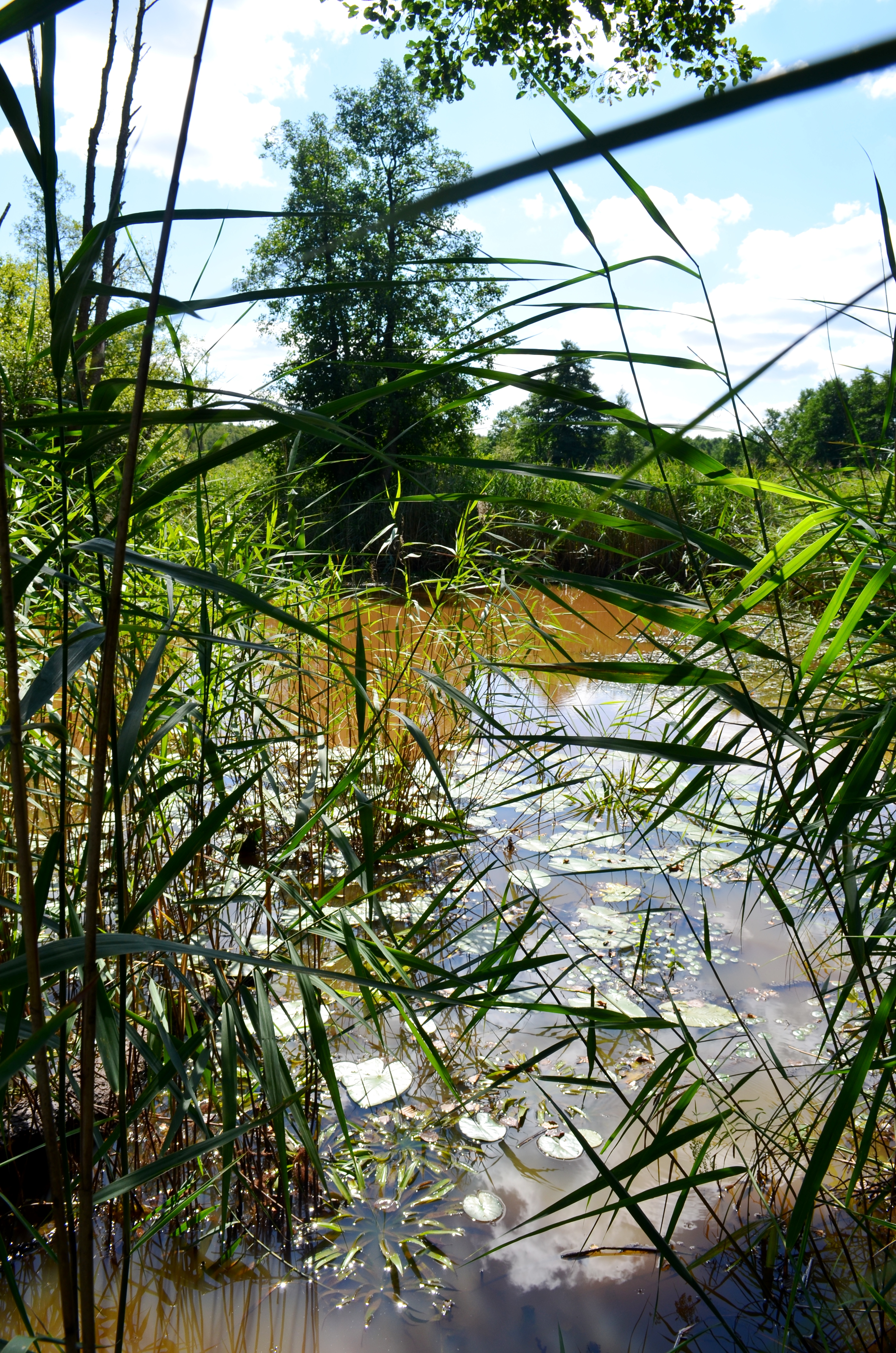
- Kotra River in Pogarenda (Belarus-Lithuania border)

Location
- Country: Belarus, Lithuania

Physical characteristics
- Source
  - location: 22 km southeast from Varėna
- Mouth: Neman
  - coordinates: 53°33′53″N 24°02′36″E
- Length: 109 km (68 mi)
- Basin size: 2,010 km^{2} (780 sq mi)
- Discharge
  - average: 12.8 m^{3}/s (450 cu ft/s)

Basin features
- Progression: Neman→ Baltic Sea

Ramsar Wetland
- Official name: Cepkeliai mire
- Designated: 20 August 1993
- Reference no.: 625

Ramsar Wetland
- Official name: Kotra
- Designated: 21 October 2002
- Reference no.: 1216

The Kotra (Belarusian: Котра; Lithuanian: Katra) is a 109-kilometre-long (68 mi) river in Belarus and Lithuania. The river is an example of a rare phenomenon of river bifurcation.

At first, the Kotra and Ūla form one river, known as the Pelesa, which originates in Belarus and flows in a northwesterly direction. Just past the Belarus–Lithuania border, between the villages of Paramėlis and Kazliškės, some 22 kilometres (14 mi) southeast of Varėna, it branches out into two independent rivers: the Kotra, a tributary of the Neman, and the Ūla, a tributary of the Merkys. The bifurcation happened in the second half of the 19th century when the Ūla, due to its channel erosion, crossed the water divide between its own and the Kotra's drainage basins. As a result, the Ūla enlarged its basin by some 410 square kilometres (160 sq mi) and the Kotra lost two of its tributaries. These processes also caused a decrease in groundwater levels and the almost total disappearance of several lakes in the area.

The Kotra flows along the Belarus–Lithuania border for 24 kilometres (15 mi) and the remaining 85 kilometres (53 mi) through Belarus. It then flows along the southern border of Čepkeliai Marsh, the area protected as a nature reserve With the changes in drainage basins and groundwater levels, some 20 square kilometres (7.7 sq mi) of open marshes overgrew with trees. The Kotra and its surrounding marshes form wetlands of international importance: Kotra Ramsar site and Cepkeliai Ramsar site Varėna district municipality established a 1.085-square-kilometre (0.419 sq mi) reservoir to protect the natural Kotra environment.

== Etymology ==
The name Katra/Kotra is very unclear. Aleksandras Vanagas reconstructed a very dubious Proto-Indo-European root *kataro- ('a trench, rivulet, stream', as for Italian river Catarona or Liburnian river Καταρβάτης) from which originated the name of the river. Simas Karaliūnas suggested a Slavic borrowing in Lithuanian katãryti/katãlyti (from Russian: колотить, колотать) 'to beat, to whip' as a possible source of the name. Edward Bogusławski presented Kotra as a Finno-Ugric name (without further elaborating it; Rimvydas Kunskas suggested Finnish: *kaatarha 'to flood (kaataa) a backgarden (tarha)'). Šarūnas Šimkus suggests the name may come from a pronoun Lithuanian: katrà, katarà, Russian: котора(я), Ukrainian: котра 'which [of both]' (fem.) as a reference to a very tangled upper course of this river.
