= Dubininkas =

Coordinates: 54°05′50″N 24°17′00″E

- Village
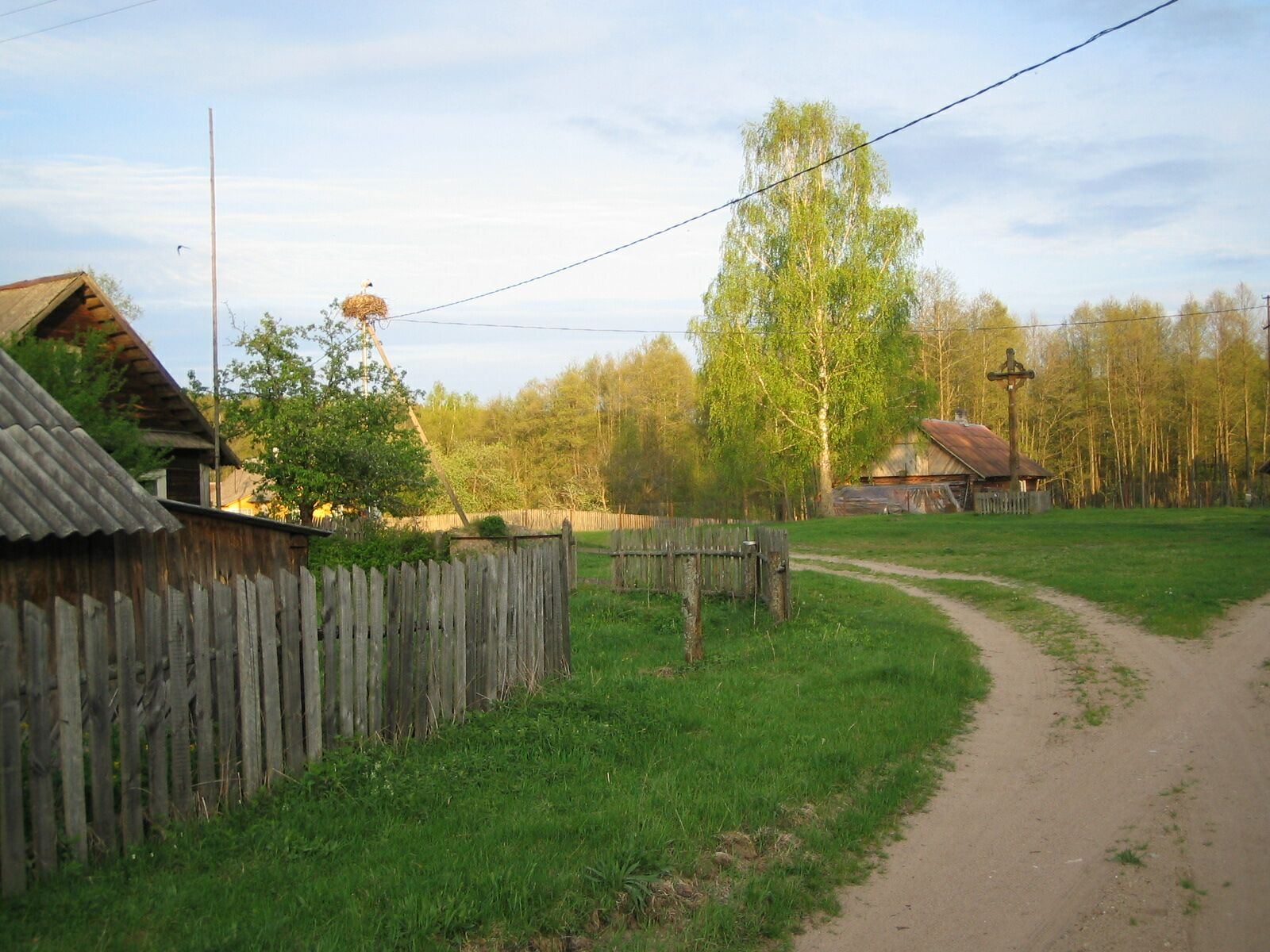
- Interactive map of Dubininkas
- Country: Lithuania
- County: Alytus County
- Municipality: Varėna

Population (2001)
  - Total: 5
- Time zone: UTC+2 (EET)
  - Summer (DST): UTC+3 (EEST)

Dubininkas is a village in Varėna district municipality, in Alytus County, in southeastern Lithuania. According to the 2001 census, the village has a population of 5 people.

== Etymology ==
The name Dubininkas (in Dzūkian Dubinykas) is of uncertain origin. There is a word Lithuanian: dùbininkas which means 'an owner of duba ' where duba could mean either 'a home, a homested', either 'a tree hollow' (but no of these meanings collected in Dzūkija Region). Another possibility is that dùbininkas could mean 'a tanner' (form Lithuanian: dū̃bas, dū̃bai 'tree barks for tanning') as Belarusian: дубільнік, Russian: дубитель 'a tanner'.
