= Kašėtos (Marcinkonys) =

Coordinates: 54°06′26″N 24°20′49″E

- Village
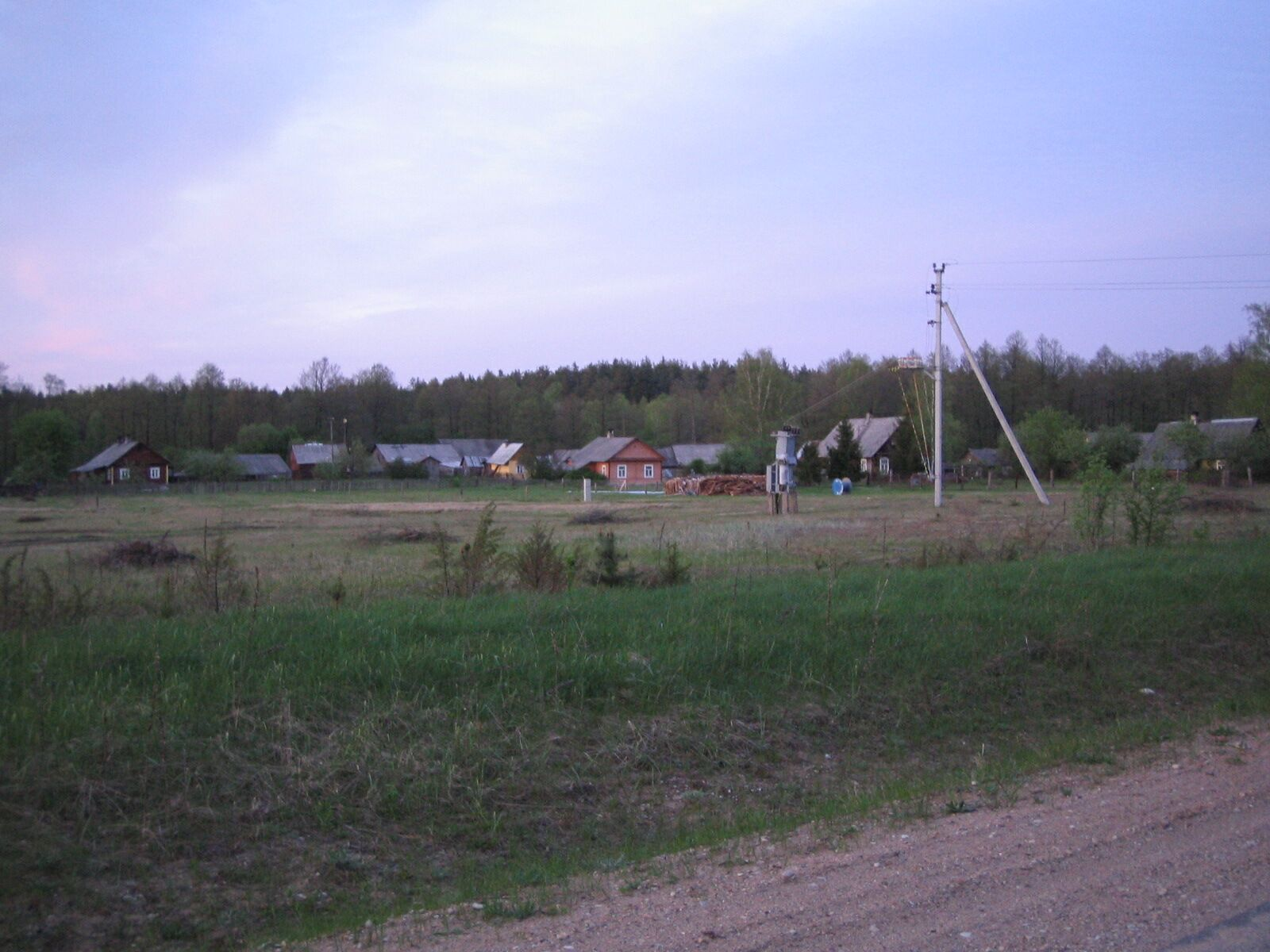
- Interactive map of Kašėtos
- Country: Lithuania
- County: Alytus County
- Municipality: Varėna

Population (2001)
  - Total: 24
- Time zone: UTC+2 (EET)
  - Summer (DST): UTC+3 (EEST)

Kašėtos is a village in Varėna district municipality, in Alytus County, in southeastern Lithuania. According to the 2001 census, the village has a population of 24 people.

== Etymology ==
The name Kašėtos comes from a popular Dzūkian personal name Kašėta.
