= Dupas =

Dupas may refer to:

- Alain Dupas (1945–2022), French astronomer and astrophysicist
- Benjamin Dupas, co-creator of the TV series Vampires
- Jean Dupas (1882–1964), French painter
- Pascaline Dupas, French economist
- Peter Dupas (born 1953), Australian convicted serial killer
- Pierre-Louis Dupas (1761–1823), French soldier
- Ralph Dupas (1935–2008), American boxer

== Other ==
- Île-Dupas, an island of La Visitation-de-l'Île-Dupas, Quebec

== See also ==
- Dubas (disambiguation)
