= Puvočiai =

- Village
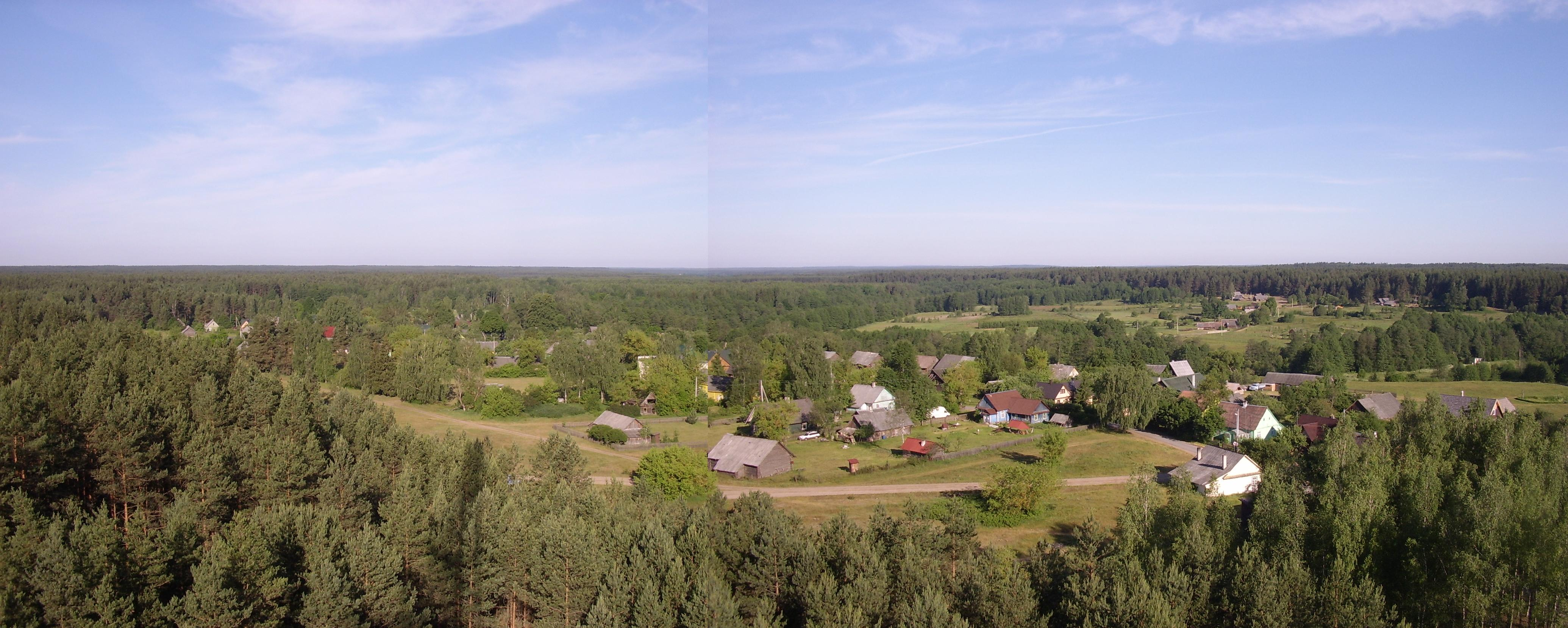

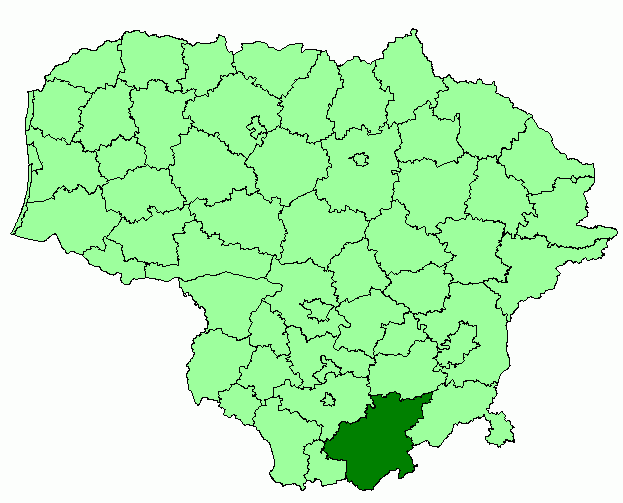
- Location in Varėna district municipality Location of Varėna district in Lithuania
- Coordinates: 54°07′N 24°18′E
- Country: Lithuania
- County: Alytus
- Municipality: Varėna
- Eldership: Marcinkonys

Population (2021 Census)
  - Total: 50
- Time zone: UTC+2 (EET)
  - Summer (DST): UTC+3 (EEST)

Puvočiai is a village in Marcinkonys Eldership, Varėna district municipality, Alytus County, southeastern Lithuania. According to the 2001 census, the village had a population of 71 people. At the 2011 census, the population was 57.

Puvočiai village is located c. 30 kilometres (19 mi) from Varėna, 34 kilometres (21 mi) from Druskininkai, 3 kilometres (1.9 mi) from Trasninkas (the nearest settlement).

== Etymology ==
The name Puvočiai (known as Polish: Puchacze, Puhacze, Russian: Пугачи, romanized: Pugachi in earlier written sources) comes a popular Dzūkian personal name Pugãčius, Pugačiáuskas, Pugačáuskas which originates from Slavic names Пугач (it means 'a horned owl'). The current form Puvočiai sounds as made from Lithuanian: pūti 'to rot' because of paronymic attraction.
