= Darželiai (Varėna) =

Coordinates: 54°01′N 24°20′E

- Village
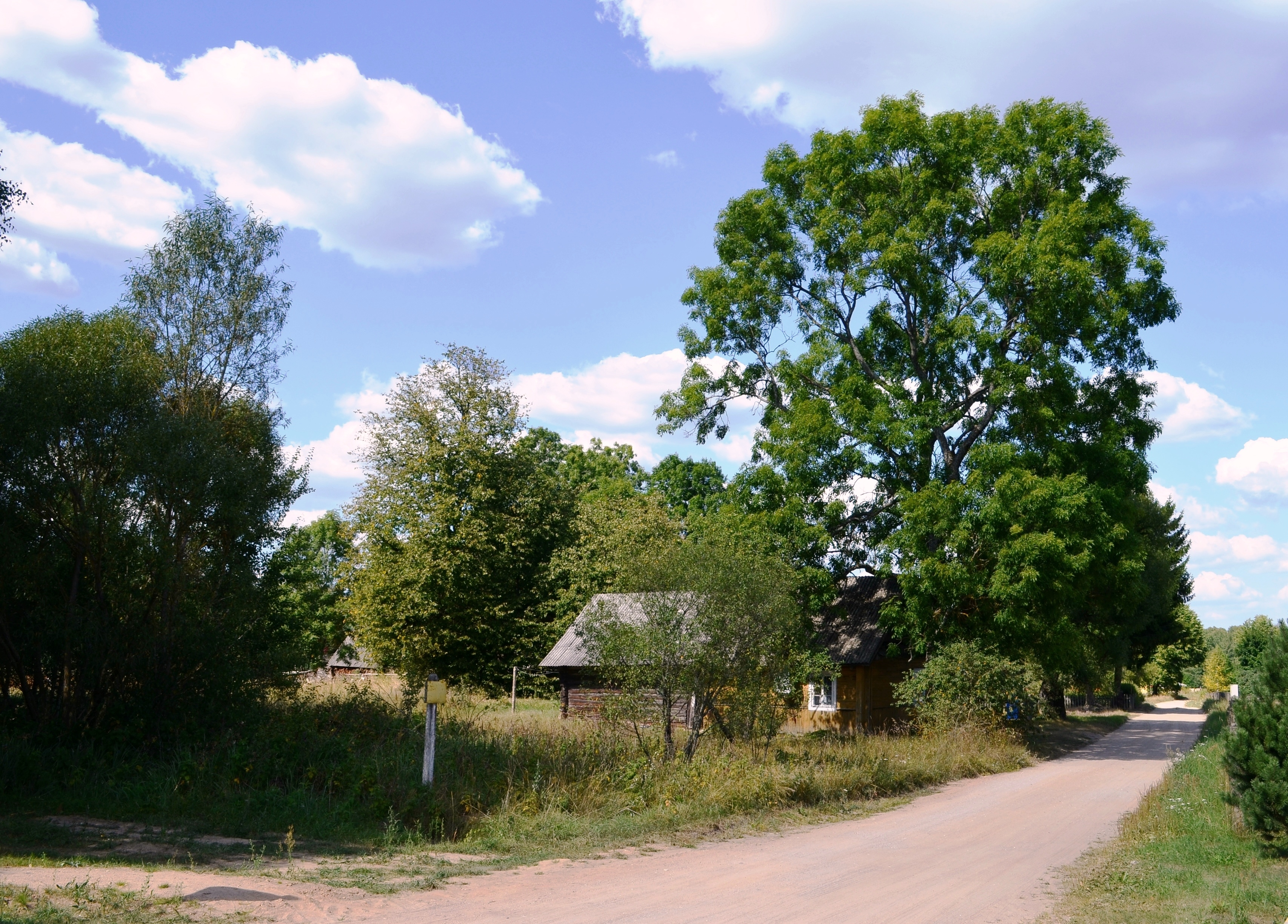
- Interactive map of Darželiai
- Country: Lithuania
- County: Alytus County
- Municipality: Varėna

Population (2021)
  - Total: 39
- Time zone: UTC+2 (EET)
  - Summer (DST): UTC+3 (EEST)

Darželiai is a village in Varėna district municipality, in Alytus County, in southeastern Lithuania. According to the 2001 census, the village has a population of 61 people.

Darželiai village is located c. 27 kilometres (17 mi) from Druskininkai, 30 kilometres (19 mi) from Varėna, 4 kilometres (2.5 mi) from Kapiniškiai (the nearest settlement).

== Etymology ==
The name Darželiai (known as Polish: Derżelańce in earlier written sources) comes from a word darželis which means 'a little vegetable garden'. Probably it reflects that village may originated from a gardening place by the Grūda River.
