= Senovė (Varėna) =

Coordinates: 53°57′15″N 24°14′19″E

- Village
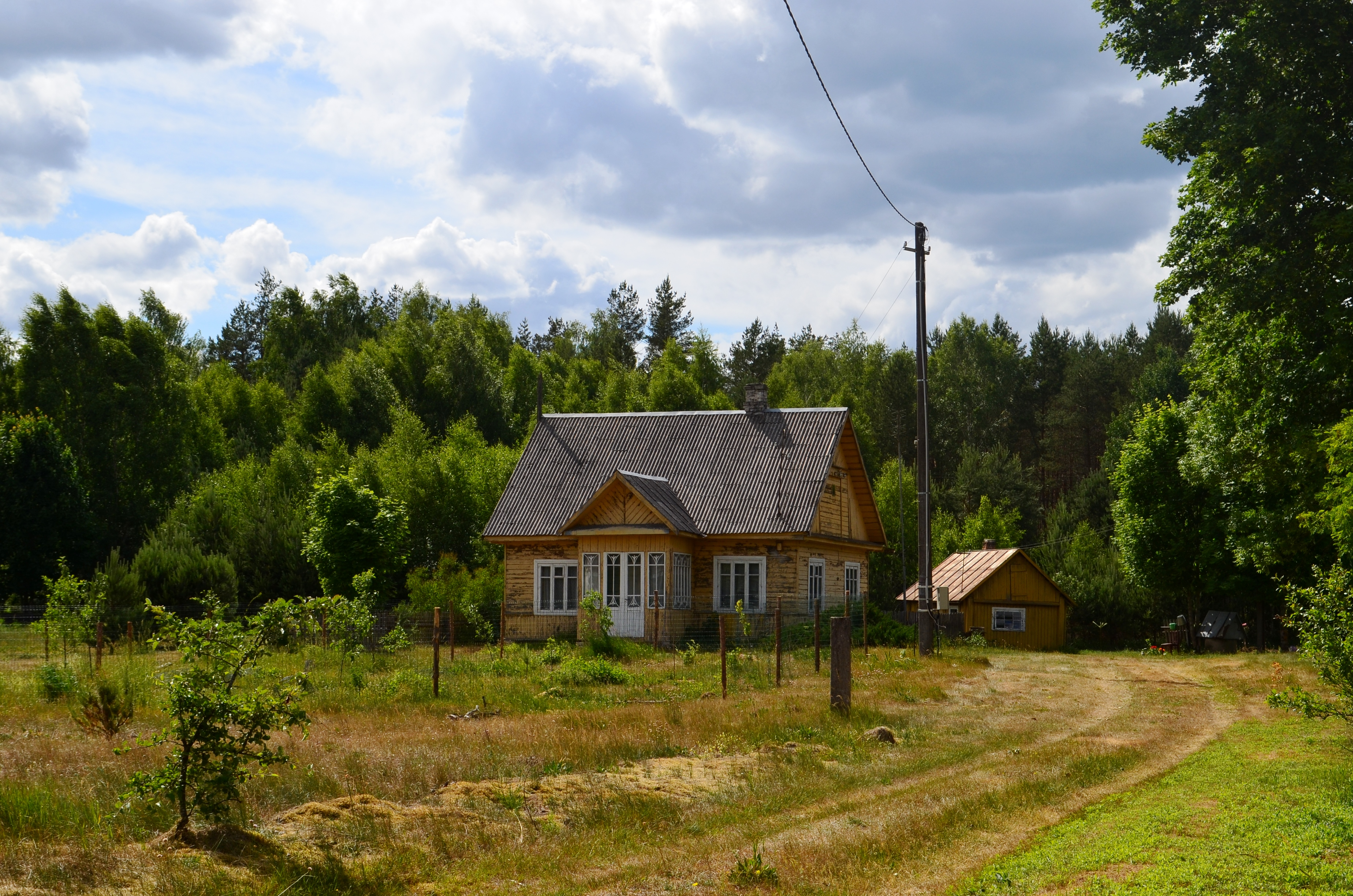
- Interactive map of Senovė
- Country: Lithuania
- County: Alytus County
- Municipality: Varėna

Population (2021)
  - Total: 4
- Time zone: UTC+2 (EET)
  - Summer (DST): UTC+3 (EEST)

Senovė is a village in Varėna district municipality, in Alytus County, in southeastern Lithuania. According to the 2021 census, the village has a population of 4 people.

Senovė village is located c. 23 kilometres (14 mi) from Druskininkai, 17 kilometres (11 mi) from Marcinkonys, 3 kilometres (1.9 mi) from Šklėriai (the nearest settlement), 1 kilometre (0.62 mi) from the Belarusian border.

== Etymology ==
The name Senovė comes from a Lithuanian: senóvė with a meaning 'a long ago fertilized field' (instead of much popular meaning 'ancient times').
