= Dubas (Varėna) =

- Village
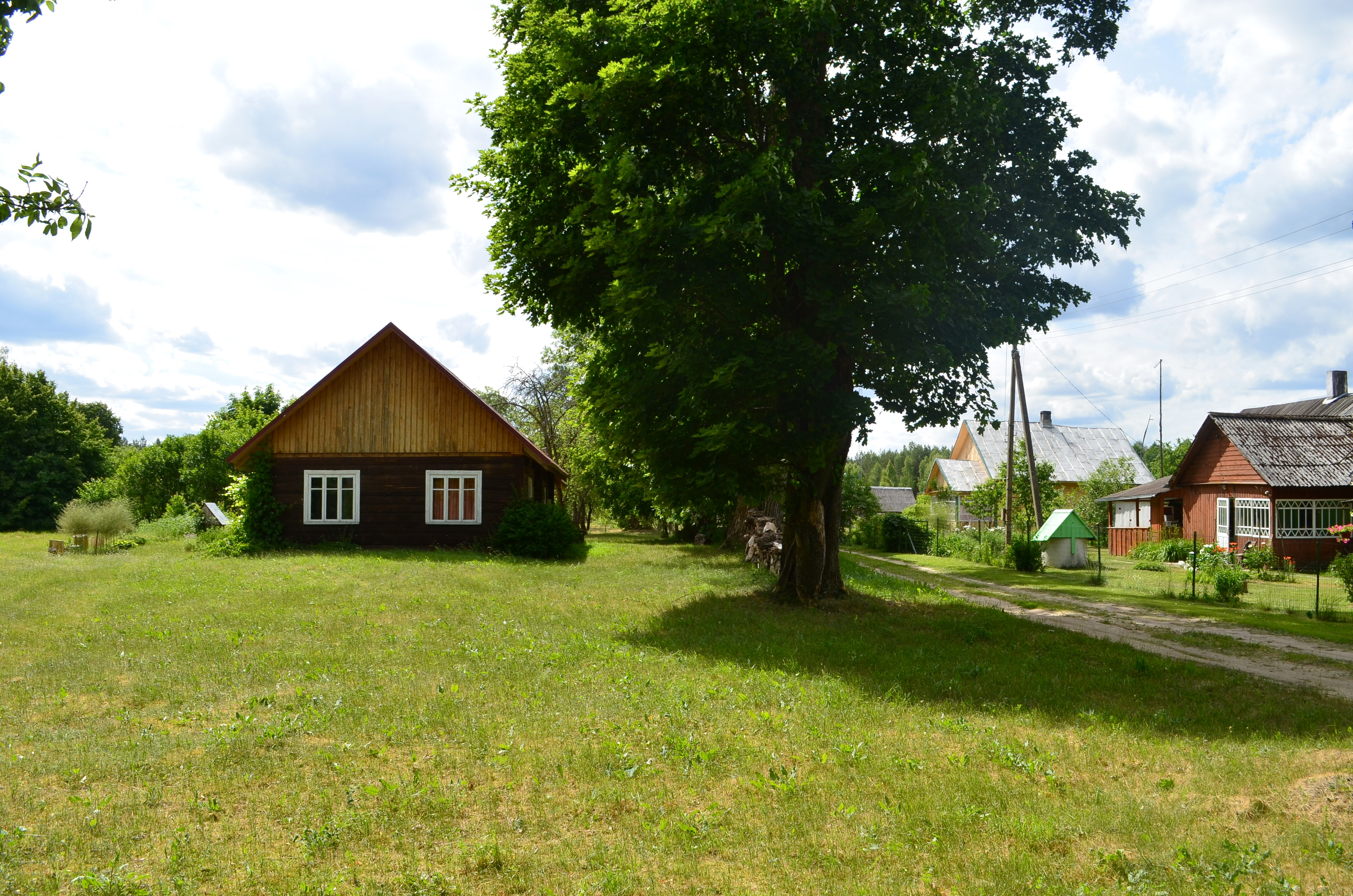

- Location in Lithuania
- Coordinates: 53°58′26″N 24°13′23″E
- Country: Lithuania
- County: Alytus County
- Municipality: Varėna District Municipality
- Elderships: Marcinkonys Eldership

Population (2021)
  - Total: 7
- Time zone: UTC+2 (EET)
  - Summer (DST): UTC+3 (EEST)

Dubas is a village in Varėna District Municipality, Alytus County, in southeastern Lithuania. According to the 2021 census, the village had a population of 27 people. In 1921–1945, the village was within the borders of the Second Polish Republic.

Ašašninkai village is located about 15 kilometres (9.3 mi) from Druskininkai, 1 kilometre (0.62 mi) from Šklėriai (the nearest settlement), 2 kilometres (1.2 mi) from the border with Belarus.

== Etymology ==
The name Dubas or Dūbas comes from the name of the nearby Dubas Lake. It is from a Lithuanian root dub- 'to sink, to sag' (as in words duobė 'a pit', duburys 'a waterhole'). The village is known as Polish: Wierchdubie-Morozik, Russian: Верхъ-Дубъ-Морозик in earlier sources. The part Wierchdubie means 'a place upon Dubas [lake]' and Morozik may be from a personal name of Slavic origin Lithuanian: Marõzas, Marõza, Belarusian: Mapoз, Маpoзаў, Маpoзька.
