= Paronymic attraction =

Mix up between words that sound similar

Paronymic attraction is popular or folk etymology arising from similarity of appearance or sound.

It is the distorting effect exerted on a word by one of its paronyms (that is, a quasi-homonym) according to etymology and onomastics. Paronymic attraction is the origin of many names. There are even cross-linguistic instances of such attractions. For example, the resemblance between the Romanian word locaţie (space for which rent should be paid) and the English word location helped a semantic shift of the former word to include the latter sense.

Paronymic attraction is commonly expressed through the replacement of a word whose meaning is not understood. For example, in the French language, interpoler (to add something in the middle of writing) and interpeller (to question someone formally) are sometimes substituted for each other because of their similar sound, despite their differences in meaning.

== See also ==
- Barbarism (linguistics)
- Lemma (morphology)
- Morphology (linguistics)
- False etymology
