= Mardasavas (Marcinkonys) =

- Village
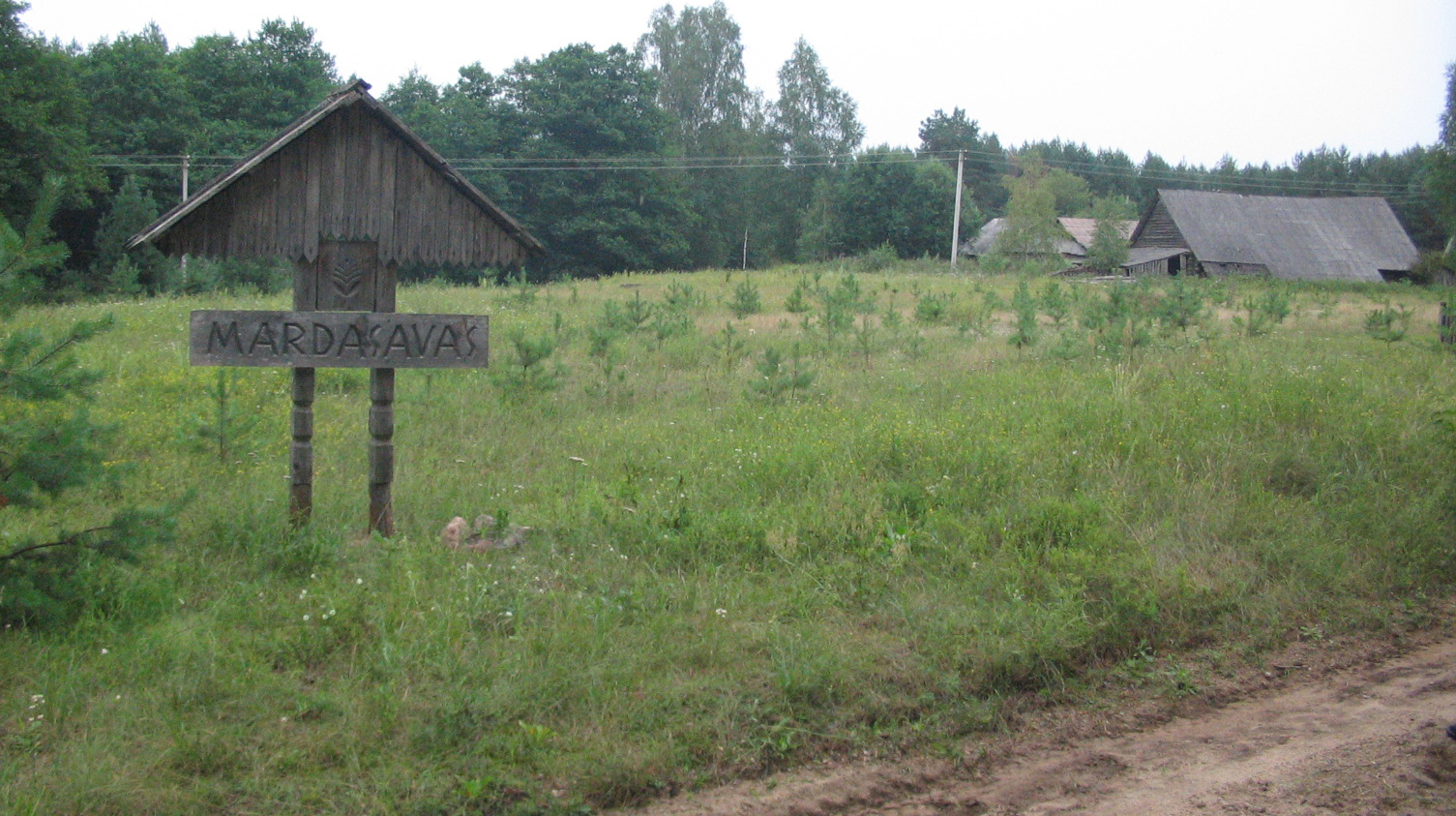

- Location within Varėna District Municipality Location within Lithuania
- Country: Lithuania
- County: Alytus County
- Municipality: Varėna

Population (2021)
  - Total: 31
- Time zone: UTC+2 (EET)
  - Summer (DST): UTC+3 (EEST)

Mardasavas is a village in Varėna district municipality, in Alytus County, in southeastern Lithuania. According to the 2011 census, the village has a population of 26 people.

Mardasavas village is located c. 23 kilometres (14 mi) from Varėna, 38 kilometres (24 mi) from Druskininkai, 3 kilometres (1.9 mi) from Puvočiai (the nearest settlement).

== Etymology ==
The name Mardasavas comes from a personal name Lithuanian: Mardõsas, Mar̃dosa, Mardasas which correspondingly originates from Slavic personal names Belarusian: Мардас, Мордас, Маpдасевiч, Ukrainian: Мордас.
