= Lavysas =

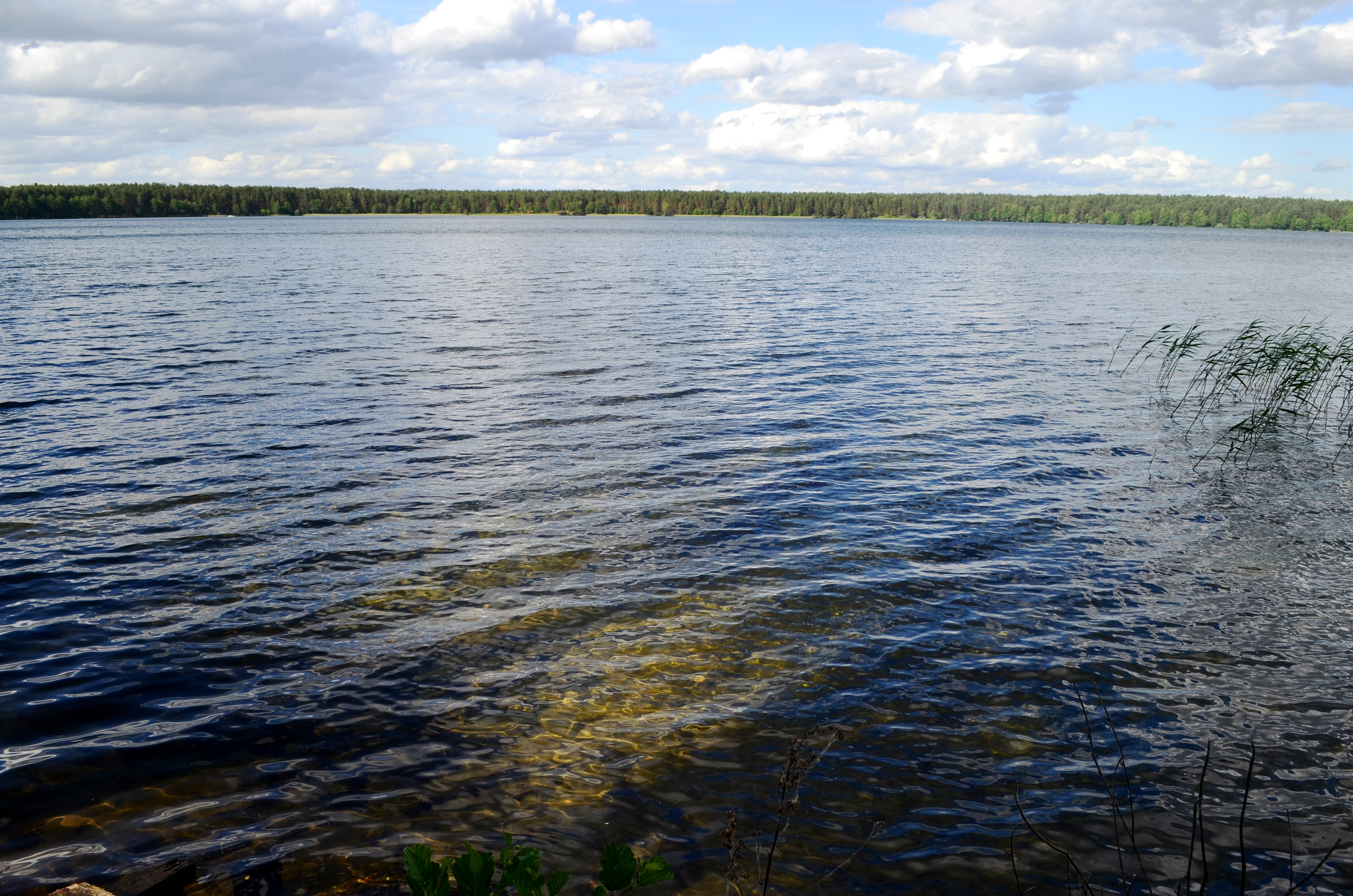
- Lake Lavysas from western shore

- Location within Lithuania
- Location: Varena district, Lithuania
- Coordinates: 54°10′N 24°25′E
- Type: glacial lake
- Primary inflows: Merkys, Lavysa
- Max. length: 1.5 kilometres (0.93 mi)
- Max. width: 1.2 kilometres (0.75 mi)
- Max. depth: 10.2 metres (33 ft)

Lavysas is a lake in southern Lithuania, Varena district, about 5 miles (8.0 km) south of Perloja and 10 miles (16 km) southwest of Varena, surrounded by the Dainava forest. The lake is 1.5 kilometres (0.93 mi) long and has a width up to 1.2 kilometres (0.75 mi). The maximum depth is 10.2 metres (33 ft). The lake is of glacial origin, thermokarst, and forms an oval shape. The shores are sandy and covered with coniferous forests. The southern coast on the other hand is swampy. The lake collects the water from two streams, the Merkys and its tributary the Lavysa. It is located to the east of the village of Lavyso. Close to the lake are many campsites and rest houses.
