= Daržinėlės =

- Village
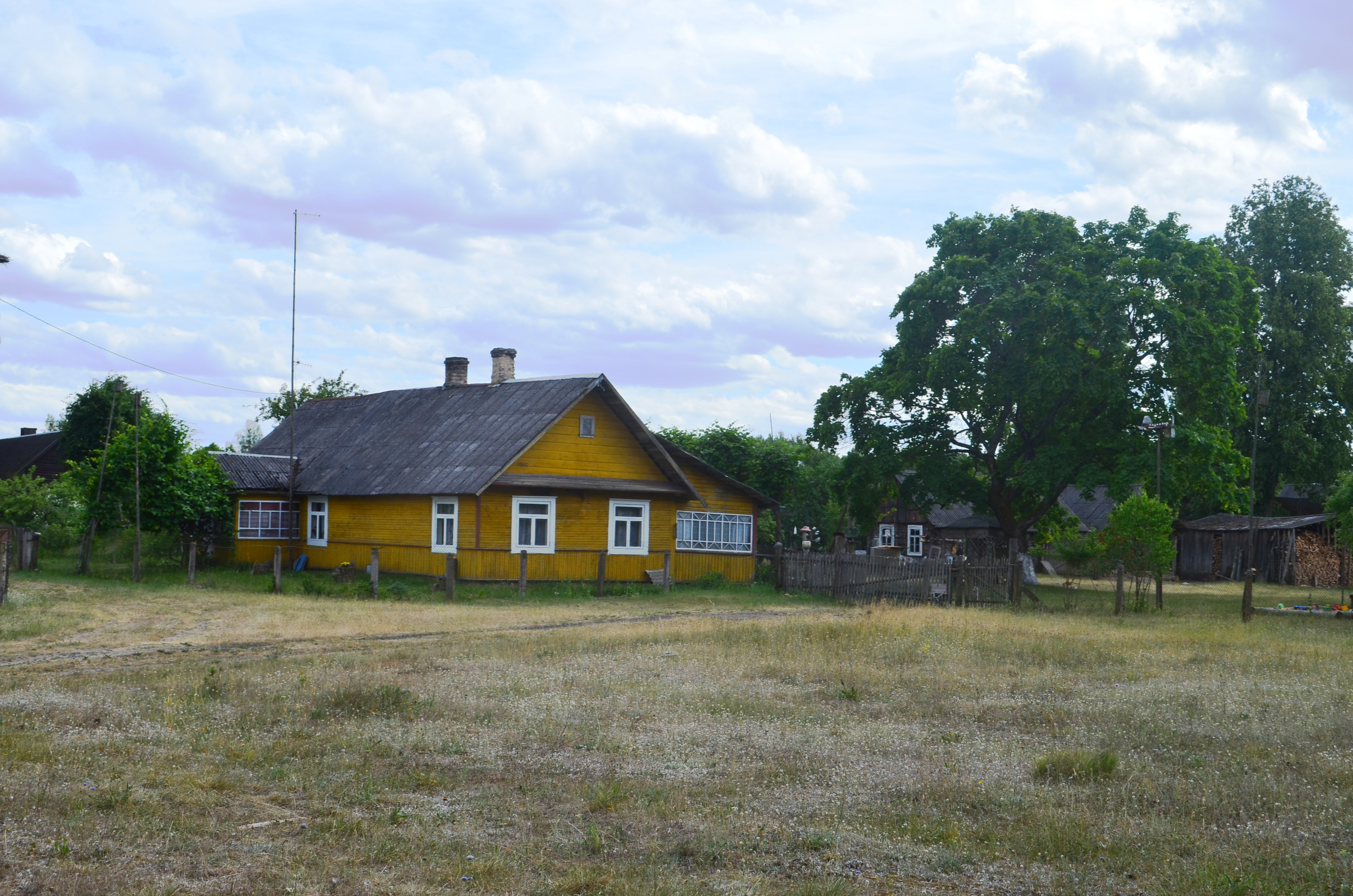

- Location within Lithuania
- Coordinates: 53°56′28″N 24°16′39″E
- Country: Lithuania
- County: Alytus County
- Municipality: Varėna

Population (2021)
  - Total: 19
- Time zone: UTC+2 (EET)
  - Summer (DST): UTC+3 (EEST)

Daržinėlės is a village in Varėna district municipality, in Alytus County, in southeastern Lithuania. According to the 2001 census, the village has a population of 12 people.

Daržinėlės village is located c. 25 kilometres (16 mi) from Druskininkai, 19 kilometres (12 mi) from Marcinkonys, 1 kilometre (0.62 mi) from Kabeliai (the nearest settlement), 1 kilometre (0.62 mi) from the Belarusian border.

== Demography ==
Historical population

| Year | Pop. | ±% |
|---|---|---|
| 1959 | 34 | — |
| 1979 | 27 | −20.6% |
| 1989 | 23 | −14.8% |

| Year | Pop. | ±% |
|---|---|---|
| 2001 | 12 | −47.8% |
| 2011 | 22 | +83.3% |
| 2021 | 19 | −13.6% |

Source: 1959, 1979, 1989, 2001, 2011 2021

== Etymology ==
The name Daržinėlės comes from a plural form of a word Lithuanian: daržinėlė ('a little shed'). The village is known as Polish: Świnny Las, Russian: Свинны-Ляс in earlier sources. It means 'a pig forest' in Slavic languages.
