= Mardasavas (Merkinė) =

Coordinates: 54°09′N 24°19′E

- Village
- Interactive map of Mardasavas (Merkinė)
- Country: Lithuania
- County: Alytus County
- Municipality: Varėna

Population (2001)
  - Total: 34
- Time zone: UTC+2 (EET)
  - Summer (DST): UTC+3 (EEST)

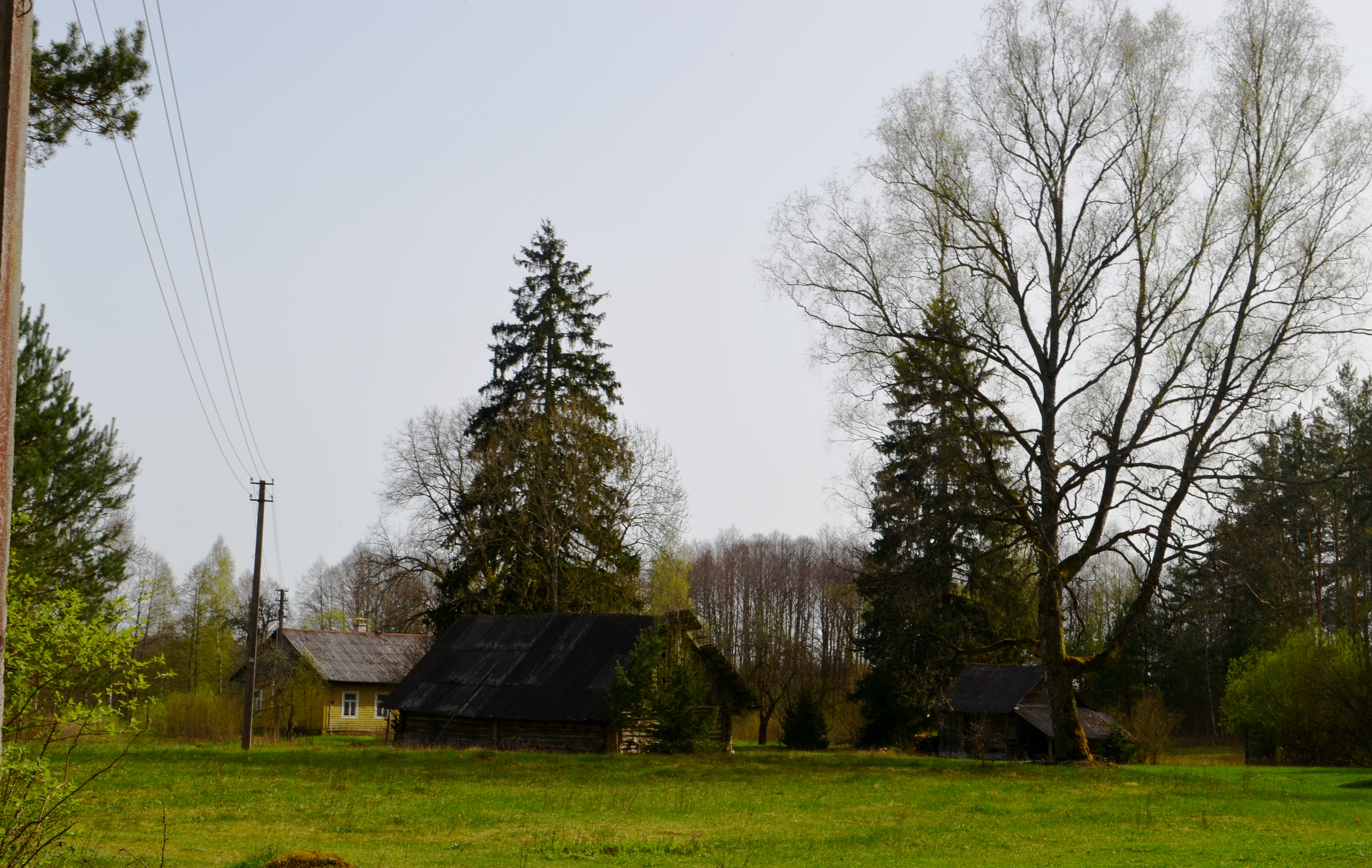
Mardasavas village, Merkinės parish, Varėna district

Mardasavas (Merkinė) is a village in Varėna district municipality, in Alytus County, in southeastern Lithuania.

== Demographics ==
According to the 2001 census, the village has a population of 34 people.
