= Mančiagirė =

Coordinates: 54°08′N 24°28′E

- Village
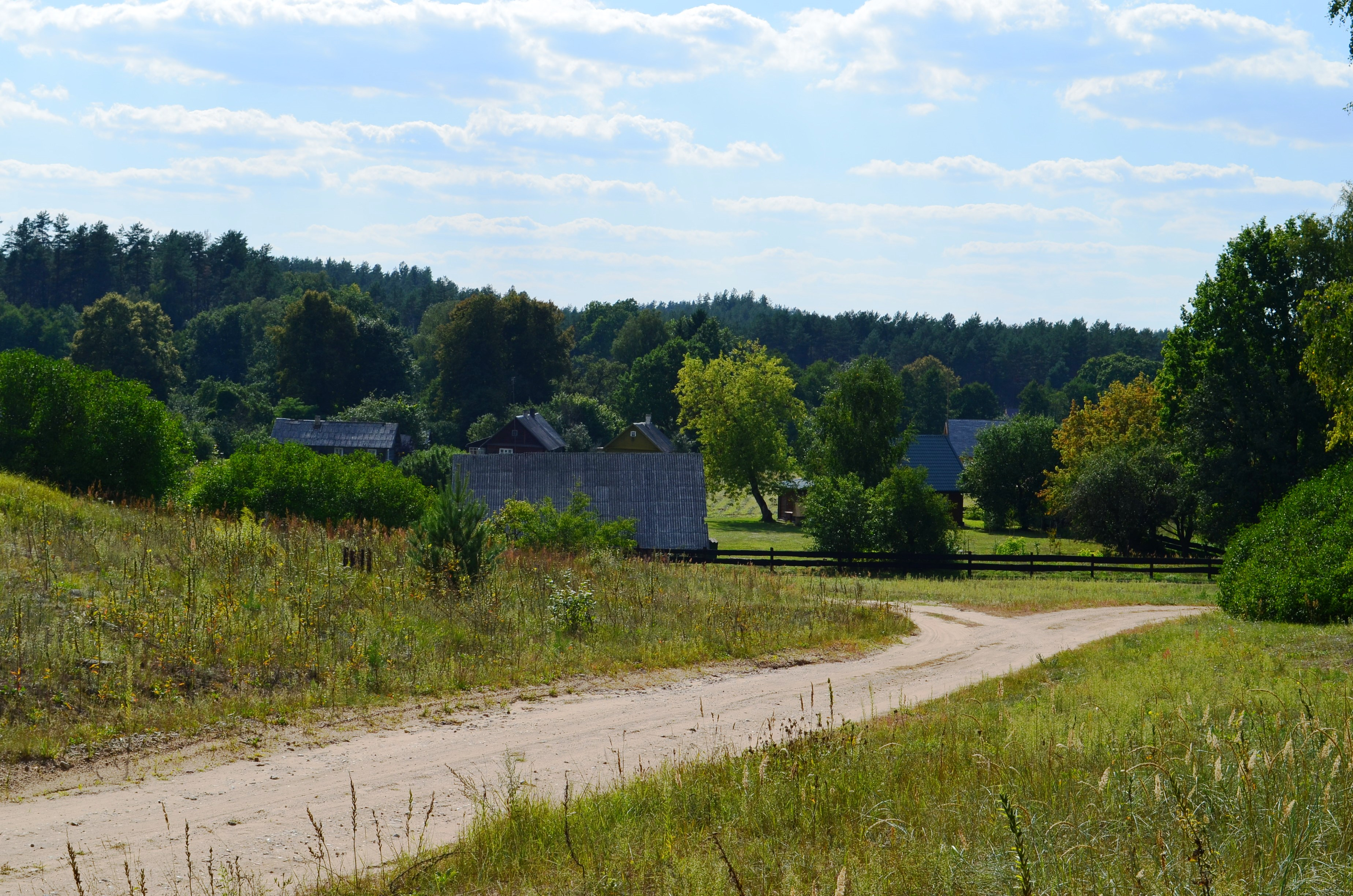
- Interactive map of Mančiagirė
- Country: Lithuania
- County: Alytus County
- Municipality: Varėna

Population (2001)
  - Total: 24
- Time zone: UTC+2 (EET)
  - Summer (DST): UTC+3 (EEST)

Mančiagirė is a village in Varėna district municipality, in Alytus County, in southeastern Lithuania. According to the 2001 census, the village has a population of 24 people.

== Etymology ==
The name Mančiagirė comes from a personal name Lithuanian: Mañčius, Moñčius, Moñčis (or Slavic forms Polish: Męcz, Mączko, Męczko, Russian: Манчинский) and a word Lithuanian: giria 'a forest, a wood'.
