= Trakiškiai (Varėna) =

Coordinates: 54°08′40″N 24°23′30″E

- Village
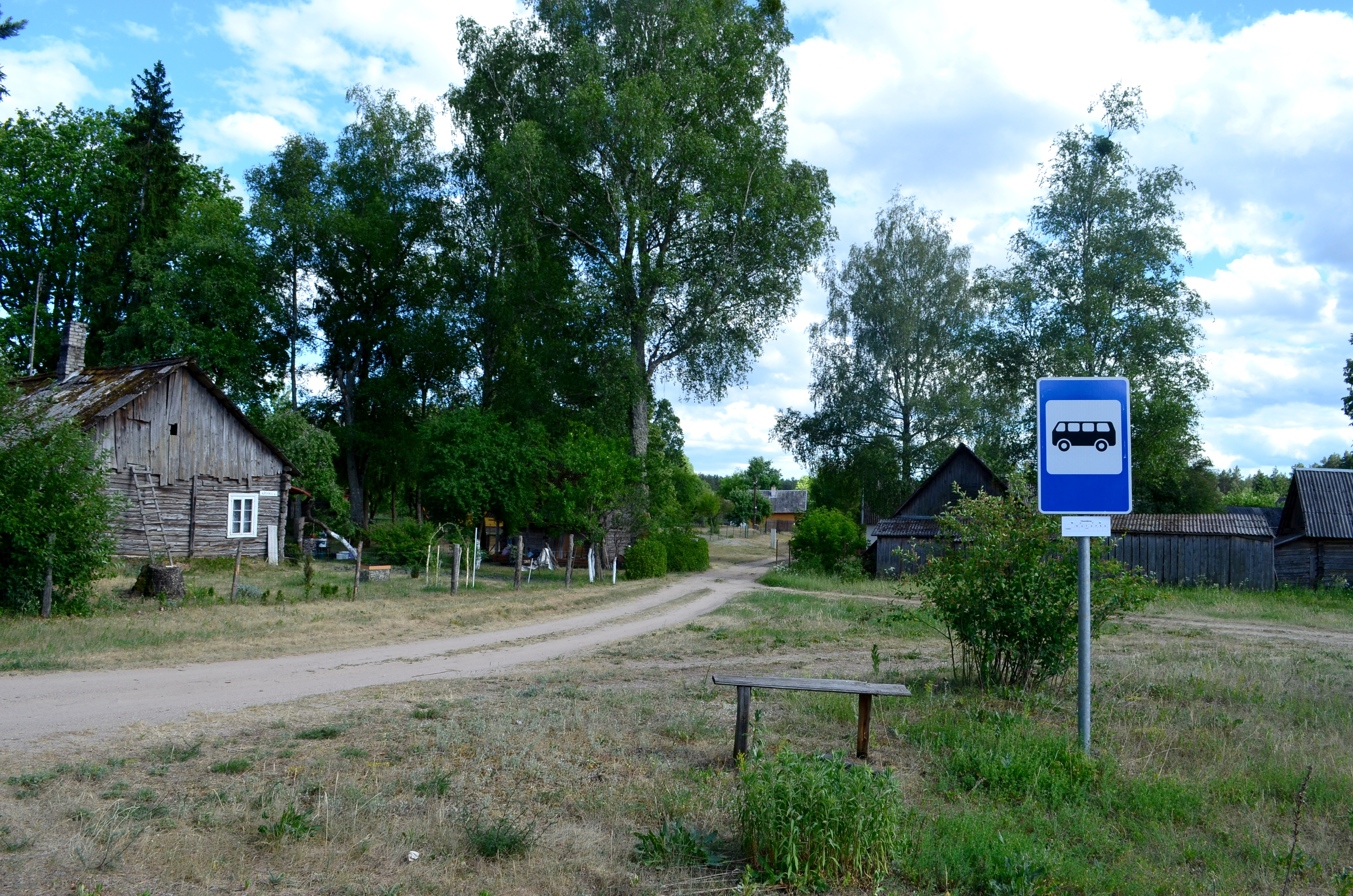
- Interactive map of Trakiškiai
- Country: Lithuania
- County: Alytus County
- Municipality: Varėna

Population (2001)
  - Total: 22
- Time zone: UTC+2 (EET)
  - Summer (DST): UTC+3 (EEST)

Trakiškiai is a village in Varėna district municipality, in Alytus County, in southeastern Lithuania. According to the 2001 census, the village has a population of 22 people.

== Etymology ==
The name Trakiškiai means 'settlers of an isle, glade (trakas)'.
