= Šklėriai (Varėna) =

- Village
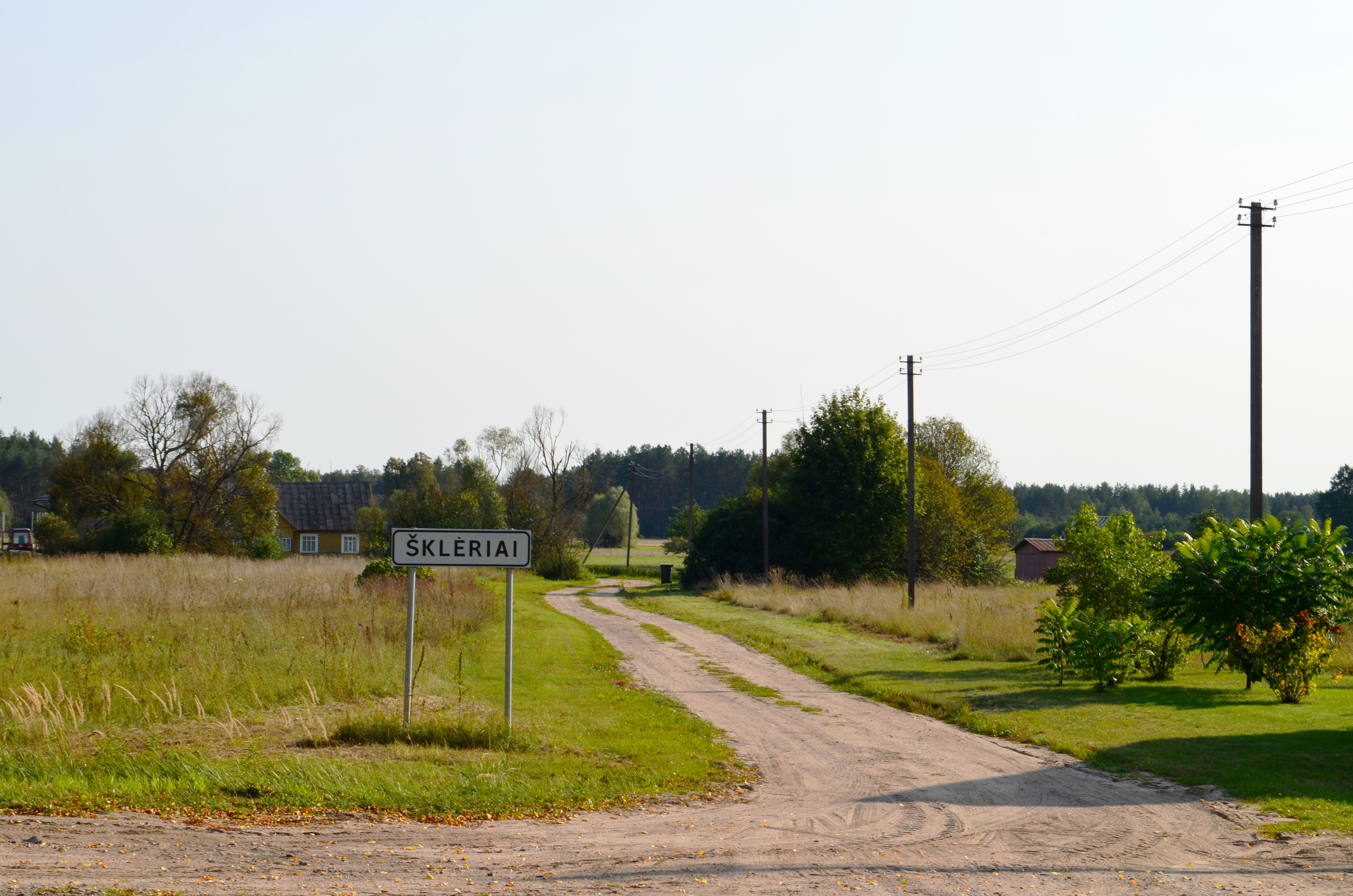

- Location in Lithuania Šklėriai (Lithuania)
- Coordinates: 53°58′40″N 24°14′20″E
- Country: Lithuania
- County: Alytus County
- Municipality: Varėna district municipality
- Eldership: Marcinkonys eldership

Population (2021)
  - Total: 30
- Time zone: UTC+2 (EET)
  - Summer (DST): UTC+3 (EEST)

Šklėriai is a village in Varėna district municipality, in Alytus County, southeastern Lithuania.

Šklėriai village is located c. 20 kilometres (12 mi) from Druskininkai, 15 kilometres (9.3 mi) from Marcinkonys, 5 kilometres (3.1 mi) from Margionys (the nearest settlement) and 2 kilometres (1.2 mi) from the Belarusian border.

== Etymology ==
The name Šklėriai comes from a word Lithuanian: šklė̃rius (borrowing from Polish: szklarz, Belarusian: шкляр) 'a glazier'.
