= Margionys =

- Village
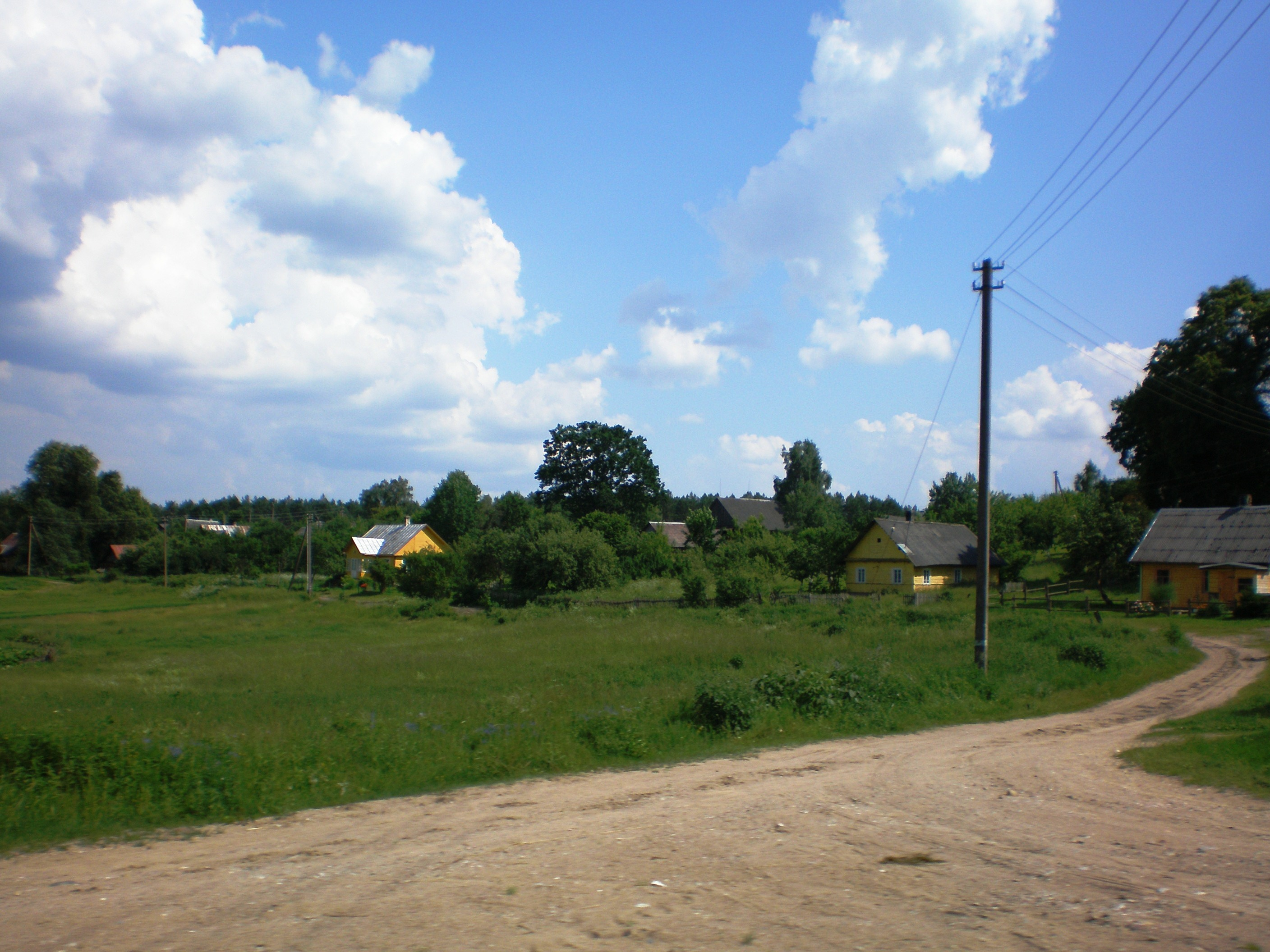
- street in Margionys

- Location of Margionys Margionys (Lithuania)
- Coordinates: 54°00′0″N 24°17′0″E
- Country: Lithuania
- Ethnographic region: Dzūkija
- County: Alytus County
- Municipality: Varėna district municipality
- Eldership: Marcinkonys eldership

Population (2021)
  - Total: 39
- Time zone: UTC+2 (EET)
  - Summer (DST): UTC+3 (EEST)

Margionys is a village in Dzukija National Park, Varėna District Municipality, Lithuania, located south-west of Marcinkonys, 115 km away from Vilnius, 50 km away from Alytus and at the hand's reach from Druskininkai.

Back in the year 1637, Margionys had 11 households. Number of households in the village increased to 44 by the year 1889, with a total population of 271 individuals at the time. After the plague and wars, the village shrank, with only two families living in it in 1738. By 1959, the village again had 261 inhabitants. This number has decreased to 98 in 1998 and 81 in 2003.

== Etymology ==
The name Margionys (known as Polish: Morgiewicze, Russian: Моргевичи, German: Morgjewitschi in earlier written sources) comes from a personal name Margẽvičius or Márgis which may be from Lithuanian: mar̃gis, márgis. This word either means 'a speckled one' or margas ('morgen'). The prior village name was Skroblininkai which was granted according the name of the Skroblus stream.
