= Ūla =

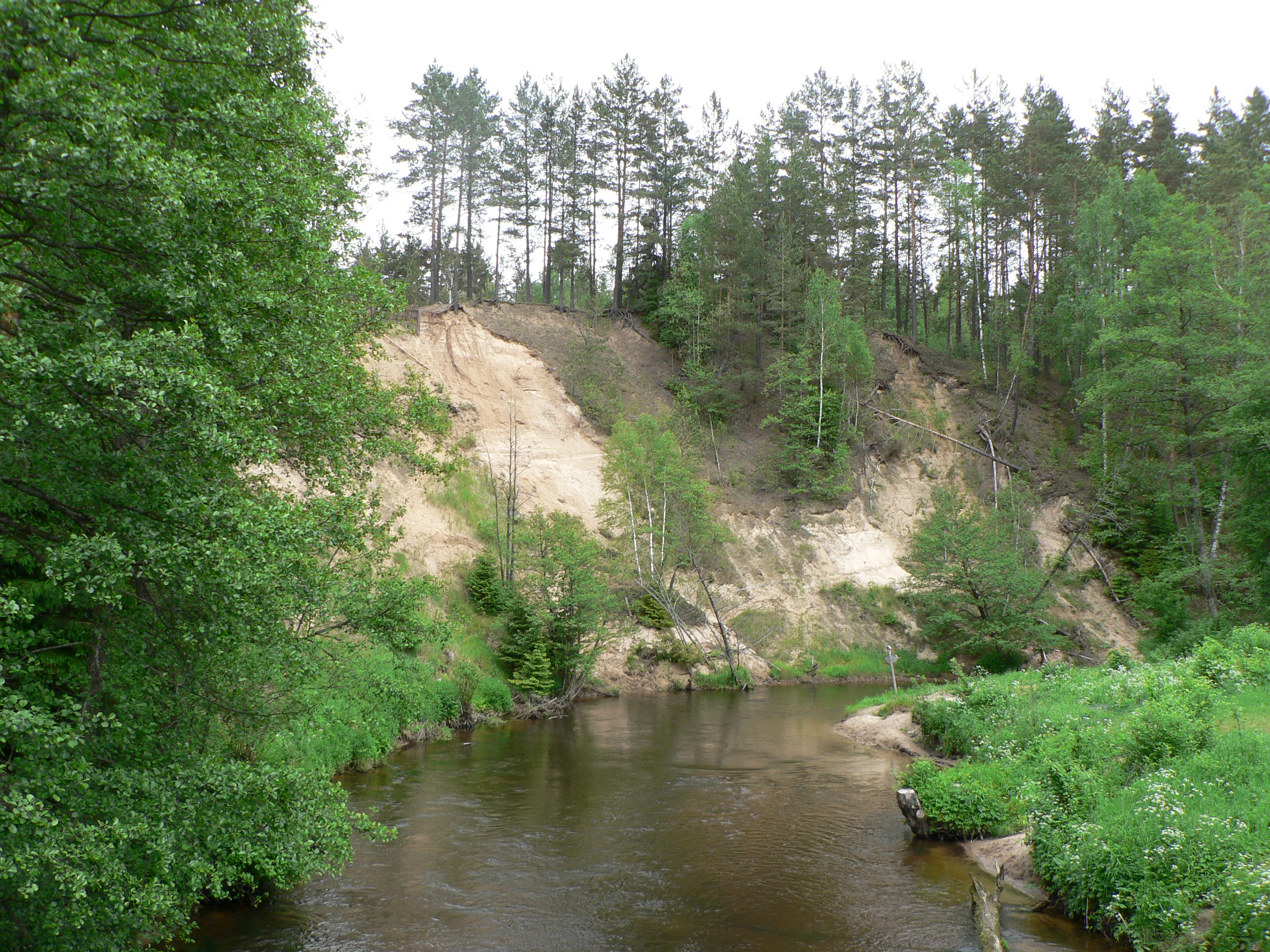
- A bend in the river Ūla

Location
- Country: Lithuania and Belarus

Physical characteristics
- Source
  - location: Grodno Region
- Mouth: Merkys
  - coordinates: 54°09′50″N 24°20′11″E
- Length: 84 km (52 mi)
- Basin size: 753 km^{2} (291 sq mi)
- Discharge
  - average: 5.58 m^{3}/s (197 cu ft/s)

Basin features
- Progression: Merkys→ Neman→ Baltic Sea

The Ūla (Belarusian: Ула) is a river which starts in northern Belarus and flows into the Merkys river, in southern Lithuania.

It starts as a confluence of two channeled rivers, Provozha (Провожа) and Luchka (Лучка) by the Padeyki village. From Luchka to Dubičiai it is known as Pelesa (Padzeyka in Belarus). Its total length is 84 kilometres (52 mi), of which 13.5 kilometres (8.4 mi) are in Voranava District, Grodno Region, Belarus; three kilometres (1.9 mi) are along the Belarus-Lithuania border; and the rest is in Varėna District, Lithuania, of which part flows through the Ūla Landscape Reserve and then in the Dzūkija National Park. It flows into the Merkys near Paūliai.

== See also ==
- Kotra (river)
