= Merkys =

River in Lithuania and Belarus

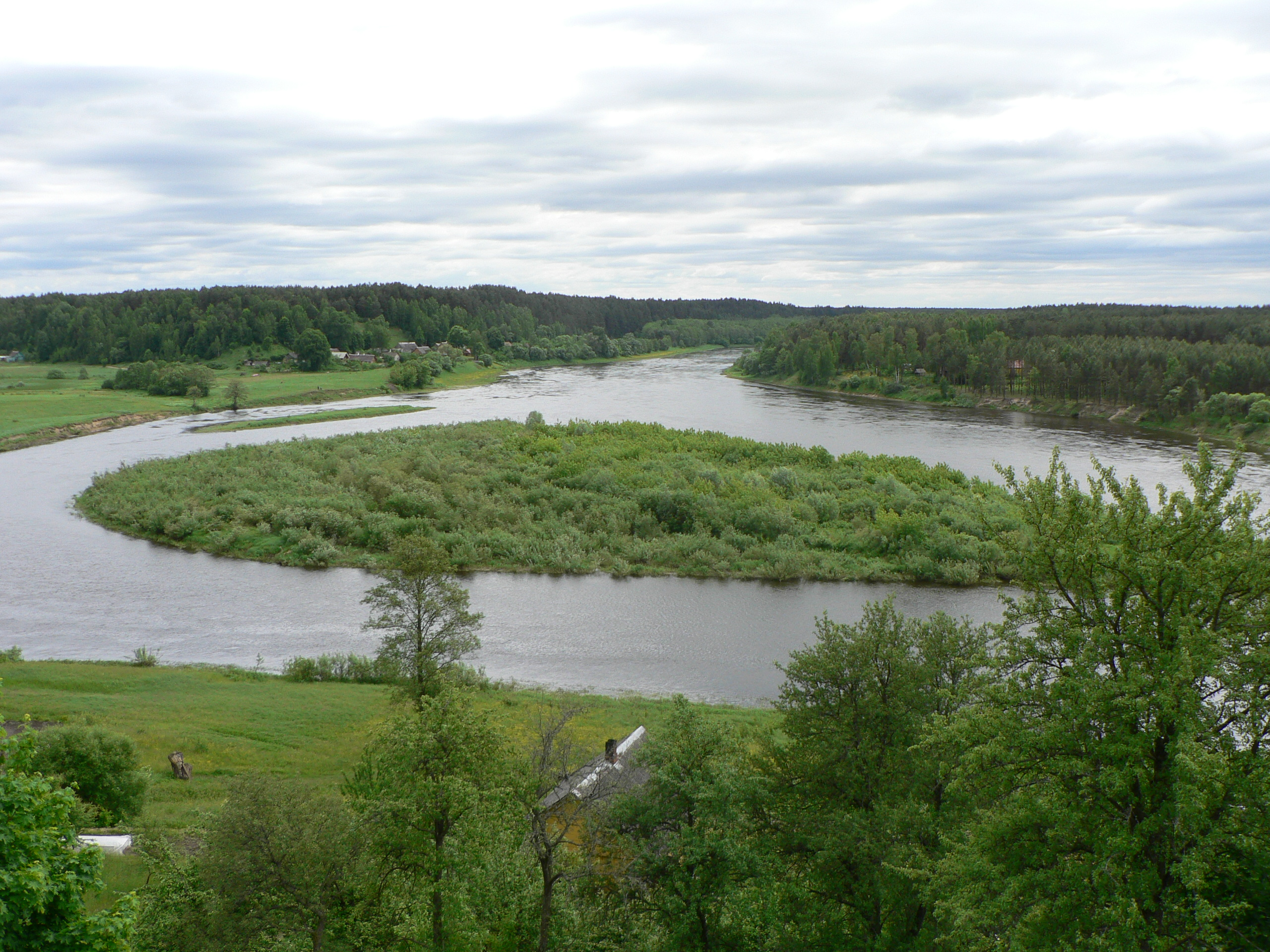
- Confluence of the Merkys and Neman at Merkinė

Location
- Country: Lithuania (3,781 km^{2} or 1,460 mi^{2}), Belarus (635 km^{2} or 245 mi^{2})

Physical characteristics
- Source
  - location: 18 km (11 mi) southwest from Ašmiany, Belarus
  - elevation: 136 m (446 ft)
- Mouth: Neman
  - location: near Merkinė
  - coordinates: 54°09′23″N 24°11′07″E
- Length: 213 km (132 mi)
- Basin size: 4,416 km^{2} (1,705 sq mi)
- Discharge
  - average: 21 m^{3}/s (740 cu ft/s) (near Varėna)

Basin features
- Progression: Neman→ Baltic Sea
- Tributaries
  - left: Šalčia, Verseka, Ūla
  - right: Spengla, Varėnė

The Merkys (Belarusian: Мяркіс, romanized: Miarkis) is a river in southern Lithuania and northern Belarus. It flows for 13 km (8 mi) through Belarus, 5 km (3 mi) along the Belarusian–Lithuanian border, and 195 km (121 mi) through Lithuania before joining the Nemunas from the right bank near Merkinė.

The Merkys is mostly fed by underground streams and therefore is cooler during summers and has smaller fluctuations in water level than other rivers in Lithuania. Near Žagarinė (128 km or 80 mi before its mouth) the Merkys is connected with Lake Papys by a canal. The Vokė originates from this lake and consumes most of the Merkys' water. Before the canal average discharge of the Merkys is 3 m^{3}/s (110 cu ft/s) and below it only 0.7 m^{3}/s (25 cu ft/s). At the end of the 19th century the drainage basin of the Merkys grew by some 410 km^{2} (160 sq mi) as its tributary Ūla overtook some of the Kotra's watershed area.

The Merkys is a popular destination among water tourism enthusiasts as part of it belongs to the Dzūkija National Park and it flows into the Neman near the historical site of Merkinė. Archaeological findings show that people inhabited the area as early as the Mesolithic period. The Merkys is known for its diverse fauna, being declared a reservoir for trout in 1974.

== Name ==
The name of the river, Merkys, originate from merkti, an appellative word in the Lithuanian language meaning to soak.
