= Cultural regions of Lithuania =

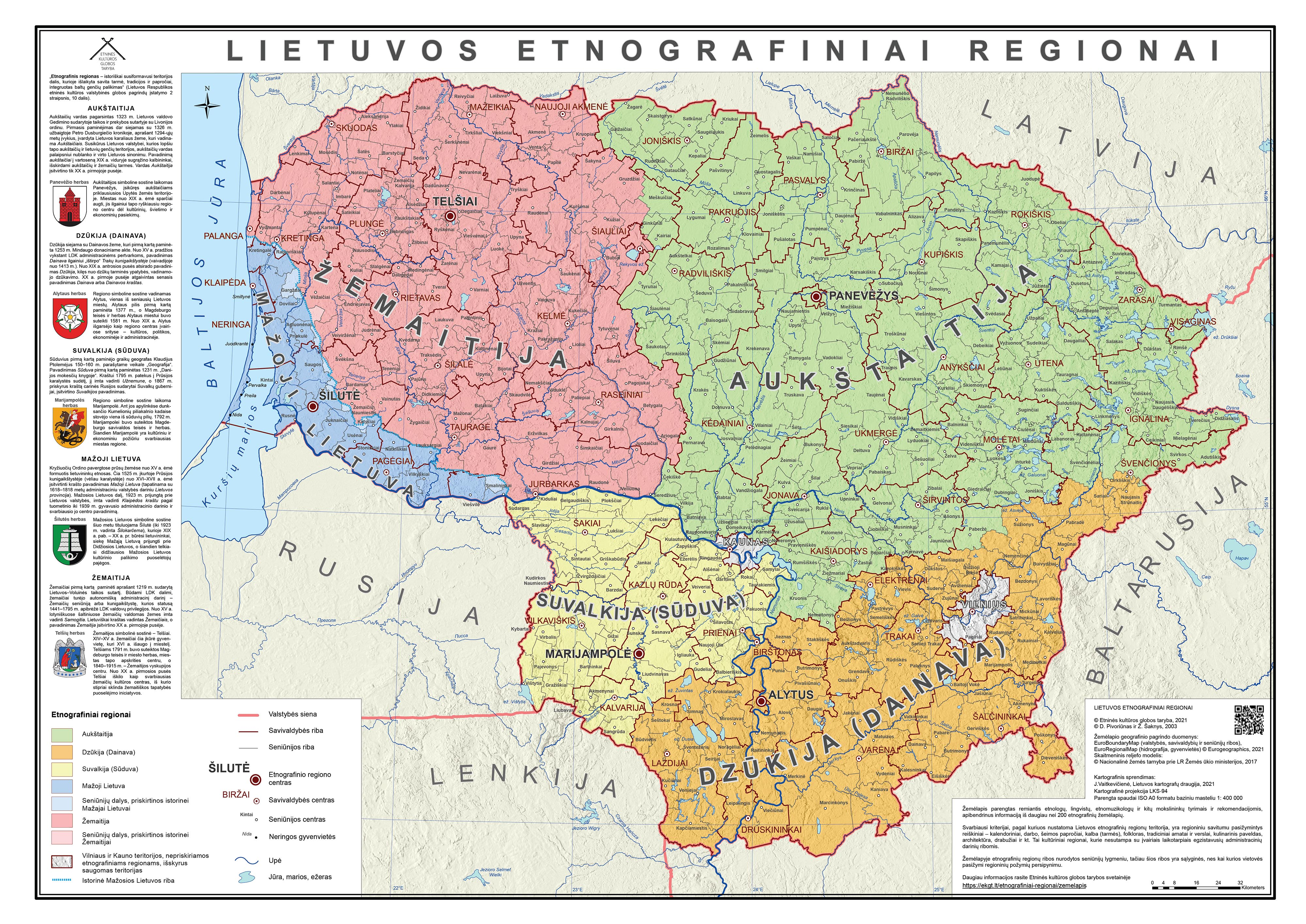
Detailed map of Lithuanian ethnographic regions (after the 2022 revision) within the modern borders of the country

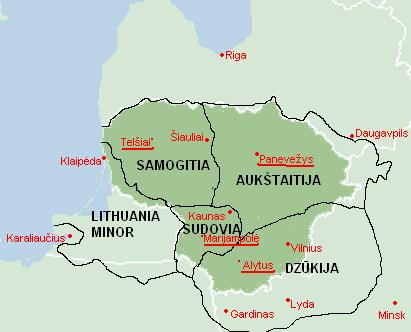
Historical ethnographic regions

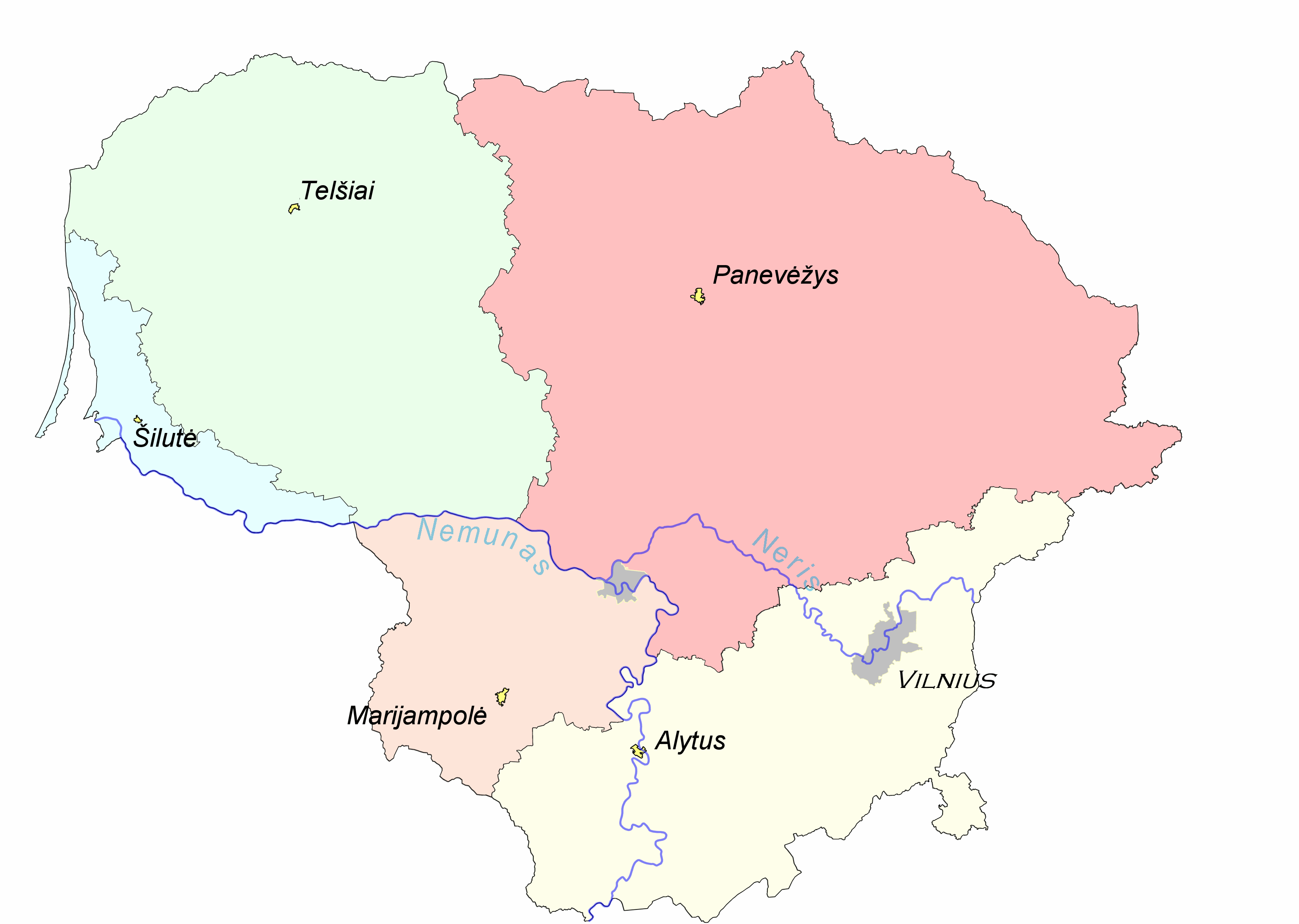
Regions within the borders of modern Lithuania. Based on the map approved by the Council for the Protection of Ethnic Culture, a special council established by Seimas. Lithuania Minor (Mažoji Lietuva) Samogitia (Žemaitija; Samogitian: Žemaitėjė) Aukštaitija Suvalkija (Sūduva) Dzūkija (Dainava)

Lithuania can be divided into five historical and cultural regions (called ethnographic regions). The exact borders are not fully clear, as the regions are not official political or administrative units. They are delimited by culture, such as country traditions, traditional lifestyle, songs, tales, etc. To some extent, regions correspond to the zones of Lithuanian language dialects. This correspondence, however, is by no means strict. For example, although the Dzūkian dialect is called South Aukštaitian, it does not mean that Dzūkija is part of Aukštaitija. In certain parts of some regions, dialects of other regions are spoken, while for example in Samogitia, there are three indigenous dialects (southern, northern and western Samogitian), some of which are subdivided into subdialects.

== Regions in politics ==
No region, except for Samogitia, has ever been a political or an administrative entity. Throughout most of Lithuanian history the cultural regions of Aukštaitija, Suvalkija and Dzūkija were together known as the historical land of Lithuania Proper which was the core of the Lithuanian state during the Grand Duchy era. However, some work was done recently to delineate their boundaries more clearly, as there is a project to change the system of counties in Lithuania into ethnographic regions, which would be called lands (žemės). This project is also supported by the view that with the limited functions of counties, 10 of them are not needed for Lithuania. Another supporting argument is that in other countries historical territories are being revived, while in Lithuania artificially made counties exist. The project was supported by the former president Rolandas Paksas, yet now it is not clear when or if the project will be completed at all. However, Dzūkija quite recently adopted the coat of arms and emblem which would be used if the reform were to be implemented. Alytus County, which lies almost entirely within Dzūkija, adopted soon afterwards a coat of arms that is based on the Dzūkija coat of arms. Samogitia has a flag and a coat of arms dating from the time of the Duchy of Samogitia; these symbols are considerably older than the flag of Lithuania. Lithuania Minor has a flag used since the 17th century, and an anthem originating from the 19th century. However, if the reform were to be implemented, most likely there would be just four lands, not five, because most of Lithuania minor is located within the modern borders of Russia (in the Kaliningrad Oblast) and many Lithuanians were expelled from there. The relatively small remaining part is also populated mostly by relative newcomers, as much of the local population died in the Second World War or was expelled. Therefore, Lithuania minor would probably be attached to Samogitia.

Even though the regions are not political/administrative entities, most regions have their "capitals" (cities which are commonly considered to be capitals). These cities are not necessarily the largest in the region.

== List of regions ==
Name	Flag	Coat of arms	Area (km^{2})	Population	Name in Lithuanian	Location of region	Capital	Largest city
Aukštaitija			27,564 (27,672 including Kaunas part)	656,737 (919,212 including Kaunas part)	Aukštaitija, literally Highlands	Northeastern Lithuania, also includes some historical Lithuanian territories of southwestern Latvia and northwestern Belarus.	Panevėžys	
Samogitia			16,872	506,665	Žemaitija, literally Lowlands	Western Lithuania	Telšiai	Šiauliai
Dzūkija			11,713 (12,114 including Vilnius)	330,678 (889,800 including Vilnius)	Dzūkija or Dainava: the latter name literally means "Land of songs".	Southeast of Lithuania, also includes vast historically Lithuanian territories of Belarus, and some territories of Poland.	Alytus	
Sudovia			5,745 (5,794 including Aleksotas Eldership and Panemunė Eldership)	203,018 (239,296 including Aleksotas Eldership and Panemunė Eldership)	Sūduva or Suvalkija: su- (near) and valka (creek, marsh)	Southwest of Lithuania, the smallest ethnographic region.	Marijampolė	
Lithuania Minor			2,848 (area on the right-bank of the Neman river (Klaipėda Region), excluding Kaliningrad Oblast side)	226,278 (population on the right-bank of the Neman river (Klaipėda Region), excluding Kaliningrad Oblast side)	Mažoji Lietuva	Baltic Sea coast, also includes territories with large historical Lithuanian population of what is now Kaliningrad Oblast and part of northern Poland.	Šilutė	Klaipėda

== See also ==
- Administrative divisions of Lithuania
- Counties of Lithuania
- Ethnographic Lithuania
- Geography of Lithuania
- Historical regions of Central Europe
