= Dzūkian dialect =

Lithuanian dialect

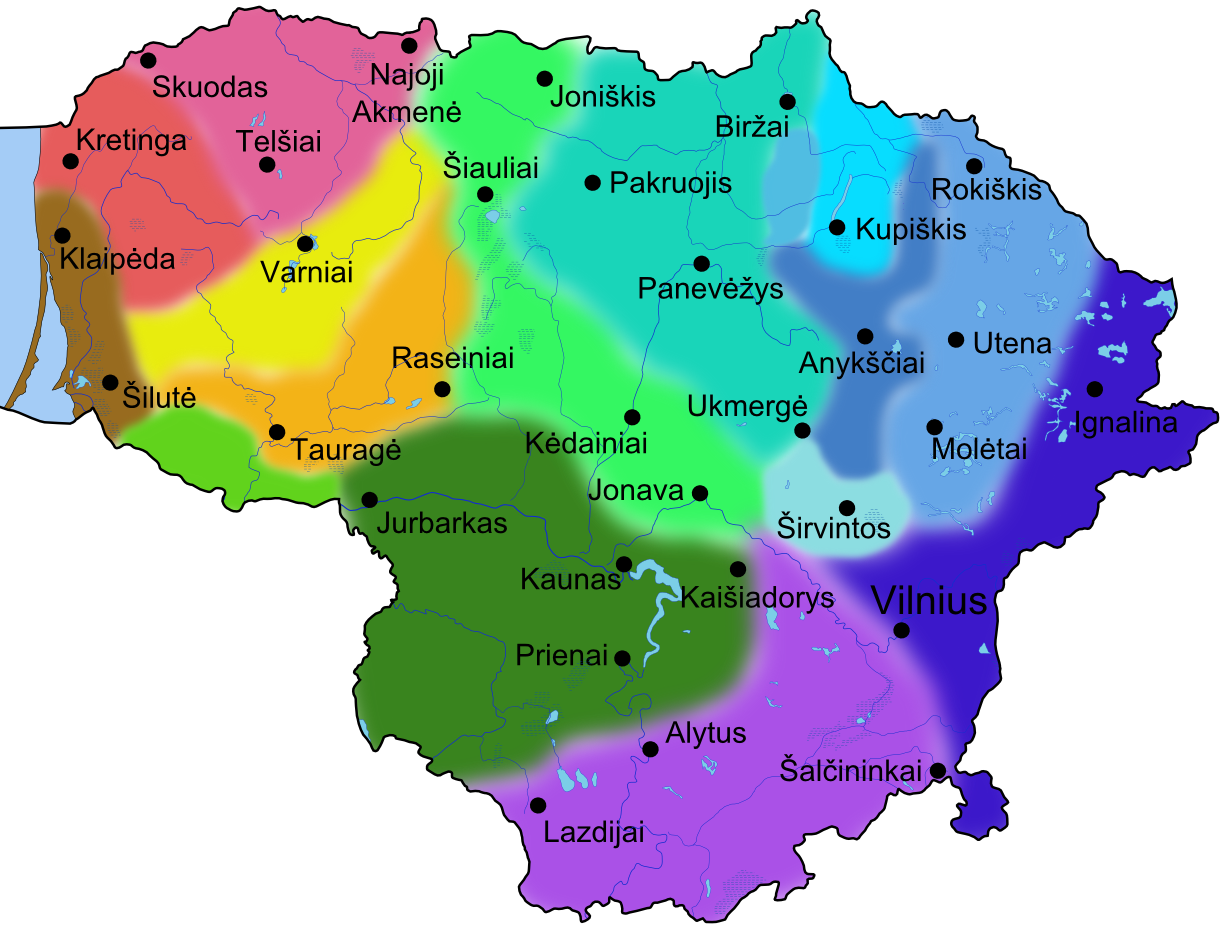
Map of the dialects of the Lithuanian language (Zinkevičius and Girdenis, 1965) Southern Aukštaitian or Dzūkian sub-dialect Vilnietian or Dzūkian sub-dialect

The Dzūkian dialect (Lithuanian: dzūkų tarmė), known in academic works as Southern Aukštaitian dialect (Lithuanian: pietų aukštaičių patarmė), is one of the three main sub-dialects of the Aukštaitian dialect of Lithuanian language. Dzūkian dialect is spoken in Dzūkija, southern Lithuania. Its most distinctive feature is replacing t, d before i, į, y, ie and č, dž with c and dz (cik instead of tik – just, dzidumas instead of didumas – size, pyn instead of pinti – to braid, sveciai instead of svečiai – guests). Another notable feature is the lengthening of vowels in closed syllables ending in sonorants, for example: tìltas (bridge) becomes tyltas, bùlvė (potato) - būlvė, or pìrmas (first) - pyrmas. Since the region borders Slavic lands, the dialect has many Slavic loanwords and barbarisms.
