= Latežeris (lake) =

Lake in Lithuania

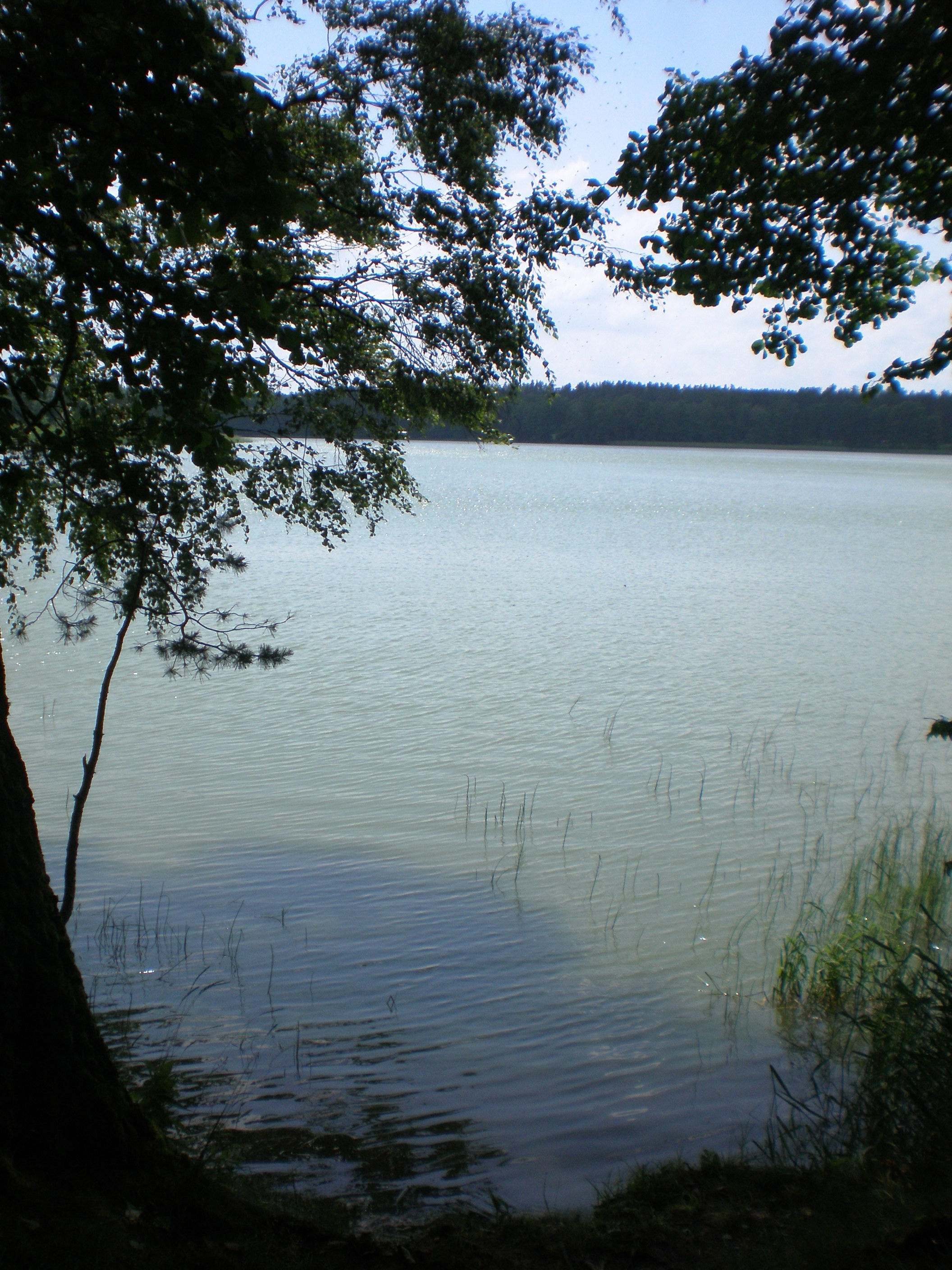
- View from the eastern side

- Location within Lithuania
- Coordinates: 53°59′N 24°5′E
- Primary outflows: Ratnyčia (river)
- Basin countries: Lithuania
- Max. length: 2.0 km (1.2 mi)
- Max. width: 900 m (3,000 ft)
- Surface area: 85.42 ha (211.1 acres)
- Average depth: 5.1 m (17 ft)
- Surface elevation: 105 m (344 ft)
- Settlements: Latežeris

Latežeris is a lake located near Latežeris village in Alytus county in southeastern Lithuania. It is located on the edge of the Dainava forest, about 7 km (4.3 mi) from the city of Druskininkai in the Druskininkai municipality. The Ratnyčia river, which originates in the Skleriai swamp flows through the lake to join the Nemunas river.

== Geography ==
Latežeris lake is located near Latežeris village in Alytus county in southeastern Lithuania. It is located on the edge of the Dainava forest, the largest forest area in Lithuania. It lies at an altitude of 105 m (344 ft), near the Belarusian border. The Ratnyčia river originates in the Skleriai swamp about 18 km (11 mi) from Druskininkai. The river flows south through Dubas before turning north and flowing through the lake Latežeris. From the lake, it traverses the border with Belarus, and joins the Nemunas river.

The lake stretches for 85.42 ha (211.1 acres) along a 5.8 km (3.6 mi) shoreline. The average depth was recorded as 5.1 m (17 ft).

== Composition ==
Studies in 2021 ascertained that the lake had a high total nitrogen content (>3 mg/l) and a considerably high phosphorus content (0.09-1.4 mg/l). As the lake is located in a forest area, it is not polluted by sewage, and it receives the entire mineral load from the forests.

== Fishing ==
The lake consists of various fishes such as pike, sherry, catfish, lyn, and silver carp. Fishing is only permitted for licensed fishermen, and no mechanized boats are allowed within 100 m (330 ft) of the lake.

== Settlement ==
The village of Latežeris is located on the northern bank of the lake. The lake is situated about 7 km (4.3 mi) from the city of Druskininkai. There is an underground bunker located on the northern shore. The bunker was built in 1947 by Lithuanians who fought against the Soviet occupation after the Second World War. The bunked went through several restorations including in 1997 and 2004.
