= Švendubrė =

- Village
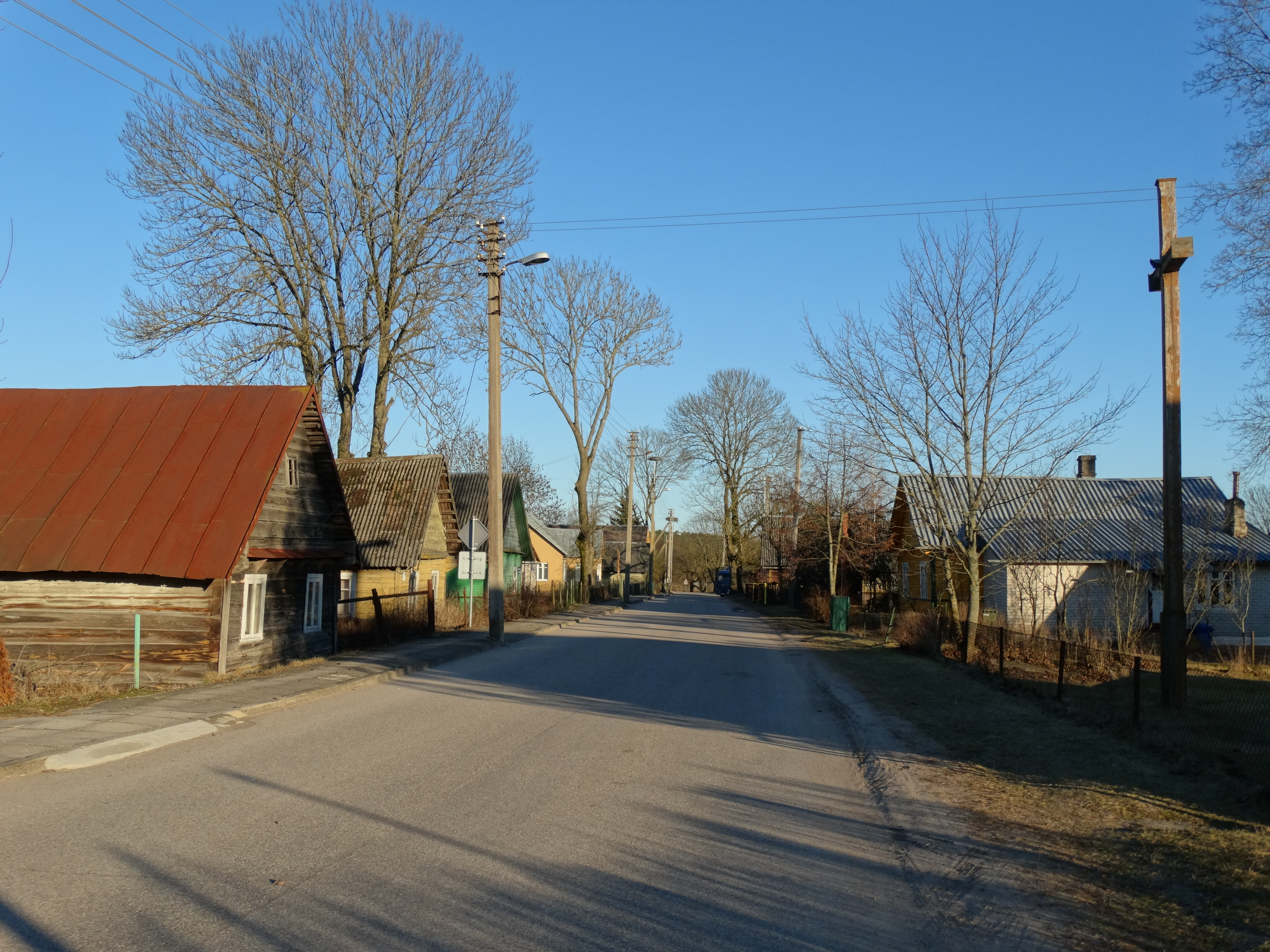
- Švendubrė

- Location in Lithuania
- Coordinates: 53°59′00″N 23°57′00″E
- Country: Lithuania
- Ethnographic region: Dzūkija
- County: Alytus County
- Municipality: Druskininkai municipality
- Elderships: Viečiūnai Eldership

Population (2021)
  - Total: 268
- Time zone: UTC+2 (EET)
  - Summer (DST): UTC+3 (EEST)

Švendubrė is a Linear settlement in Druskininkai municipality, in Alytus County, Viečiūnai Eldership, in southern Lithuania. According to the 2021 census, the village has a population of 268 people.

Švendubrė village is located c. 5.5 kilometres (3.4 mi) from Druskininkai and 900 metres (0.56 mi) from the Belarusian border.

== Architecture ==
Švendubrė is a historic street village and a protected architectural monument in Lithuania ( unique cultural heritage code 10340). During the Volok Reform, the settlement developed into a linear village with a one-sided street plan. Homesteads were arranged along the village's main streets. In the early 20th century, as farmsteads expanded, plots were subdivided and extended into previously unused land to the north. In 1972, the village street network was further extended.

The historic part of the village is characterized by farmsteads dating from the late 19th and early 20th centuries. Typical homesteads consist of two to four buildings, including one-storey residential houses constructed of wood or brick, barns, granaries, and other agricultural outbuildings arranged within elongated plots.

Švendubrė is situated on two terraces within the Raigardas Landscape Reserve. Homesteads along the main village street occupy the lower terrace, while others are located on the higher terrace. Some farmsteads in the southeastern part of the village are built on sloping terrain. The buildings typically form rectangular, polygonal, or trapezoidal courtyards. Traditional wooden and brick houses, together with wooden outbuildings, are oriented toward the village streets. During the mid-20th century, some homesteads underwent alterations, including changes to building numbers and exterior appearance. Several wooden houses were clad with silicate brick or covered with wooden boarding.
