= Raigardas =

Protected area in Lithuania

Raigardas Landscape Reserve
- IUCN category V (protected landscape/seascape)
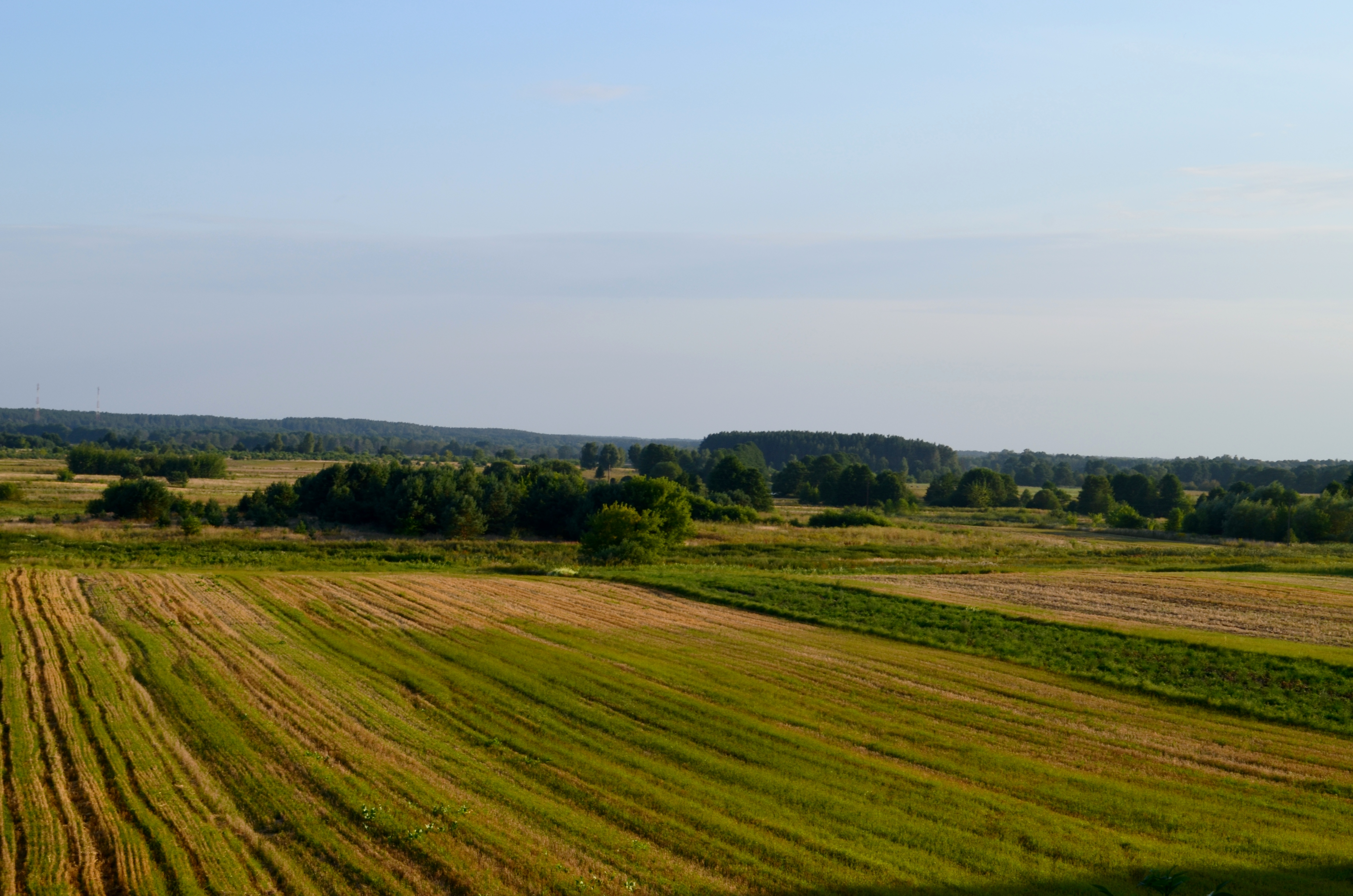
- View of the Raigardas Valley from the village of Švendubrė
- Interactive map of Raigardas Landscape Reserve
- Location: Druskininkai Municipality, Lithuania
- Nearest city: Druskininkai
- Coordinates: 53.966°N 23.963°E
- Area: 10.71 km^{2} (4.14 sq mi)
- Established: 1960

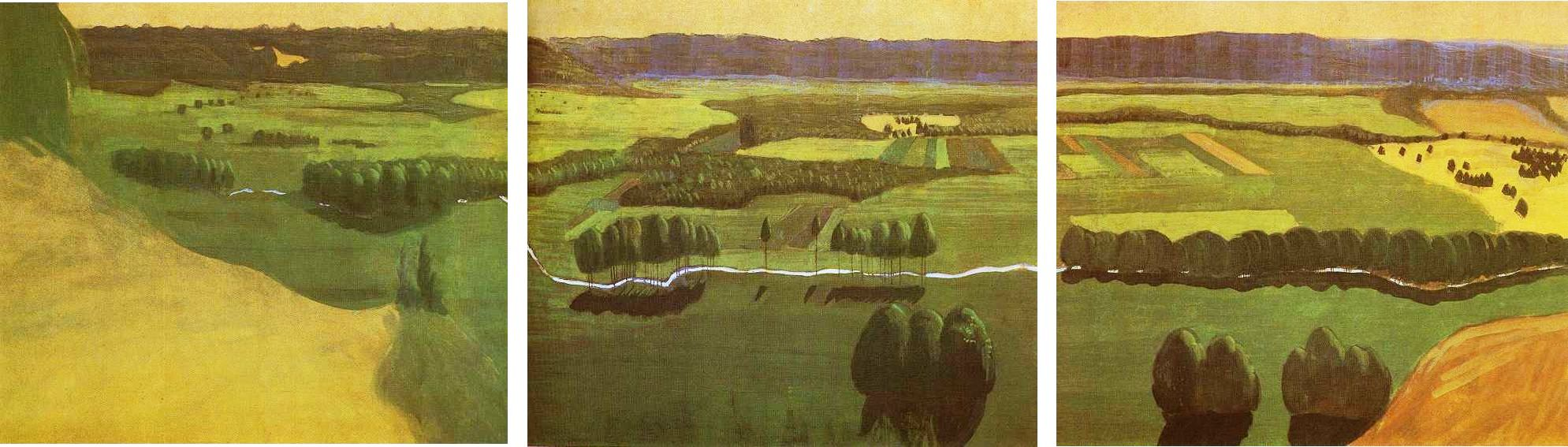
The Raigardas Valley in the triptych by M. K. Čiurlionis

Raigardas is a valley in Lithuania, located 5 km south of the resort town of Druskininkai, in Švendubrė on the right bank of the Nemunas River. A part of the valley (10.71 km²) is designated as a landscape reserve.

== Geography ==
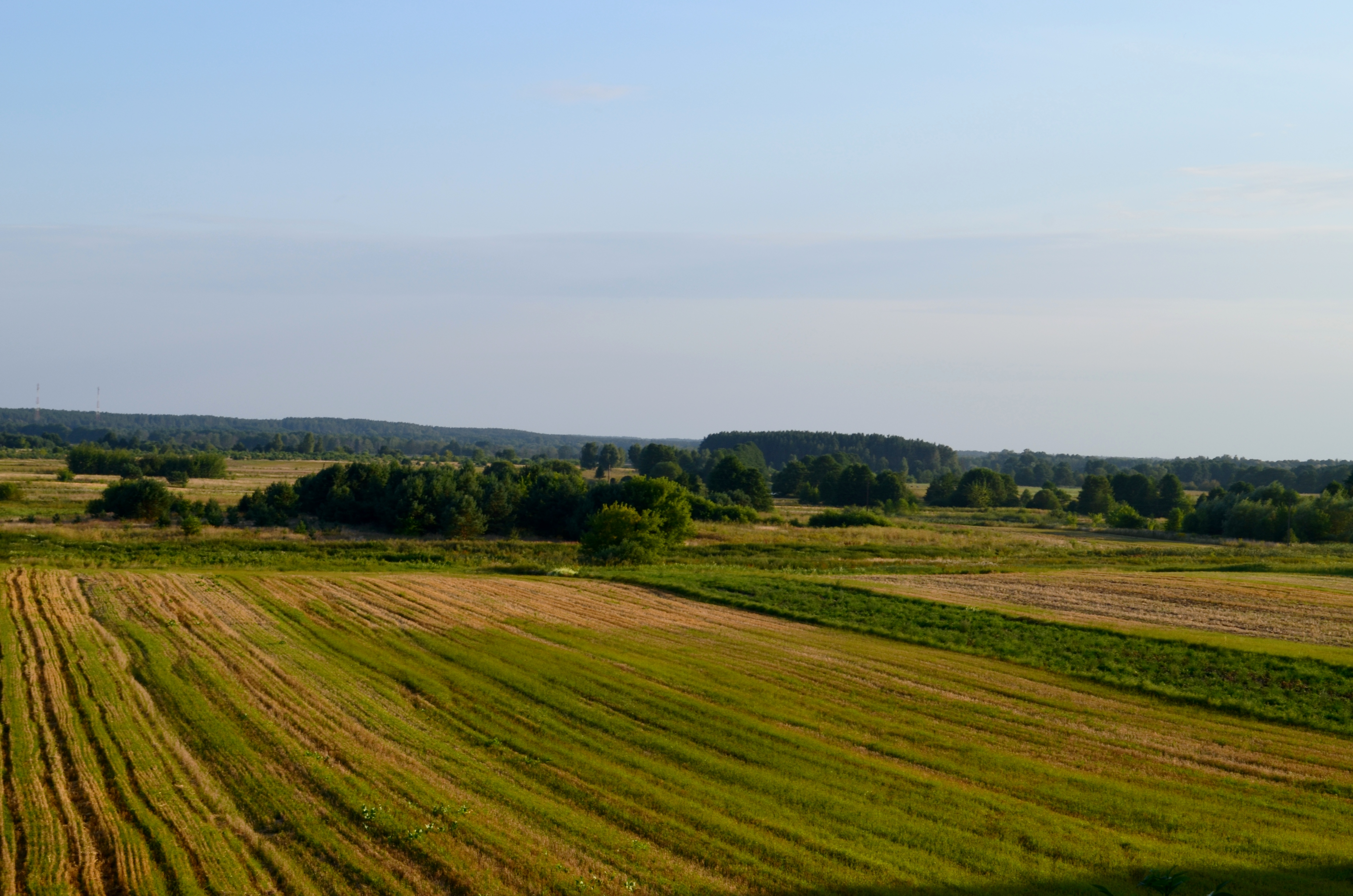
View of the Raigardas Valley from the village of Švendubrė

The Raigardas Valley is situated between the villages of Švendubrė and Pervalkas(Прывалкі) (the latter located in Belarus). The total area of the valley is approximately 14 km², with a length of 5 km from west to east and a width of up to 4 km.

The valley was formed about 5,000 years ago when a meander of the Nemunas River shifted eastward. The old riverbed left behind several oxbow lakes, two of which remain today: Lake Dvarnas near Pervalkas and Lake Nemunykštis near Švendubrė. The Kubilnyčia stream flows through the valley.

The landscape features floodplain meadows, remnants of terraces covered with pine forests, and a bog with an area of 4.26 km² (426 ha). The eastern edge and slope of the valley are part of the Raigardas Landscape Reserve. It is also home to Lithuania's largest suffosion cirque.

== Nature protection ==
The valley and its surrounding slopes are part of the Raigardas Landscape Reserve. The reserve was established in 1960 to protect the largest suffosion cirque in the country, as well as its unique geomorphological, hydrogeological, and biological complexes.

== Etymology ==
The name "Raigardas" is believed to derive from the Lithuanian words raistas ("bog", "swamp") and gardas (a borrowing from Slavic languages meaning "city", "enclosure", or "pen"). Another theory suggests it comes from raja ("quaking bog") and gardas ("enclosure", "pen").

== Legends ==
According to local folklore, a wealthy and beautiful city once stood in the location of the valley. Its inhabitants lived a life of debauchery and indulgence, which angered the thunder god Perkūnas. As punishment, the god struck the city, causing it to sink into the ground, taking all its residents with it. Legend says that the ringing of the city's cursed bells can still be heard from beneath the earth, as the souls of the sinners search for an escape they can never find.

It is believed that the exit is blocked by the "Devil's Stone", located near the village of Švendubrė. The salty mineral waters of Druskininkai are said to be the tears of the damned.

== Cultural significance ==
The picturesque Raigardas Valley was a cherished place for the renowned Lithuanian painter and composer Mikalojus Konstantinas Čiurlionis, who spent part of his childhood nearby. He often visited the valley, drawing inspiration from its landscape, and immortalized it in his famous triptych *Raigardas* (1907).

The valley is also cited in scientific studies as a prominent example of "geoheritage", where geological formations, folklore, and cultural heritage are deeply intertwined.

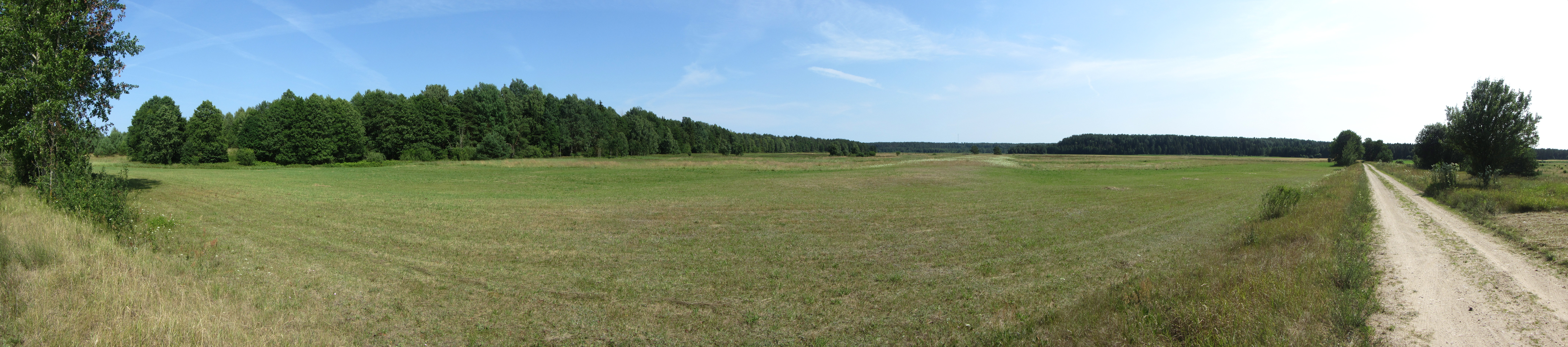
Landscape of the Raigardas Valley
