= Jaskonys =

- Village
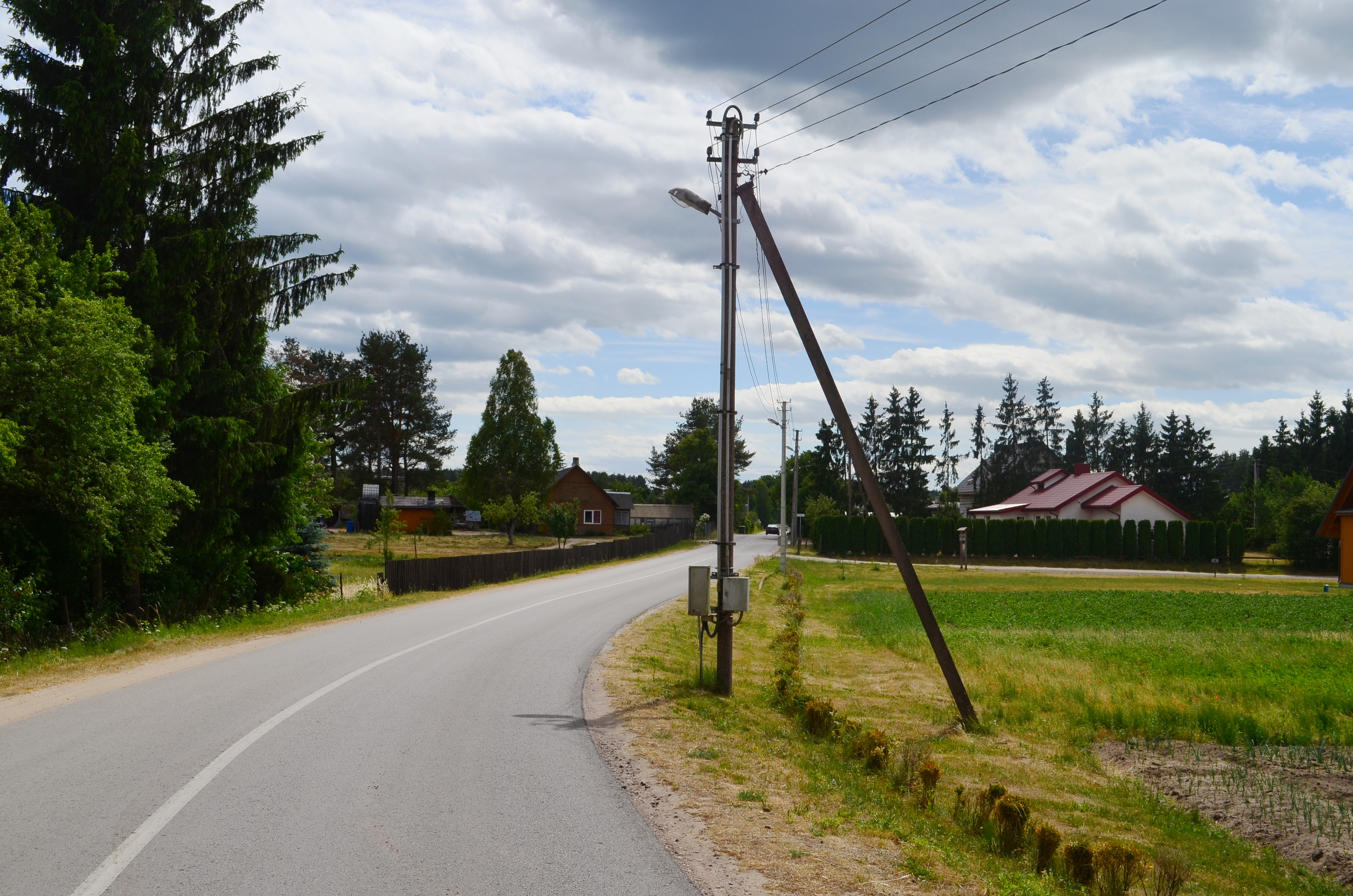
- Jaskonys

- Location in Lithuania
- Coordinates: 53°59′33″N 24°03′00″E
- Country: Lithuania
- Ethnographic region: Dzūkija
- County: Alytus County
- Municipality: Druskininkai municipality
- Elderships: Viečiūnai Eldership

Population (2021)
  - Total: 406
- Time zone: UTC+2 (EET)
  - Summer (DST): UTC+3 (EEST)

Jaskonys is a village in Druskininkai municipality, in Alytus County, in southern Lithuania. According to the 2021 census, the village has a population of 406 people.

Jaskonys village is located c. 2 kilometres (1.2 mi) from Druskininkai.
