= Gerdašiai =

- Village
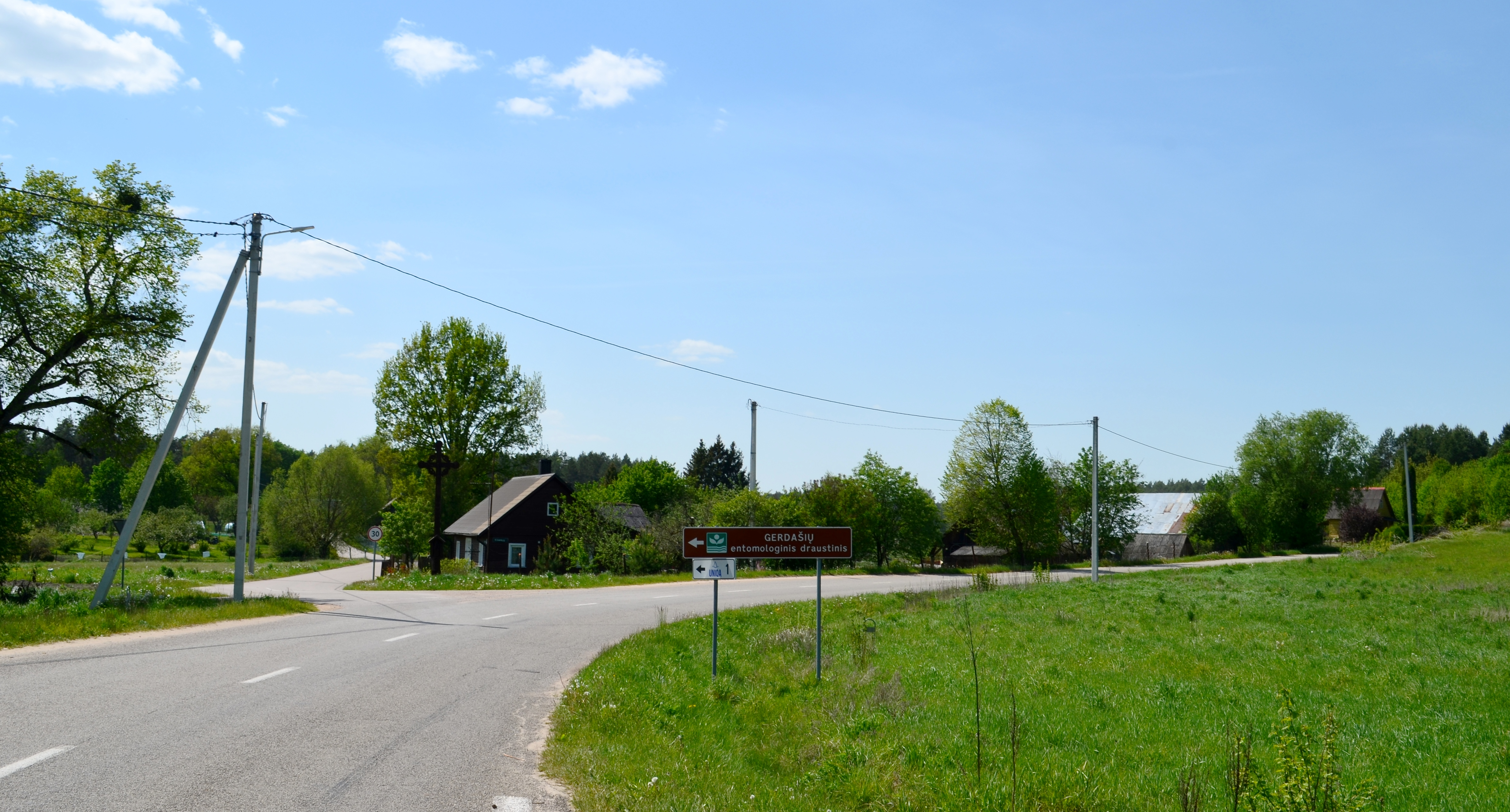
- Gerdašiai

- Location in Lithuania
- Coordinates: 53°57′22″N 23°53′38″E
- Country: Lithuania
- Ethnographic region: Dzūkija
- County: Alytus County
- Municipality: Druskininkai municipality
- Elderships: Leipalingis Eldership

Population (2021)
  - Total: 34
- Time zone: UTC+2 (EET)
  - Summer (DST): UTC+3 (EEST)

Gerdašiai is a village in Druskininkai municipality, in Alytus County, in southern Lithuania. According to the 2021 census, the village has a population of 34 people.

Gerdašiai village is located c. 12 kilometres (7.5 mi) from Druskininkai and 1 kilometre (0.62 mi) from the Belarusian border.
