= Mizarai =

- Village
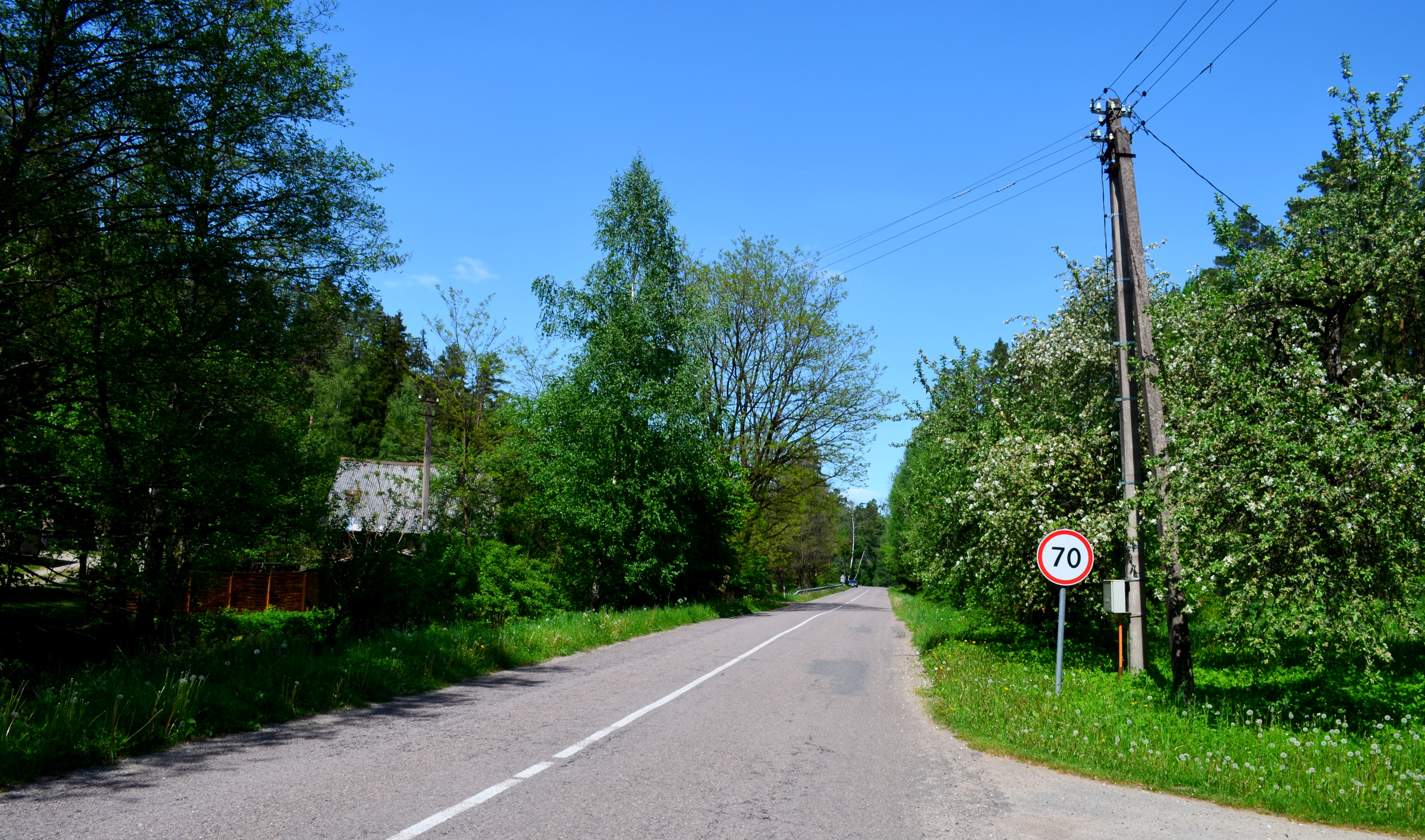
- Mizarai

- Location in Lithuania
- Coordinates: 54°02′00″N 24°00′00″E
- Country: Lithuania
- Ethnographic region: Dzūkija
- County: Alytus County
- Municipality: Druskininkai municipality
- Elderships: Leipalingis Eldership

Population (2021)
  - Total: 34
- Time zone: UTC+2 (EET)
  - Summer (DST): UTC+3 (EEST)

Mizarai is a village in Druskininkai municipality, in Alytus County, in southern Lithuania. According to the 2021 census, the village has a population of 34 people.

Mizarai village is located c. 3 kilometres (1.9 mi) from Druskininkai.
