= Gailiūnai =

- Village
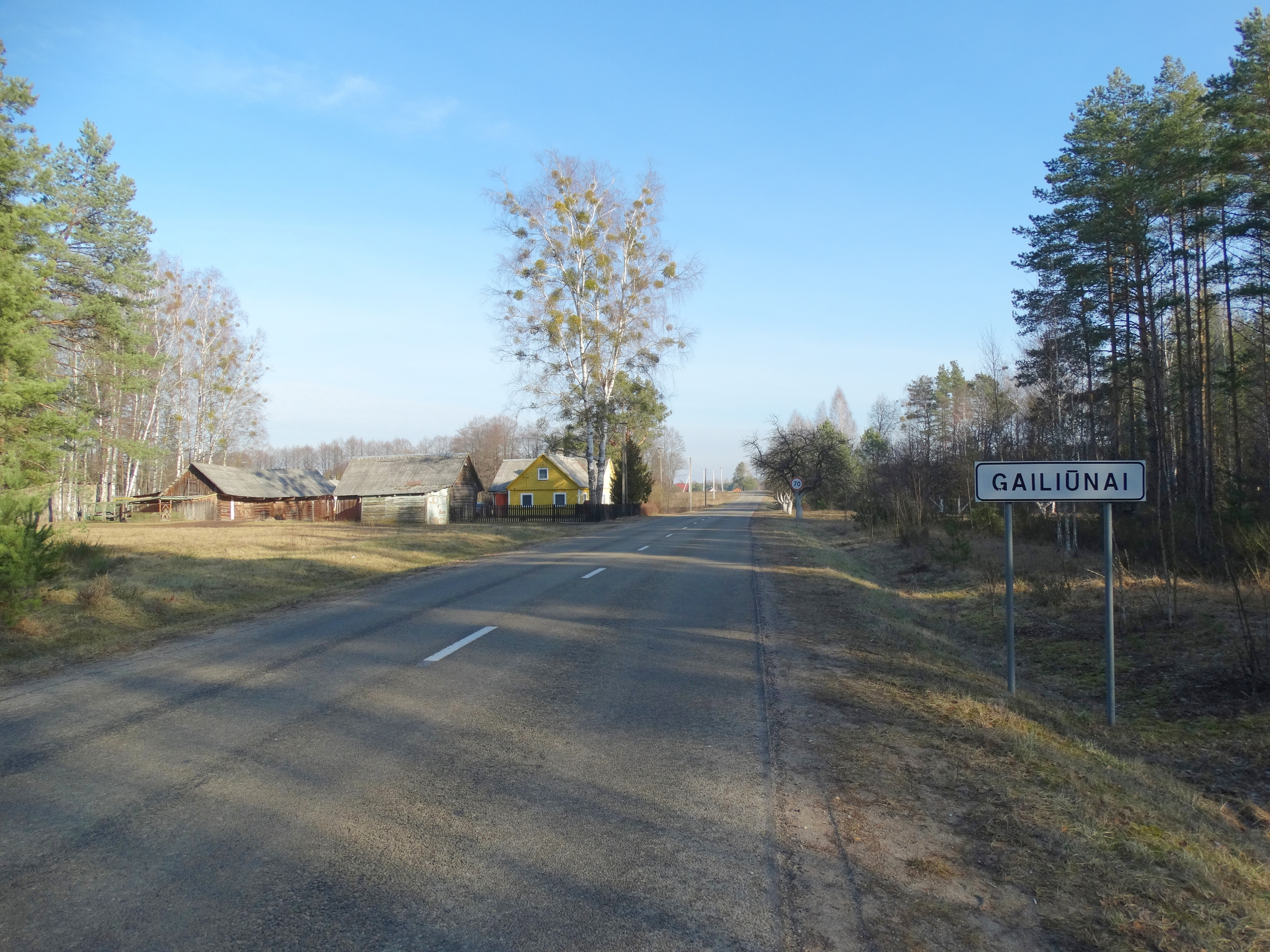
- Gailiūnai

- Location in Lithuania
- Coordinates: 54°05′0″N 24°00′00″E
- Country: Lithuania
- Ethnographic region: Dzūkija
- County: Alytus County
- Municipality: Druskininkai municipality
- Elderships: Leipalingis Eldership

Population (2021)
  - Total: 389
- Time zone: UTC+2 (EET)
  - Summer (DST): UTC+3 (EEST)

Gailiūnai is a village in Druskininkai municipality, in Alytus County, in southern Lithuania. According to the 2021 census, the village has a population of 389 people.

Gailiūnai village is located c. 2 kilometres (1.2 mi) from Druskininkai.
