= Druskininkai Aquapark =

Water park in Lithuania

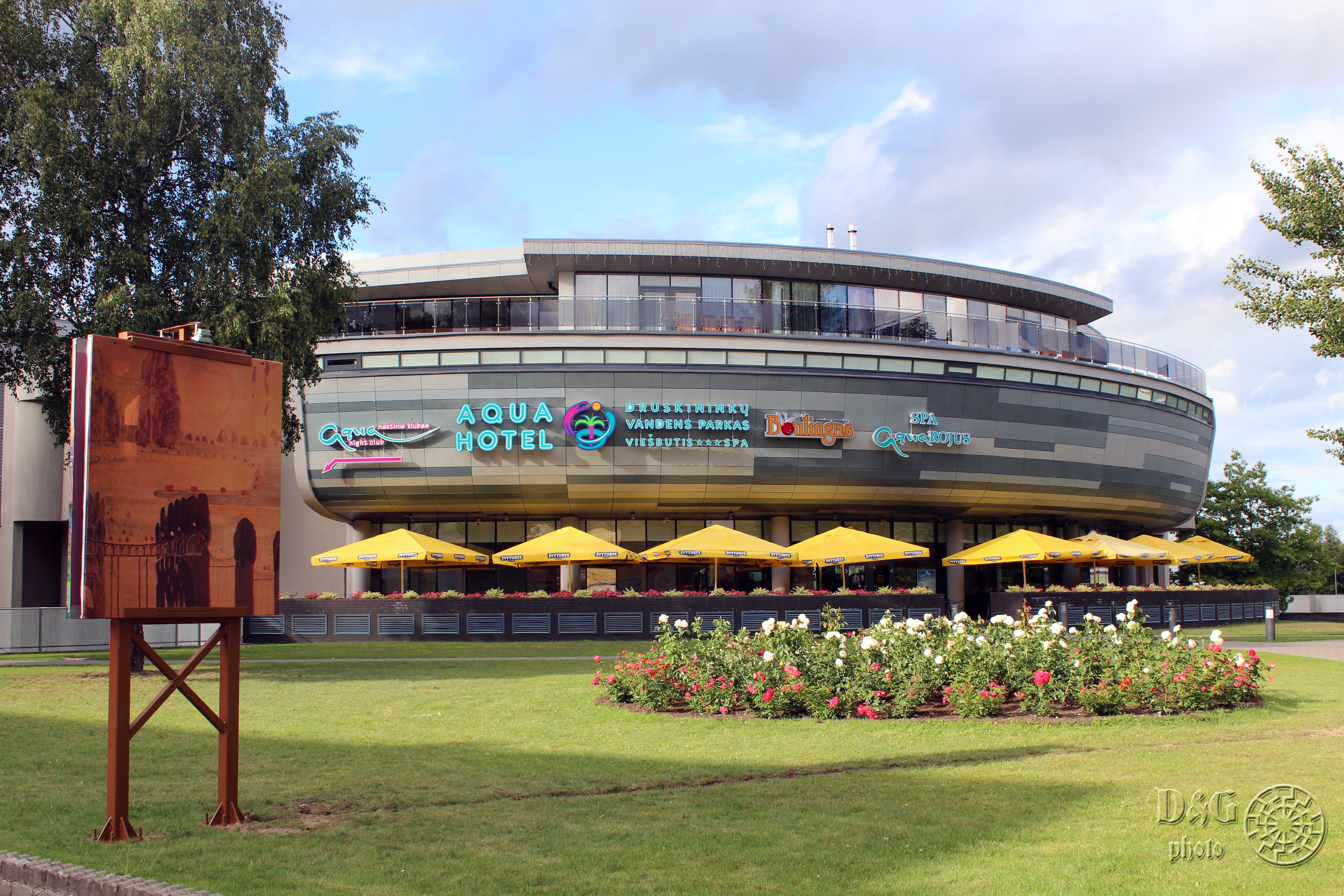
- Interactive map of Druskininkai Aquapark
- Location: Druskininkai, Druskininkai Municipality, Lithuania
- Coordinates: 54°01′22″N 23°58′20″E
- Opened: 26 December 2006
- Status: Operating
- Area: 30,000 m2
- Pools: 4 pools
- Water slides: 5 water slides
- Website: https://www.akvapark.lt/vandens-parkas/

Druskininkai Aquapark (Lithuanian: Druskininkų vandens parkas) is a water park in Druskininkai in the Druskininkai Municipality of Lithuania. It is the oldest water park in Lithuania.

== History ==
In Druskininkai in 2004 At the beginning of December, the reconstruction of the former physiotherapy clinic into the Druskininkai Aquapark began, and on December 26, 2006, Druskininkai Aquapark was opened in its place.In February 2026, a large-scale reconstruction began.

== Attractions ==
Druskininkai Aquapark has 5 water slides and 19 different saunas.

=== Druskininkai Aquapark water slides ===
Name (en)	Name (lt)	Length (m)	Min. Age	Notes
Bermuda (demolished)	Bermudai	212	12	Longest water slide in Lithuania (before July 2026)
Extreme (demolished)	Ekstremalus	150	13	
Ardor	Azartas	107	10	
Adrenaline (demolished)	Adrenalinas	80	13	
Flow	Srautas	80	8	
Whirlpool	Sūkurys	40	13	
Frenzy	Šėlsmas	203	12	
Cruise	Kruizas	210	13	Longest Slide in Lithuania (At the moment)
