= Joy of All Who Sorrow Church =

Joy of All Who Sorrow Church may refer to:

- Joy of All Who Sorrow Church, Druskininkai, Lithuania
- Joy of All Who Sorrow Church, Koterka, Poland
