= Neravai =

Coordinates: 54°02′10″N 24°01′30″E

- Village
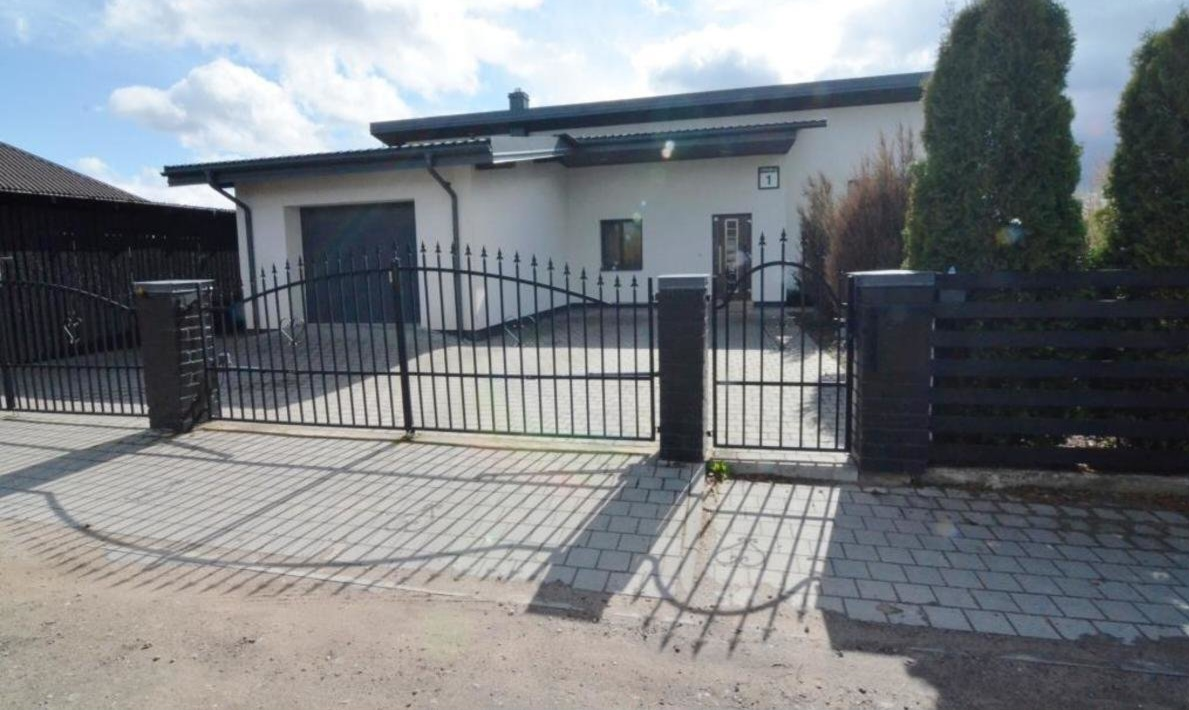
- Neravai, Jotvingių street
- Interactive map of Neravai
- Country: Lithuania
- County: Alytus County
- Municipality: Druskininkai

Population (2021)
  - Total: 1,124
- Time zone: UTC+2 (EET)
  - Summer (DST): UTC+3 (EEST)

Neravai is a village in Druskininkai municipality, in Alytus County, in south Lithuania. It is de facto a suburb of Druskininkai city.
