= Kermušija =

Coordinates: 53°59′20″N 24°05′49″E

- Village
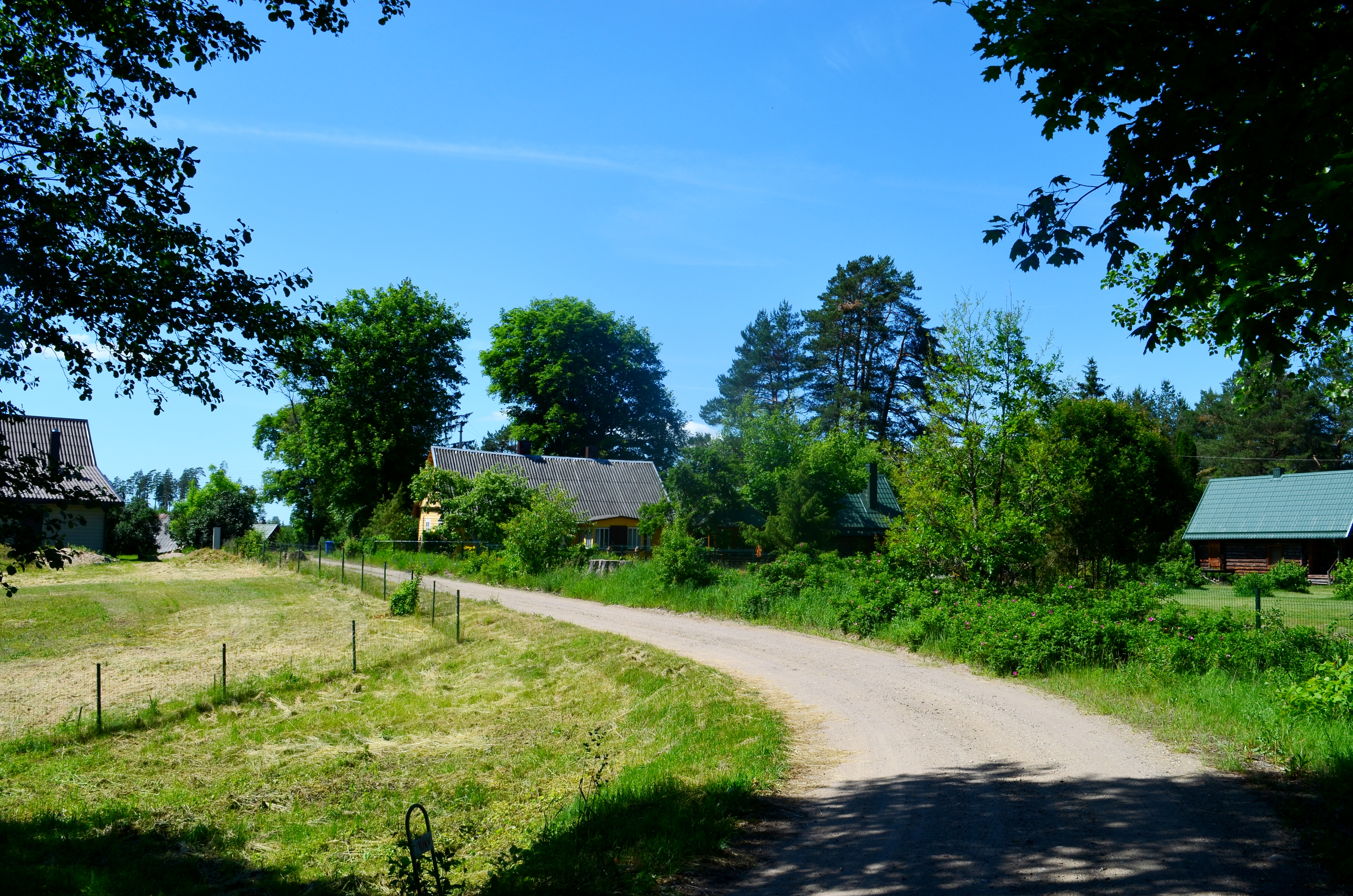
- Interactive map of Kermušija
- Country: Lithuania
- County: Alytus County
- Municipality: Druskininkai Municipality

Population (2021)
  - Total: 17
- Time zone: UTC+2 (EET)
  - Summer (DST): UTC+3 (EEST)

Kermušija is a village in Druskininkai Municipality, in Alytus County, in south Lithuania. According to the 2021 census, the village has a population of 17 people.

Kermušija village is located about 7 kilometres (4.3 mi) from Druskininkai and 1 kilometre (0.62 mi) from Latežeris (the nearest settlement).
