= Shmaryahu Yitzchak Bloch =

Rabbi Shmaryahu Yitzchak Bloch (1864 – December 1923) was a rabbi and Talmudist in Tsarist Russia and England.

== Biography ==
There is very scant information about Rabbi Bloch's life. He was born in Kretinga, a shtetl now in Klaipėda County, Lithuania. It is known that Rabbi Bloch served as rabbi of Druskenik from 1884 until his emigration to England in 1888, and subsequently served as a rabbi in the communities of Sunderland, Birmingham, Stamford Hill and Leeds, where he died in December 1923 (Hebrew date: 7 Teves 5684).

Rabbi Bloch was also an examiner for many years at the Etz Chaim yeshiva in London. He gave an approbation to the Sefer Doresh Tov L'amo authored by Rabbi Mordechai Tzvi Schwartz and published in London in 1917.

Upon his sudden death, the Jewish Chronicle wrote that Rabbi Bloch was a

"Staunch champion of Orthodoxy... Even his most casual acquaintance must have been struck by his love - nay, his passion - for the Talmud. Possessed of a prodigious memory and of a zeal for study almost without parallel, he acquired so accurate a knowledge of the whole of the Talmud and the glosses thereon that his Bekius [extensively wide knowledge] became proverbial. His mind was a veritable treasure-house of Rabbinic lore. No concordance was so reliable a guide. His piety was remarkable... he dug wells of learning wherever he sojourned... a pioneer in the establishment of Talmud Torah's and Yeshiboth."
