= Viečiūnai =

- Town
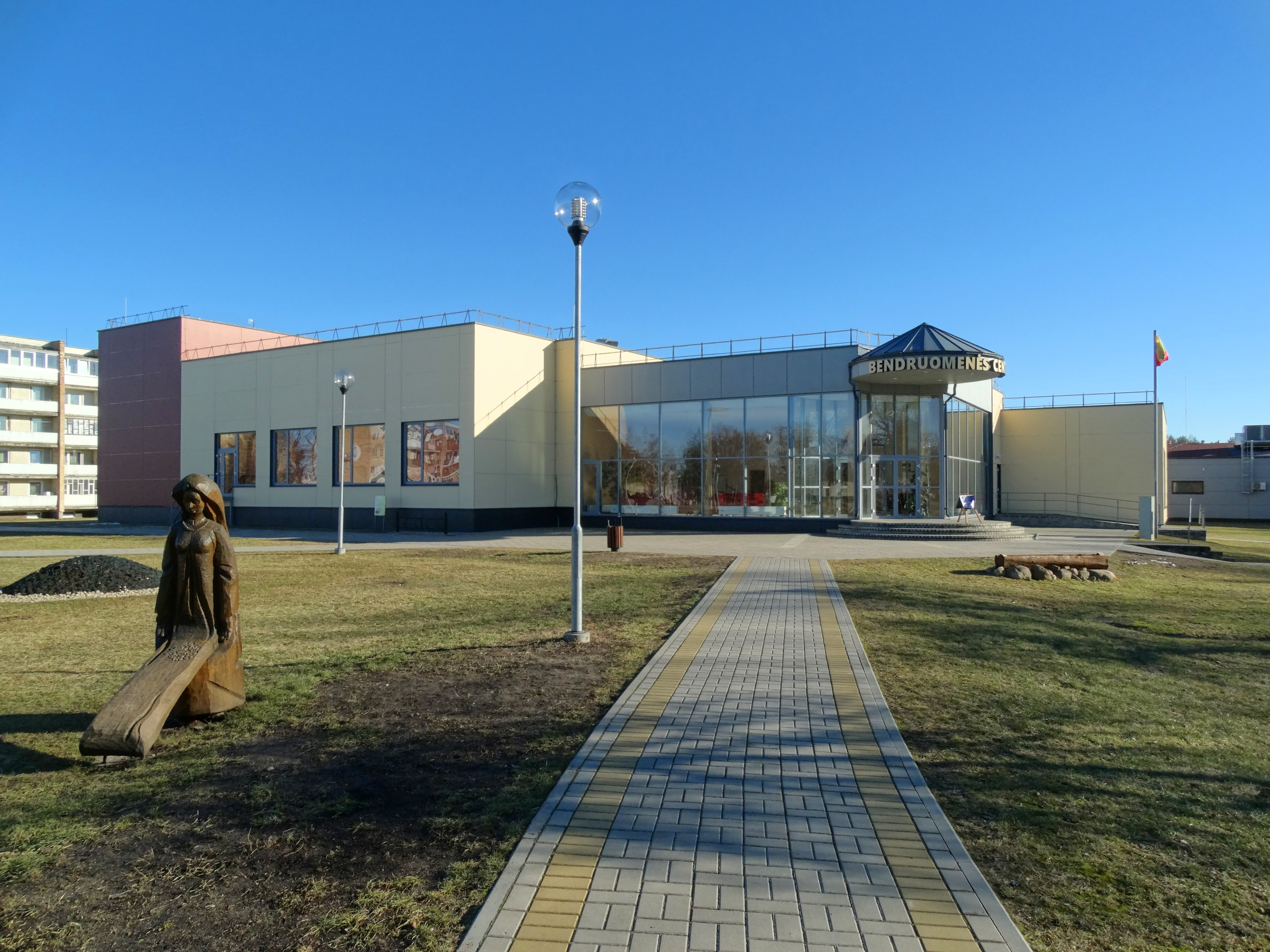
- Viečiūnai community centre

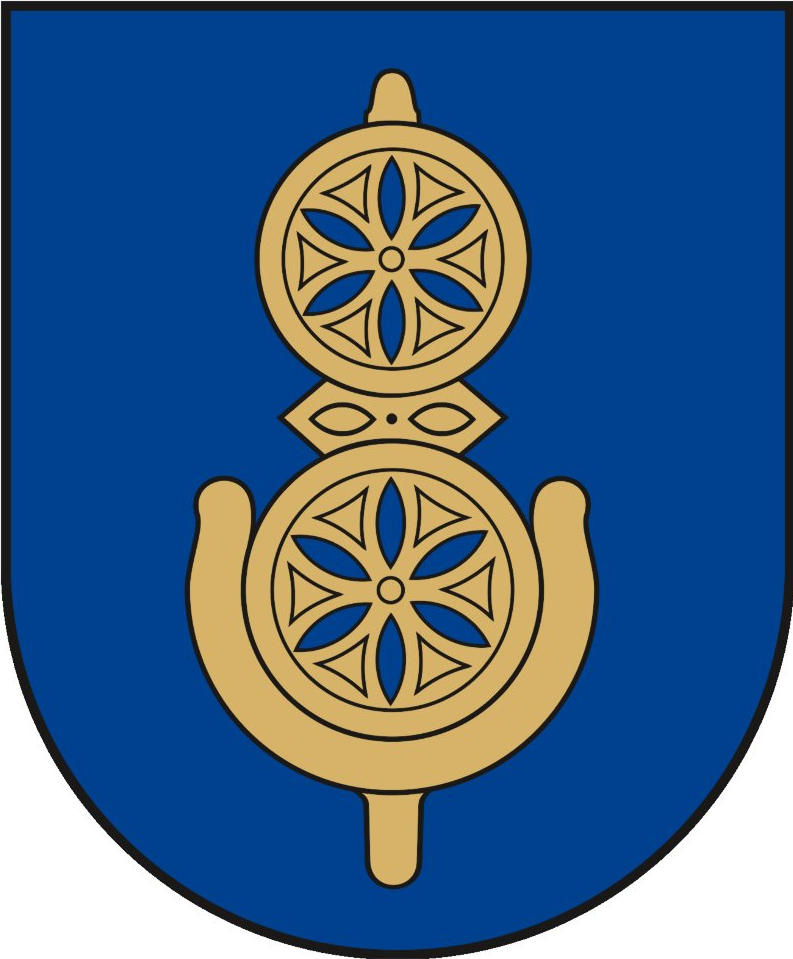
- Coat of arms

- Location in Lithuania
- Coordinates: 54°03′40″N 24°03′24″E
- Country: Lithuania
- Ethnographic region: Dzūkija
- County: Alytus County
- Municipality: Druskininkai municipality
- Eldership: Viečiūnai Eldership
- Capital of: Viečiūnai Eldership

Population (2021)
  - Total: 1,788
- Time zone: UTC+2 (EET)
  - Summer (DST): UTC+3 (EEST)

Viečiūnai is a small town in Alytus County in southern Lithuania. In 2021 it had a population of 1,788.
