= Latežeris =

- Village
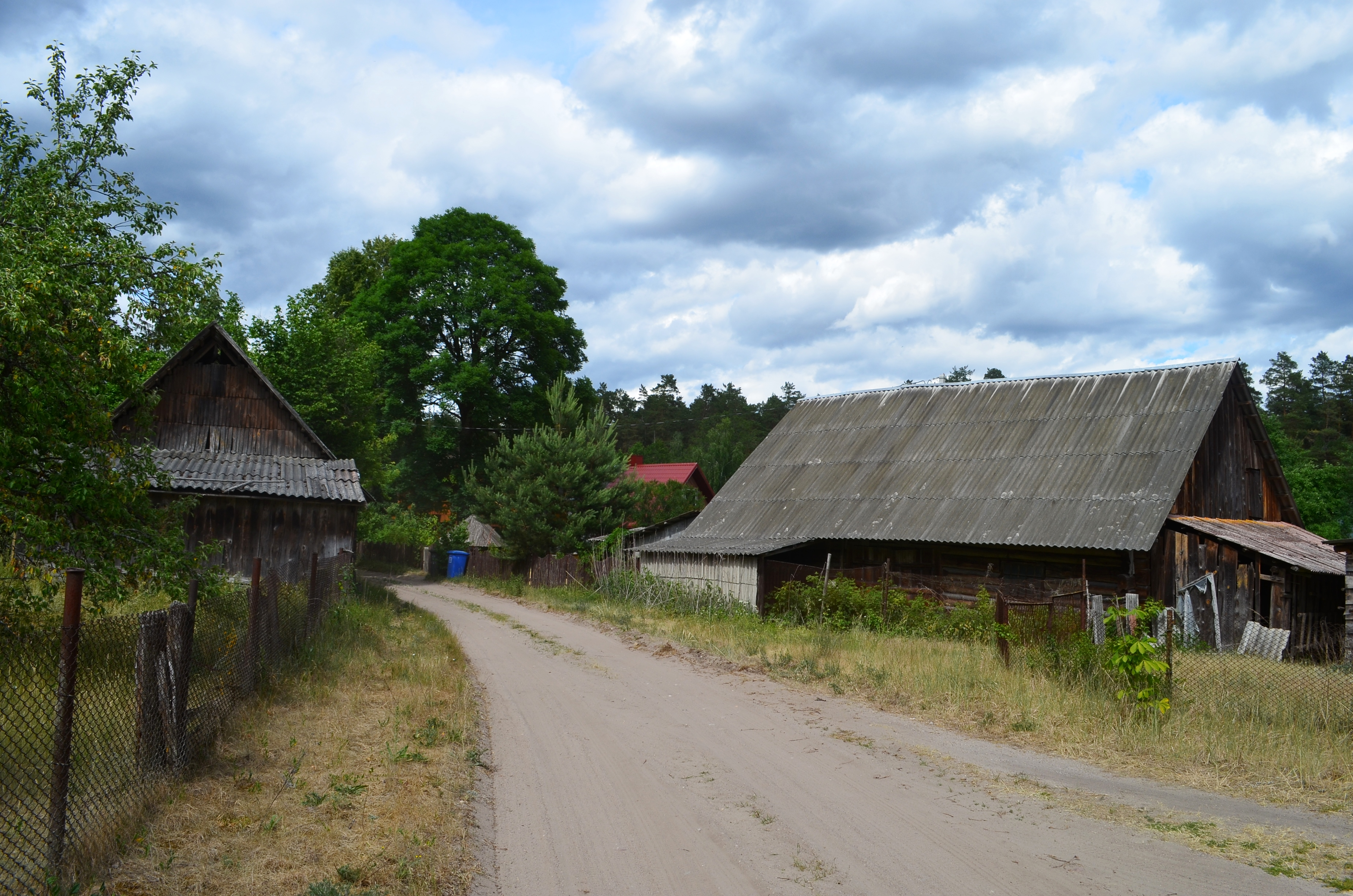

- Location within Lithuania
- Country: Lithuania
- County: Alytus County
- Municipality: Druskininkai

Population (2021)
  - Total: 47
- Time zone: UTC+2 (EET)
  - Summer (DST): UTC+3 (EEST)

Latežeris is a village in Druskininkai municipality, in Alytus County, in south Lithuania. According to the 2011 census, the village has a population of 35 people.

Latažeris village is located c. 6 kilometres (3.7 mi) from Druskininkai, 1 kilometre (0.62 mi) from Kermušija (the nearest settlement).

== Demographics ==
Historical population

Year	Pop.	±%
1959	66	—
1979	57	−13.6%
1989	45	−21.1%

Year	Pop.	±%
2001	32	−28.9%
2011	35	+9.4%
2021	47	+34.3%

Source: 1959, 1979, 1989, 2001, 2011 2021
