= Leipalingis =

- Town
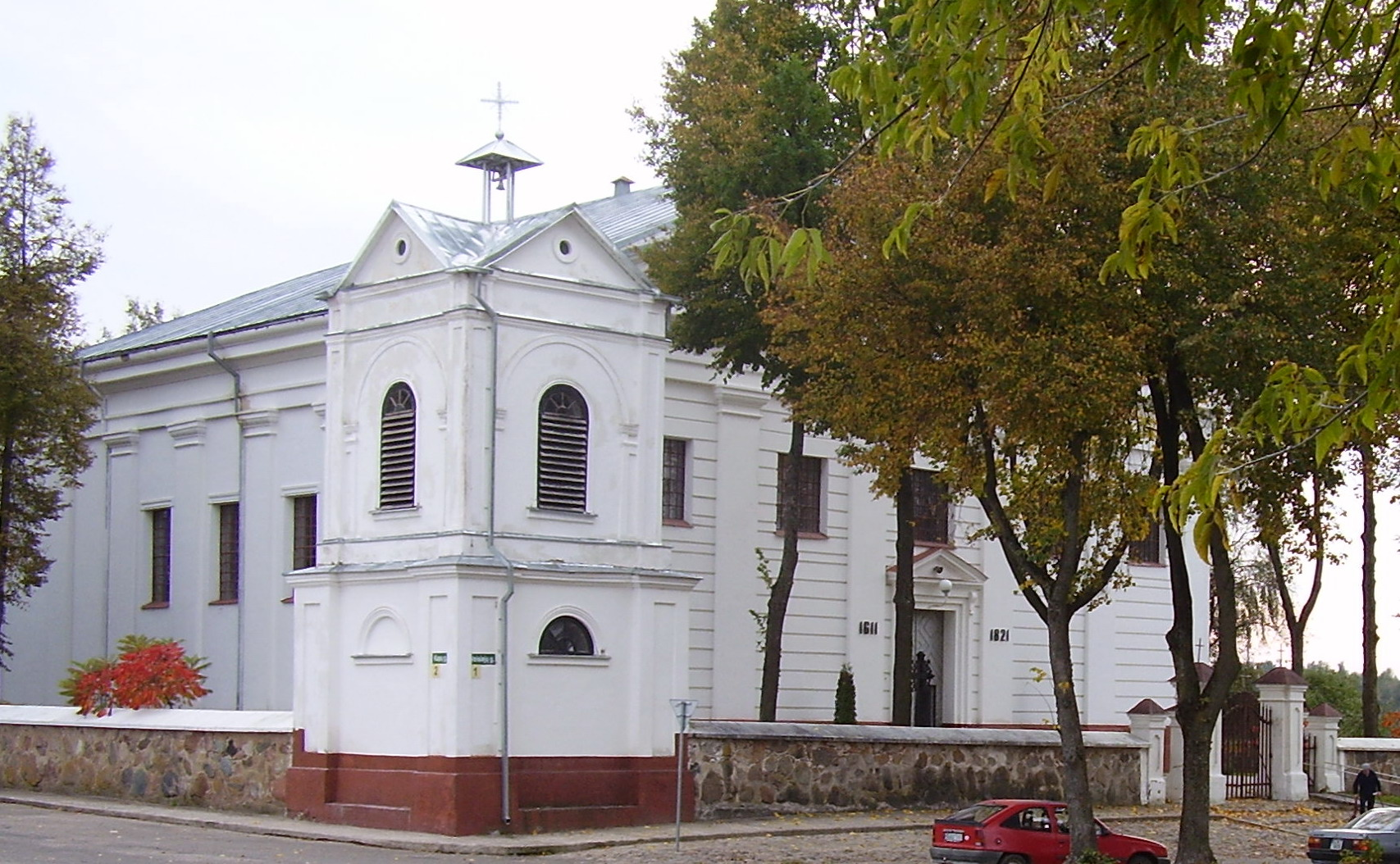

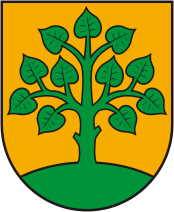
- Coat of arms

- Location in Lithuania
- Coordinates: 54°05′10″N 23°51′40″E
- Country: Lithuania
- Ethnographic region: Dzūkija
- County: Alytus County
- Municipality: Druskininkai municipality
- Eldership: Leipalingis Eldership
- Capital of: Leipalingis Eldership

Population (2021)
  - Total: 1,469
- Time zone: UTC+2 (EET)
  - Summer (DST): UTC+3 (EEST)

Leipalingis (Yiddish: לײפּון) is a small town in Alytus County in southern Lithuania. In 2011 it had a population of 1,552.

== Etymology ==
Leipalingis is located in the ancient lands of Baltic tribe Yotvingians, so the name contains Yotwingian form of word liepa - leipa (linden).

== History ==
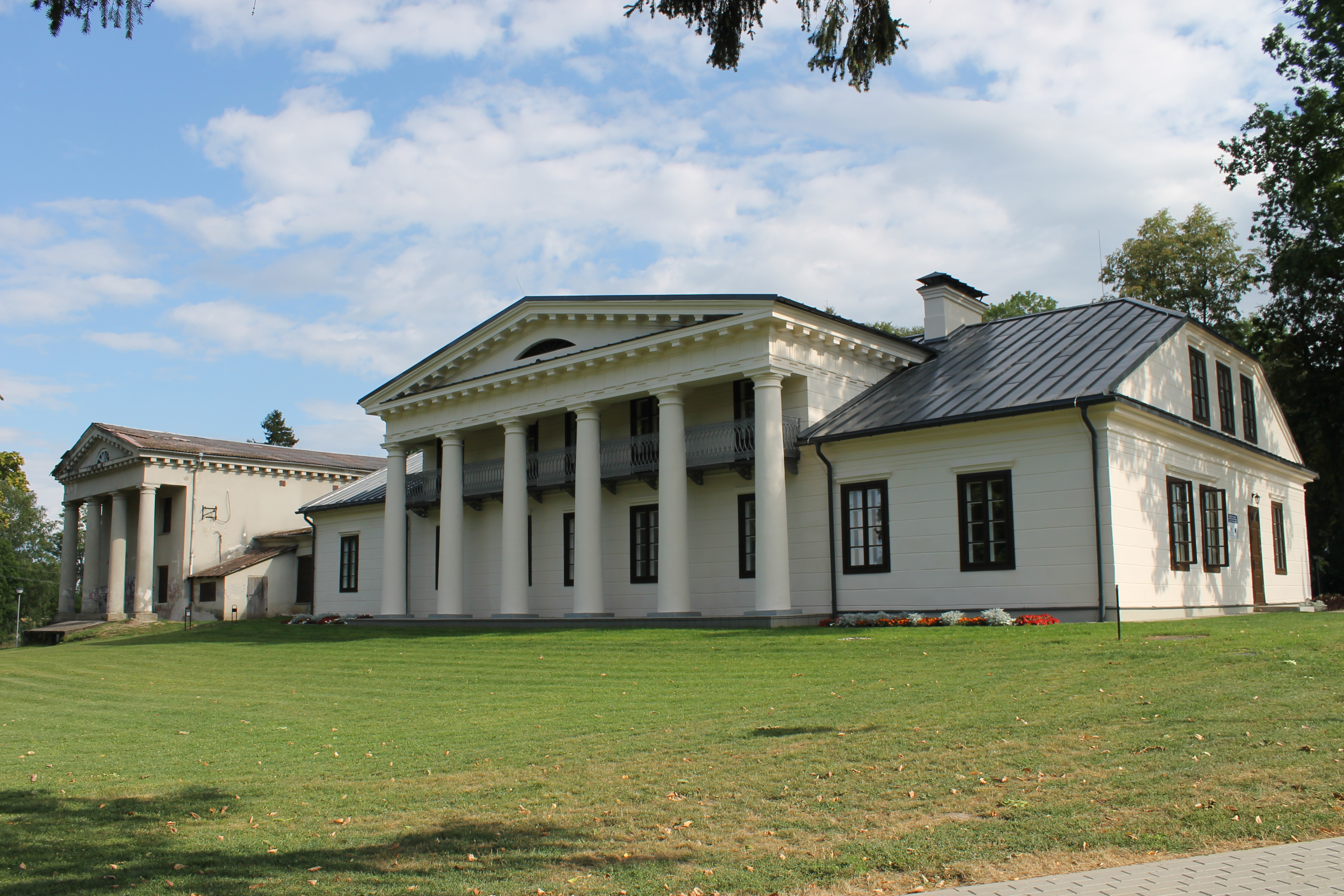
Leipalingis manor, built in 1830, architect Marcin Knackfus

1.5 km south of Leipalingis is Černiauskas mound, 2 km southwest - Druskininkiai mound. In the western part of Leipalingis, to the west of Seira river right bank is archeological Leipalingis cemetery. Therefore, the area, which was destroyed by crusaders before the second half of the 13th century, could have a defensive meaning.

The Leipalingis Manor is first mentioned in 1503, the town itself, later known for some time as Lepunikai - in 1516.

From the sixteenth century Leipalingis belonged to orthodox Sapieha family, who in 1520 built an orthodox church. Later they became Catholics and built the first catholic church. After Sapiehas, Leipalingis belonged to Masalskiai and from the end of the 18th century - to Plateriai families.

During 1654-1667 war the town was burned down. In 1818-1950 it became a district of the municipality. Next to the Leipalingis Manor operated an iron foundry. At the end of the 19th century, Leipalingis became an important junction between the roads connecting Seinai with Seirijai and Merkinė.

Around 1817 a parish school was established, and in 1906 a library. On 11 September 1941, on the orders of the Nazi occupation authorities, 155 people belonging to a local Jewish community were executed. The town suffered greatly during the Second World War.

After the Soviet occupation of Lithuania, the Soviet authorities deported 51 inhabitants of the town to Siberia. Leipalingis and its surroundings was one of the centers of the Lithuanian resistance movement against the Soviet occupation. Leipalingis belong to Dainava military district, Šarūnas' detachment. After restoring the independence of Lithuania, in 1991, bodies of 47 executed Lithuanian partisans were found in the yard of former NKVD headquarters of Leipalingis.

1950–1995 in Leipalingis operated a collective farm, a sewing workshop "Baltija", a rural outpatient center, a shopping center. In town currently operates a nursery-kindergarten "Liepaitė", a sewing workshop, a forest district.

Leipalingis coat of arms was approved in 2003.
