= Leipalingis Manor =

Coordinates: 54°5′54″N 23°51′37″E

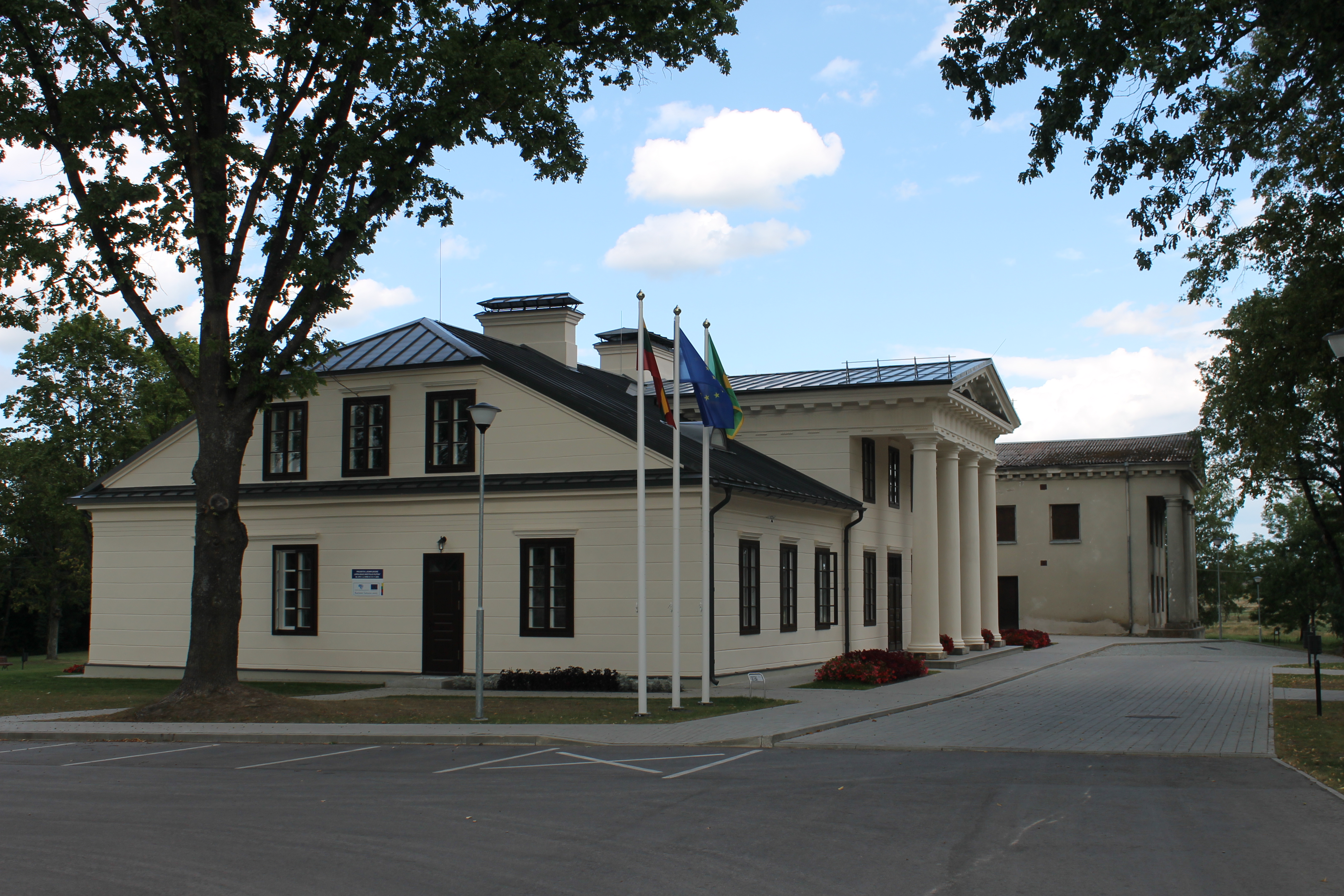
Leipalingis manor, Druskininkai municipality, Lithuania

Leipalingis Manor was a residential manor in Leipalingis, Lithuania. Only oficina remained until nowadays.
