= Ratnyčia (river) =

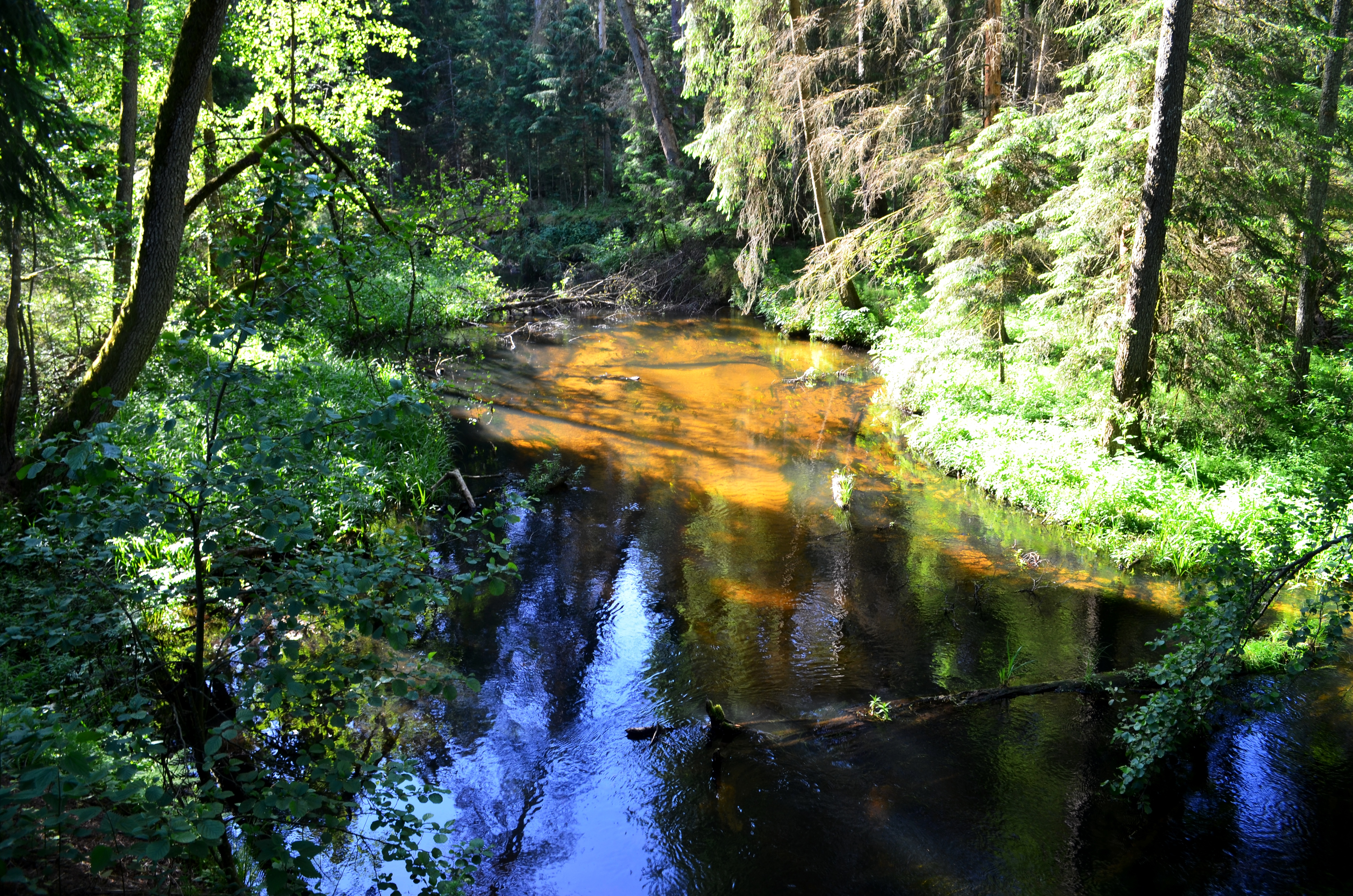
- river near Kermušija village

Location
- Country: Lithuania

Physical characteristics
- Mouth: Neman
  - coordinates: 54°1′N 23°58′E
- Length: 33 km (21 mi)
- Basin size: 172 km^{2} (66 sq mi)
- Discharge
  - average: 1.31 m^{3}/s (46 cu ft/s)

Ratnyčia is a river in southern Lithuania.

It begins near the state border of Lithuania and Belarus, in the Dainava Forest, in a swamp.
