= Joy of All Who Sorrow Church, Druskininkai =

Church building in Lithuania

Coordinates: 54°01′16″N 23°58′16″E

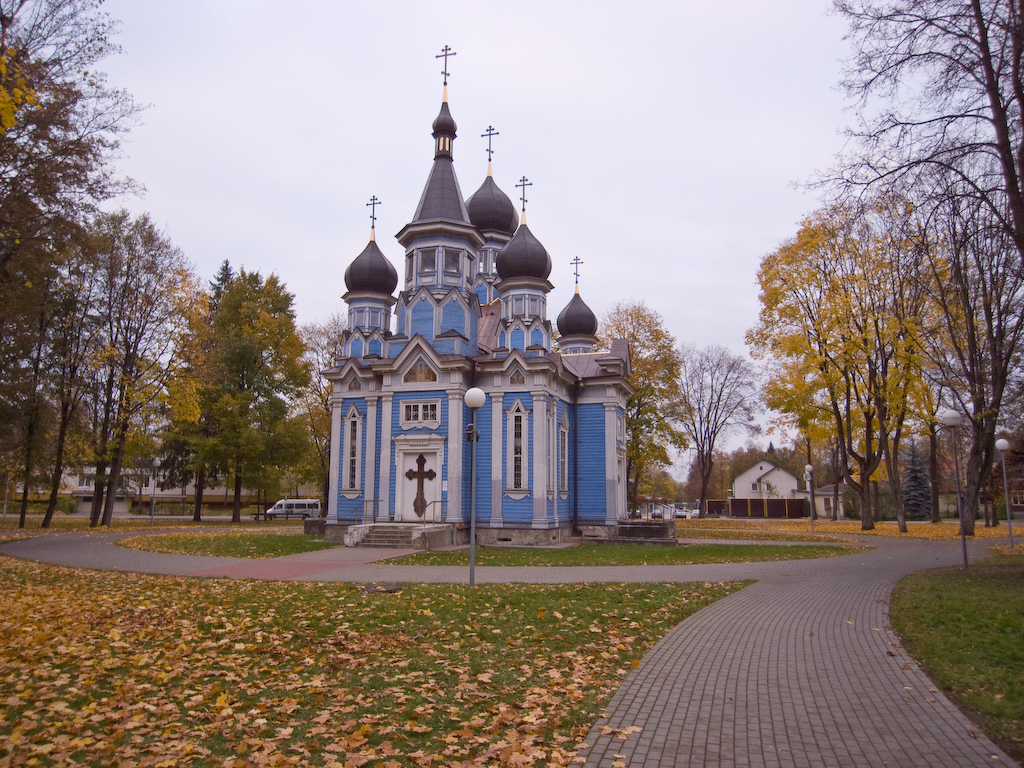
The exterior

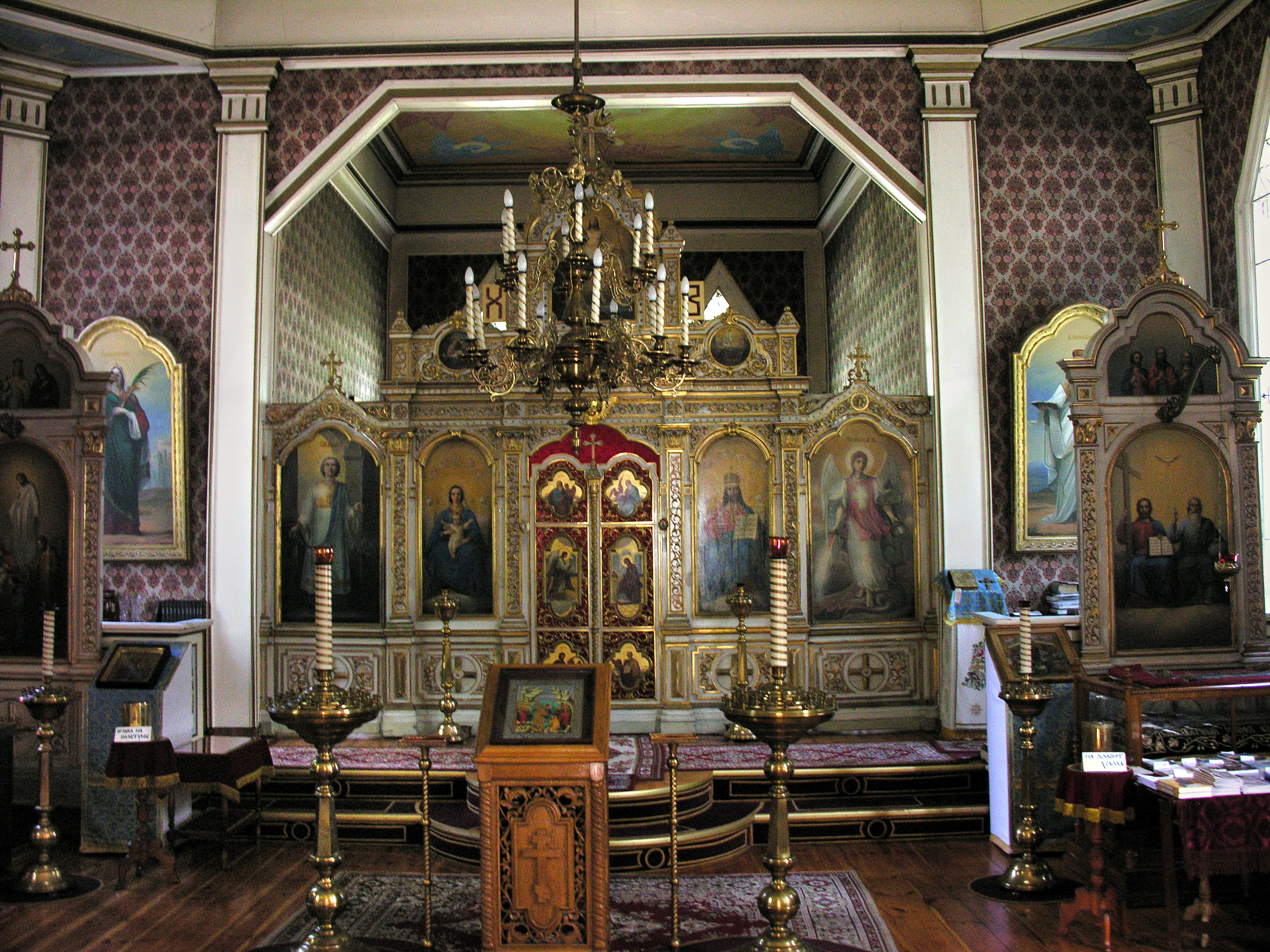
The interior

Joy of all who Sorrow Church is an Eastern Orthodox church in Druskininkai, Lithuania, belonging to the Russian Orthodox Diocese of Lithuania.. It is dedicated to the icon of the Joy of All Who Sorrow.

The church was built in 1865, after Druskininkai become a highly popular spa town visited by many wealthy Russians. The vice-governor of Grodno, Yakov Rozhnov, announced a collection of funds in the whole country. Among the contributors, there was the granddaughter of general Mikhail Ilarionovich Kutuzov, Iekaterina, who offered the sum needed for the construction of the iconostasis. Rozhnov himself also donated ten thousand rubles. The church was built between 1861 and 1865. Up from 1890, the Orthodox parish in Druskininkai also ran a school for girls of different confessions.

In 1915, when World War I started, most of the Russian Orthodox inhabitants of Druskininkai left the town. However, after the Vilnius region was annexed by Poland, the town - and so the parish - become a local center of White Russian emigration. Because of that, the church was closed in 1944, after Red Army entered Druskininkai. At this time there was around 350 Orthodox Christians in Druskininkai and the Soviet government agreed to reopen the parish in 1947. In addition, ten years later, the church was renovated. It still houses a parish, although the number of the parishioners has been falling since the 1970s.

== Sources ==
- G. Shlevis, Православные храмы Литвы, Свято-Духов Монастыр, Vilnius 2006, ISBN 9986-559-62-6
