= Viečiūnai Eldership =

Viečiūnai Eldership Viečiūnų seniūnija
- Eldership
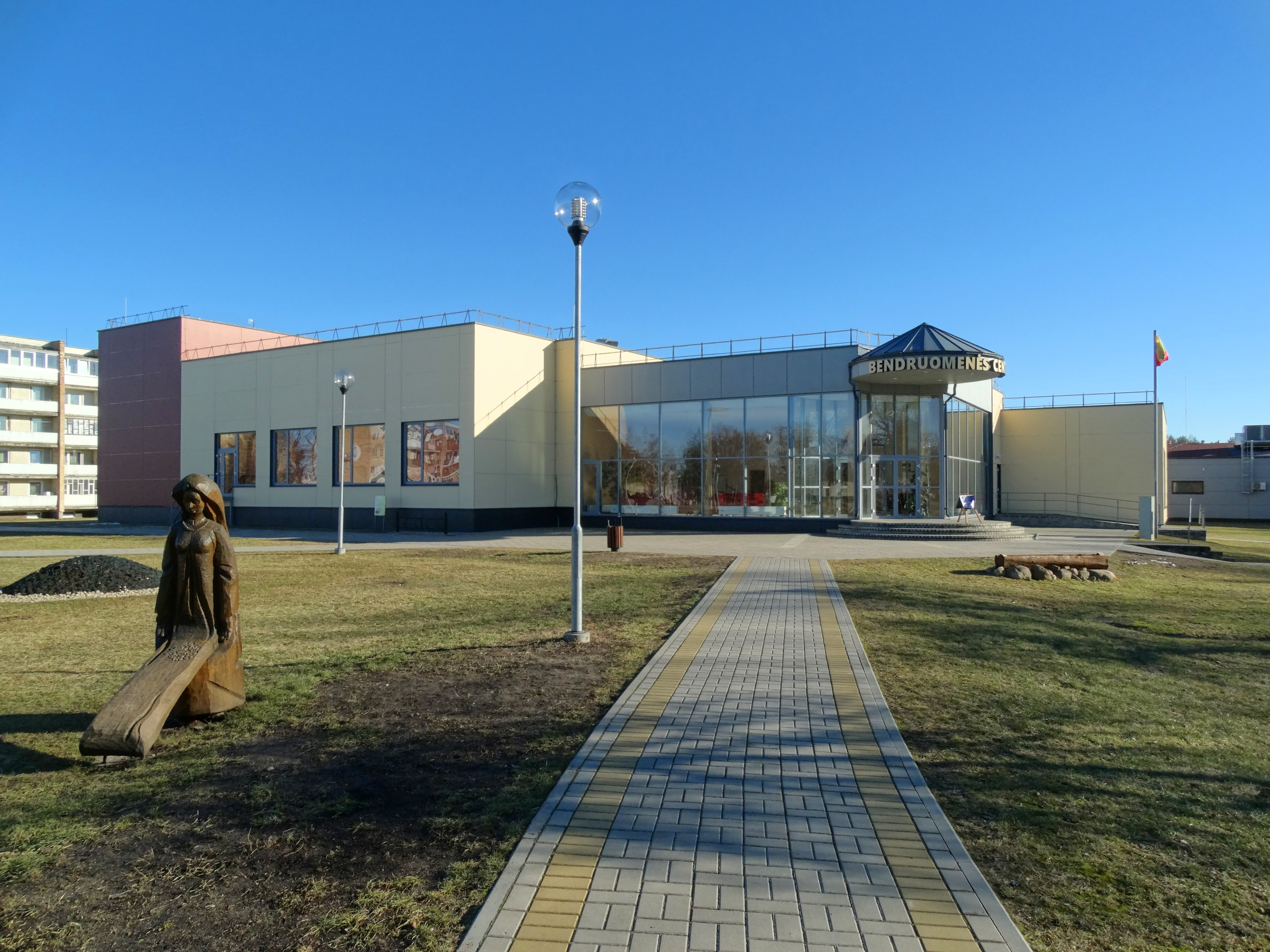
- Viečiūnai, the only town in the eldership

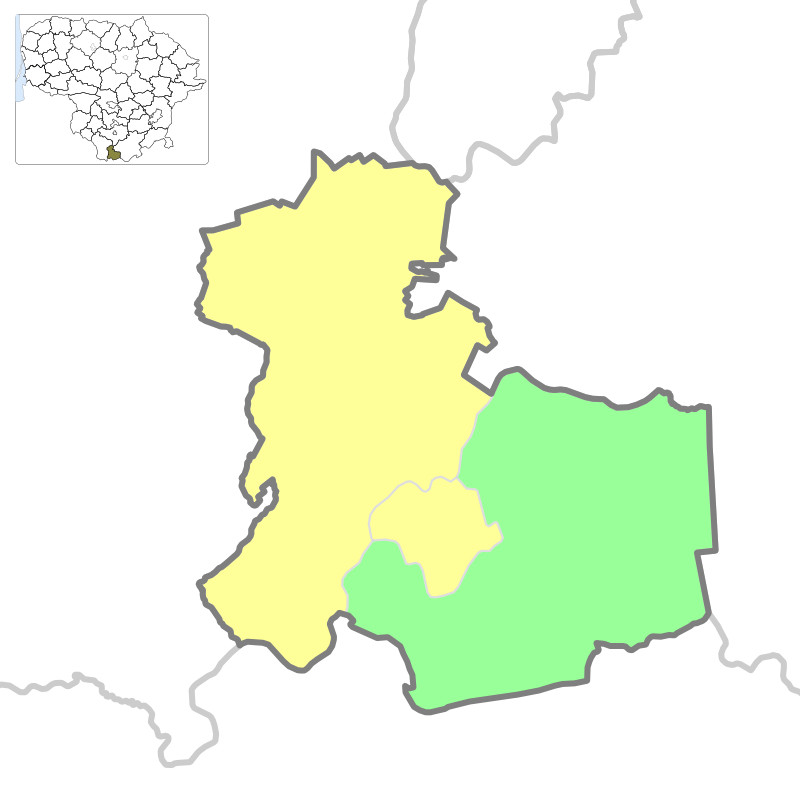
- Location of Viečiūnai Eldership
- Country: Lithuania
- Ethnographic region: Dzūkija
- County: Alytus County
- Municipality: Druskininkai Municipality
- Administrative centre: Viečiūnai

Area
  - Total: 188 km^{2} (73 sq mi)

Population (2021)
  - Total: 3,998
  - Density: 21.3/km^{2} (55.1/sq mi)
- Time zone: UTC+2 (EET)
  - Summer (DST): UTC+3 (EEST)

Viečiūnai Eldership (Lithuanian: Viečiūnų seniūnija) is a Lithuanian eldership, located in the eastern part of Druskininkai Municipality.

== Geography ==
Viečiūnai Eldership is mostly covered by the Dainava Forest.

- Rivers: Neman.
- Lakes and ponds: Latažeris (lake).
- Forests: Dainava Forest.
