= Leipalingis Eldership =

Leipalingis Eldership Leipalingio seniūnija
- Eldership
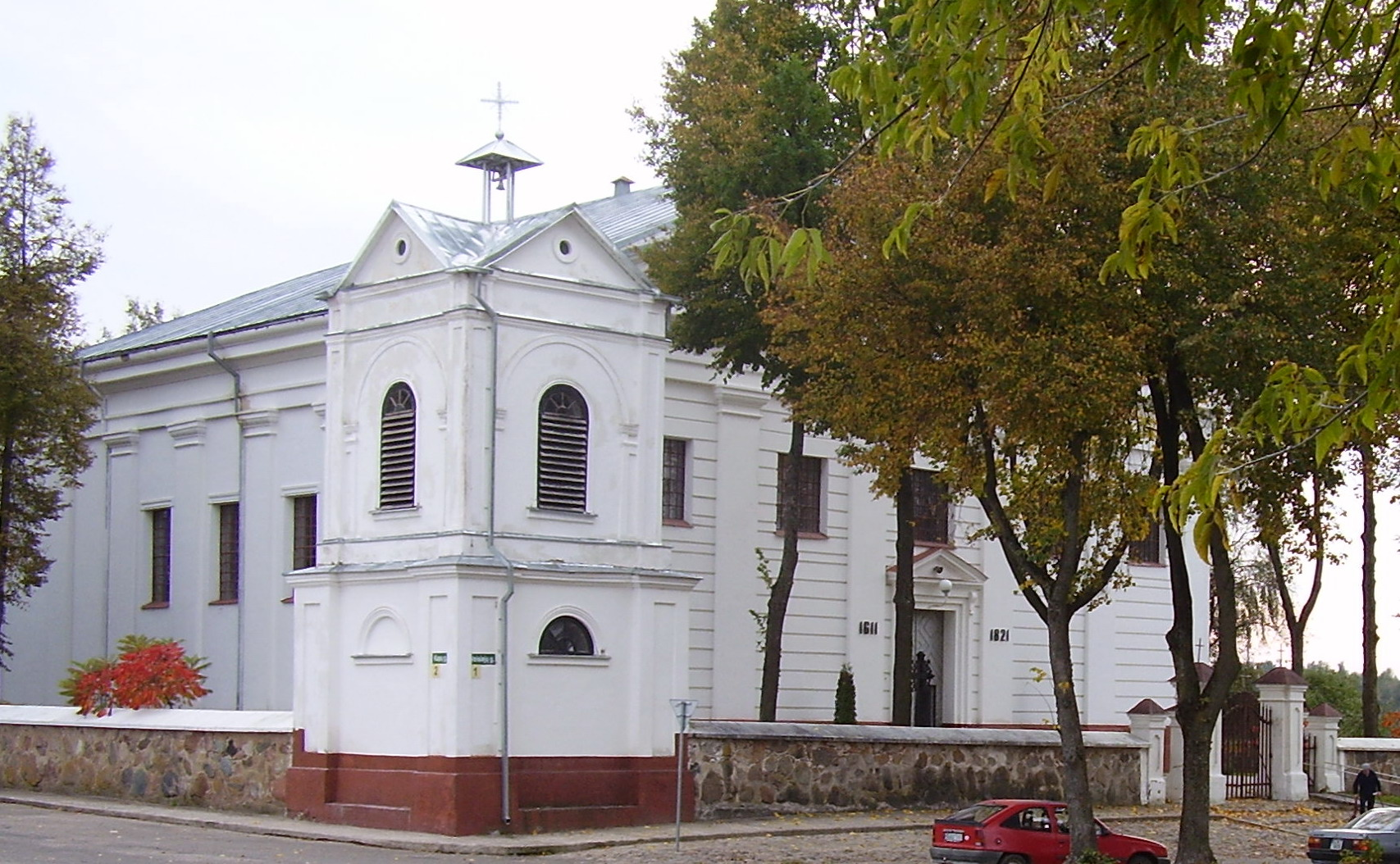
- Leipalingis, the only town in the eldership

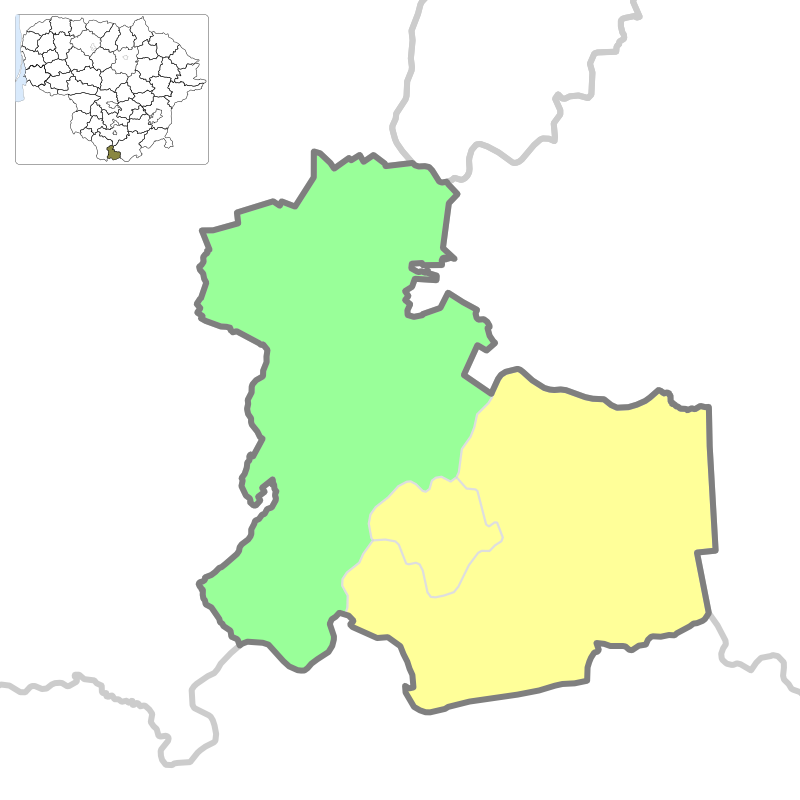
- Location of Leipalingis Eldership
- Country: Lithuania
- Ethnographic region: Dzūkija
- County: Alytus County
- Municipality: Druskininkai Municipality
- Administrative centre: Leipalingis

Area
  - Total: 259 km^{2} (100 sq mi)

Population (2021)
  - Total: 3,143
  - Density: 12.1/km^{2} (31.4/sq mi)
- Time zone: UTC+2 (EET)
  - Summer (DST): UTC+3 (EEST)

Leipalingis Eldership (Lithuanian: Leipalingio seniūnija) is a Lithuanian eldership, located in the western part of Druskininkai Municipality.

== Geography ==
Leipalingis Eldership is mostly covered by the Kapčiamiestis Forest.

- Rivers: Neman.
- Lakes and ponds: Aviris.
- Forests: Kapčiamiestis Forest.
