= Druskininkai Municipality =

Druskininkai Municipality Druskininkų savivaldybė
- District Municipality
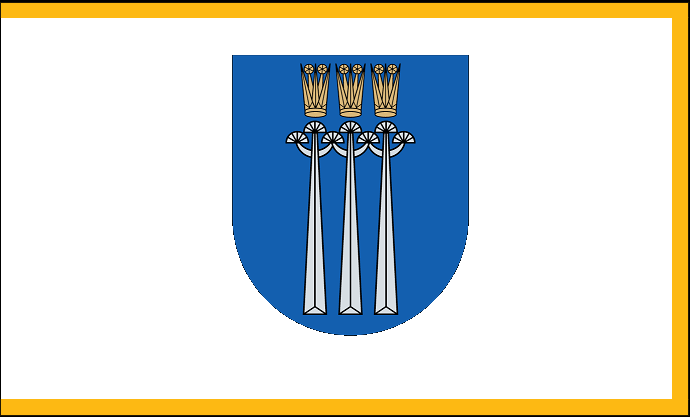
- Flag Coat of arms Brandmark

- Location of Druskininkai Municipality within Lithuania

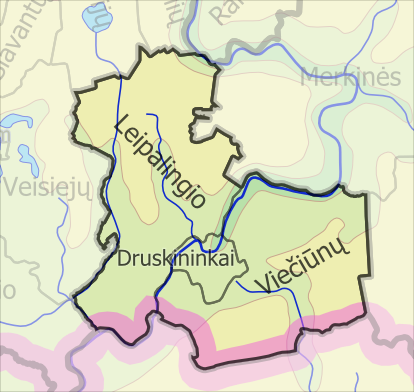
- Location of Druskininkai
- Coordinates: 53°58′40″N 23°58′24″E
- Country: Lithuania
- Region: Dzūkija
- County: Alytus County
- Established: 2000 (26 years ago)
- Capital: Druskininkai
- Elderships: Viečiūnai, Leipalingis

Government
  - Type: City Council
  - Body: Druskininkai Council
  - Mayor: Ričardas Malinauskas (Political Action Committee)
  - Leading: Political Committee 18 / 25

Area
  - Total: 453 km^{2} (175 sq mi)
  - Rank: 49th
- Elevation: 110 m (360 ft)

Population (2026)
  - Total: 19,866
  - Rank: 43rd
  - Density: 44.27/km^{2} (114.7/sq mi)
  - Rank: 15th
- Time zone: UTC+2 (EET)
  - Summer (DST): UTC+3 (EEST)
- ZIP Codes: 66001–67308
- Phone code: +370 (313)
- Website: www.druskininkusavivaldybe.lt

Druskininkai Municipality (Lithuanian: Druskininkų savivaldybė) is a municipality in Alytus County, Lithuania.

== Elderships ==
Druskininkai Municipality is divided into two elderships:

Eldership (Administrative Center)	Area	Population (2021)
Leipalingis Eldership (Leipalingis)	259 km^{2} (64,000.29 acres; 100.00 sq mi)	3,143
Viečiūnai Eldership (Viečiūnai)	188 km^{2} (46,455.81 acres; 72.59 sq mi)	3,998

== Demographics ==
Historical population

Year	Pop.	±%
1979	12,464	—
1989	18,943	+52.0%
2001	25,440	+34.3%

Year	Pop.	±%
2011	21,663	−14.8%
2021	20,049	−7.5%

== Population by locality ==
2011 Census
Locality	Status	Total	Male	Female
Druskininkų mun.		21,803	9,692	12,111
Druskininkai	M	14,764	6,358	8,406
Leipalingio Ward (seniūnija)		3,368	1,607	1,761
Baltoji Ančia HES	K	7	3	4
Barzdžiūnai	K	52	17	35
Butelionys	K	0	0	0
Cimaniūnai	K	42	21	21
Černiauskai	K	15	8	7
Čivonys	K	0	0	0
Degėsiai	K	14	4	10
Didžiasalis	K	87	38	49
Diržai	K	40	20	20
Drapaliai	K	15	9	6
Druskininkėliai	K	18	10	8
Dubraviškės	K	0	0	0
Dulgininkai	K	22	10	12
Gailiūnai	K	424	217	207
Gerdašiai	K	38	19	19
Guobiniai	K	44	19	25
Guronys	K	3	3	0
Janavas	K	2	1	1
Jovaišiai	K	155	84	71
Kamorūnai	K	20	13	7
Karalinavas	VS	3	1	2
Kaziuliai	K	26	12	14
Krivonys	K	8	3	5
Leipalingis	K	62	30	32
Leipalingis	MST	1,552	731	821
Liepiškiai	K	28	15	13
Lipliūnai	K	50	17	33
Margai	K	0	0	0
Mažonys	K	39	18	21
Miciūnai	K	12	4	8
Mikalina	K	0	0	0
Mizarai	K	41	15	26
Panemunė	K	9	6	3
Paseirė	K	8	3	5
Radvilonys	K	15	8	7
Raudonikiai	K	13	5	8
Ricieliai	K	149	73	76
Ringėliškė	K	12	5	7
Saltoniškė	K	4	0	4
Savanoriai	K	61	29	32
Snaigupė	K	68	35	33
Stračiūnai	K	107	47	60
Sventijanskas	K	0	0	0
Šaulėnai	K	6	3	3
Tautėnai	K	21	10	11
Vaikšnoriškė	K	2	1	1
Veršiai	K	24	14	10
Vileikiai	K	11	6	5
Vilkanastrai	K	32	18	14
Voverys	K	1	0	1
Zasčiūniškė	K	6	2	4
Viečiūnų Ward (seniūnija)		3,671	1,727	1,944
Grūtas	K	166	72	94
Jaskonys	K	310	146	164
Kermušija	K	11	4	7
Latežeris	K	35	19	16
Mašnyčios	K	36	15	21
Naujasodė	K	55	28	27
Neravai	K	965	456	509
Randamonys	K	64	30	34
Ratnyčia	K	4	2	2
Švendubrė	K	293	147	146
Timakavas	K	0	0	0
Viečiūnai	MST	1,708	793	915
Žiogeliai	K	24	15	9

- Status: M, MST - city, town / K, GST - village / VS - steading
