= Druskininkai =

- City
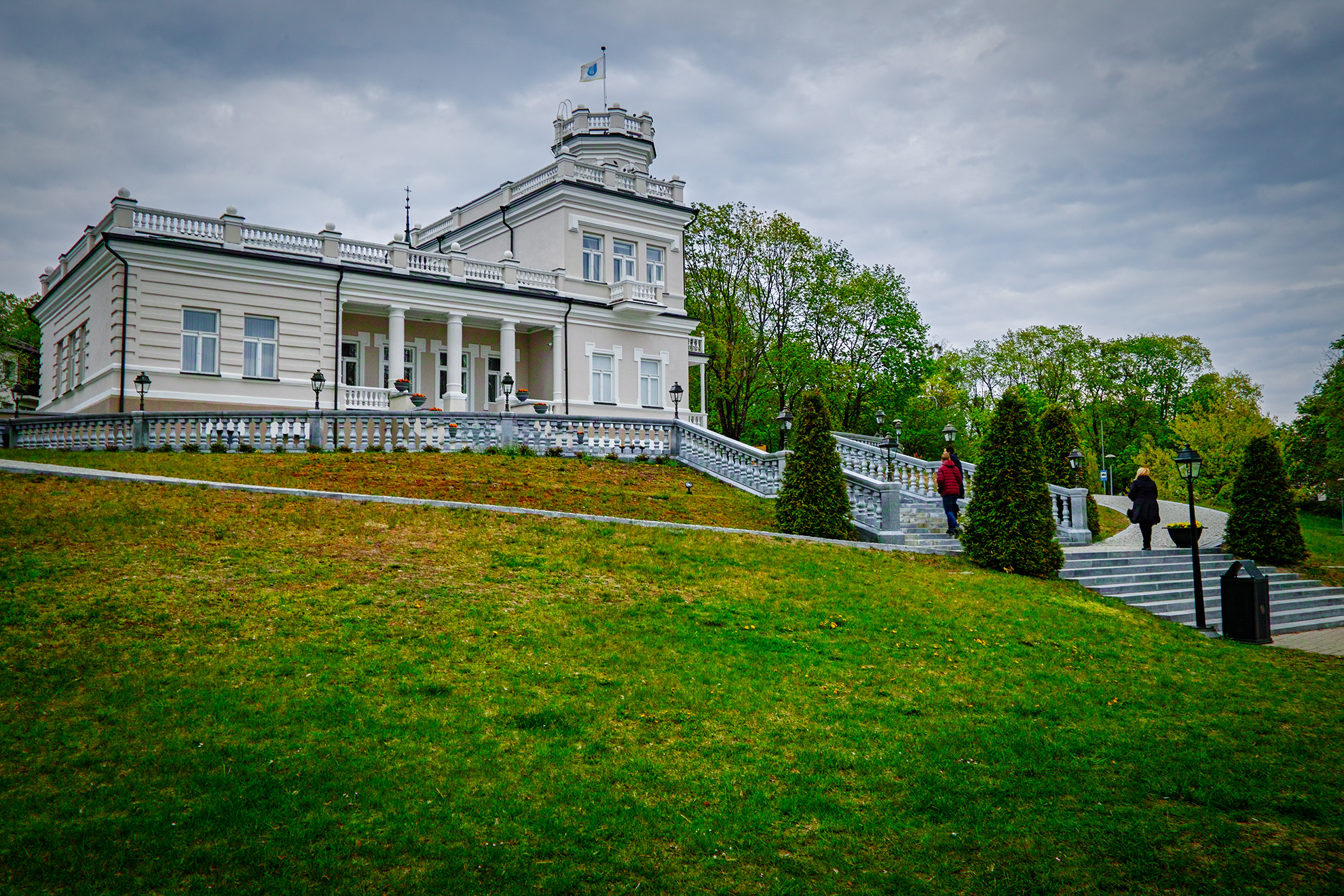
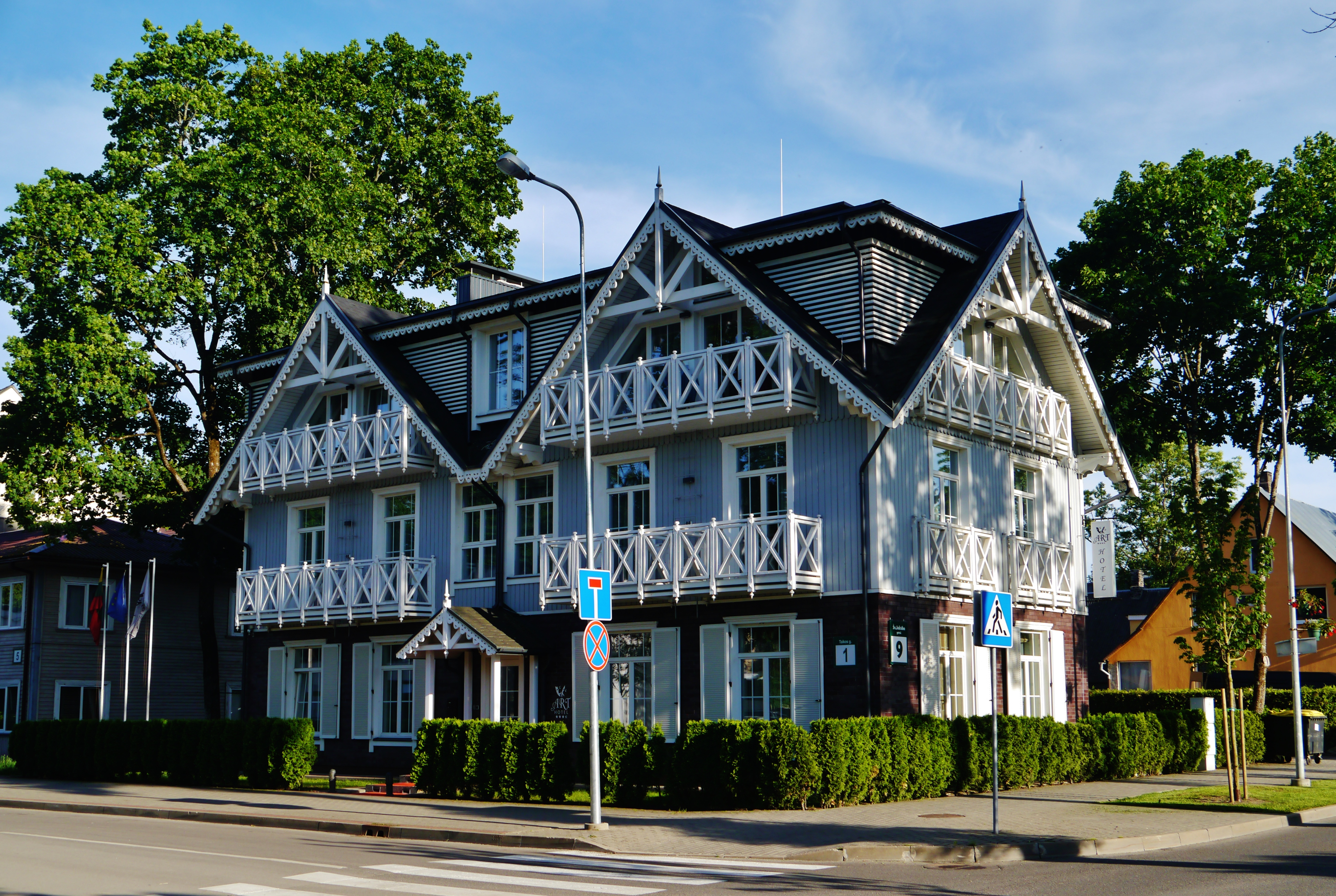
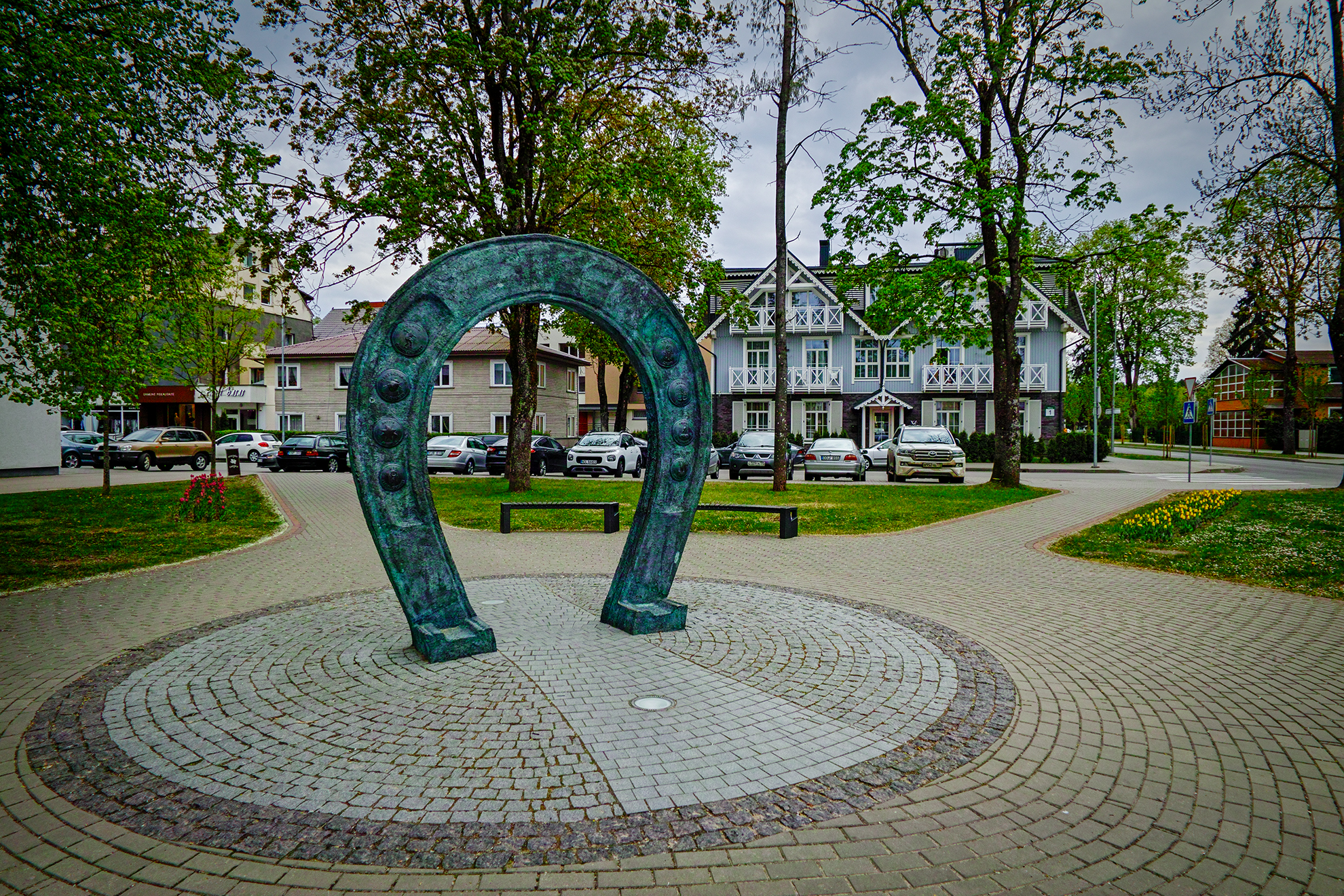
- Clockwise from top: Druskininkai City Center; Wooden house; Sculpture; Museum of Druskininkai

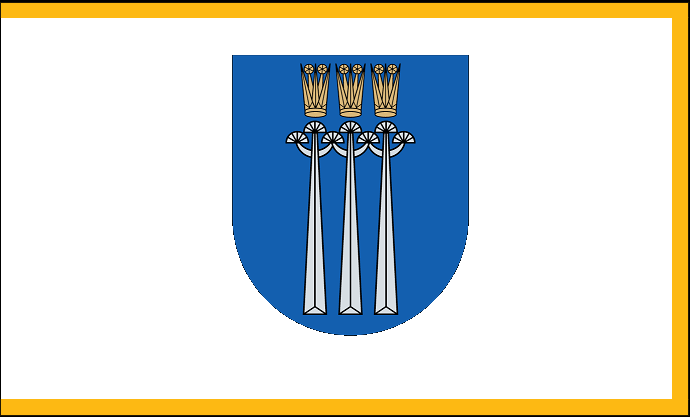
- Flag Coat of arms Brandmark
- Interactive map of Druskininkai
- Location of Druskininkai Druskininkai (Europe)
- Coordinates: 54°1′N 23°58′E
- Country: Lithuania
- Ethnographic region: Dzūkija
- County: Alytus County
- Municipality: Druskininkai municipality
- Capital of: Druskininkai municipality
- First mentioned: 1596
- Granted city rights: 1893

Area
  - Total: 24 km^{2} (9.3 sq mi)

Population (2024)
  - Total: 12,999
  - Density: 540/km^{2} (1,400/sq mi)
- Time zone: UTC+2 (EET)
  - Summer (DST): UTC+3 (EEST)
- Website: druskininkusavivaldybe.lt

Druskininkai (Lithuanian pronunciation: [ˈdrʊsʲkʲɪnʲɪŋkɐɪ]; also see other names) is a spa city on the Nemunas River in southern Lithuania, close to the borders of Belarus and Poland. The city of Druskininkai is known for being a spa resort since the 19th century.

== Name ==
The exact origin of the city name is not certain, but it is derived from the Lithuanian word druska (which means salt). The name of the city in other languages includes Polish: Druskieniki; Belarusian: Друскенiкi; Yiddish: דרוזגעניק, romanized: Druzgenik; German: Druscheninken.

== Geography ==
The city is located on the right bank of the Nemunas River near the confluence with the Ratnyčia River and is surrounded by a natural forest reserve. The city is situated in a picturesque landscape with rivers, lakes, hills and forests.

== History ==
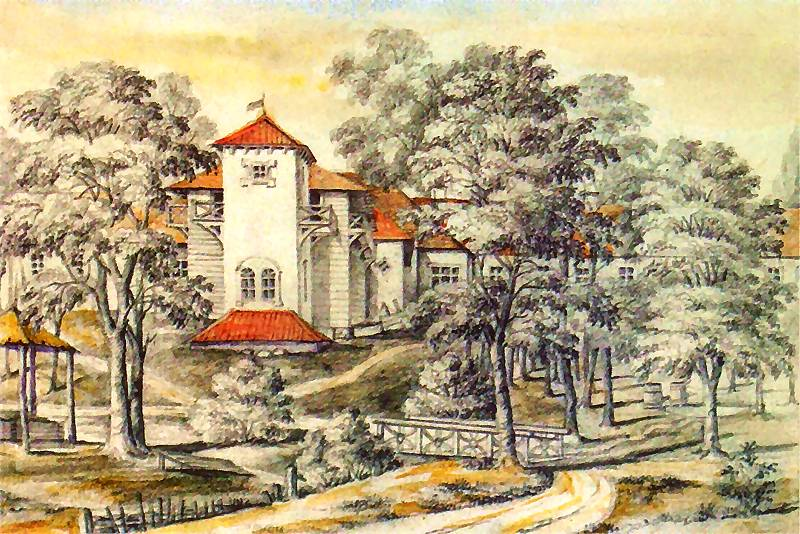
1868 painting of Druskininkai by Napoleon Orda

According to some sources the site of present-day Druskininkai was inhabited by local Yotvingian tribes in the early Middle Ages. In the 13th century the area became a part of the expanding Duchy of Lithuania. A small castle was built in the area as a part of the defence system against the Teutonic Order. In 1308 the castle was conquered by the Teutonic Knights and destroyed, causing a depopulation of the area. In 1569, the area of Druskininkai came under Polish influence.

The first written mention of Druskininkai dates back to 1636. The name of the city suggests that the local population collected minerals such as salt. In the late 18th century it was believed that minerals found in the waters of Druskininkai area produced health benefits and their usage in the medical treatment of asthma and other ailments began. In the early 19th century Ignacy Fonberger, a professor at the University of Vilnius, analyzed the chemical composition of Druskininkai's waters and showed that they contain large amounts of Calcium, Sodium, Potassium, Iodine, Bromine, Iron and Magnesium. He also promoted the city as a holiday resort for the population of Vilnius. In the eighteenth century, the city was eagerly visited by Polish kings who treated their health ailments.

After the Third Partition of Poland in 1795, Druskininkai became part of the Russian Empire (Russian partition of Poland). In 1837 Tsar Nicholas I of Russia bestowed upon Druskininkai the status of a spa, and construction of pensions and hostels started. To ease communication to the spa, a ferry service on the Nemunas was started. The spa became popular in many parts of the former Polish–Lithuanian Commonwealth. In 1862 the Warsaw – Saint Petersburg Railway was opened and Druskininkai's railway station was placed only 19 kilometres (12 miles) from the city.

In June 1887, a Jewish national conference was held in Druskininkai led by Leon Pinsker and Moses Lilienblum which discussed ideas that played an important role in the development of the Zionist movement.

By the beginning of the 20th century the Druskininkai spa was one of the most popular resorts in the area and a place of summer residence for the middle class of Vilnius, Warsaw and Moscow.

After World War I the city became part of Poland. Its popularity was increased by the patronage of Józef Piłsudski, who spent most of his summer holidays there and promoted the development of the area. Soon most of the resort was bought up by the state-owned Bank Gospodarstwa Krajowego and the construction of luxurious villas and pensions started. According to the first Polish census of 1921, Druskininkai was inhabited by 989 people, among whom 646 were Roman Catholic, 46 Orthodox, 3 Evangelical and 294 Jewish. At the same time, 700 inhabitants declared Polish nationality, 8 Belarusian, 242 Jewish, 20 Russian and only 19 Lithuanian. There were 308 residential buildings here. In 1934 a railway link with the Parečča train station was opened and the city became more accessible to the general public. It was a gmina (municipal) center in Grodno powiat (county) of Białystok Voivodeship.

After Poland was invaded in September 1939, the city was briefly incorporated into the Byelorussian SSR as raion center in Belastok Region. However, on 7 September 1940, Stalin transferred Druskininkai to Lithuania which in turn was annexed in August of that year and incorporated into the Soviet Union. It was occupied by Nazi Germany on 23 June 1941 and was part of Bezirk Bialystok. At this period, and as part of the "Final Solution" plan of the Nazis, the Jewish community of the city was wiped out. Some of the Jews were sent to ghettos in near-by Kaunas, and the remainder murdered by the Nazis. It was taken again by Red Army on 14 July 1944 and remained part of Lithuania under the Soviet occupation. In 1951, Druskininkai began to grow rapidly again and several huge sanatoriums and spa hospitals were opened. Over the time, the city became a major resort, attracting around 400,000 visitors.

== Landmarks and culture ==
Despite damage inflicted during World War I, the city features houses and villas reflecting all periods of its development – Russian, Polish and Lithuanian.

Druskininkų Vandens Parkas, the first water park in Lithuania, was opened in Druskininkai on 26 December 2006.

The Snow Arena (construction completed in August 2011) is one of the biggest indoor skiing slopes in Europe, with a year-round indoor slope length of 460 metres, width up to 63 metres, and a height difference of 65.65 metres. In addition there is a seasonal outdoor route of 640 metres. The complex houses a ski school called DruSkiSchool.

There are a number of art and historical museums and galleries in the city. Many cultural events take place, most of them during spring, summer and fall. During 1896–1910, famous Lithuanian composer and painter Mikalojus Konstantinas Čiurlionis lived and worked in the city. A number of regular events take place at his memorial museum each year. There is also an annual International Arts Festival called Druskininkų vasara su M. K. Čiurlioniu ('The summer in Druskininkai with M. K. Čiurlionis'). An annual poetry event, "Druskininkai poetic fall", began in 1985 and attracts authors from all over the world. In 2001, Grūtas park was opened near Druskininkai, highlighting sculptures and other materials of the Soviet occupation.

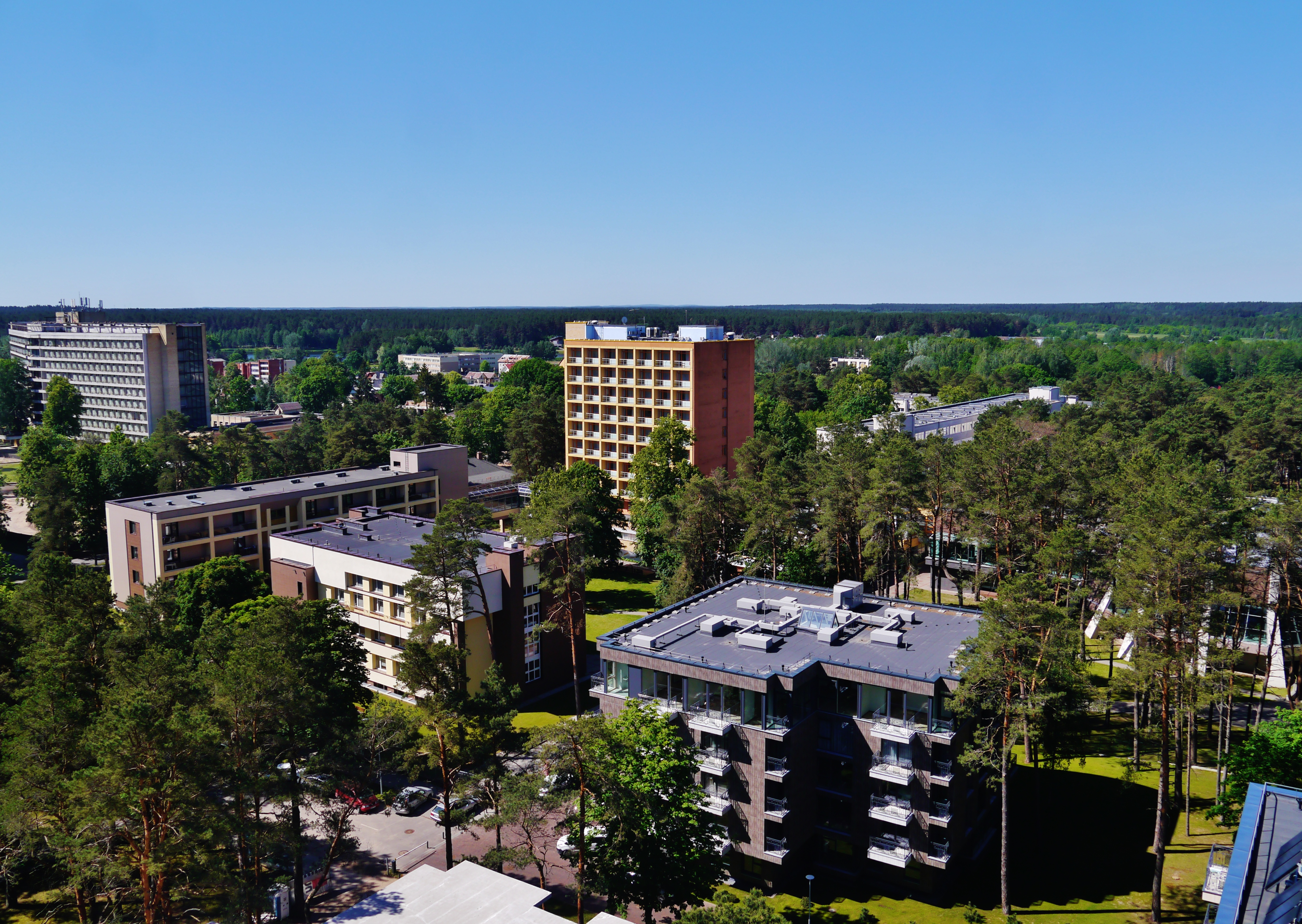
View from a cable car

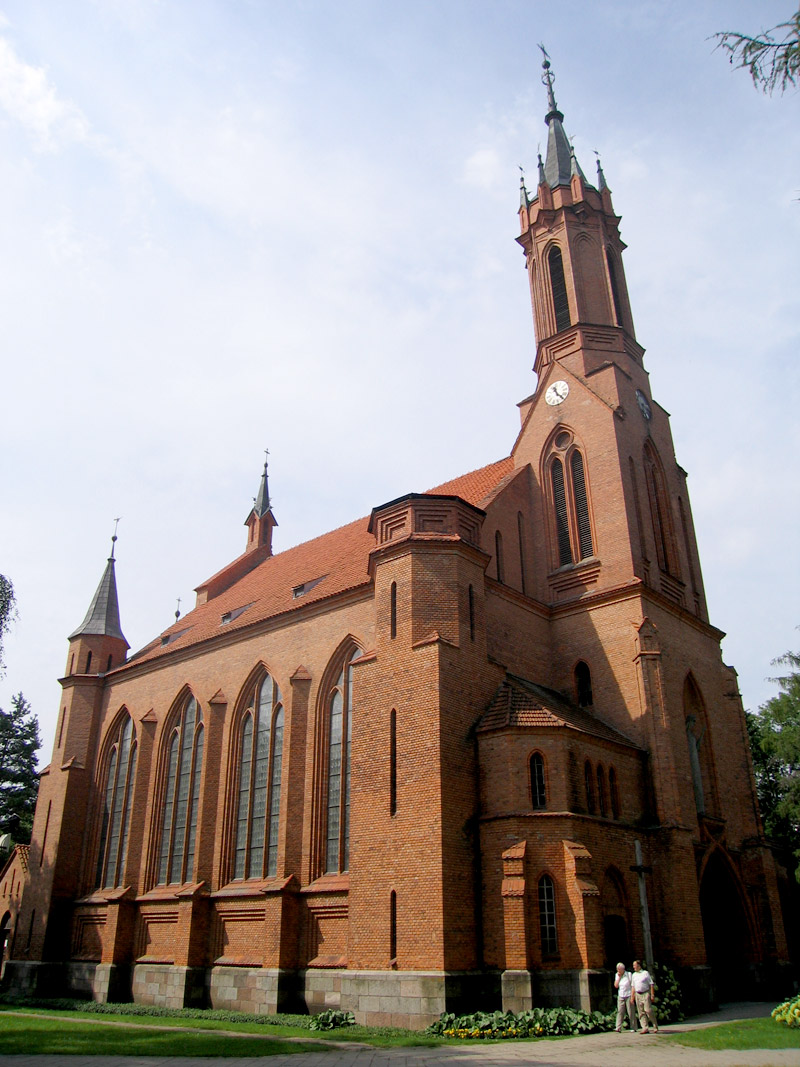
Saint Mary's Church, Druskininkai

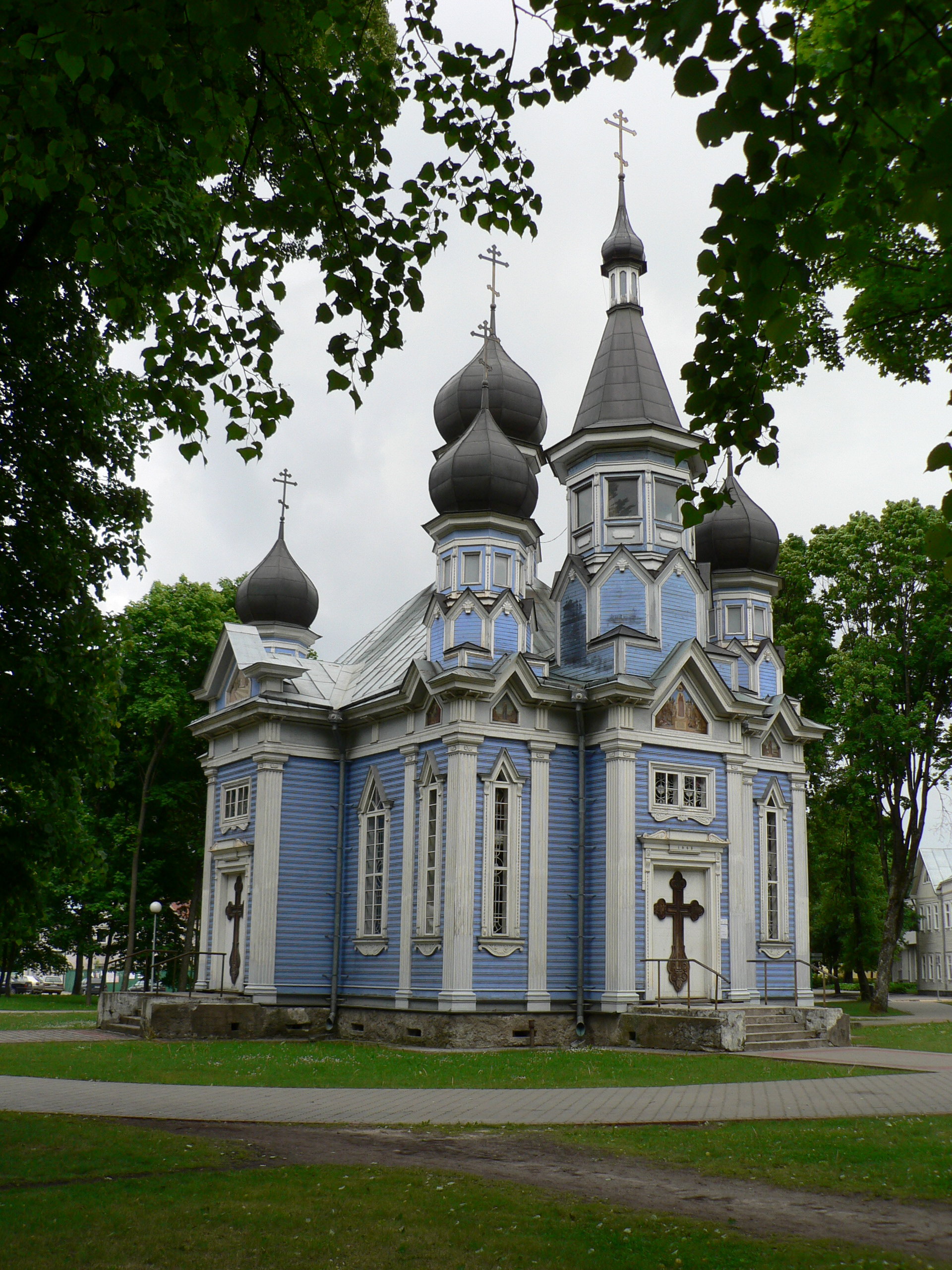
Orthodox church in Druskininkai

Snow Arena

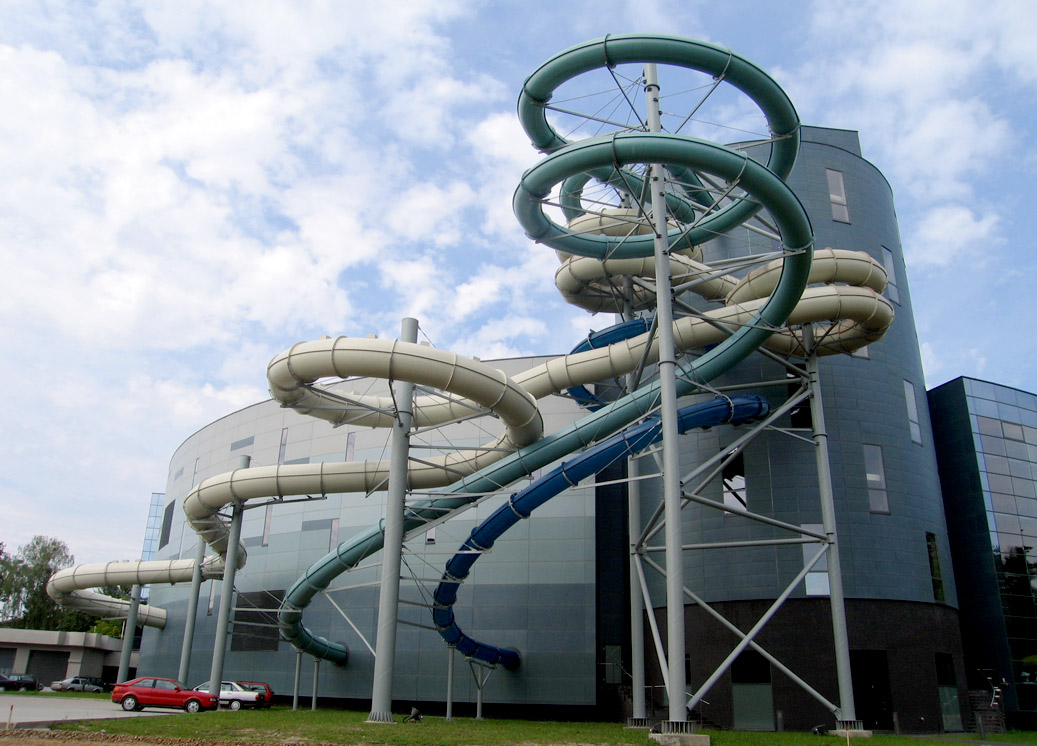
Water park in Druskininkai

== Twin towns – sister cities ==
Druskininkai is twinned with:

- Augustów, Poland
- Elbląg, Poland
- Strzelce Opolskie, Poland

== Notable residents ==
- Shmaryahu Yitzchak Bloch (ca. 1862–1923), rabbi
- The father of American actor Charles Bronson (1921–2003), Valteris P. Bučinskis, was born in Druskininkai
- Mikalojus Konstantinas Čiurlionis (1875–1911), lived here
- Jan Czeczot (1796–1847), poet and ethnographer, died here
- Jacques Lipchitz (1891–1973), Lithuanian Jewish sculptor, was born here
- Antanas Sniečkus (1902–1974), first secretary of the Lithuanian Communist Party died here
- Marian Turski (1926-2025), journalist and historian
