= Dainava Forest =

Forest in Lithuania

Dainava Forest Lithuanian: Dainavos giria Druskininkų‑Varėnos miškai
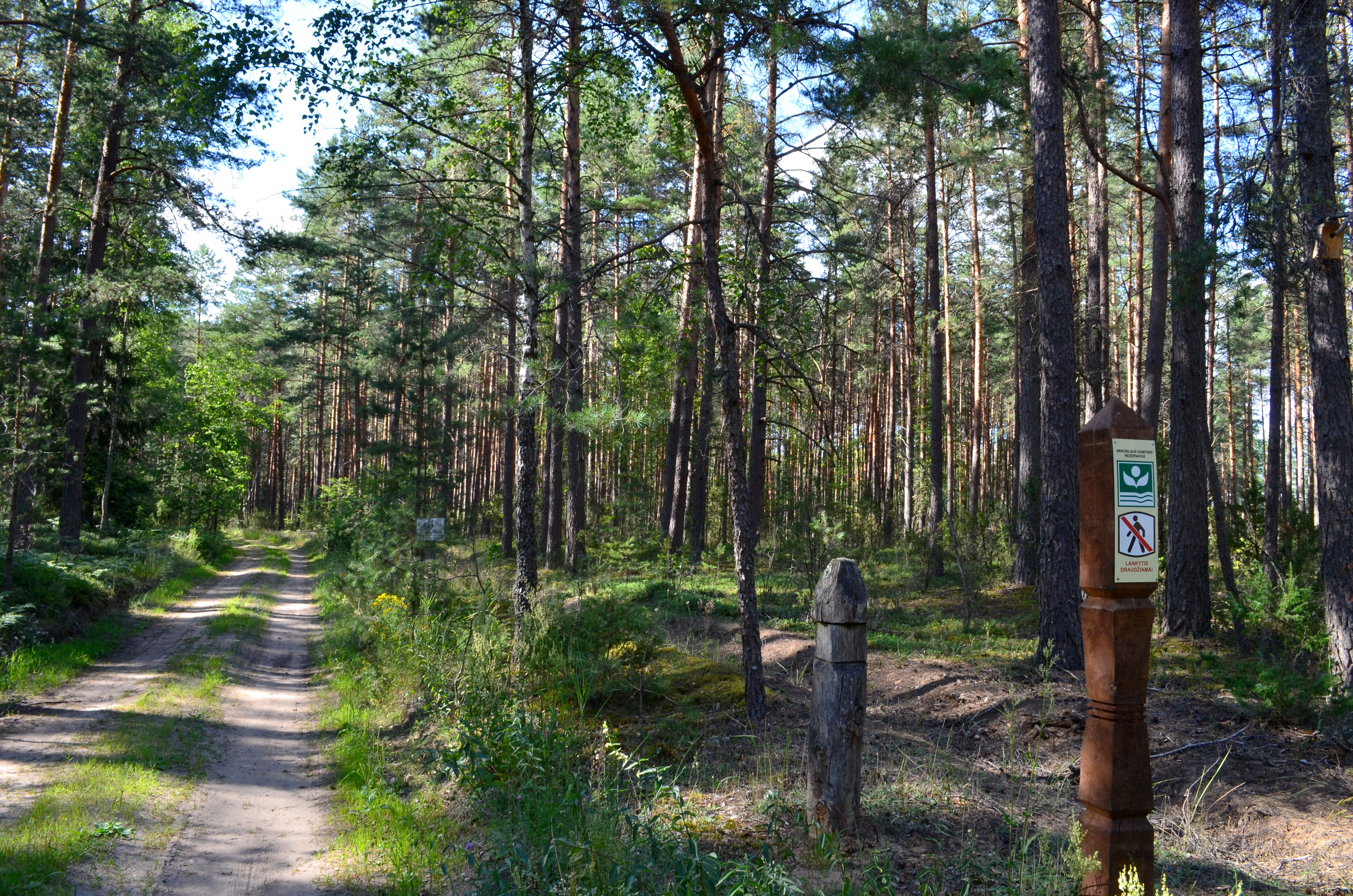
- Skroblus reserve

- Location within Lithuania

Geography
- Location: Alytus County, Lithuania
- Coordinates: 54.118°N 24.572°E
- Area: 1,450 km^{2} (560 sq mi)

Ecology
- Forest cover: pine (c. 90%), birch (3%), spruce (3%), black alder (3%)
- Fauna: roe deer, red fox, grey wolf, lynx

Dainava Forest (Lithuanian: Dainavos giria) also the Druskininkai-Varėna Forest (Lithuanian: Druskininkų‑Varėnos miškai), historically the Hrodna Forest (Polish: Puszcza Grodzieńska), or the Belarusian Forest (Lithuanian: Gudų giria) is the largest forest in Lithuania. It as a primeval forest in Dzūkija region (also known as Dainava) in southern Lithuania with the total area of 1,450 km^{2} (560 sq mi) of which 1,290 km^{2} (500 sq mi) is covered by trees. A large part of the forest is protected by the Dzūkija National Park and the Čepkeliai Nature Reserve.

The Dainava Forest mainly consists of pine trees. There are some birch, spruce, black alder groves. Soils are sandy, light, densely covered by cup lichen. The forest is rich in edible mushrooms, bilberries, cranberries, and cowberries. Collection of these mushrooms and berries are an important part of the local economy. The fauna includes many endangered species, such as the gray wolf, wood grouse, black grouse, hoopoe, Eurasian eagle-owl, osprey, mountain hare, stoat, Coronella austriaca, great capricorn beetle, and Lucanus cervus.

Most rivers belong to the basin of Merkys River, including the Ūla, Katra, Grūda, Varėnė, and Skroblus. These rivers are characterized by their clear, cold water, and numerous tributaries. Also, there are some tiny thermokarst lakes and bogs, including Čepkeliai Marsh, the largest bog in Lithuania.

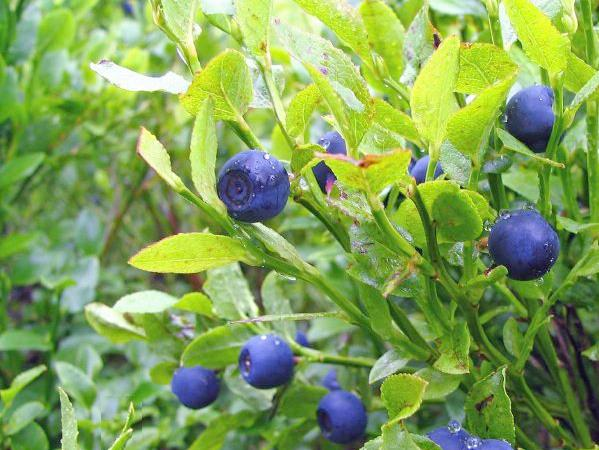
Forest is popular place for blueberries picking

Dainava Forest is the most sparsely populated region of Lithuania. Some of the villages were little affected by agricultural reforms and have preserved traditional Dzūkian folk architecture, which is now preserved as architecture monuments, destinations of rural tourism. These villages include Marcinkonys, Zervynos, Latežeris, Lynežeris, Dubininkas, Margionys, Musteika.

== Gallery ==
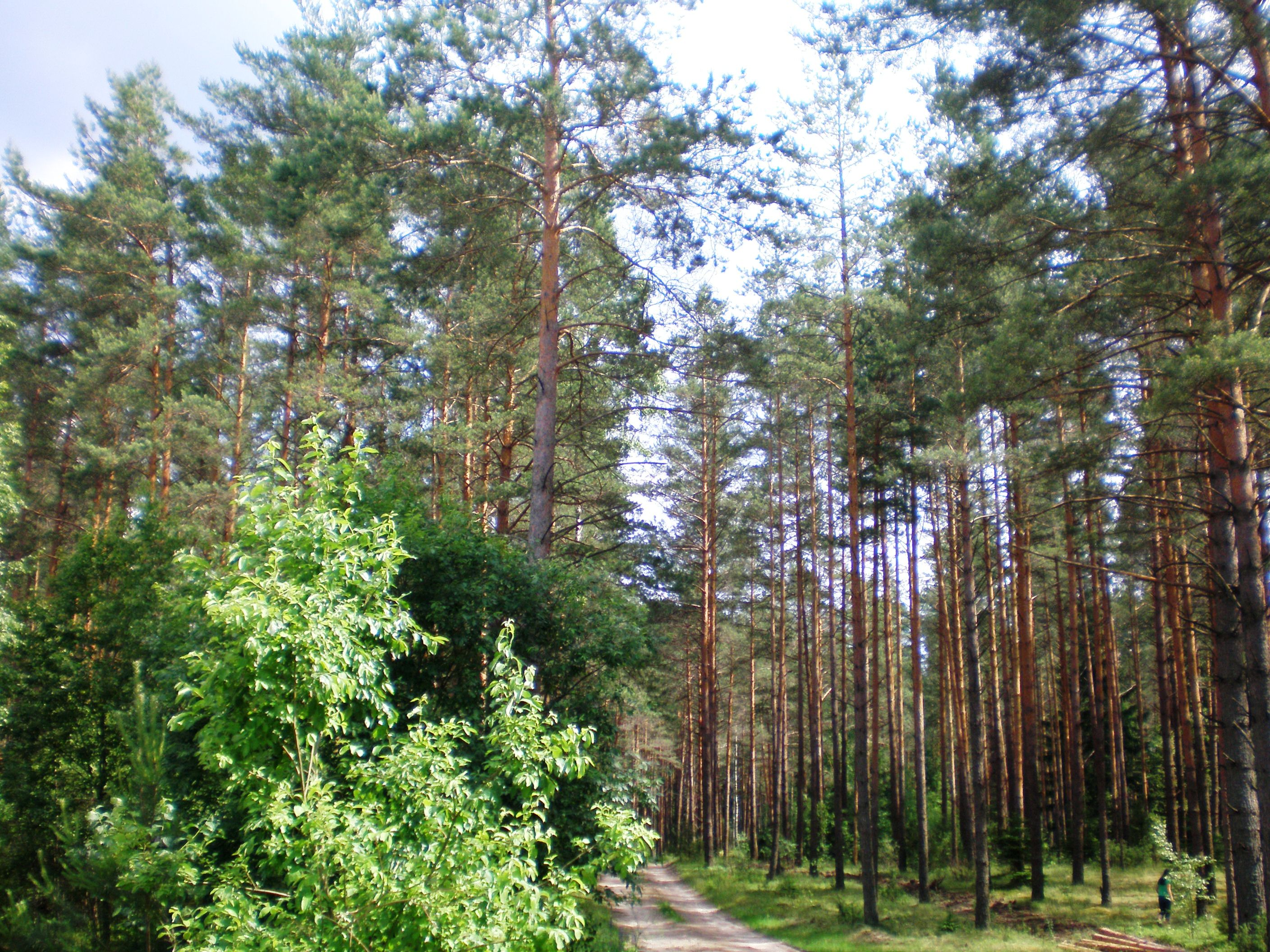
Pines of Dainava forest

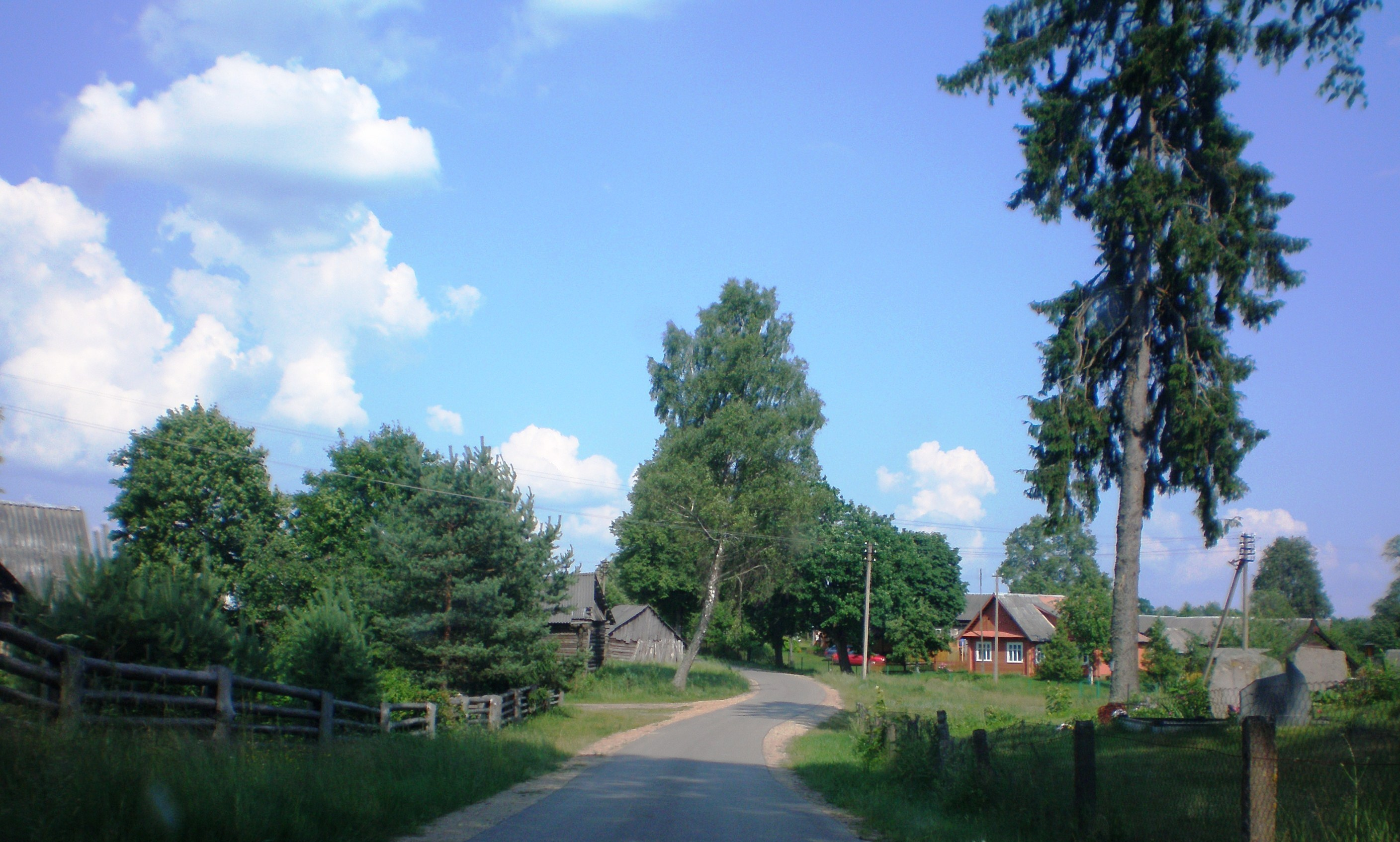
Ethnographic village of Lynežeris in the depths of the forest

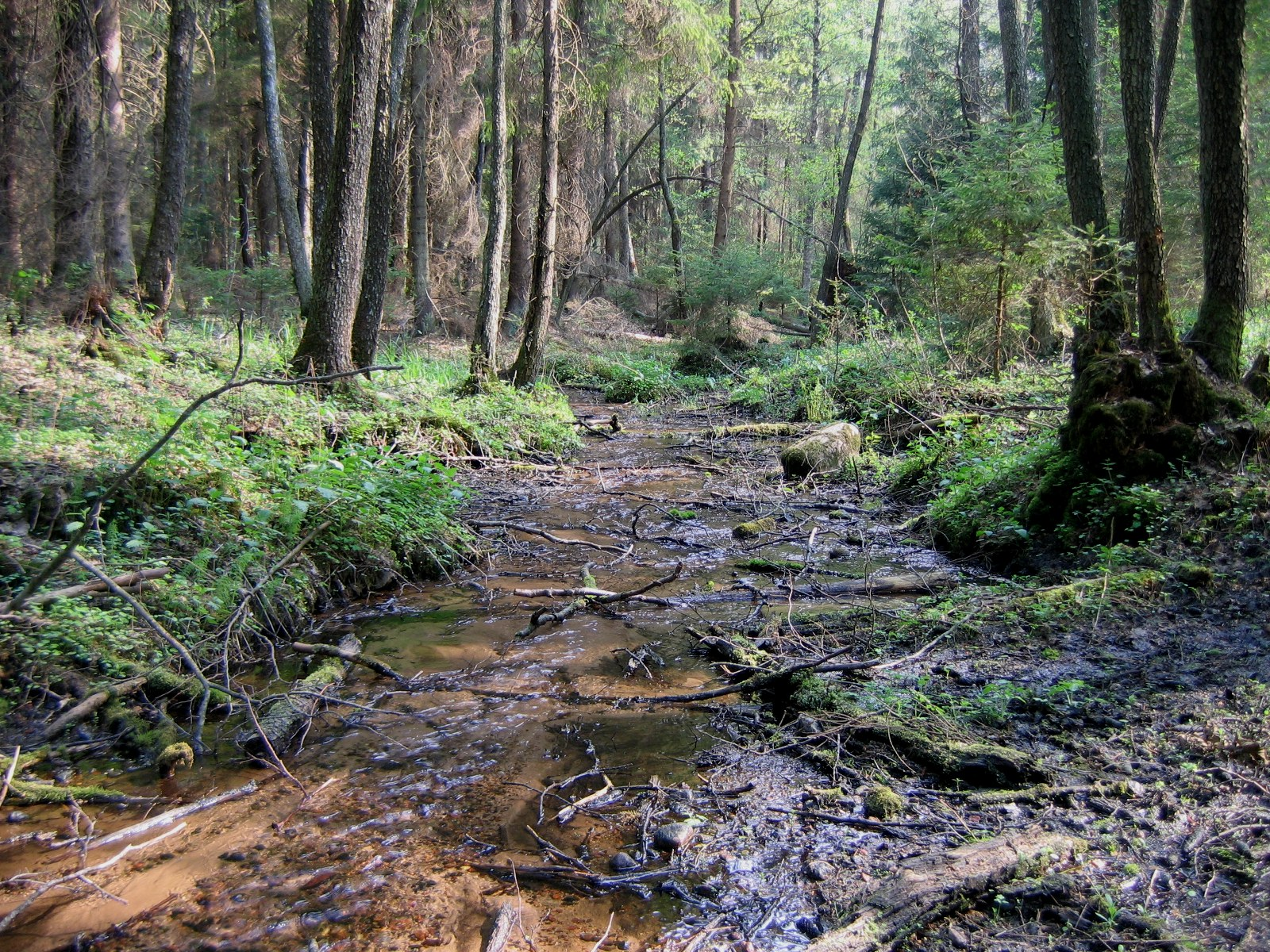
The sources of Varėnė river

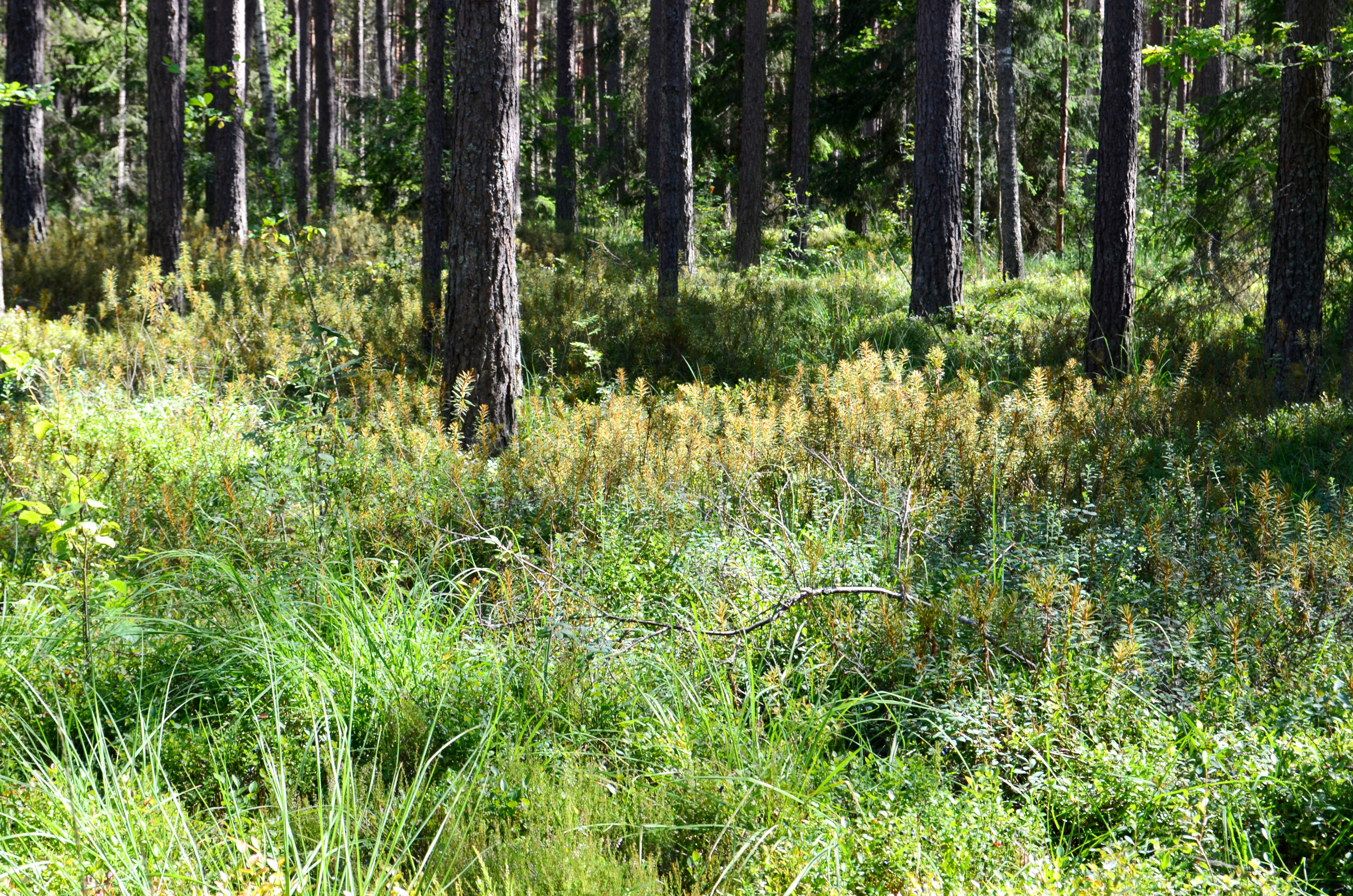
Wild rosemary undergrowth in Dainava forest near Musteika

== Sources ==
- Dainavos giria. Tarybų Lietuvos enciklopedija, T. 1 (A-Grūdas). Vilnius, Vyriausioji enciklopedijų redakcija, 1985, 374 psl.
