= Marcinkonys Ghetto =

Nazi ghetto in occupied Lithuania

- Location of Marcinkonys Ghetto within Lithuania
- Location: 54°03′40″N 24°24′0″E
- Date: November 1941(spring 1942) to 2 November 1942
- Incident type: Imprisonment, mass shootings, forced labor, starvation, exile
- Camp: Treblinka and Auschwitz concentration camp
- Victims: ~200

Marcinkonys or Marcinkańce Ghetto was a small Jewish ghetto established during the Holocaust in Marcinkonys (pre-war Second Polish Republic, war-time Bezirk Bialystok, post-war Lithuanian SSR). It existed from around November 1941 to November 1942 and housed 300 to 400 Jews.

== Establishment and operation ==
According to a Lithuanian report of 26 July 1941, there were 324 Jews, including 50 children under the age of 6, living in Marcinkonys. Most likely in early November 1941 (other sources provide spring 1942 after the Passover), an order was given to establish the Jewish ghetto near the train station of the Saint Petersburg–Warsaw Railway. After bribes by the Judenrat, the ghetto area was expanded from three houses to 14. The ghetto covered the area of 1.5 hectares (3.7 acres) surrounded by barbed wire and housed several dozens of Jews from nearby towns and villages, including Rudnia, Kabeliai, Valkininkai, Butrimonys, Varėna.

Living conditions inside the ghetto were better than in other Jewish ghettos. The ghetto had its own small Jewish police force, commanded by Berke Aizenshtat. Most ghetto inmates were forced to work at the railway station, on the roads, in forestry, or in the mushroom-canning factory, but some managed to retain their pre-war trade. In summer 1942, 70 Jewish survivors arrived at the ghetto bringing accounts of mass killings and other atrocities. That heightened the tensions and a group of young Jews planned to escape and join the Jewish partisans. The Judenrat even smuggled 12 guns into the ghetto.

== Liquidation ==
On 2 November 1942, orders were given to liquidate the ghetto and transport the Jews to Treblinka and Auschwitz concentration camps. A squad of 15 Germans, under the command of Gendarmerie Hauptwachmeister Albert Wietzke, ordered the Jews to gather at the entrance at 8am to be "transported for labor." Witnesses present different accounts of further events. According to an official complaint written by forester Hans Lehmann, two of the Germans opened fire at the crowded Jews without a reasonable cause. Other authors present the events as a revolt inspired by Aaron Kobrowski, chairman of the Judenrat. Panicked Jews attempted to escape through the fence into the nearby forest or back into the ghetto. The Germans then searched the ghetto, shooting any Jews on sight and destroying five secret bunkers with grenades. In total, 105 or 132 Jews were shot.

Over the next few weeks, Germans and local collaborators searched for the escaped Jews and about 90 to 100 Jews were killed. A group of 21 Jews, including 7 women, were shot when their hideout near Musteika village was betrayed by a local man. About 46 Jews survived the war, mostly as members of the Kobrowski partisan group, recognized as part of the Davidov brigade of the Soviet partisans in 1943.

Hans Lehmann, who had joined the Nazi Party in 1933, was investigated and it was determined that he was sympathetic to the Jews and allowed them to escape. He was discredited and transferred. In 1943, Jewish partisans derailed a German train east of Białystok. Lehmann was among the captured Germans. He was recognized by one of the escapees from Marcinkonys and executed for his role in the massacre.
