= Musteika =

- village
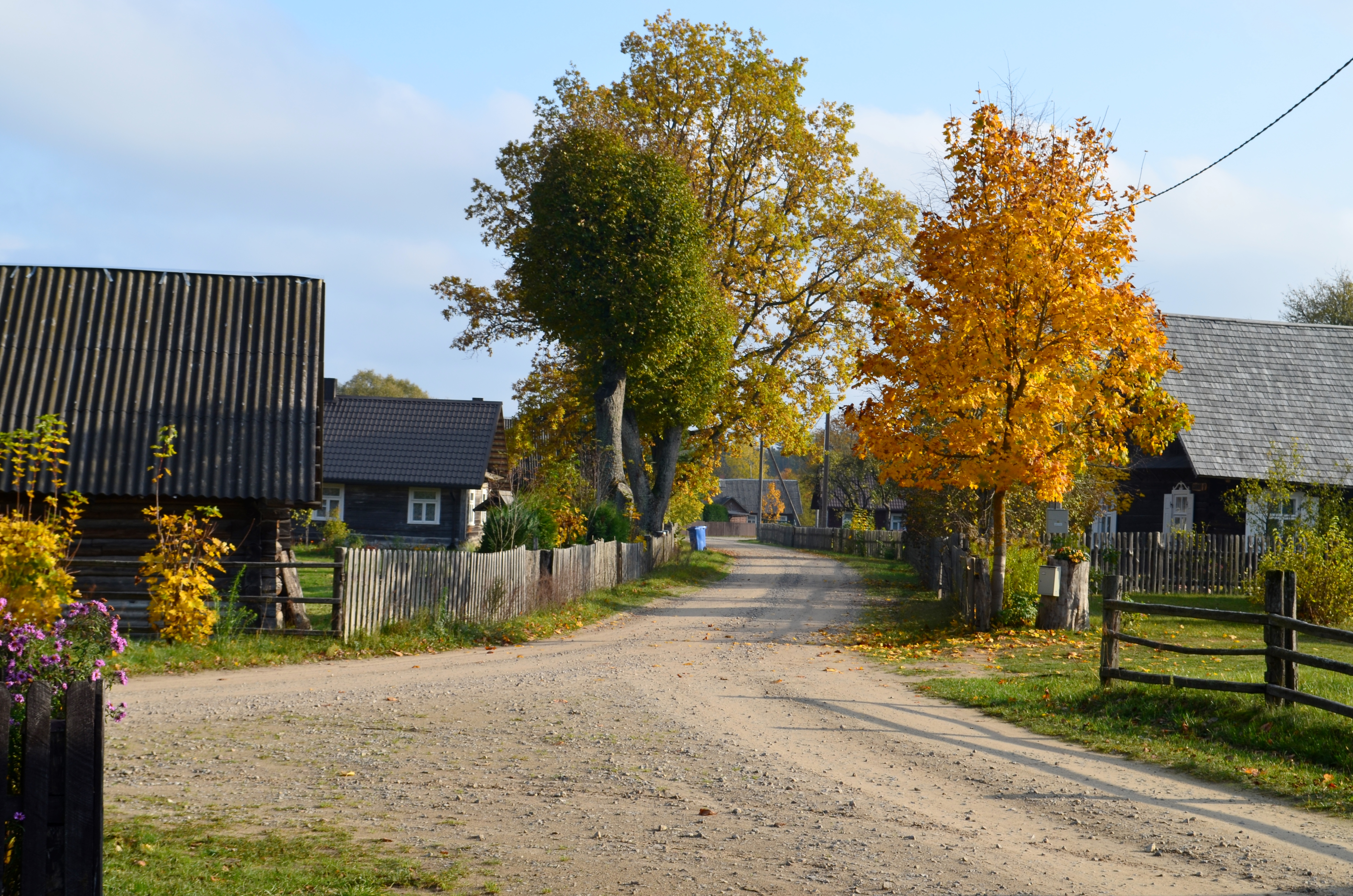
- Interactive map of Musteika
- Location within Varėna District Municipality Location within Lithuania
- Coordinates: 53°57′29″N 24°22′01″E
- Country: Lithuania
- County: Alytus County
- Municipality: Varėna
- Eldership: Marcinkonys Eldership

Population (2021)
  - Total: 36
- Time zone: UTC+2 (EET)
  - Summer (DST): UTC+3 (EEST)

Musteika is a village in Varėna district municipality, in Alytus County, in southeastern Lithuania. According to the 2021 census, the village has a population of 36 people.

Musteika village is located c. 30 kilometres (19 mi) from Druskininkai, 13 kilometres (8.1 mi) from Marcinkonys, 6 kilometres (3.7 mi) from Kabeliai (the nearest settlement), 5 kilometres (3.1 mi) from the Belarusian border.

== Etymology ==
The name Musteika comes from a same personal name Musteika (its other forms Musteikis, Masteika, Mosteika) which is of uncertain origin but probably comes from the Lithuanian root mąst- ('to think, to consider').

== Location ==
Musteika village is located c. 30 kilometres (19 mi) from Druskininkai, 12 kilometres (7.5 mi) from Marcinkonys, 5 kilometres (3.1 mi) from Kabeliai (the nearest settlement), 6 kilometres (3.7 mi) from the Belarusian border, amidst the Dainava Forest, by the Musteika Rivulet. The largest Lithuanian swamp the Čepkeliai Marsh begins 6 kilometres (3.7 mi) to the East from Musteika.

Musteika officially is the southernmost Lithuanian settlement (the uninhabited forested area with the southernmost point officially belongs to Musteika, although the southernmost inhabitable place is Ašašninkai).

The village is located in the Dzūkija National Park. Its surroundings differ from common Dzūkish bright pine forests: there are more black alder, spruce, aspen forests and swamps around here. Musteika forests hosts many rare and protected plant species, also grey wolf, European lynx, moose, crane population. The Musteika Nature Reserve was founded nearby village in 1997. The last Lithuanian brown bear was shot near Musteika in 1883.

Formerly (1975–2003), between Musteika and Grybaulia villages, there was a large aquiculture pool complex but it was abandoned and dried out.

== Architecture ==
Musteika is an ethnographic village and architecture monument, representing traditional Wood Dzūkian lifestyle. The village consist of the mid-19th and the beginning 20 c. wooden houses and other buildings. Central part of the village is of the linear plan while in the northern and eastern part building plan is more chaotic, homesteads intermix with forests. All of the buildings are made of wood, small. Homesteads consist from traditional Dzūkish houses (called pirkia), granaries (svirnas), stables and stackyards. Territories fenced by wooden fences, lever wells are used for water drawing and special stacks (žardas) for hay drying. Because of high ground water level there are some above-ground cellars (or, formerly, cellar holes in the forest). Traditionally, there were several communal saunas, some of them so called black or smoke saunas.

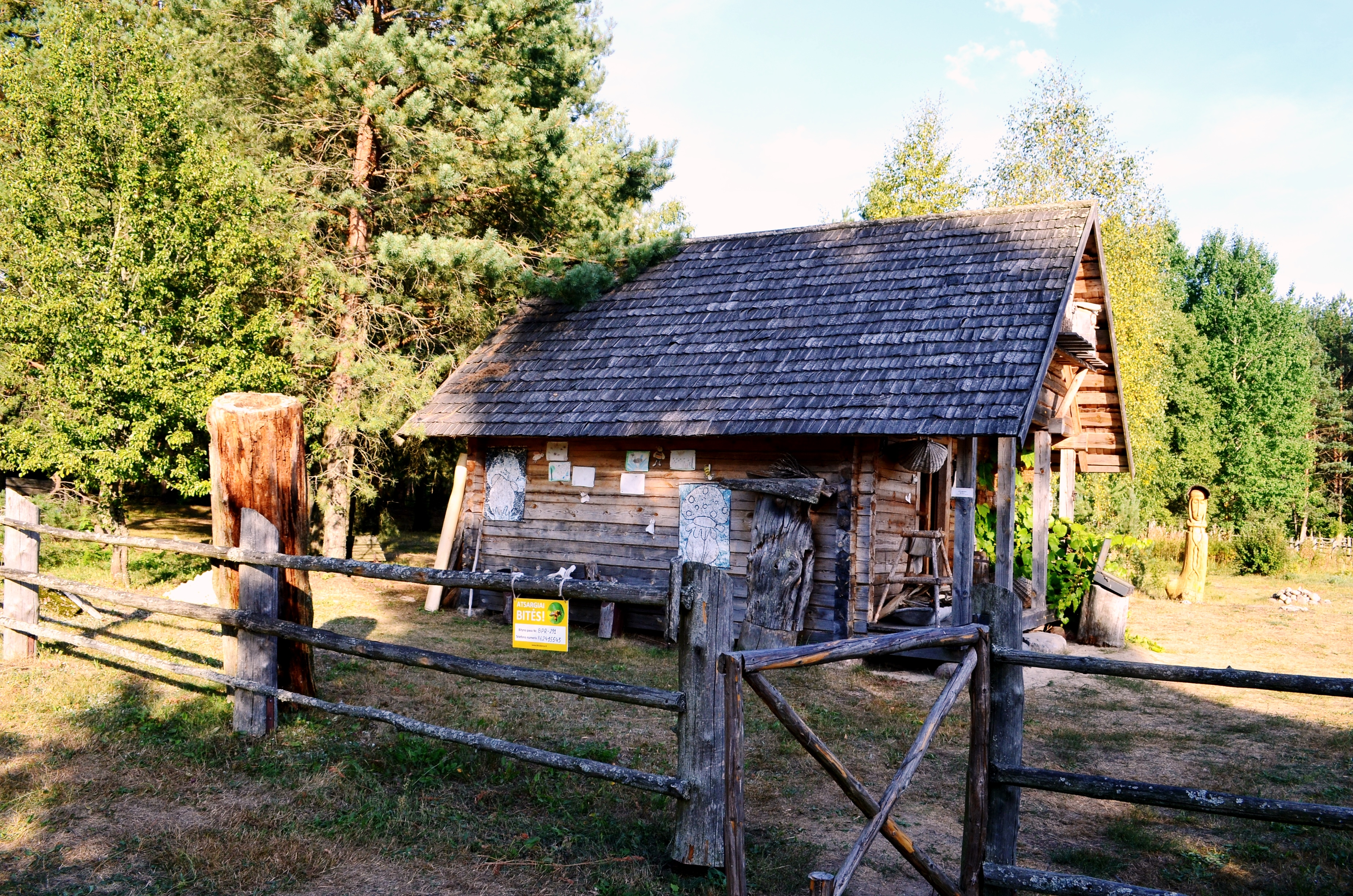
Musteika Dzūkish Traditional Beekeeping Museum

There are 4 streets in the village - Gandrų ("Stork Street"), Tilto ("Bridge Street"), Ąžuolo ("Oak Street") and Musteikos ("Musteika street"). Some of them have small alleys of black alder, lime, oak trees. There are two small wooden bridges over the Musteika Rivulet. Various wooden crosses are scattered in Musteika: some of them are built by the houses, some by the roads. The central object of Musteika is a cross triplet in the main crossroad of the village. These crosses and small white aprons are for the protection of the village and for the commemoration of local families. Another cross in the Gandrų and Tilto streets' crossroad has been built to commemorate the massacre of 1944 St John's Day when Soviet soldiers killed 14 local men. Several other crosses for local resistance and accidental deaths have been built in the surrounding forests. There is an inactive local cemetery on the pine tree hill in the southern part of the village.

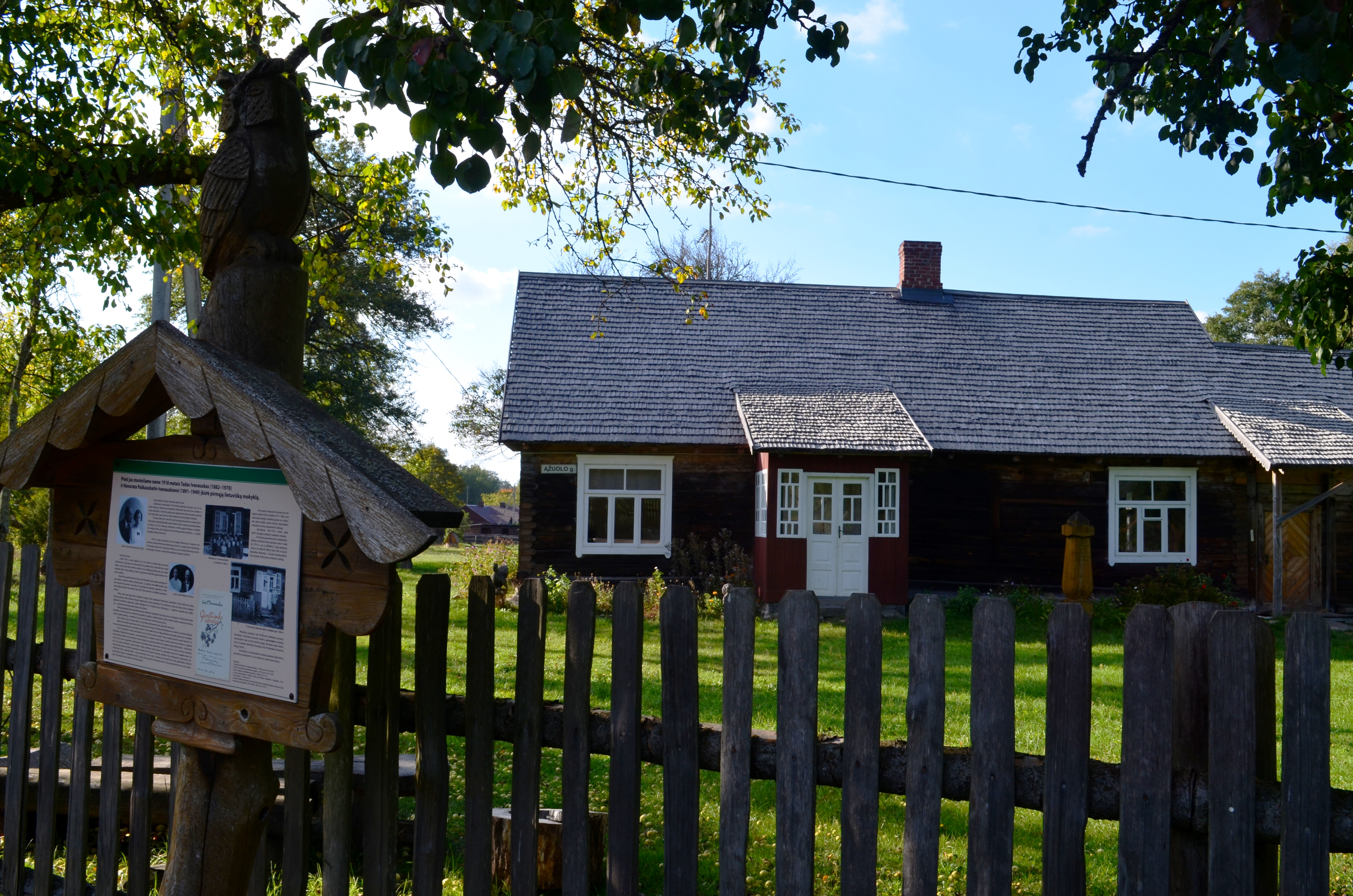
Former school of Musteika

== History ==
Musteika has been known since the 18th century: it was mentioned in 1785 by the Varėna Manor inventory. In 1795, it belonged to the Margionys folwark and had 41 people.

The northern part of Musteika is the older one and till the beginning of the 20th century belonged to Vilna Governorate (Troki County, Merech volost) while the southern one (so called the Averkos' End) is later. It was established by jägers (so called osochniks) from Beržtai village in modern Belarus. This part of Musteika belonged to the Grodno Governorate. The whole region of Musteika was called Gudy Land ('the land of Belarusians') although all the population was Lithuanian.

The main occupations of Musteika's inhabitants were forestry, beekeeping, mushroom and berry picking, hunting, resin extraction.

In 1918, professor Tadas Ivanauskas established first formal Lithuanian school in Musteika. It was later closed by Polish authorities, but later reopened and operated till 1970.

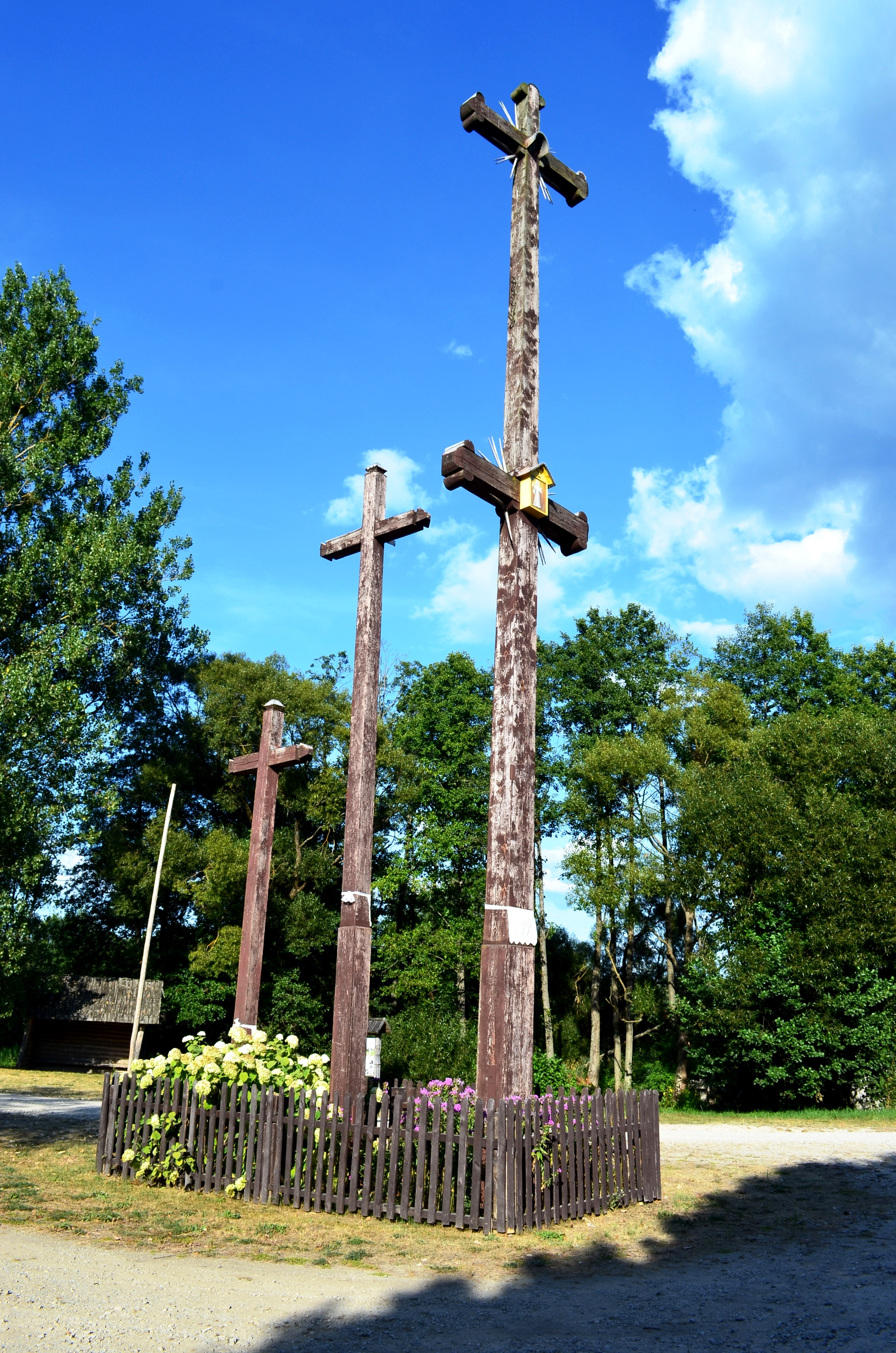
Three crosses in the Musteika center

In 1940, the village shortly belonged to the Byelorussian Soviet Socialist Republic, but later was transferred to Lithuanian Soviet Socialist Republic. The Newly established Musteika kolkhoz was quickly liquidated because of poor soil and Musteika forestry was founded instead. In the 1980s, military polygon established to the south from Musteika but was abandoned after the collapse of the Soviet Union.

In 2006, the Musteika Dzūkish Traditional Beekeeping Museum was founded. Every year it hosts the Week of Living Folk Arts.

== Demography ==
Historical population

Year	Pop.	±%
1959	241	—
1970	224	−7.1%
1979	163	−27.2%
1986	123	−24.5%

Year	Pop.	±%
1989	109	−11.4%
2001	95	−12.8%
2011	61	−35.8%
2021	36	−41.0%

Source: 1959 & 1970, 1979, 1989, 2001, 2011
