= Grybaulia =

- Village
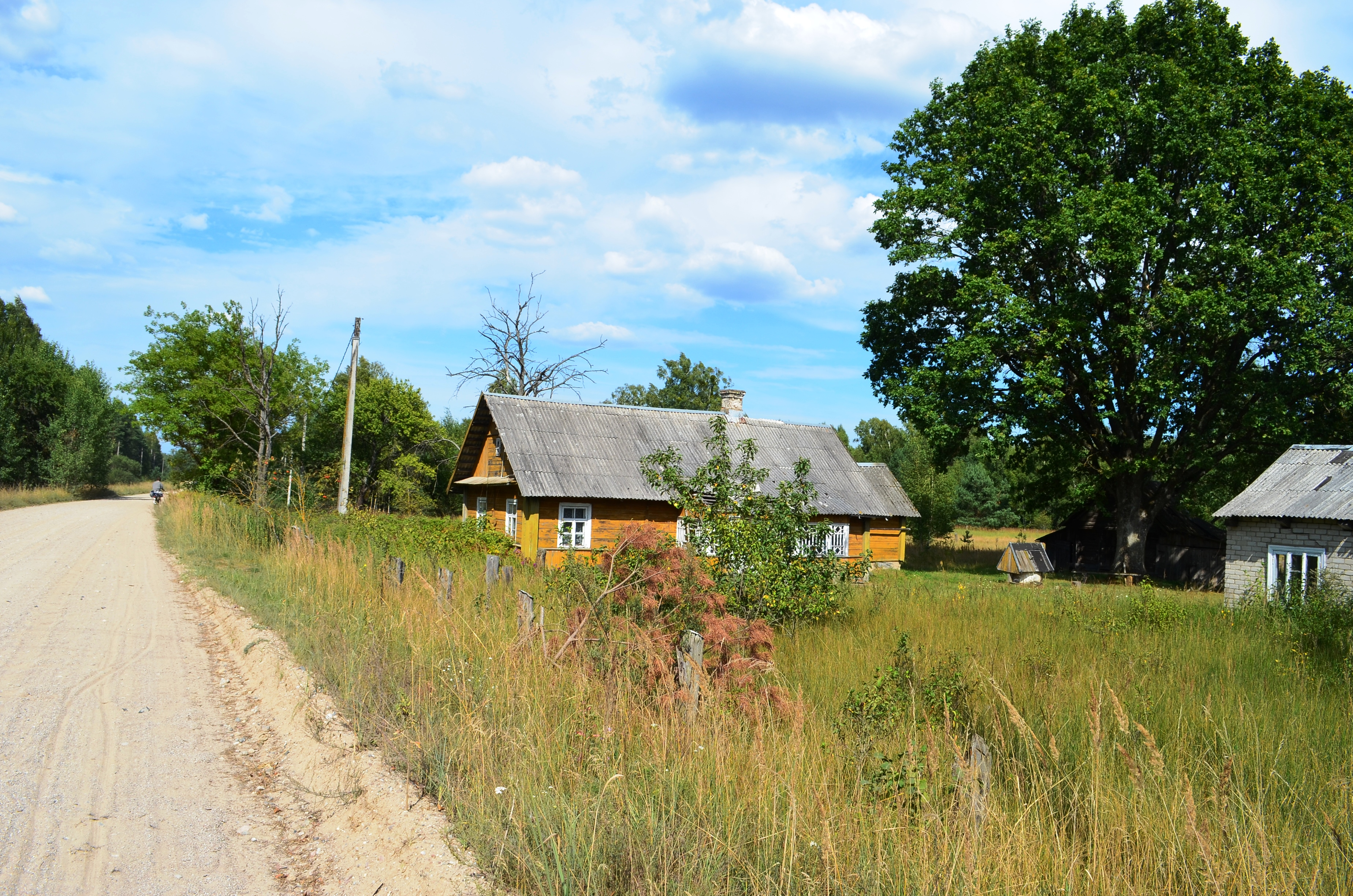
- Street of Grybaulia

- Location of Grybaulia Grybaulia (Lithuania)
- Coordinates: 53°59′58″N 24°21′40″E
- Country: Lithuania
- Ethnographic region: Dzūkija
- County: Alytus County
- Municipality: Varėna district municipality
- Eldership: Marcinkonys eldership

Population (2021)
  - Total: 15
- Time zone: UTC+2 (EET)
  - Summer (DST): UTC+3 (EEST)

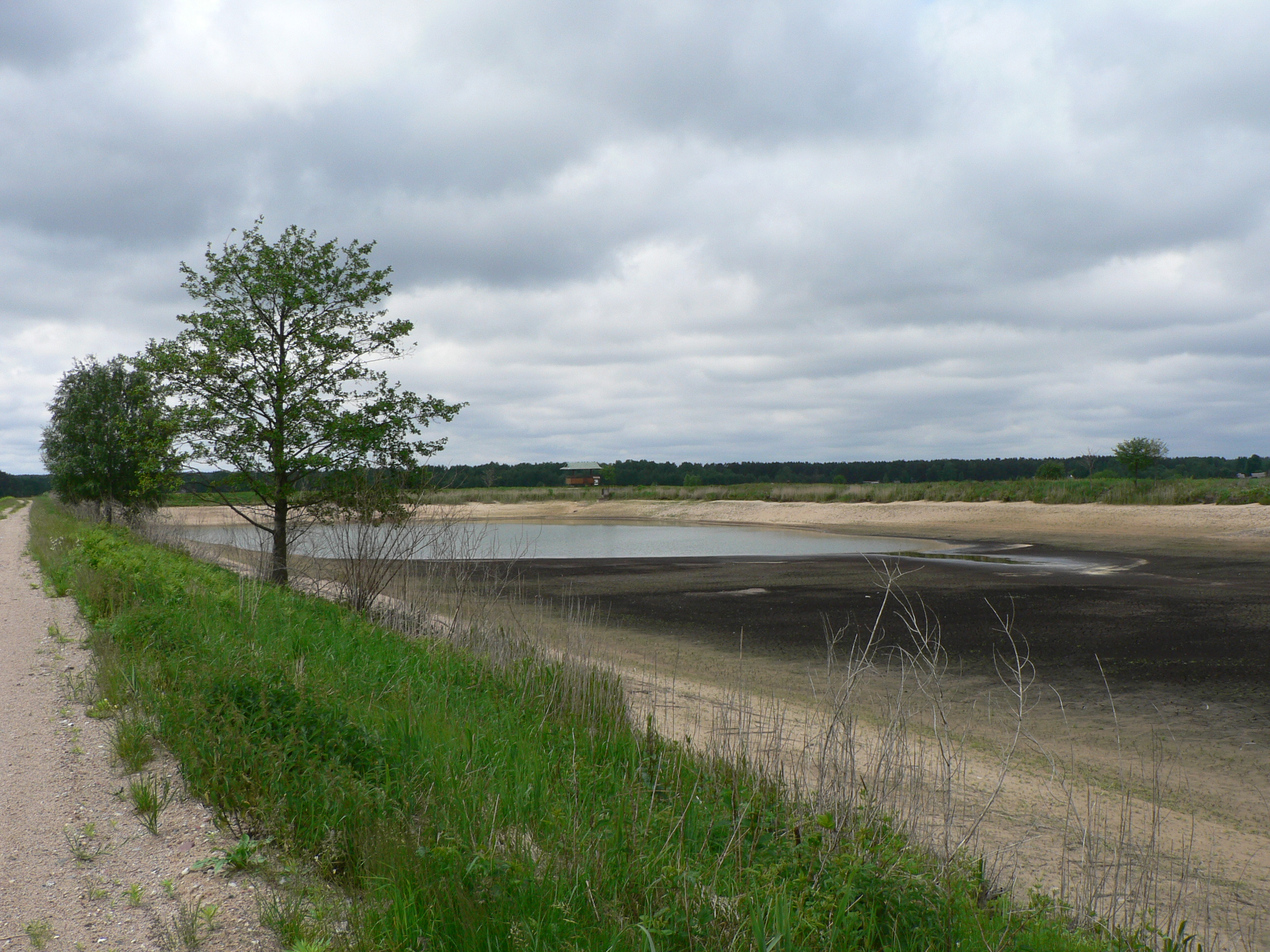
One of the old fish ponds in Grybaulia

Grybaulia is a small village in Dzūkija National Park in Lithuania. The village is best known for its extensive fish ponds, which, surrounded by boreal forests provide breeding, feeding and wintering habitats for a number of bird species.

Grybaulia village is located c. 32 kilometres (20 mi) from Druskininkai, 9 kilometres (5.6 mi) from Marcinkonys, 5 kilometres (3.1 mi) from Musteika (the nearest settlement), 10 kilometres (6.2 mi) from the Belarusian border.

== Etymology ==
The name Grybaulia comes from a word Lithuanian: grybas 'a mushroom' with a Slavic prefix meaning 'a place of [abundant] mushrooms'. During the Interwar period current Grybaulia village was made from two parts called Kanalai ('canals') and Baubliai (from a personal name Baublys which correspondingly comes from a bird name 'bittern').
