= Žeimiai (Varėna) =

- Village

- Location in Lithuania
- Coordinates: 54°04′09″N 24°06′27″E
- Country: Lithuania
- County: Alytus County
- Municipality: Varėna district municipality
- Eldership: Merkinė eldership

Population (2001)
  - Total: 70
- Time zone: UTC+2 (EET)
  - Summer (DST): UTC+3 (EEST)

Žeimiai is a village in Varėna district municipality, in Alytus County, southeastern Lithuania. According to the 2001 census, the village has a population of 70 people. It is situated on the left bank of the Neman River in Dzūkija National Park.
