= Zervynos =

- Village
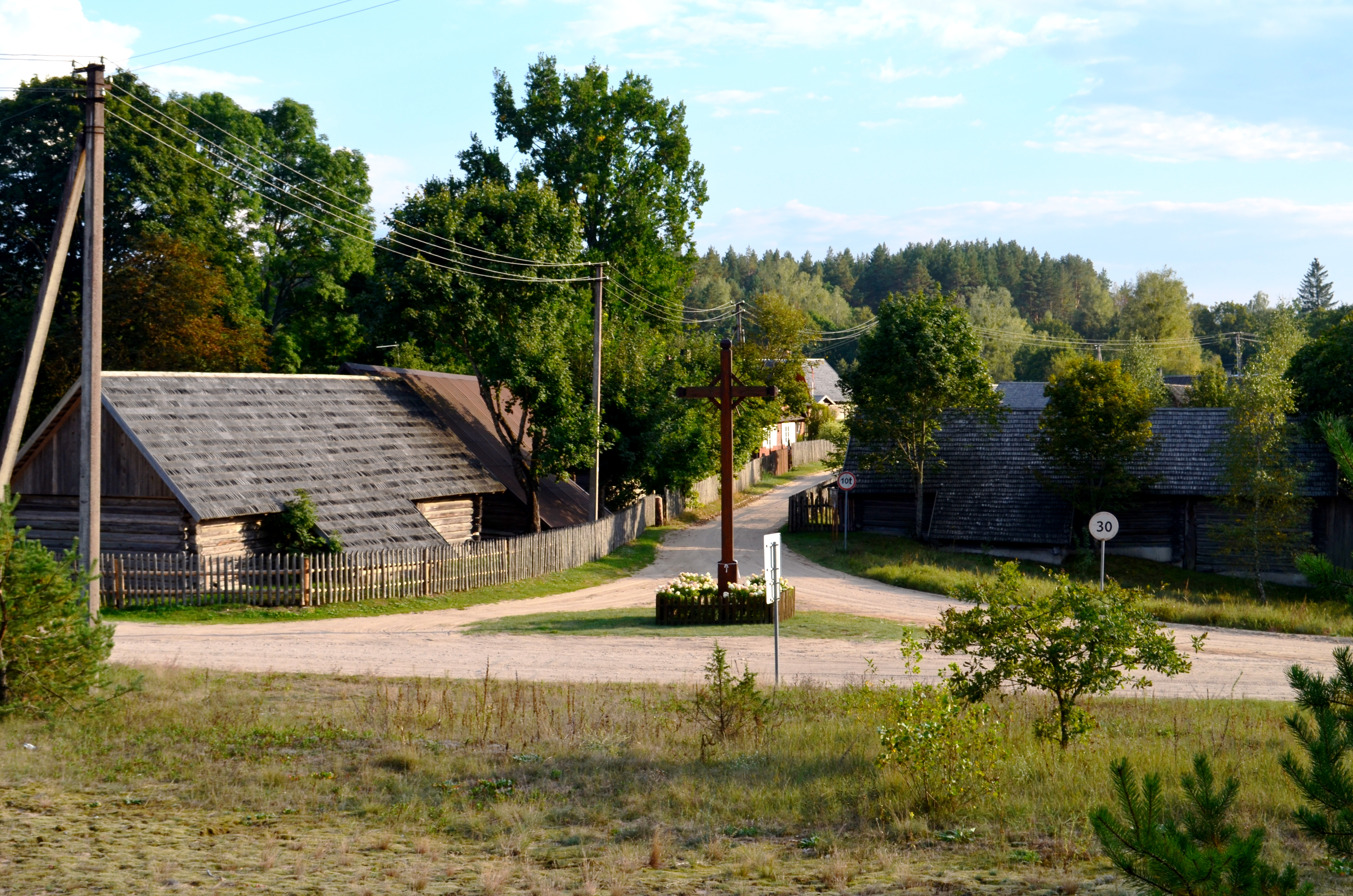
- Zervynos from the cemetery side

- Location of Zervynos
- Coordinates: 54°7′0″N 24°30′0″E
- Country: Lithuania
- Ethnographic region: Dzūkija
- County: Alytus County
- Municipality: Varėna district municipality
- Eldership: Marcinkonys eldership
- First mentioned: 1742

Population (2021)
  - Total: 36
- Time zone: UTC+2 (EET)
  - Summer (DST): UTC+3 (EEST)

Zervynos is an ethnographic village in the Varėna district, Lithuania. It is situated within the territory of the Dzūkija National Park near the Ūla River. The Saint Petersburg–Warsaw Railway runs through this village. Zervynos has 48 homesteads; 8 homesteads and 32 separate buildings are officially declared ethnographic monuments. The village was among the sites short-listed for nomination for the UNESCO World Heritage Site. Though the village is isolated by the Dainava Forest, it is a busy place during summer as tourists kayaking in the Ūla River pass through the settlement.

Zervynos village is located c. 17 kilometres (11 mi) from Varėna, 15 kilometres (9.3 mi) from Marcinkonys, 7 kilometres (4.3 mi) from Pauosupė (the nearest settlement).

== Etymology ==
The name Zervynos is of uncertain origin. There are some lakes in southern Lithuanian called Zervynas, Zervylios. It may be of Sudovian origin and it is possibly a cognate to Lithuanian: žerventi 'to stream rapidly', Russian: жерело, romanized: zherelo 'a river mouth', Ukrainian: жерело, джерело, romanized: zherelo, dzherelo 'a source'. Otherwise, it may be a cognate to Lithuanian: gervė and Semigallian dzerve 'a crane'.

== History ==
Year	Population
1798	104
1858	133
1959	190
1970	169
1979	133
1987	139
2001	67

Zervynos was first mentioned in written sources in 1742. However, 24 campsites, dating from the Stone and Iron Ages, show that people lived in the area for much longer time. Inhabitants were mostly fishers, hunters, gatherers of many of the forest's goods. In the 18th century, the village was divided by the Ūla River: the right bank was in the Varėna eldership of Trakai Voivodeship while the left side was in the Kaniava eldership of Vilnius Voivodeship. The right bank evolved from a village owned by a noble and the left bank from a settlement of forest workers. Combined, both sides had about 10 homesteads and a hundred inhabitants.

== Architecture ==
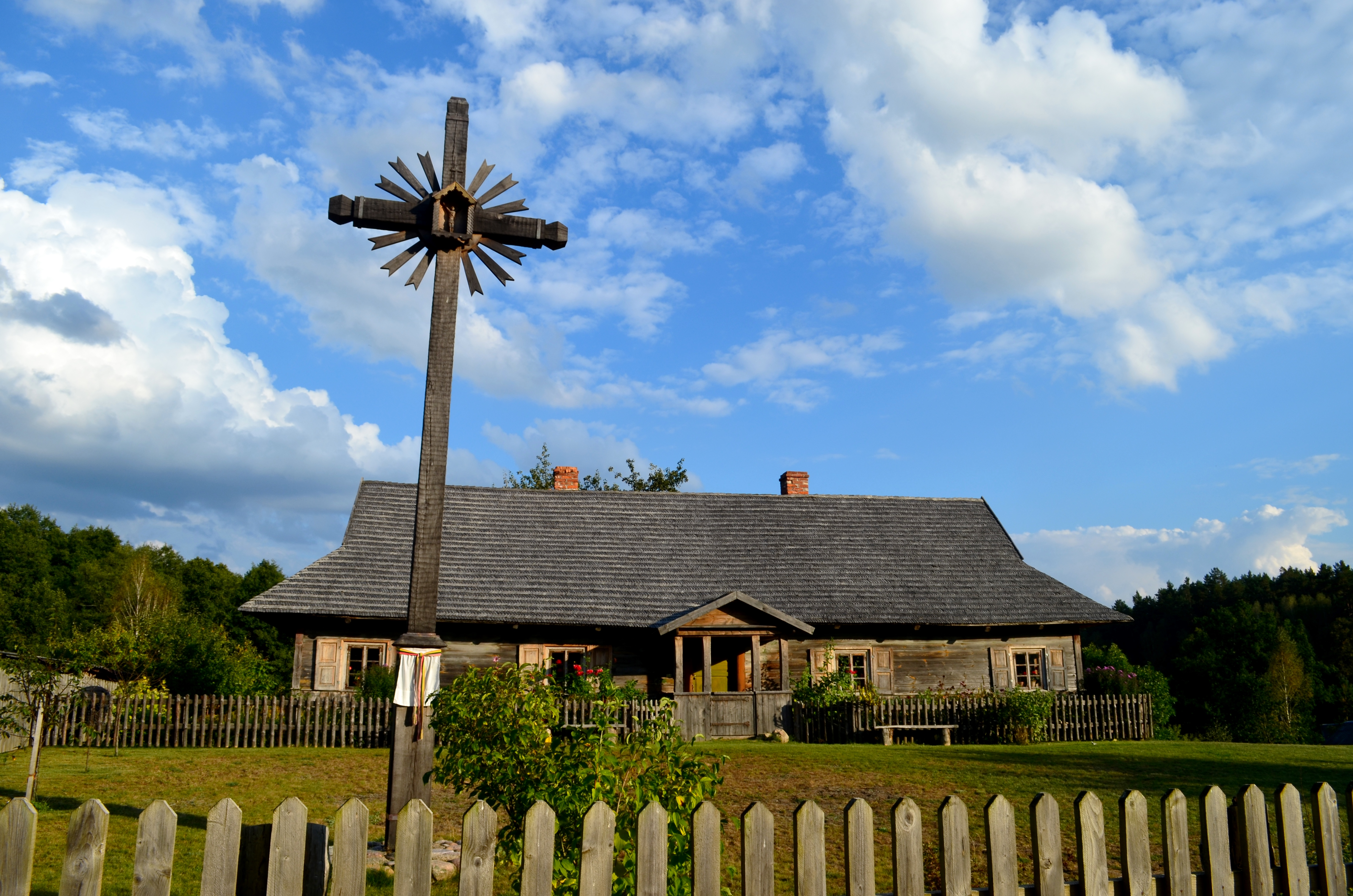
Restored traditional house in Zervynos

The village was untouched by agricultural reforms because it is isolated by forests and sandy soil is unfit for agriculture. Therefore, the village has preserved its original layout from the 18th century. The farm houses are aligned to the central street, running in a narrow strip between the river and slopes of river's valley. Various structures in the homestead are arranged depending on the terrain and size of the plot. All buildings are wooden, constructed mostly from pine logs by the families based on old architectural traditions. Older houses are simple with symmetrical composition and plain exterior. They are divided into three areas: two living rooms at the end and an anteroom and larder in the middle. As family sizes decreased, newer houses replaced one living room with a proper kitchen.

In the middle of the village there is a group of 3 crosses built in different years. Another two crosses are built on the bank of the Ūla River and at a crossroad near the cemetery. Zervynos was one of the earliest subjects of ethnographic expeditions and a monograph, published in 1964 and devoted solely to the village and its heritage, started a trend of localized ethnographic research.

== Culture ==
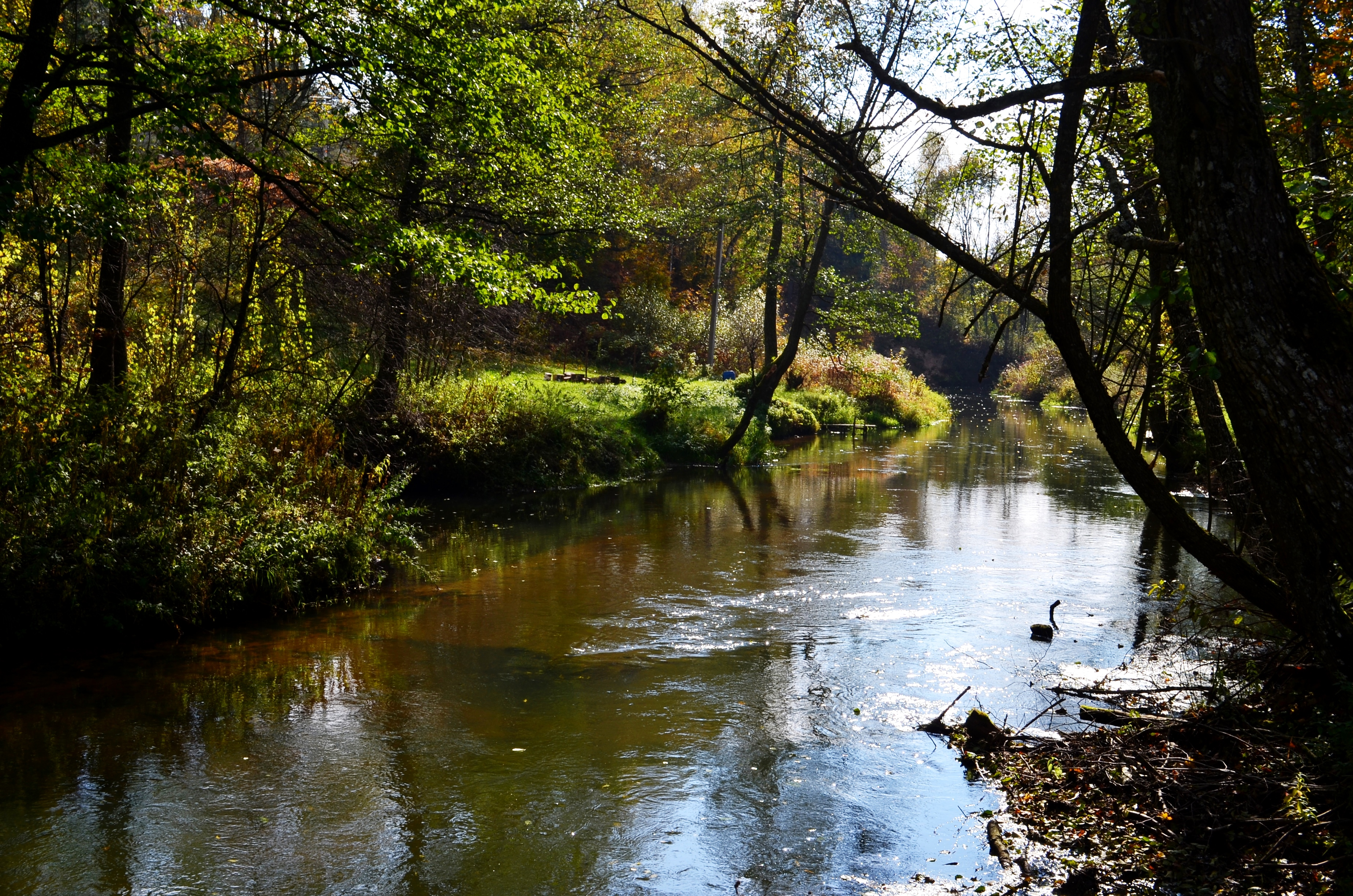
River Ūla near Zervynos

Films Nobody Wanted to Die (1966) about post-World War II resistance and Faktas (Fact, 1981) about Pirčiupiai massacre were filmed in Zervynos. Folk artist Algis Svirnelis, who rebuilt the crosses of Zervynos village lives there, as well as the 2005 Lithuanian National Prize laureate writer Juozas Aputis. In 2001, the villagers hosted annual Mushroom Festival inviting people, including Speaker of the Seimas Artūras Paulauskas and U.S. Ambassador John F. Tefft, to hunt for mushrooms in the surrounding forests. The village is also known for beekeeping: two old pines with hallows for bees are declared natural monuments.
