= Česukai =

- Village
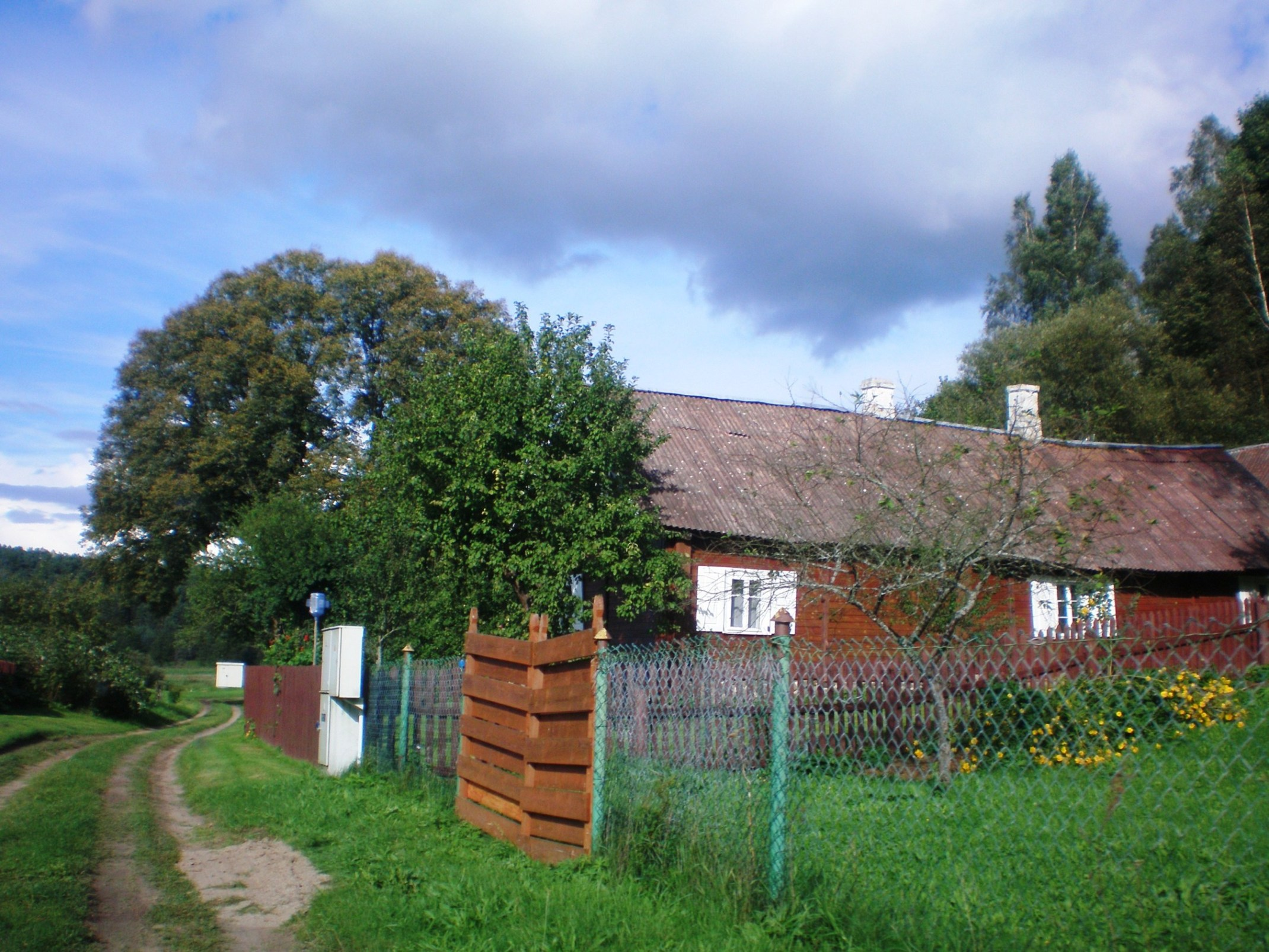

- Location in Lithuania
- Coordinates: 54°09′01″N 24°11′20″E
- Country: Lithuania
- County: Alytus County
- Municipality: Varėna district municipality
- Eldership: Merkinė eldership

Population (2001)
  - Total: 5
- Time zone: UTC+2 (EET)
  - Summer (DST): UTC+3 (EEST)

Česukai is a village in Varėna district municipality, in Alytus County, southeastern Lithuania. According to the 2001 census, the village has a population of 5 people. The village is located 1 km south to Merkinė, between Nemunas and Merkys rivers, at Dzūkija National Park. Česukai is surrounded by a pine forest and it is only reachable by a forest road which branches from Vilnius-Hrodno highway.

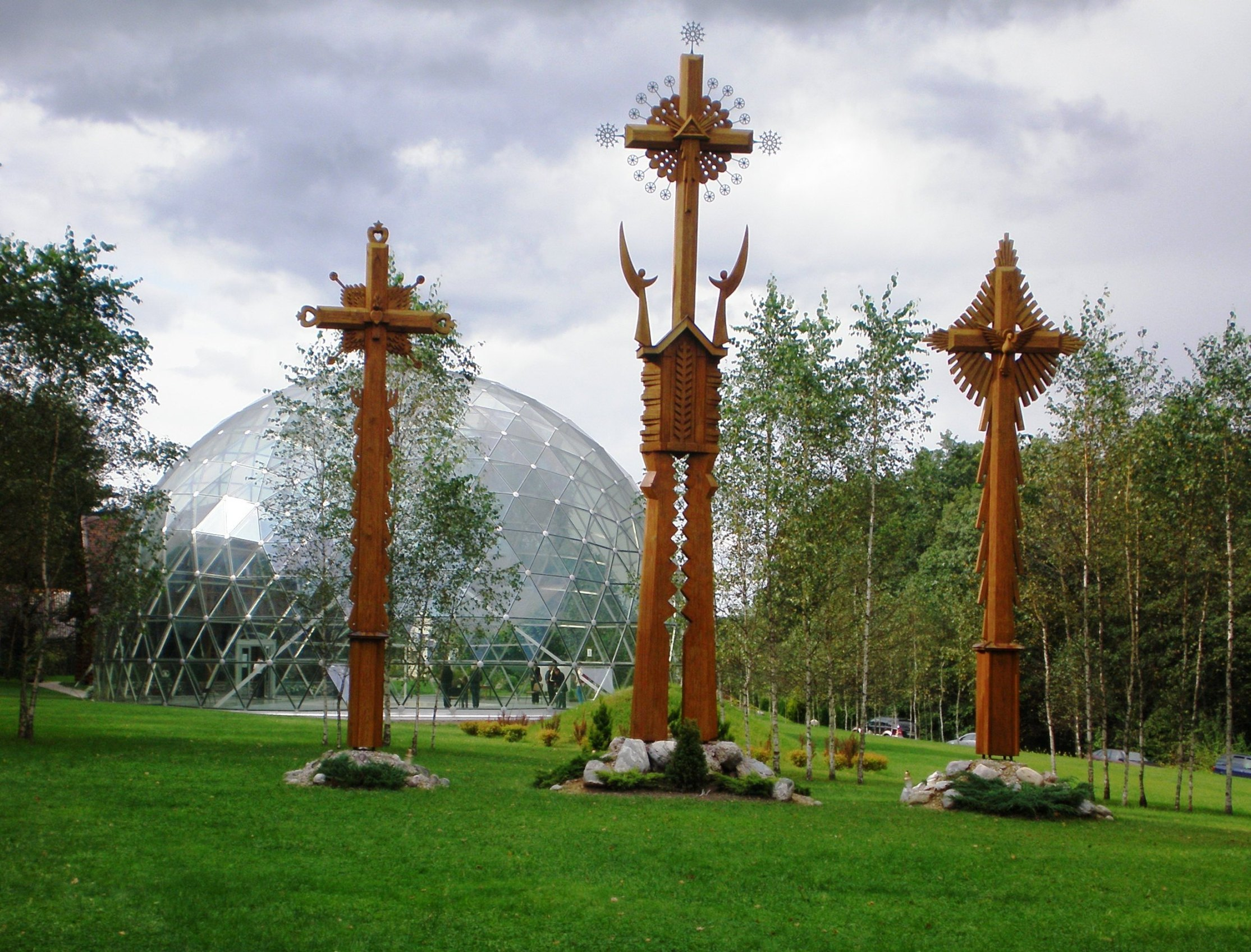
Česukai pyramid

Česukai is famous for its bioenergetic pyramid built by a local resident, Povilas Žėkas. It is on the site of where he had a mystical experience as a child of seven on 20 August 1990. It attracts a broad range of people such as Laima Paksienė, wife of Rolandas Paksas, who goes there every two weeks sometimes with her whole family. She participated in a campaign to save the pyramid from demolition when this was proposed by Lithuanian officials. Many people visit this place believing that this pyramid has healing powers.
