= Brayut Tourist Village =

Brayut is a village designated as a "tourist village" located in Ngaglik district of Sleman Regency in Yogyakarta Special Region, in the Republic of Indonesia.

The concept of a tourist village in Indonesia is generally a rural area with particular characteristics that identify it as a potential or actual tourist destination. Brayut began to develop as a tourism village in 1995. Brayut village is a tourist village that highlights the local culture, especially in relation to agriculture. This is not surprising given that the majority of the population of Brayut make a living from farming.
