= Desa Wisata Sermo =

Village in Yogyakarta, Indonesia

Coordinates: 7.82506°S 110.11034°E

Desa Wisata Sermo (Sermo Tourist Village) is a small village located adjacent to Waduk Sermo (Sermo Dam), the main water source of Hargowilis, Kecamatan Kokap, Kabupaten Kulon Progo. Desa Wisata Sermo is located approximately 35 km west of Yogyakarta and only 7 km from Wates, the capital city of Kulon Progo Regency.

The village is surrounded by a mountain range which includes a conservation area where hunting and logging are prohibited. The village is situated next to Waduk Sermo (Sermo Dam), the only dam in Yogyakarta.

== Culture, arts, and traditional customs ==
The community of Desa Wisata Sermo continue to practise traditional Javanese arts such as jatilan, ketoprak, wayang kulit, and incling. The community still practises religious arts such as sholawat and berjanjen.

== Local cuisine ==
The traditional foods of Desa Wisata Sermo are made by the local people and then sold in the surrounding areas. The traditional foods include the following:

- geblek – made from cassava
- nila (fried or grilled) – fish caught in Sermo Dam
- apem – made from coconut rice
- bakpao
- bolu kelapa
- rempeyek kacang and kedelai
- Red Devil Crisp – made from the Red Devil fish which lives in Waduk Sermo

== Tourism ==
Tourist attractions in the village include the following:

- Waduk Sermo
- boat tours of Waduk Sermo
- fishing
- gazebos
- an 18.8 km road which circles the dam
- 5 km walking track which passes through the rainforest, the village houses, a small river, an asphalt road, and a walking path
- cottage industry tours of local products and arts
- 13 homestays
- regular performances of traditional arts such as jatilan, incling, and ketoprak.
