= Rudnia (Kaniava) =

- Village
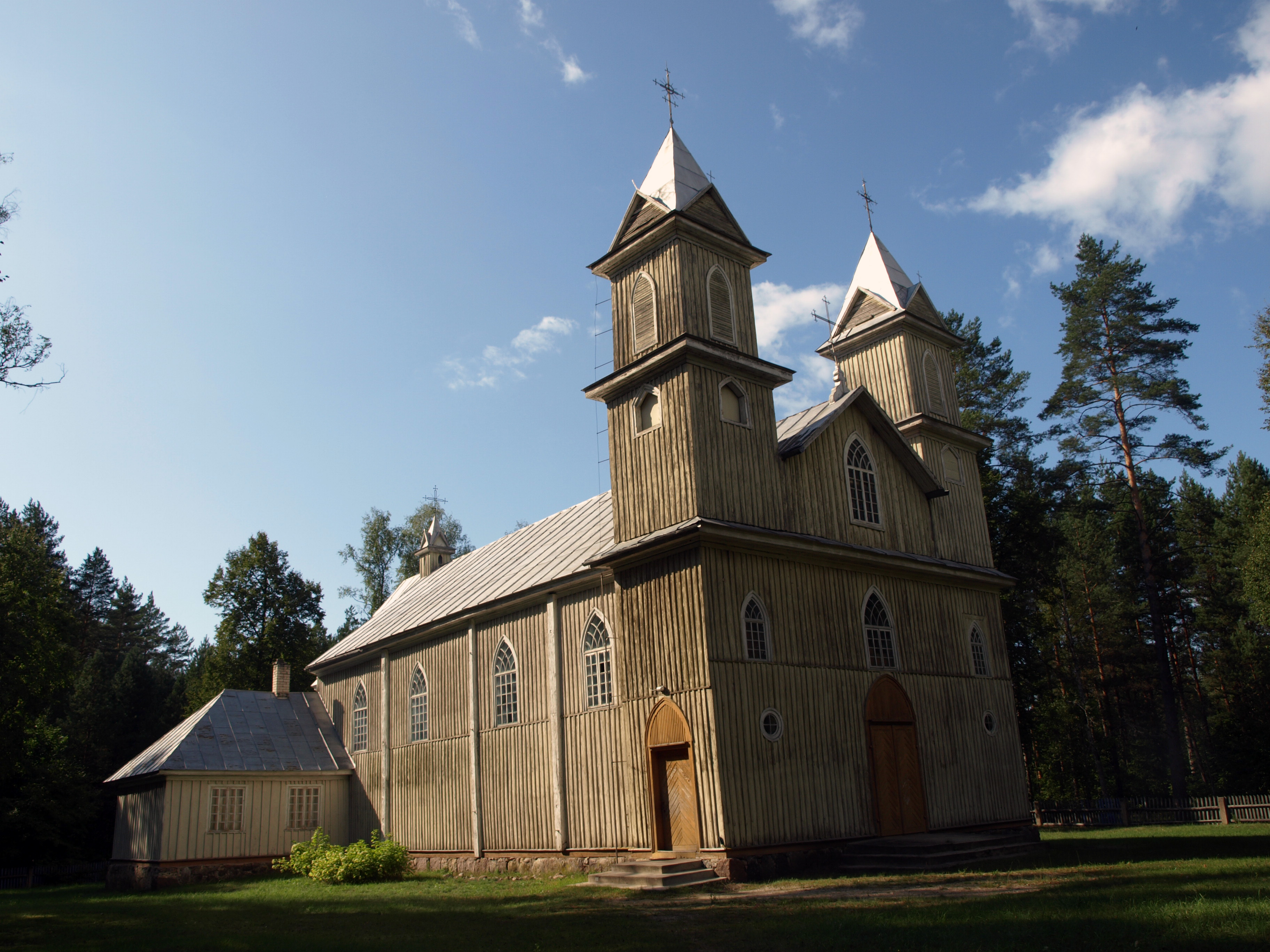

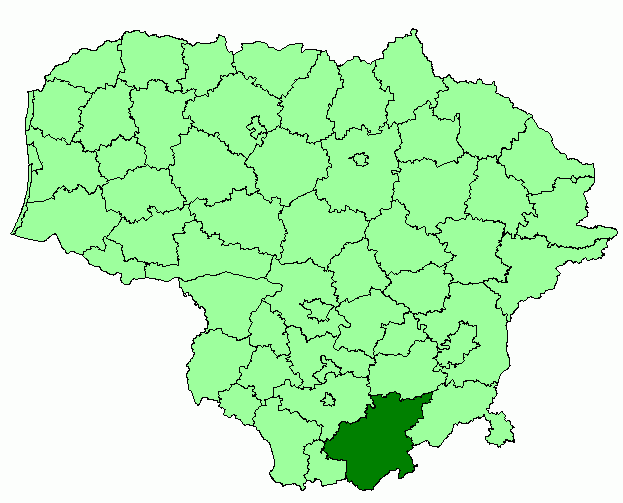
- Location in Varėna district municipality Location of Varėna district in Lithuania
- Coordinates: 54°04′08″N 24°40′08″E
- Country: Lithuania
- County: Alytus
- Municipality: Varėna
- Eldership: Kaniavos (Kaniava)

Population (2011 Census)
  - Total: 74
- Time zone: UTC+2 (EET)
  - Summer (DST): UTC+3 (EEST)

Rudnia is a village in Kaniavos eldership, Varėna district municipality, Alytus County, southeastern Lithuania. According to the 2001 census, the village has a population of 108 people. At the 2011 census, the population was 74.

== Etymology ==
The name Rudnia comes from the word Lithuanian: rudnia (a borrowing from Belarusian: рудня) which means 'a bog iron smelter'.
