= Ethnographic village =

Settlement portraying characteristics of ethnic group

An ethnographic village is a real or artificial settlement which portrays historical and ethnographic characteristics of life of a certain ethnic group. The concept is close to that of an open-air museum or "living museum."

== Ethnographic village exhibitions ==
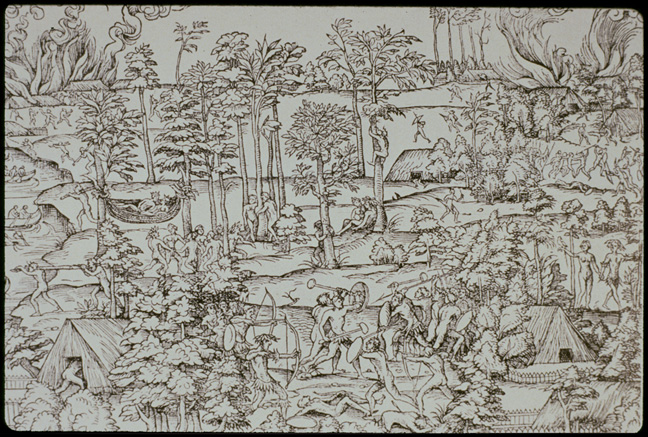
Brazilian village, Rouen, France.

As early as in 1550 a mock Brazilian village was built by Rouen, France, on an occasion of the entry of king Henry II of France. For this purpose, Brazilian flora and fauna were imported, and typical Amerindian dwellings were built. The village was populated by 50 original Tabajara and Tupinambá people as well as about 250 French dressed as "natives". For Henry II's royal entry on September 29, the "villagers" presented a tableau of enactments of Tupinambá daily life and a "mock battle between the Tupinambá and the Tabajara," which ended "with the defeat of the Tabajara" and the burning of one of the structures in the village. This was repeated the following day for Catherine de Medici.

Similar "Negro villages" have become increasingly common in various places, becoming a staple feature of international exhibitions of late 19th-early 20th centuries, such as the 1889 Paris Exposition.

Since these villages commonly emphasized the backwards, "savage" ways of life as compared to European civilization, the concept was criticized as a manifestation of racism.

== Real settlements ==
=== Lithuania ===
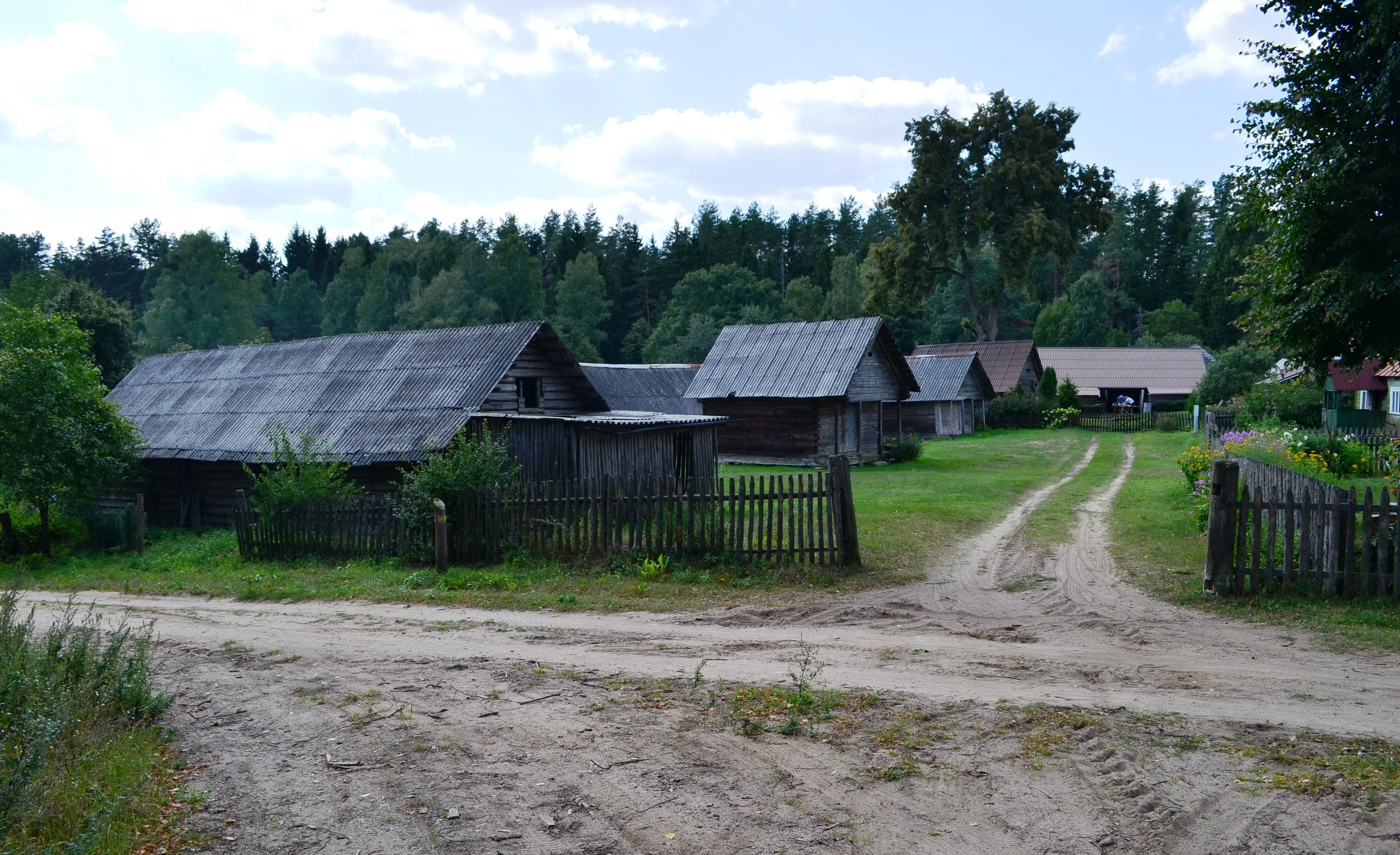
Ethnographic village of Zervynos

In modern Lithuania, an ethnographic village (Lithuanian: etnografinis kaimas) is defined as a rural settlement which maintains traditional, historical, ethnic cultural characteristics specific to the particular region. These characteristic include traditional architecture, farmstead planning, relation to the natural landscape, as well as traditional life, including farming traditions, arts and crafts.

== See also ==
- Ethnographic group
- Thematic village
- Tourist village (Indonesia)
- Historical reconstruction
