= Tourist village (Indonesia) =

In Indonesia, a tourist village (desa wisata) is a village officially designated as one that welcomes tourism. In the Special Region of Yogyakarta (which includes the Sleman Regency), the concept was embraced around 2000 with dozens of villages being dubbed as tourist villages.

According to a 2009 report in The Jakarta Post there were 48 tourist villages listed in Yogyakarta, though only ten were actually operating as such, including: Kebonagung, Manding, Krebet, Kasongan (Bantul), Trumpon, Turgo, Ketingan, Brayut, Gamplong (Sleman), Sermo and Bobung (Gunungkidul). The designation as a "tourist village" may not mean that the village is actually developed for tourism, but that it is believed the potential for tourism exists.

Nearby Mount Merapi helped encourage a number of villages to be named tourist villages.
