= Dzūkija National Park =

National park in Lithuania

- IUCN category II (national park)
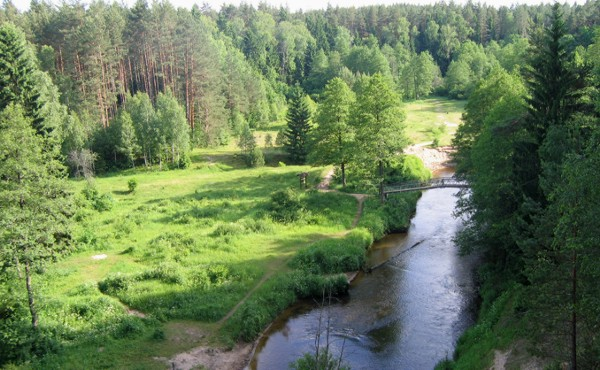
- Ūla River in Dzūkija National Park

- Location within Lithuania
- Interactive map of Dzūkija National Park
- Location: Lithuania
- Nearest city: Varėna
- Coordinates: 54°04′55″N 24°22′36″E
- Area: 584.53 km^{2} (225.69 sq mi)
- Established: 1991
- Visitors: 30,000

Dzūkija National Park is a national park in Dzūkija, Lithuania, located 100 kilometers southwest from the capital, Vilnius, and 100 kilometers south from Kaunas. It was established on April 23, 1991 by the Supreme Court of the Republic of Lithuania. The park was established to protect and manage the territories of the Dainava land. The park mainly consists of marsh areas, lakes, rivers, swamps, inland dunes, and mountain-ridges and is the country's most extensive and protected forest. The national park encompasses 584.53 square kilometers on the banks of the Nemunas River.

The park belongs to both the Association of Baltic National Parks and the Federation of European National Parks.

== Features ==
The park enjoys a more continental climate than other parts of the country. The average temperature in January drops to -5.4 °C and rises to +17.7 °C in July. Most of the territory in Dzūkija National Park is covered by forests dominated by pine and other trees, such as birch, spruce, and alder grove. The park contains 30 different rivers and streams and belongs to the Nemunas river basin. South of Dzūkija National Park is the Čepkeliai Marsh Reserve, which is the largest bog in Lithuania. Its most distinctive landscapes are the mainland dune massifs, located in Marcinkonys, Lynežeris, Grybaulia, and Šunupis.

== Tourism ==
Entry to Dzūkija National Park is free, but some activities require permits, such as kayaking, angling, and entry into the Čepkeliai Marsh Reserve. Other tourism activities include berry and mushroom foraging, hiking, and bicycling.

== Settlements ==
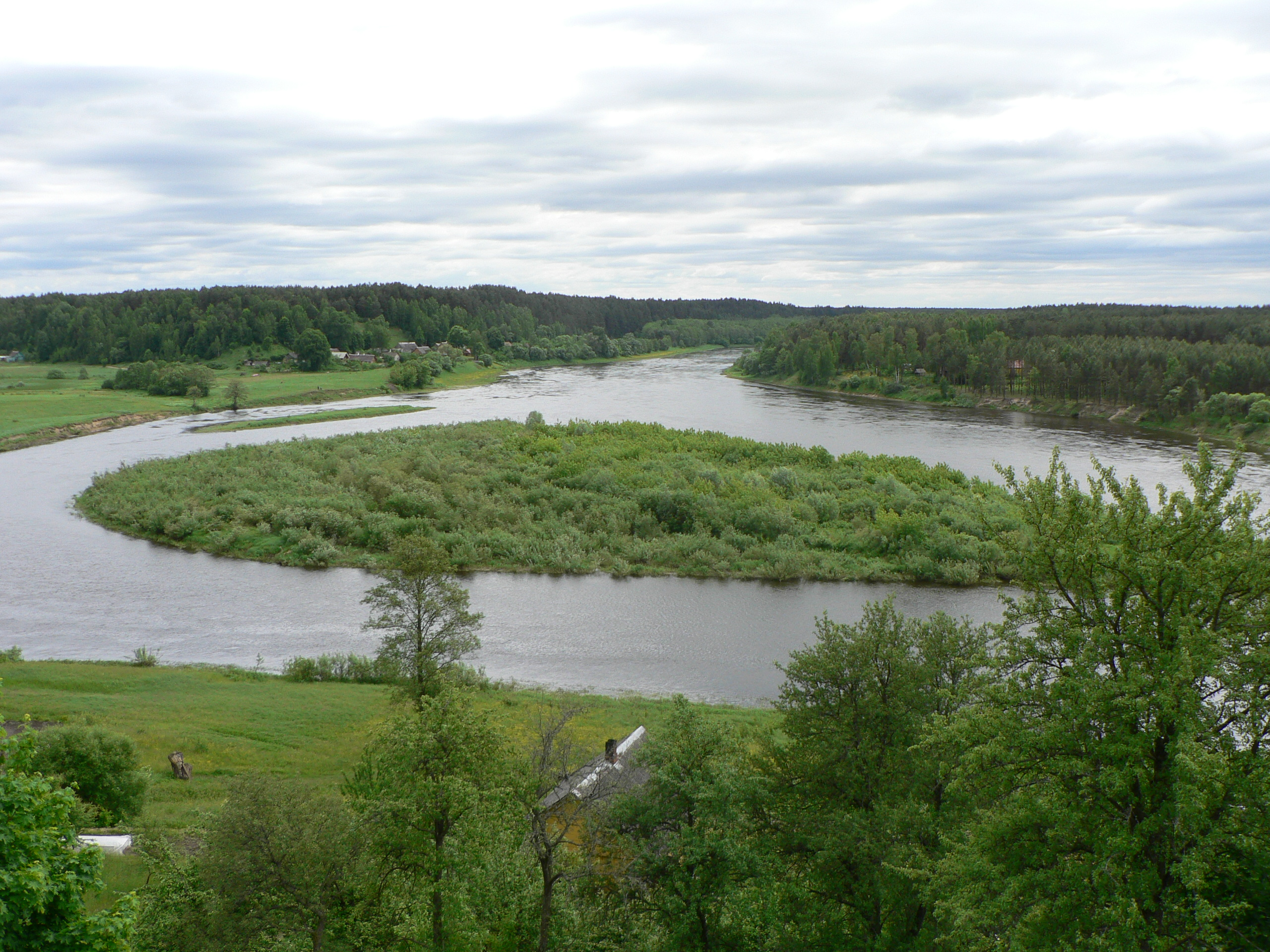
Nemunas near Merkinė

The administrative center of the park is in Marcinkonys and the other important town is Merkinė. The ethnographic village of Zervynos can be found within the park.

== See also ==
- List of national parks in the Baltics
