= Kabeliai =

- Village
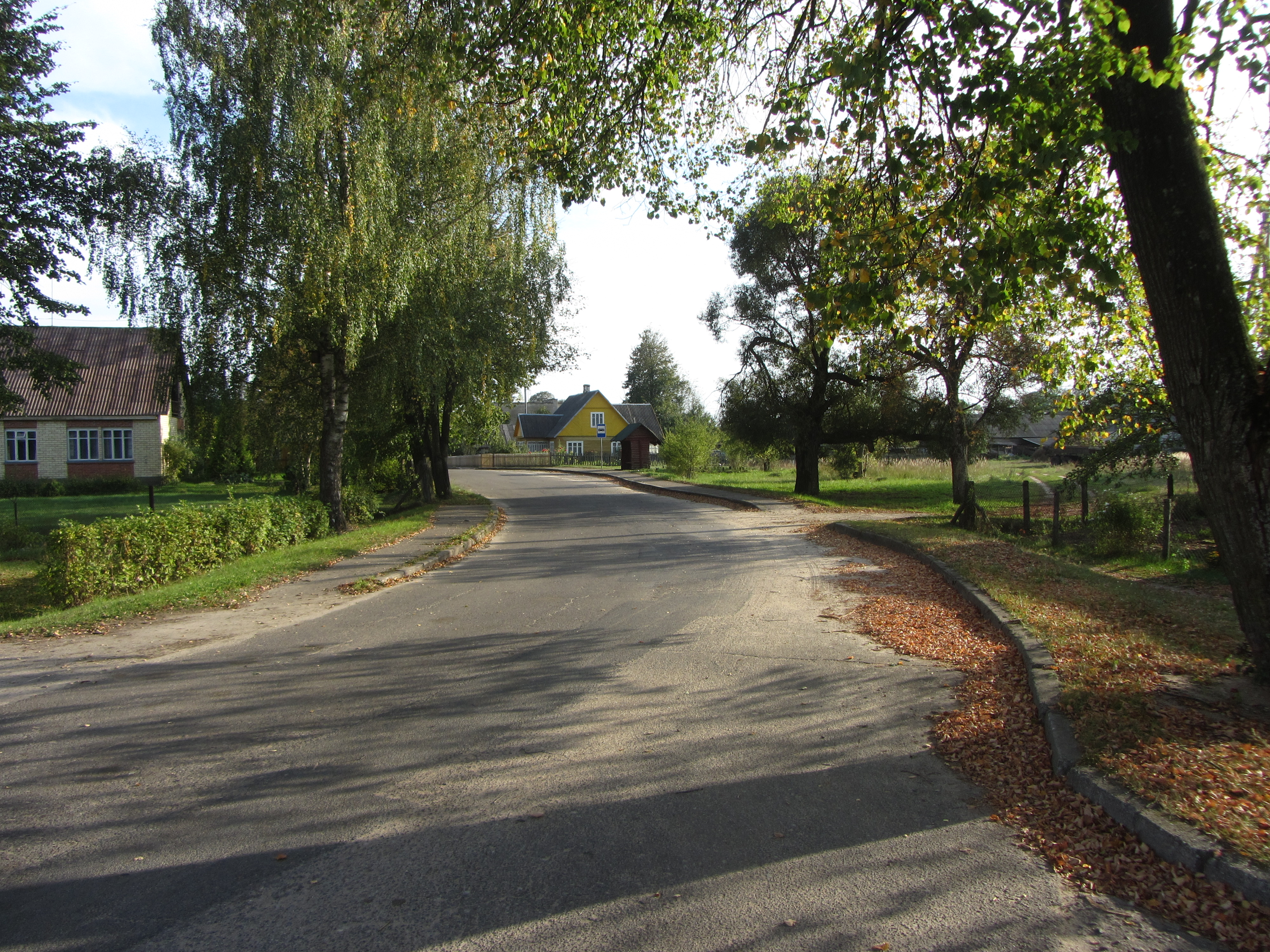
- Street of Kabeliai

- Location within Varėna District Municipality Location within Lithuania
- Country: Lithuania
- County: Alytus County
- Municipality: Varėna district municipality

Population (2021)
  - Total: 122
- Time zone: UTC+2 (EET)
  - Summer (DST): UTC+3 (EEST)

Kabeliai is a village in Varėna district municipality, in Alytus County, in southeastern Lithuania. According to the 2011 census, the village has a population of 168 people.

According to the 1921 census, the village was inhabited by 258 people, among whom 240 were Roman Catholic, 4 Orthodox, and 14 Mosaic. At the same time, 8 inhabitants declared Polish nationality, 1 Belarusian, 14 Jewish and 235 Lithuanian. There were 44 residential buildings in the village.

In the years 1921-1945 the village was within the borders of Poland.

Kabeliai village is located c. 24 kilometres (15 mi) from Druskininkai, 19 kilometres (12 mi) from Marcinkonys, 1 kilometre (0.62 mi) from Ašašninkai (the nearest settlement) and 2 kilometres (1.2 mi) from the Belarusian border.

== Demographics ==
Historical population

| Year | Pop. | ±% |
|---|---|---|
| 1959 | 278 | — |
| 1979 | 259 | −6.8% |
| 1989 | 255 | −1.5% |

| Year | Pop. | ±% |
|---|---|---|
| 2001 | 229 | −10.2% |
| 2011 | 168 | −26.6% |
| 2021 | 122 | −27.4% |

Source: 1959, 1979, 1989, 2001, 2011

== Etymology ==
The name Kabeliai is of unclear origin. It may be from a Lithuanian personal name Kabẽlis which is known only from Panevėžys region and possibly comes from a word Lithuanian: kabelis ('a hang, a crook, a gaff'). Otherwise, it could be from Slavic personal names Polish: Kabel, Kobiel, Kobel, Kobil, Belarusian: Кобель which descent from Belarusian: кабель, кобель 'a male wolf, a male dog, a womaniser'. It could be directly from this word as it is said that Kabeliai was a hunting dog breeding place. Finally, Belarusian: кобялка, Polish: kobiałka mean 'a basket', so it could mean 'a basket weathers' place'.
