= Čepkeliai Marsh =

Nature reserve in Lithuania

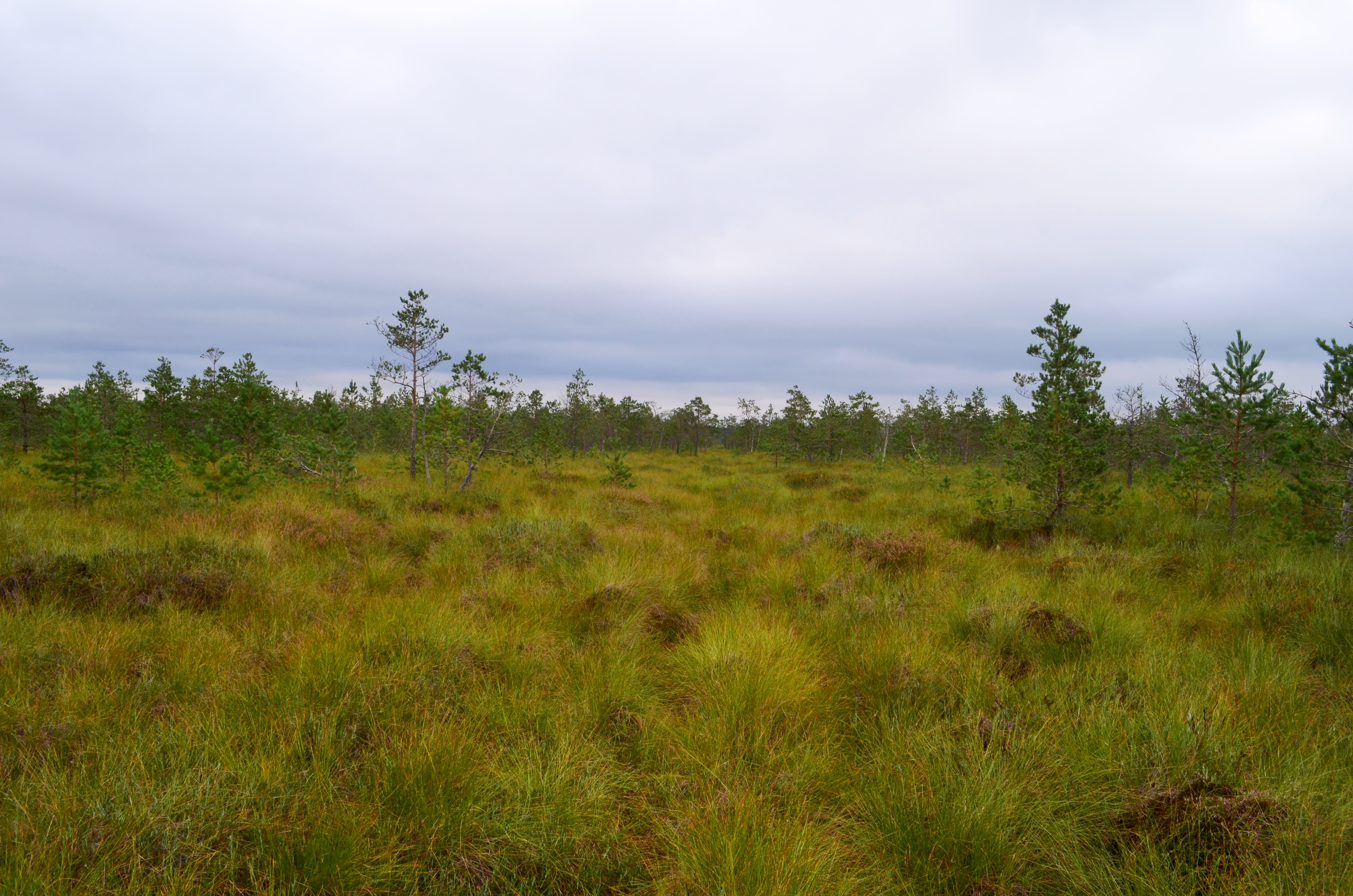
- Čepkeliai marsh

- Location within Lithuania
- Location: Varėna District Municipality, Lithuania
- Coordinates: 54°0′N 24°31′E
- Area: 11,212 ha (27,710 acres)

Ramsar Wetland
- Official name: Čepkeliai mire
- Designated: 20 August 1993
- Reference no.: 625

Ramsar Wetland
- Official name: Kotra
- Designated: 21 October 2002
- Reference no.: 1216

The Čepkeliai Marsh (Lithuanian: Čepkelių raistas) is the largest bog (a mire) in Lithuania. Located in Varėna District Municipality, south of Marcinkonys village and north of Kotra River, which flows along the Belarus–Lithuania border in this area. Its area is a nature reserve and a Ramsar site.

== Protected status ==
The area of the swamp is protected as a state nature reserve (Čepkēliai Reserve), with its administration in Marcinkonys, and part of the cross-border wetlands of international importance, the Kotra-Cepkeliai Transboundary Ramsar Site established in 2010. It consists of the Kotra Ramsar site in Belarus (designated in 2002) and the Čepkeliai Mire Ramsar site in Lithuania (designated in 1993). In 2011 the Čepkeliai Nature Reserve together with Dzūkija National Park were certified as PAN parks.

The bog itself covers an area of 5,858 hectares (14,480 acres), while the larger area of 11,212 hectares (27,710 acres) which also includes some neighbouring sections of the Dainava Forest is declared as the Čepkeliai Nature Reserve. It was created in 1975, and is protected since 1960 (initially as a botanical-zoological sanctuary). It is also part of Natura 2000, the European ecological network.

== Nature ==
Most of Čepkeliai is a raised bog while there are some smaller areas of a fen and flooded forests. There are 21 small bog lakes in the area, some of them are Glacial Age relicts, remnants of larger lakes that have been swamped. The largest of them is the Ešerinis. The peat stratum is 5–6 metres thick.

It grows a lot of cranberries, wild rosemary, and heather. The reserve is a sanctuary for cranes, white-tailed eagles, black grouse, capercaillie, mountain hares, martens, smooth snakes.

== Visiting ==
The Čepkeliai Marsh is closed for visiting, except from the observation tower and an educational trail by the edge of the marsh south to Marcinkonys village. The track was closed since June 2021. Cranberry and mushroom picking is allowed for 10 days in early September for residents of the nearby villages with a permit, for personal use only.

== Etymology ==
The name Čepkeliai comes from a personal name Lithuanian: *Čepkus, *Čepkelis, i. e. Čepkáuskas, Čepkẽvičius, Polish: Czepka, Czepko, Belarusian: Чепко, romanized: Čepko, which is a form of name Szczepan. As at the beginning of 20th century, this name was used only for small western part of the bog. The main part was called Polish: Ruska Puszcza ("Russian woodland") in Slavic maps. The local Lithuanian name for this swampy and forested region was Gudo Šalis ("The Land of Gud").

== Gallery ==
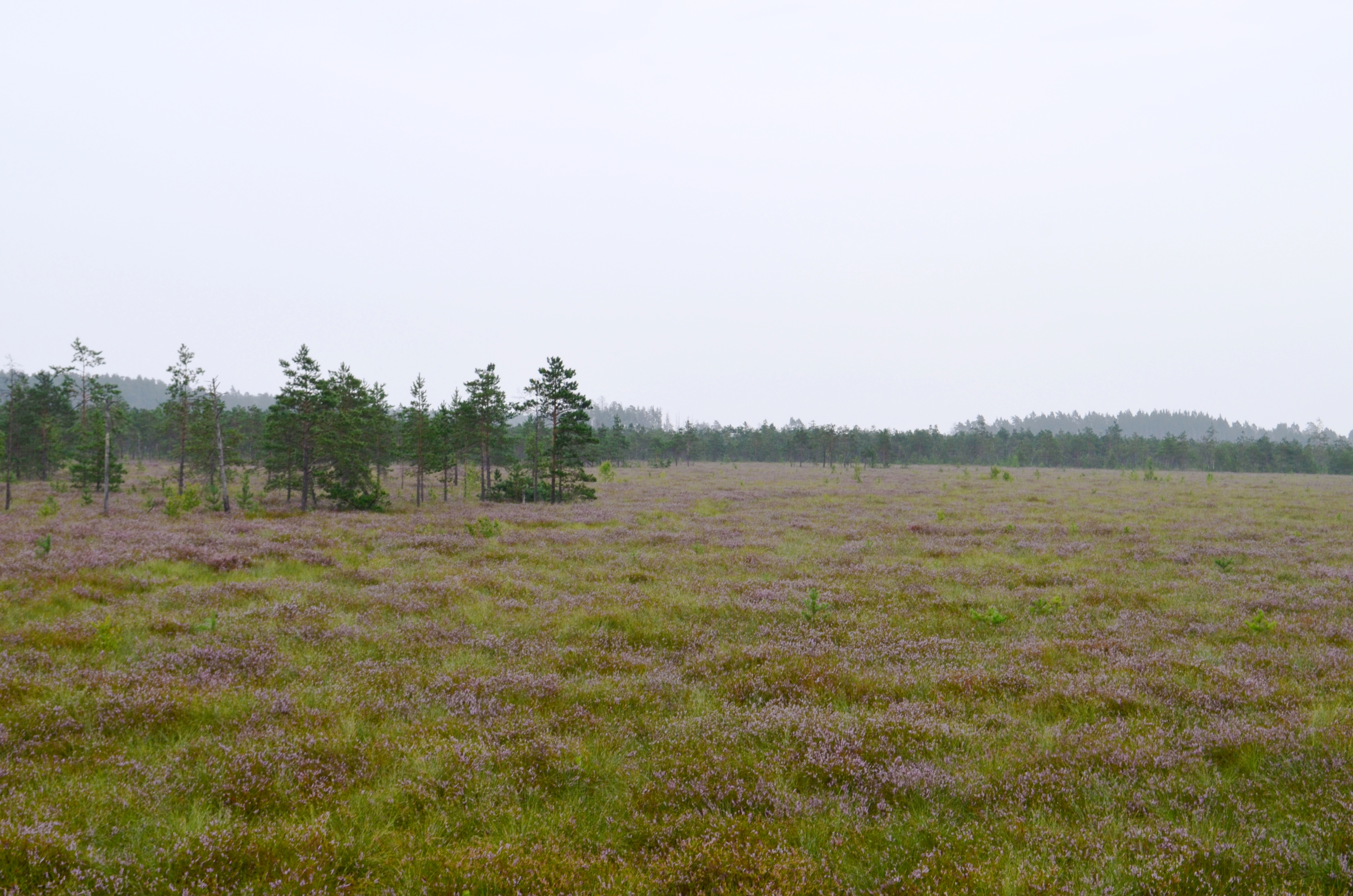
A heath in Čepkeliai

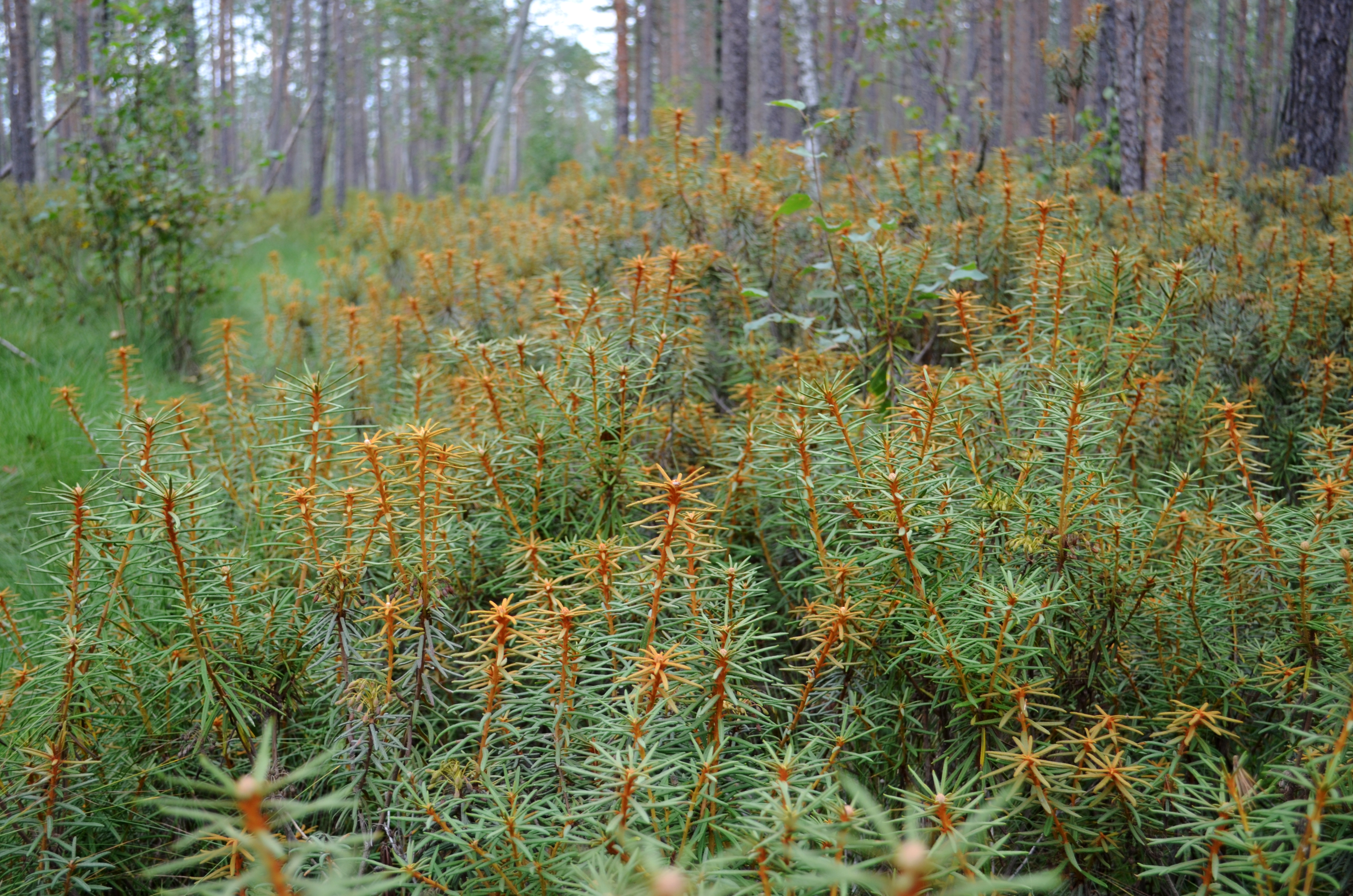
Wild rosemaries

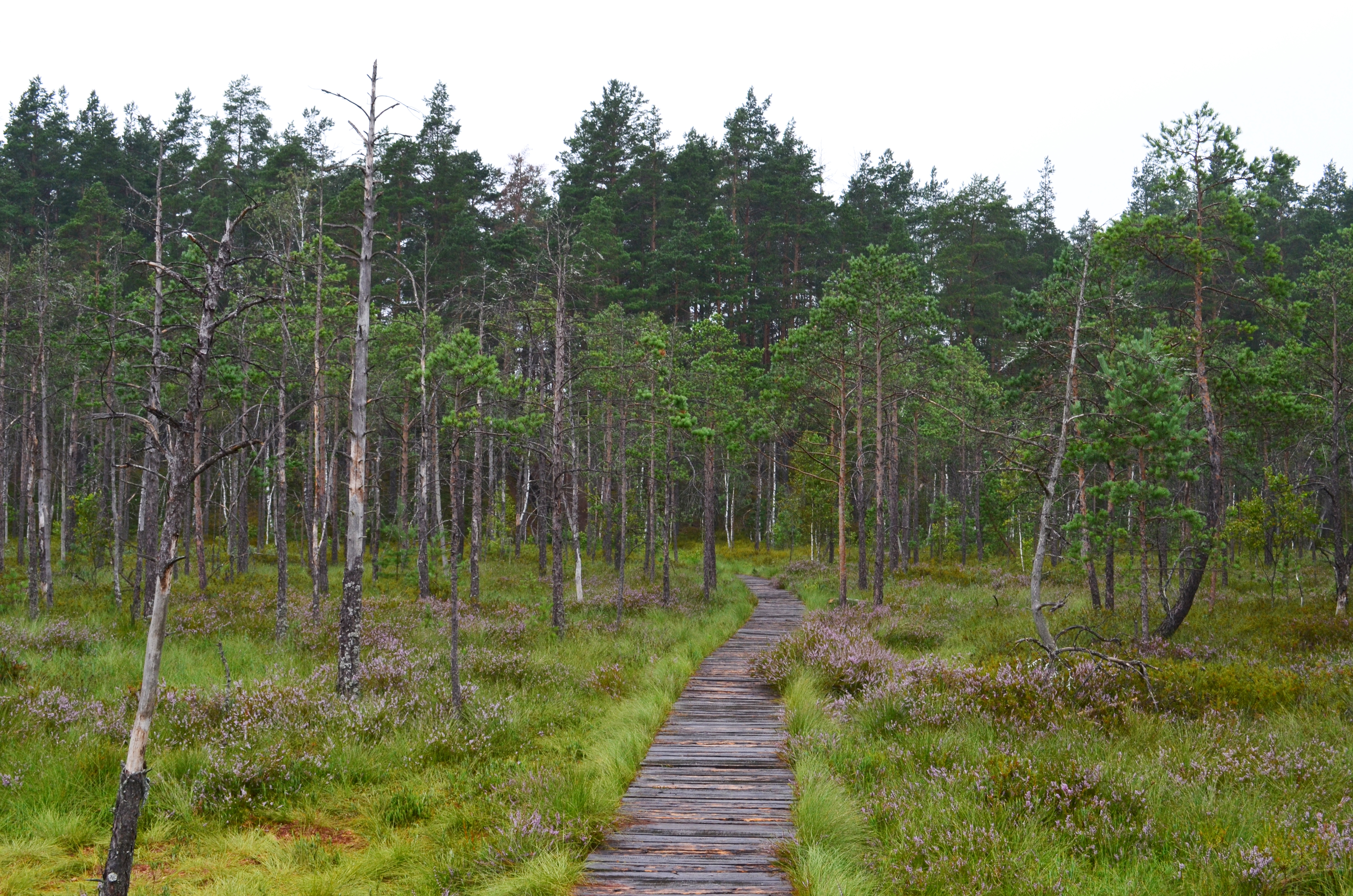
Pine forest by the edge of the raised bog

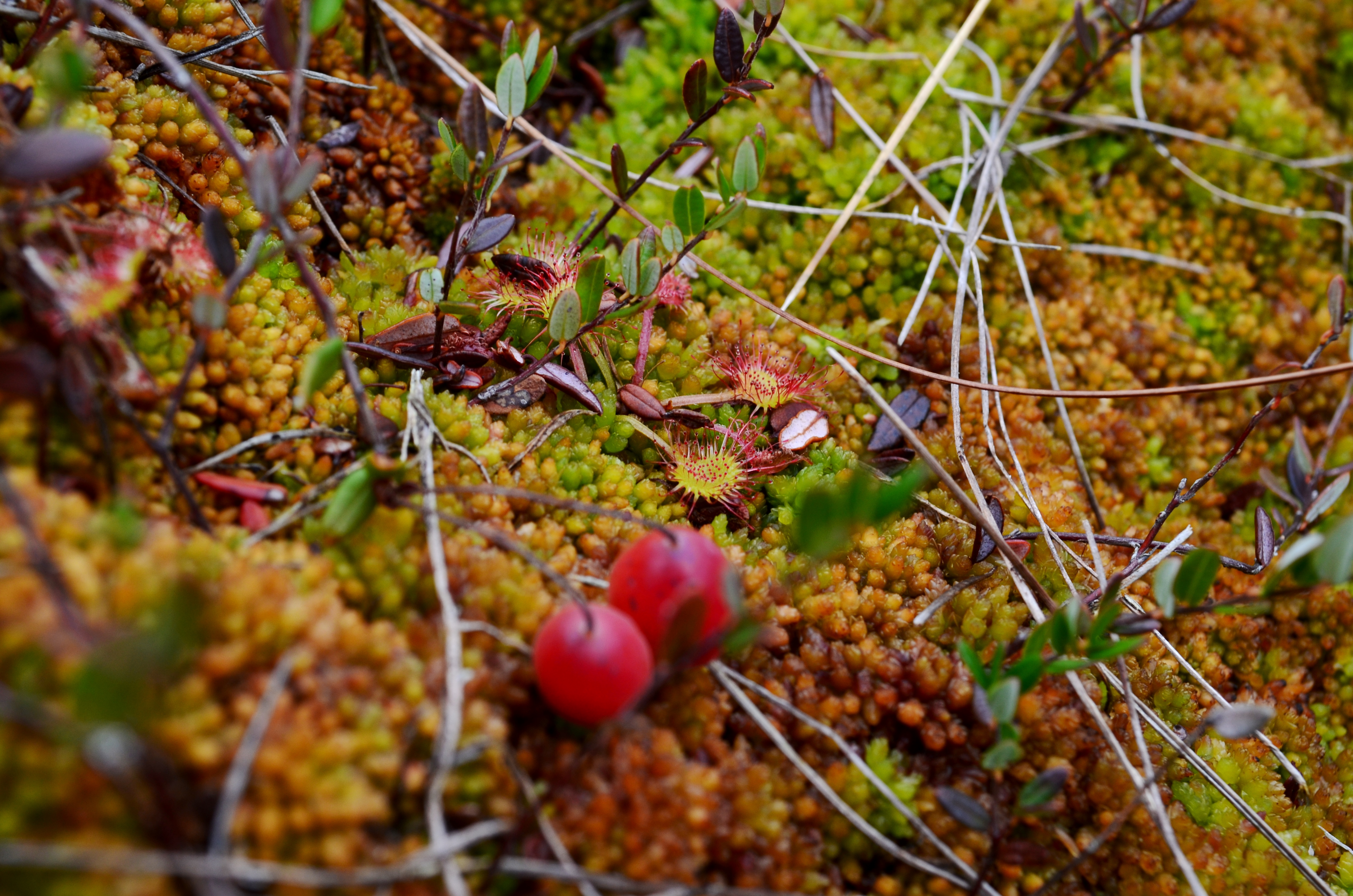
Cranberries and sundews on peat moss

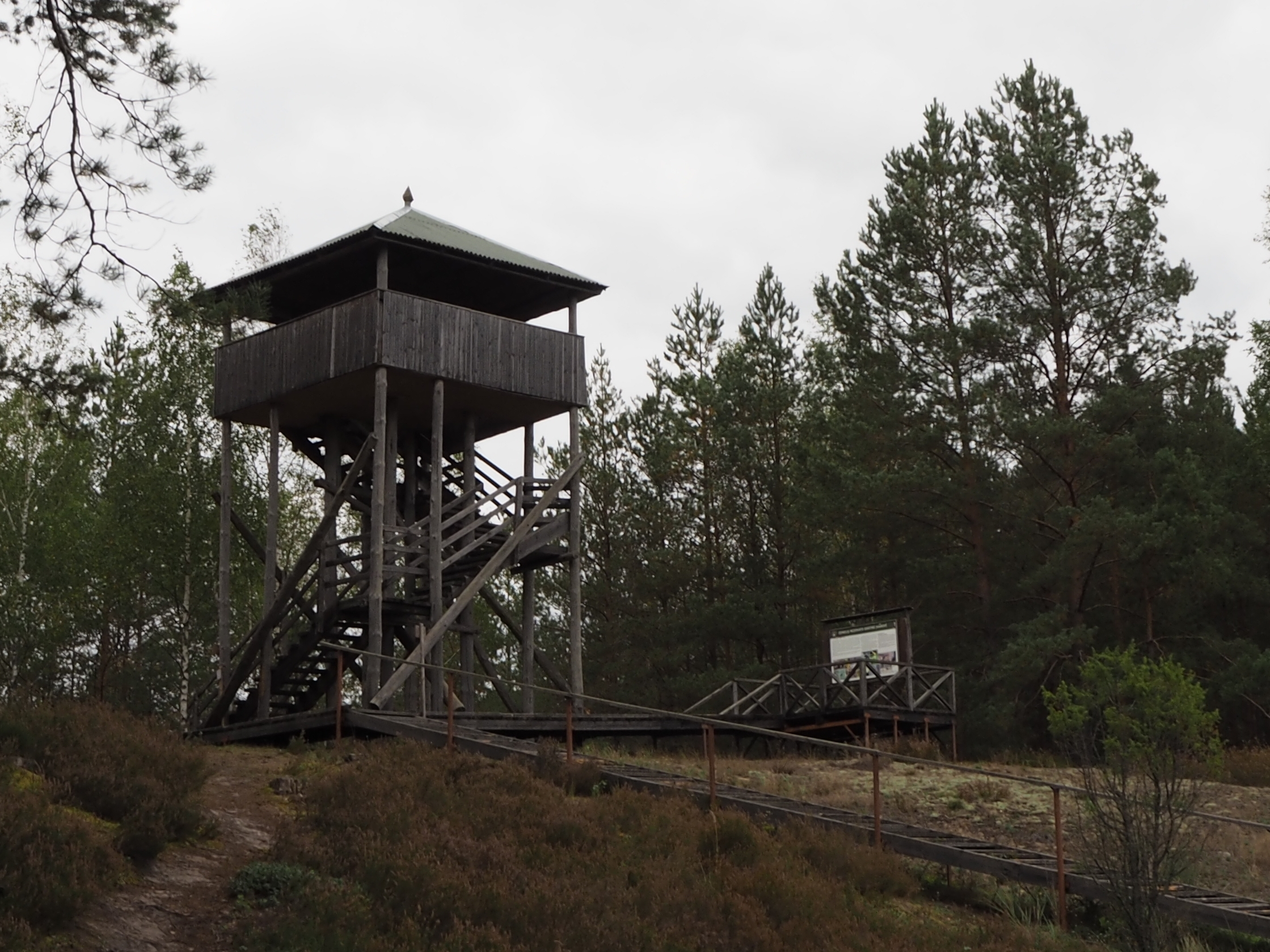
Observation tower

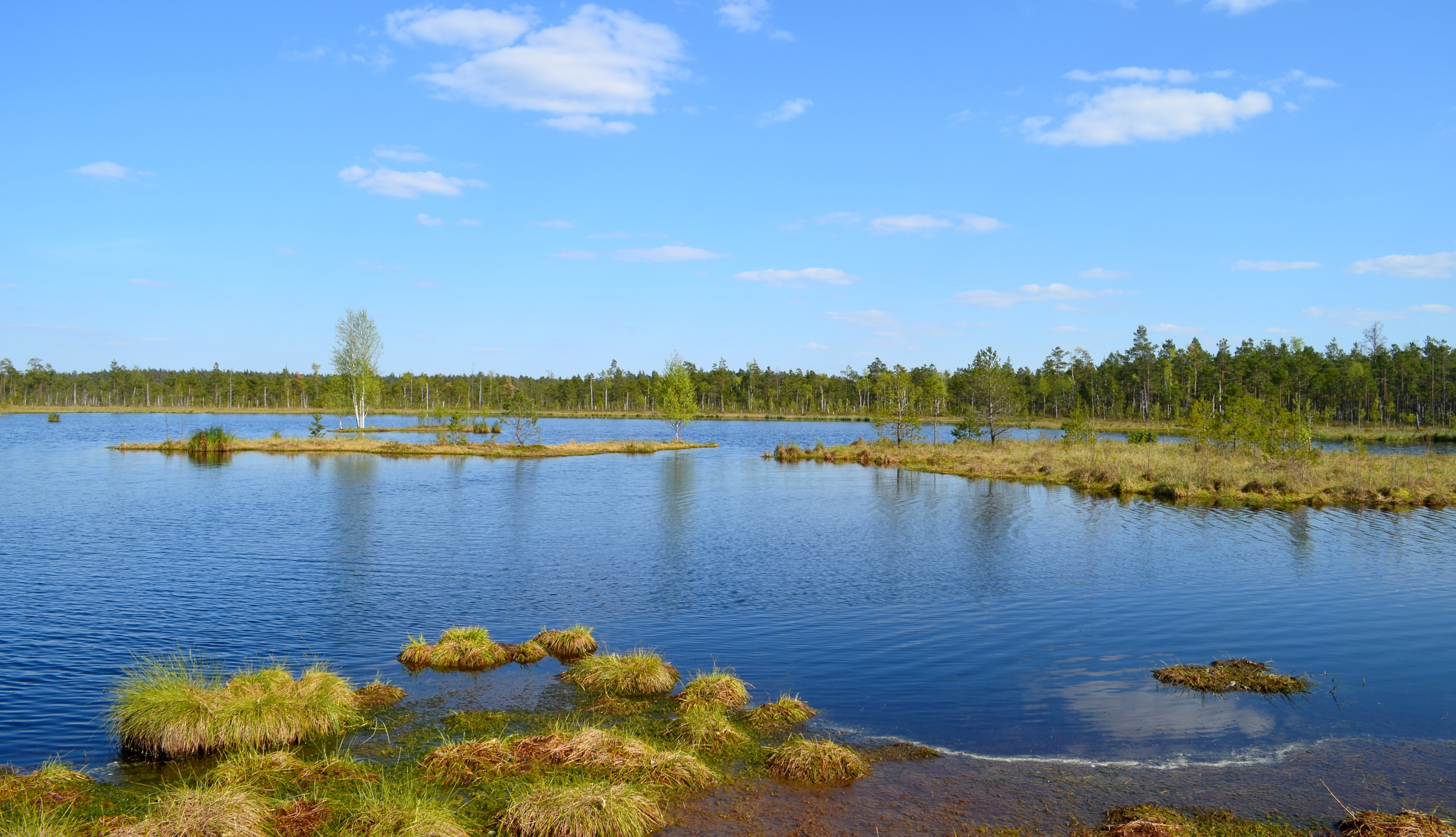
Balnas lake in the territory of Čepkeliai Marsh
