= Lynežeris =

- Village
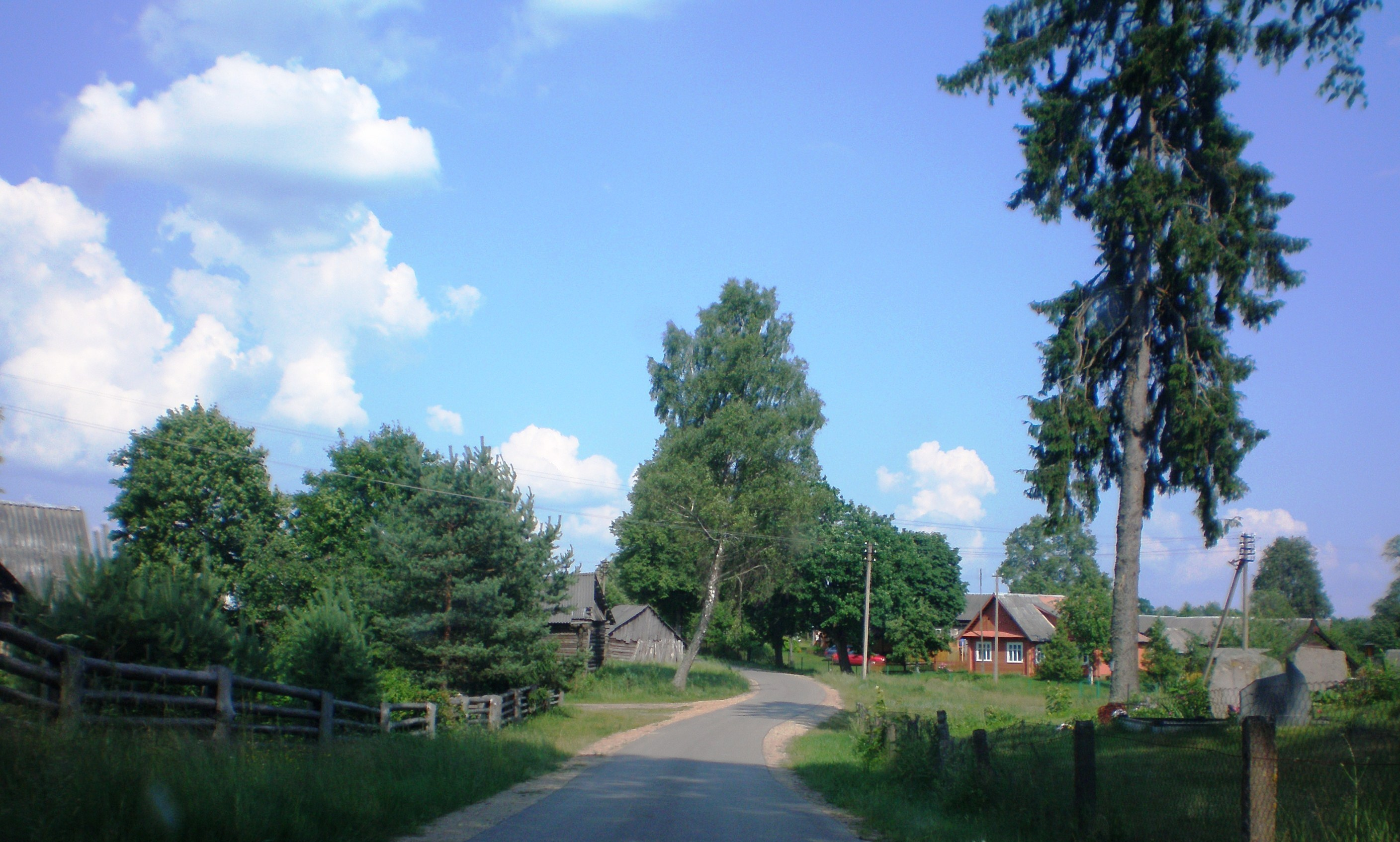

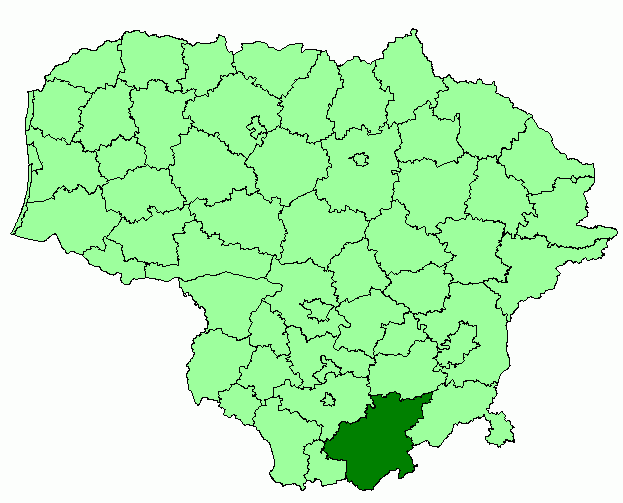
- Location in Varėna district municipality Location of Varėna district in Lithuania
- Coordinates: 54°03′40″N 24°34′19″E
- Country: Lithuania
- County: Alytus County
- Municipality: Varėna
- Eldership: Kaniavos (Kaniava)

Population (2011 Census)
  - Total: 24
- Time zone: UTC+2 (EET)
  - Summer (DST): UTC+3 (EEST)

Lynežeris is a village in Kaniavos eldership, Varėna district municipality, Alytus County, southeastern Lithuania. According to the 2001 census, the village had a population of 34 people. At the 2011 census, the population was 24.

== Etymology ==
The name Lynežeris comes from the nearby lake of the same name. It means 'a lake of tenches' (Lithuanian: lynas 'a tench' + Lithuanian: ežeras 'a lake'). The village is mentioned in earlier sources as Polish: Linica and Russian: Линица (from the word of same origin Belarusian: лінь, лін 'a tench').
