= Marcinkonys =

- Village
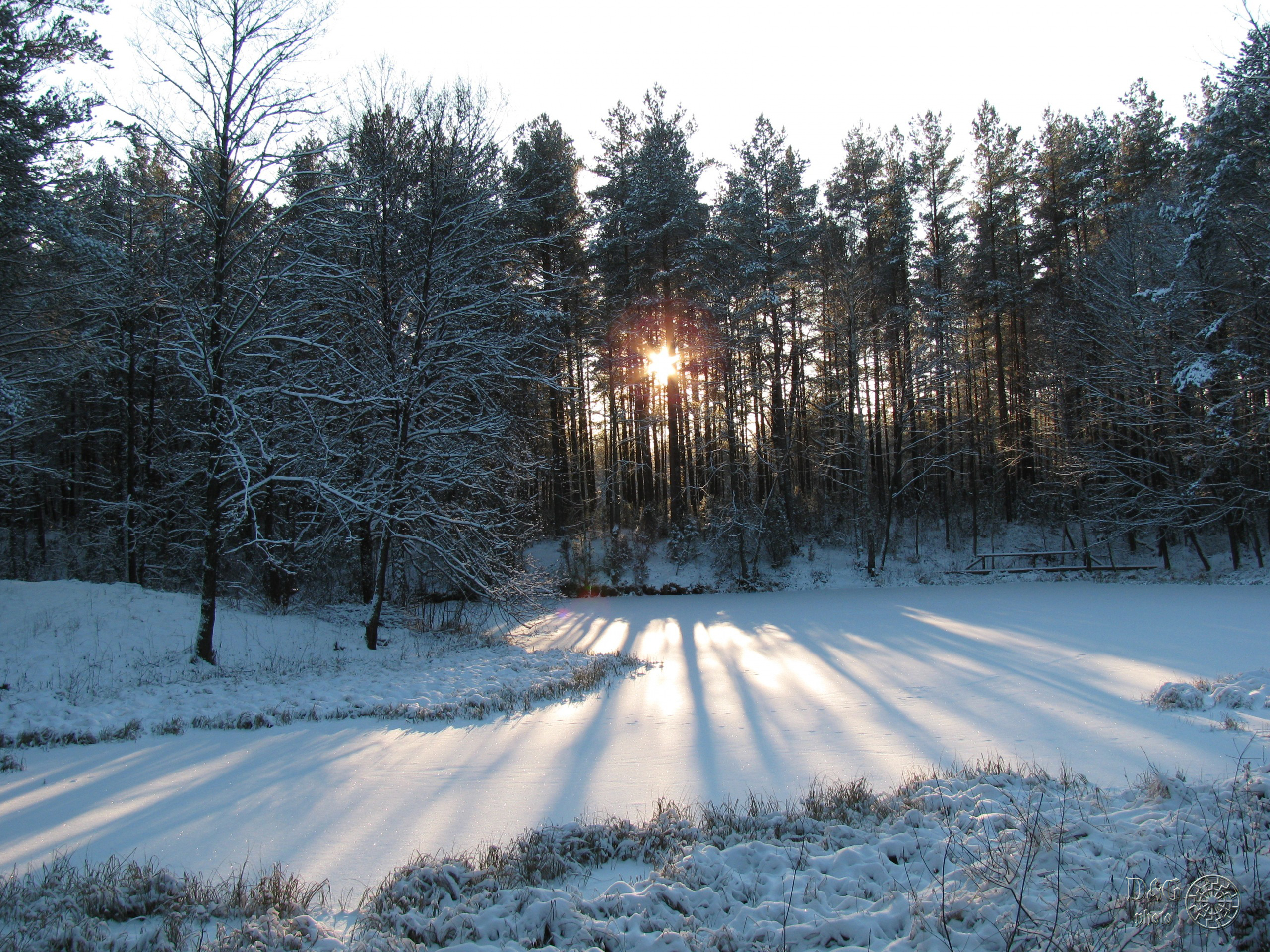
- Marcinkonys area during winter

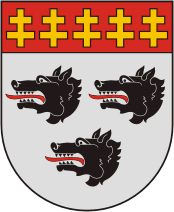
- Coat of arms

- Location within Varėna District Municipality Location within Lithuania
- Coordinates: 54°03′40″N 24°24′0″E
- Country: Lithuania
- Ethnographic region: Dzūkija
- County: Alytus County
- Municipality: Varėna district municipality
- Eldership: Marcinkonys eldership
- Capital of: Marcinkonys eldership

Population (2025)
  - Total: 442
- Time zone: UTC+2 (EET)
  - Summer (DST): UTC+3 (EEST)

Marcinkonys (Polish: Marcinkańce) is a village in Varėna district, Lithuania, located 21 km. south-west of Varėna. It is the administrative center of the Marcinkonys Eldership and it houses the administrations of the Dzūkija National Park and Čepkeliai Nature Reserve. According to the 2020 estimate, it had 591 residents.

Marcinkonys town is located c. 34 kilometres (21 mi) from Druskininkai, 25 kilometres (16 mi) from Varėna.

== History ==
Throughout the history the place was under Russian, Polish, and Soviet rules and therefore it may be referred to by multiple names and spellings, including Marcinkańce (Polish name), Martsinkantse (phonemic transliteration of the Polish name), Martsinkantsy (transliteration of the Russified Polish name), and Martsinkonis (transliteration of Russian Марцинконис).

The settlement was first mentioned in 1637 as a camp of foresters. It began growing after completion of the railway station in its location for the Warsaw – Saint Petersburg Railway in 1864.

During the Holocaust, the town had the Marcinkonys Ghetto for the Lithuanian Jews. Some Jews escaped during the liquidation of the ghetto and managed to survive the war.

== Etymology ==
The name Marcinkonys comes from a personal name Lithuanian: Marcinkónis (also Marcìnka, Marciñkus) which originates from Slavic forms for a name Martin, Marcin (Polish: Marcinko, Marcinek, Belarusian: Маpтынчык).

== Demographics ==
Historical population

Year	Pop.	±%
1959	1,223	—
1979	1,080	−11.7%
1989	835	−22.7%
2001	765	−8.4%

Year	Pop.	±%
2011	640	−16.3%
2021	493	−23.0%
2025	442	−10.3%

Source: 1959, 1979, 1989, 2001, 2011
