= Lithuanians =

Baltic ethnic group

lietuviai

Total population
- c. 4.2 million

Regions with significant populations
- Lithuania 2,378,118 (2021)
- United States: 711,089 (2020) (Note: Including Lithuanians and Lithuanian Americans)
- United Kingdom: 212,000 (2018)
- Brazil: 200,000 (2002)
- Germany: 75,000 (2021)
- Poland: 62,239 (2014)
- Canada: 59,285 (2016)
- Norway: 50,406 (2023)
- Ireland: 42,973 (2022)
- Latvia: 34,846 (2014)
- Australia: 22,012 (2021) (Note: Including Lithuanians and Lithuanian Australians) (Note: Approximately more than 50,000 are of Lithuanian descent)
- Argentina: 20,000 (Note: Approximately 200,000 are of Lithuanian descent)
- Ukraine: 19,954 (2014)
- Belarus: 19,091 (2014)
- Spain: 17,991 (2022)
- Sweden: 17,396 (2022)
- Denmark: 16,429 (2023)
- Russia: 13,230 (2021)
- Netherlands: 10,119 (2022)

Languages
- Lithuanian

Religion
- Predominantly Roman Catholicism (See Religion in Lithuania)

Related ethnic groups
- Other Balts

Lithuanians (Lithuanian: lietuviai) (Note: singular male: lietuvis, singular female: lietuvė Lithuanian pronunciation: [lʲjɛˈtʊʋʲeː]) are a Baltic ethnic group. They are native to Lithuania, where they number around 2,378,118 people. Another two million make up the Lithuanian diaspora, largely found in countries such as the United States, United Kingdom, Brazil and Canada. Their native language is Lithuanian, one of only two surviving members of the Baltic language family along with Latvian. According to the census conducted in 2021, 84.6% of the population of Lithuania identified themselves as Lithuanians. Most Lithuanians belong to the Catholic Church, while the Lietuvininkai who lived in the northern part of East Prussia prior to World War II, were mostly Lutherans.

== Theories on the origin of Lithuanians ==
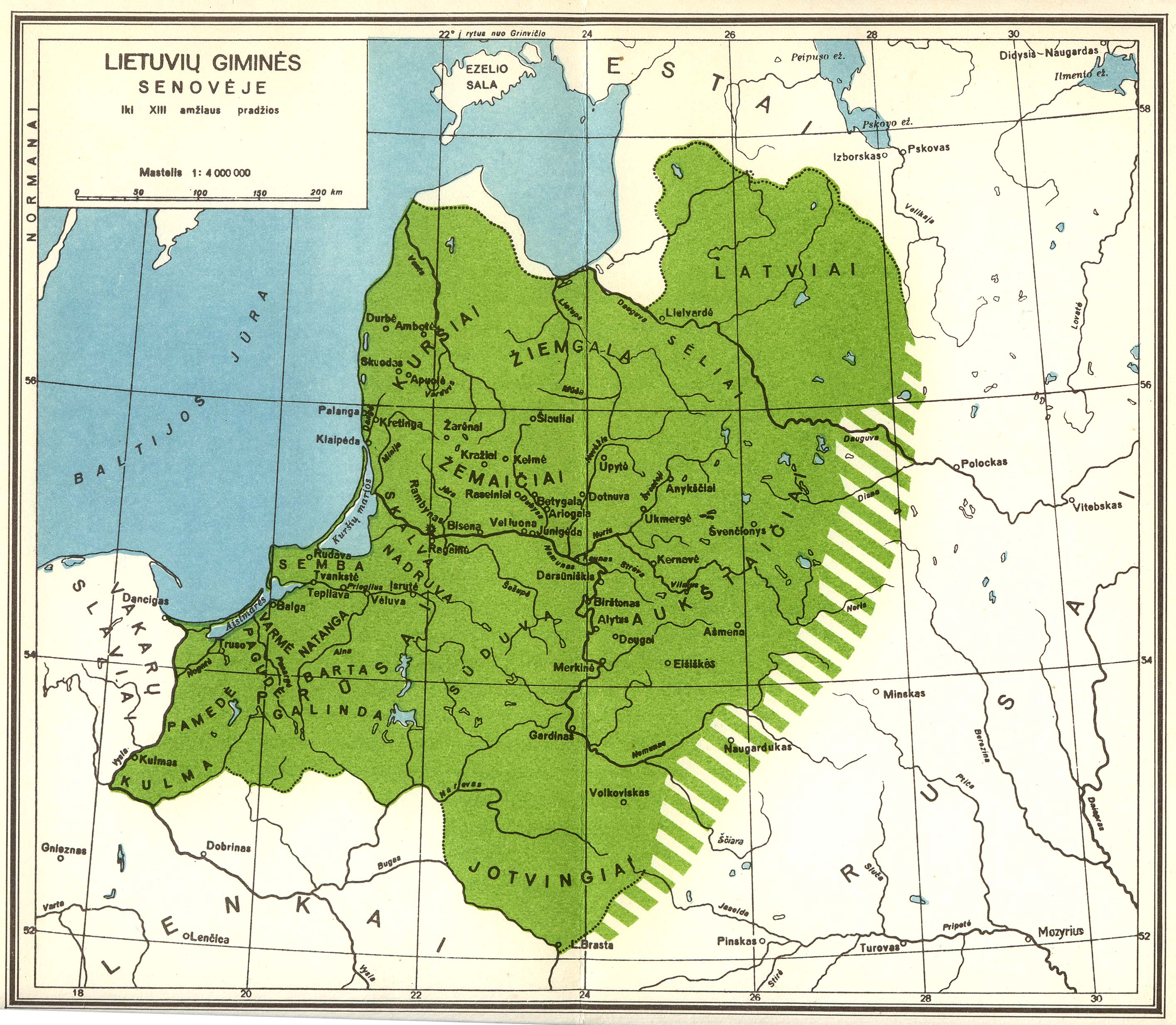
Lithuanian tribes in antiquity until the beginning of the 13th century by Adolfas Šapoka

Theories about the origin of Lithuanians (ethnogenesis) have been recorded since the 15th century, when, like many European nations, Lithuanian nobles sought to emphasize a noble and ancient descent. The most influential was the Roman (Palemon) theory, which claimed Lithuanians originated from Roman patricians led by a nobleman named Palemon who fled Rome, a legend repeated in 16th–17th century chronicles to strengthen noble authority and political legitimacy. From the 16th century, other versions appeared, linking Lithuanians to the Goths, Heruli, Greeks or Hittites, reflecting Western European historiographical traditions that tied nations to ancient peoples known from classical sources, though these accounts were more ideological than historical. Similar legendary origin theories were common across Europe in the Middle Ages, as noble families and ruling dynasties sought to link themselves with the prestige of antiquity. The Palemon legend in particular was especially influential in the Grand Duchy of Lithuania, where it appeared in chronicles and genealogical works to bolster the political autonomy of the Lithuanian nobility. In the 18th century, Enlightenment scholarship began to critically question such legends, and by the late 19th century research into Lithuanian origins was based on linguistics, archaeology, onomastics, and Baltic studies, which clarified the position of Lithuanian among Indo-European languages and the settlement patterns of Baltic tribes. Modern scholarship situates the Lithuanian language within the Baltic branch of the Indo-European family, notable for preserving many archaic features. It holds that Lithuanians formed from eastern Baltic tribes, with the Lithuanian language and culture developing from the first centuries CE through the early Middle Ages, and the Lithuanian ethnos consolidating between the 9th and 13th centuries, culminating in the emergence of a unified Lithuanian identity and statehood.

== Origin and history ==
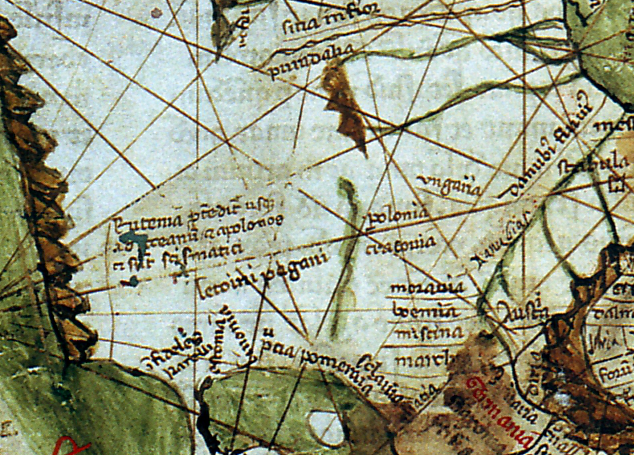
Lithuania in the Mappa mundi of Pietro Vesconte, 1321. The inscription reads: Letvini pagani – pagan Lithuanians.

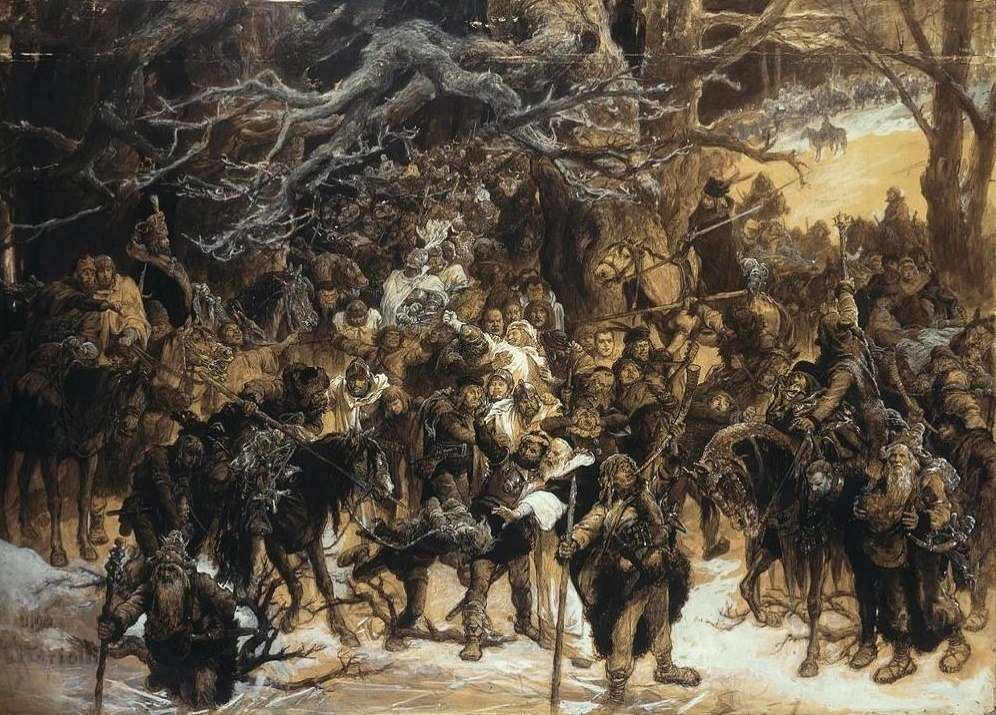
Lithuanians returning from battle against the Teutonic Crusaders. Detail from the painting Whence return Lithuanians? by Michał Elwiro Andriolli

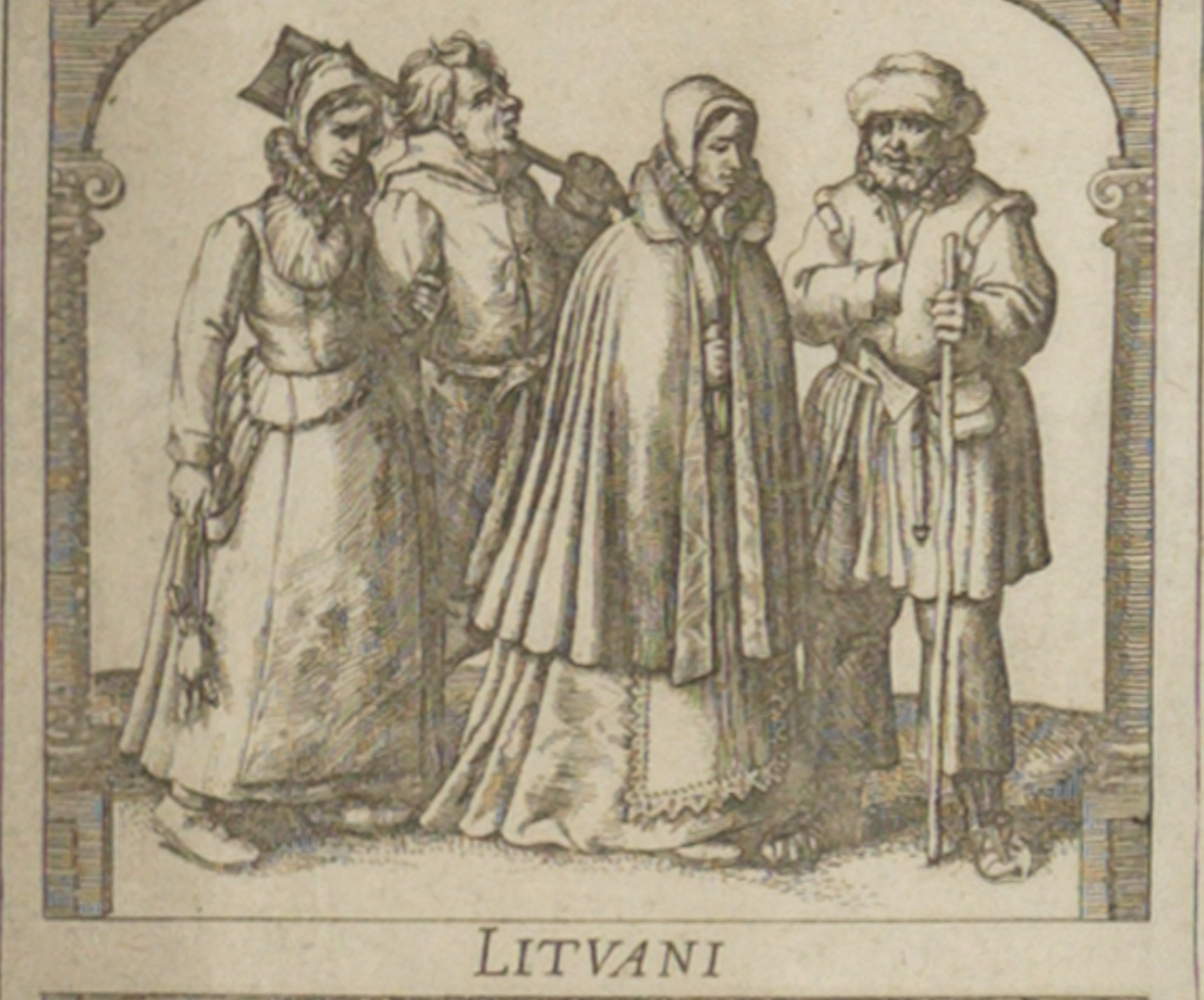
Lithuanians in 1608 depicted by Willem Blaeu

The territory of the Balts, including modern Lithuania, was once inhabited by several Baltic tribal entities (Sudovians, Lithuanians, Curonians, Semigallians, Selonians, Samogitians, Skalvians, Old Prussians (Nadruvians)), as attested by ancient sources and dating from prehistoric times. The Lithuanian nation traces its origins to the Lithuanian tribe and the land called Litua in the 1009 Annals of Quedlinburg; by the 11th–12th centuries it appears in Rus chronicles as Litva, referring to territory east of the Šventoji, the middle Nemunas, the upper Merkys, and the upper Gauja. Over the centuries, and especially under the Grand Duchy of Lithuania, neighbouring tribes consolidated into the Lithuanian nation, mainly as a defence against the marauding Teutonic Order and Eastern Slavs. The Lithuanian state was formed in the High Middle Ages, with different historians dating this variously between the 11th and mid-13th centuries. Mindaugas, Lithuania's only crowned king and its first baptised ruler, is generally considered Lithuania's founder. The Lithuanians are the only branch of Baltic people that managed to create a state entity before the modern era. During the Late Middle Ages, Lithuania was ravaged by the Lithuanian Crusade, which ended only by the Treaty of Melno in 1422. In fact, the crusade persisted after the definite Christianization of Lithuania in 1387, when Europe's last pagan people were baptised. Simultaneously, the Lithuanian state reached its apogee under the rule of Vytautas the Great (r. 1392–1430), when it ruled the lands between the Baltic and Black seas. Thereafter, the Grand Duchy of Lithuania continued existing until 1795, however, since the Union of Lublin in 1569, it maintained its independence in the bi-confederal Polish–Lithuanian Commonwealth. In the 16th century the Lithuanian humanists based the national consciousness of the Grand Duchy of Lithuania on the idea of their national singularity or uniqueness and considered the Grand Duchy of Lithuania as an independent country.

There is a current argument that the Lithuanian language was considered non-prestigious enough by some elements in Lithuanian society, meaning that the number of Lithuanian language-speakers decreased with Polonization in the Polish–Lithuanian Commonwealth, as well as a Germanisation of Prussia. The subsequent imperial Russian occupation from 1795 until 1915, with some interpositions such as the French invasion of Russia in 1812, the Uprisings of 1831 and 1863, accelerated this process of Slavicization. While under Russian occupation, Lithuanians endured Russification, which included the 40-year-long ban on public speaking and writing in Lithuanian (see, e.g., Knygnešiai, the actions against the Catholic Church). In such a context, the Lithuanian National Revival began in the 19th century. Some believed at the time that the Lithuanian nation as such, along with its language, would become extinct within a few generations.

Some of the Polish- and Belarusian-speaking persons from the lands of the former Grand Duchy of Lithuania expressed their affiliation with the modern Lithuanian nation in the early 20th century, including Michał Pius Römer, Stanisław Narutowicz, Oscar Milosz and Tadas Ivanauskas.

In February 1918, while World War I was ongoing, the re-establishment of an independent Lithuanian state was declared, 122 years after it was destroyed. In the aftermath of World War I, Lithuanians militarily defended their country's independence from Poland, Whites and Soviet Russia during the Lithuanian Wars of Independence. However, a third of Lithuania's lands, namely the Vilnius Region, as well as its declared capital, fell under Polish occupation during the Interwar. A standardised Lithuanian language was approved. In the lead-up to the World War II, the Klaipėda Region was occupied by Nazi Germany after the 1939 German ultimatum to Lithuania.

We do not know on whose merits or guilt such a decision was made, or with what we have offended Your Lordship so much that Your Lordship has deservedly been directed against us, creating hardship for us everywhere. First of all, you made and announced a decision about the land of Samogitia, which is our inheritance and our homeland from the legal succession of the ancestors and elders. We still own it, it is and has always been the same Lithuanian land, because there is one language and the same inhabitants. But since the land of Samogitia is located lower than the land of Lithuania, it is called as Samogitia, because in Lithuanian it is called lower land [ Žemaitija ]. And the Samogitians call Lithuania as Aukštaitija, that is, from the Samogitian point of view, a higher land. Also, the people of Samogitia have long called themselves Lithuanians and never – Samogitians, and because of such identity (sic) we do not write about Samogitia in our letter, because everything is one: one country and the same inhabitants."

— Vytautas the Great, excerpt from his 11 March 1420 Latin letter sent to Sigismund, Holy Roman Emperor, in which he described the core of the Grand Duchy of Lithuania, composed from Žemaitija (lowlands) and Aukštaitija (highlands). Term Aukštaitija is known since the 13th century.

The territory inhabited by the ethnic Lithuanians has shrunk over centuries; once Lithuanians made up a majority of the population not only in what is now Lithuania, but also in northwestern Belarus, in large areas of the territory of the modern Kaliningrad Oblast of Russia, and in some parts of modern Latvia and Poland.

In 1940, Lithuania was invaded and occupied by the Soviet Union, and forced to join it as the Lithuanian SSR. The Germans and their allies attacked the USSR in June 1941, and from 1941 to 1944, Lithuania was occupied by Germany. The Germans retreated in 1944, and Lithuania fell under Soviet rule once again. The long-standing communities of Lithuanians in the Kaliningrad Oblast (Lithuania Minor) were almost destroyed as a result.

The Lithuanian nation as such remained primarily in Lithuania, a few villages in northeastern Poland, southern Latvia and also in the diaspora of emigrants. Some indigenous Lithuanians still remain in Belarus and the Kaliningrad Oblast, but their numbers are small compared to what they used to be. Lithuania regained its independence in 1990, and was recognized by most countries in 1991. It became a member of the European Union on 1 May 2004.

== Ethnic composition of Lithuania ==
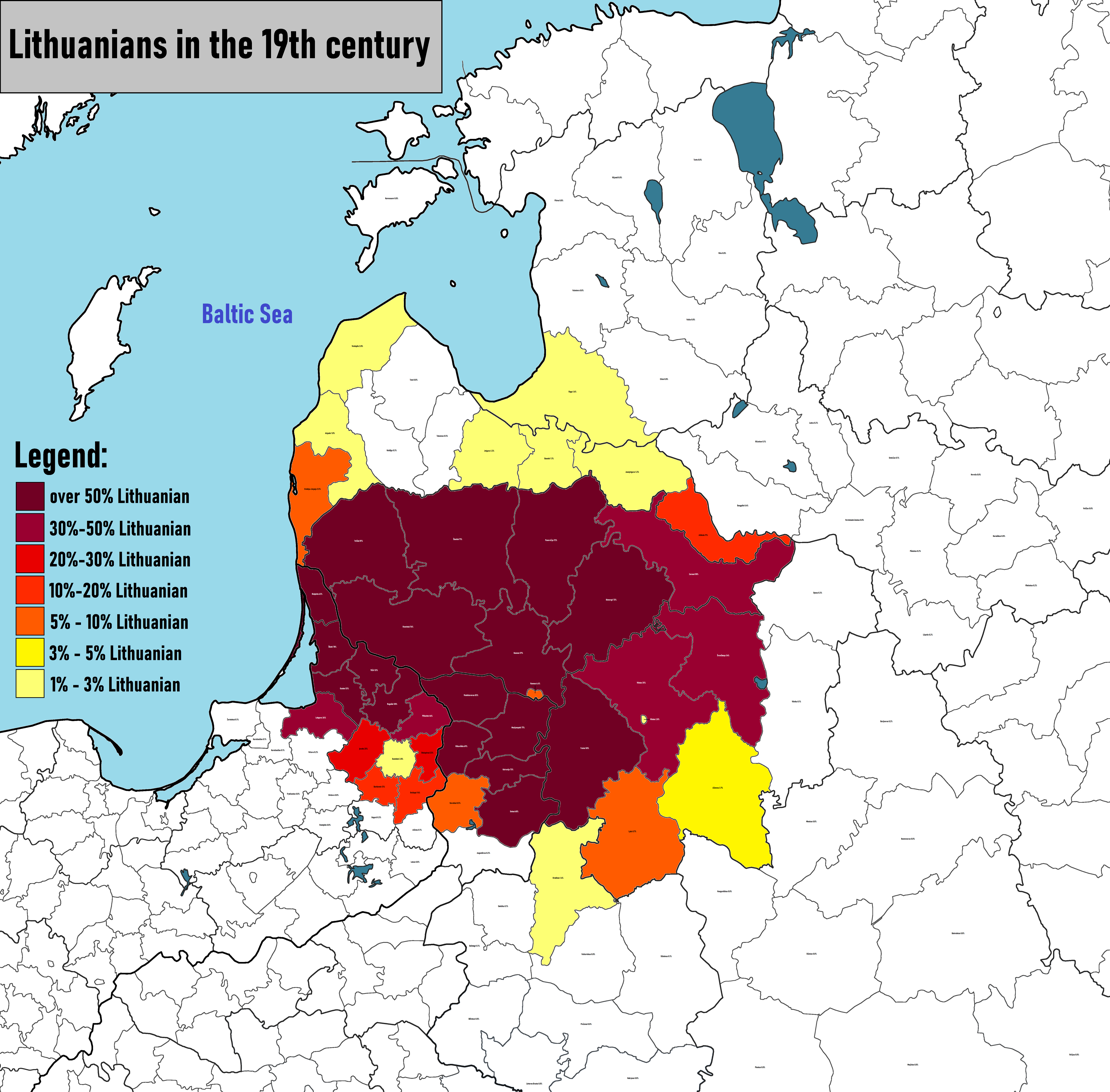
Distribution of ethnic Lithuanian population during the late-19th century (1897 Russian census) over 50% Lithuanian 30% – 50% Lithuanian 20% – 30% Lithuanian 10% – 20% Lithuanian 5% – 10% Lithuanian 3% – 5% Lithuanian 1% – 3% Lithuanian

Among the Baltic states, Lithuania has the most homogeneous population. According to the census conducted in 2001, 83.45% of the population identified themselves as ethnic Lithuanians, 6.74% as Poles, 6.31% as Russians, 1.23% as Belarusians, and 2.27% as members of other ethnic groups such as Ukrainians, Jews, Germans, Tatars, Latvians, Romani, Estonians, Crimean Karaites etc.

Poles are mostly concentrated in the Vilnius County. Especially large Polish communities are located in the Vilnius District Municipality and the Šalčininkai District Municipality.

Despite being the capital, Vilnius was not the largest city by number of Lithuanians until mid-2000s. According to the 2011 census Vilnius had 337,000 Lithuanians while Kaunas had 316,000.

Russians, even though they are almost as numerous as Poles, are much more evenly scattered. The most prominent community lives in the Visaginas Municipality (52%). Most of them are workers who moved from Russia to work at the Ignalina Nuclear Power Plant. A number of ethnic Russians left Lithuania after the declaration of independence in 1990.

In the past, the ethnic composition of Lithuania has varied dramatically. The most prominent change was the extermination of the Jewish population during the Holocaust. Before World War II, about 7.5% of the population was Jewish; they were concentrated in cities and towns and had a significant influence on crafts and business. They were called Litvaks and had a strong culture. The population of Vilnius, which was sometimes nicknamed the northern Jerusalem, was about 30% Jewish. Almost all its Jews were killed during the Holocaust in Nazi-occupied Lithuania, some 75,000 alone between the years 1941 – 1942, while others later immigrated to the United States and Israel. Now there are about 3,200 Jews living in Lithuania.

== Cultural subgroups ==
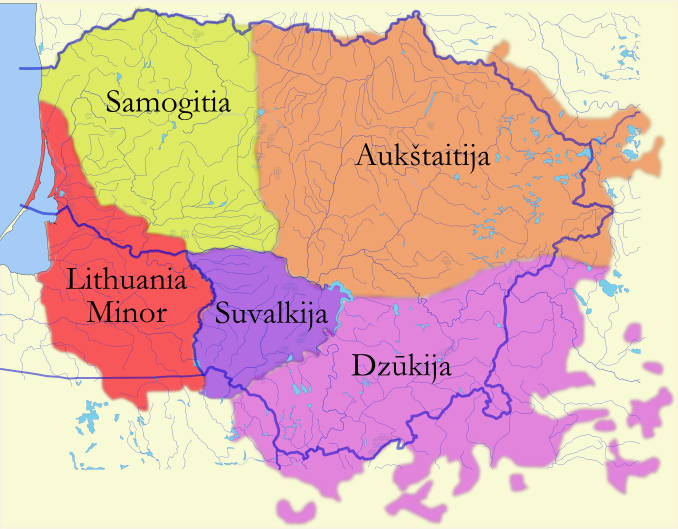
Historical ethnographic regions

Apart from the various religious and ethnic groups currently residing in Lithuania, Lithuanians themselves retain and differentiate between their regional identities; there are 5 historic regional groups: Žemaičiai, Suvalkiečiai, Aukštaičiai, Dzūkai and Lietuvininkai, the last of which is virtually extinct. City dwellers are usually considered just Lithuanians, especially ones from large cities such as Vilnius or Kaunas. The five groups are delineated according to certain region-specific traditions, dialects, and historical divisions. There are some stereotypes used in jokes about these subgroups, for example, Sudovians are supposedly frugal while Samogitians are stubborn.

=== Aukštaičiai ===
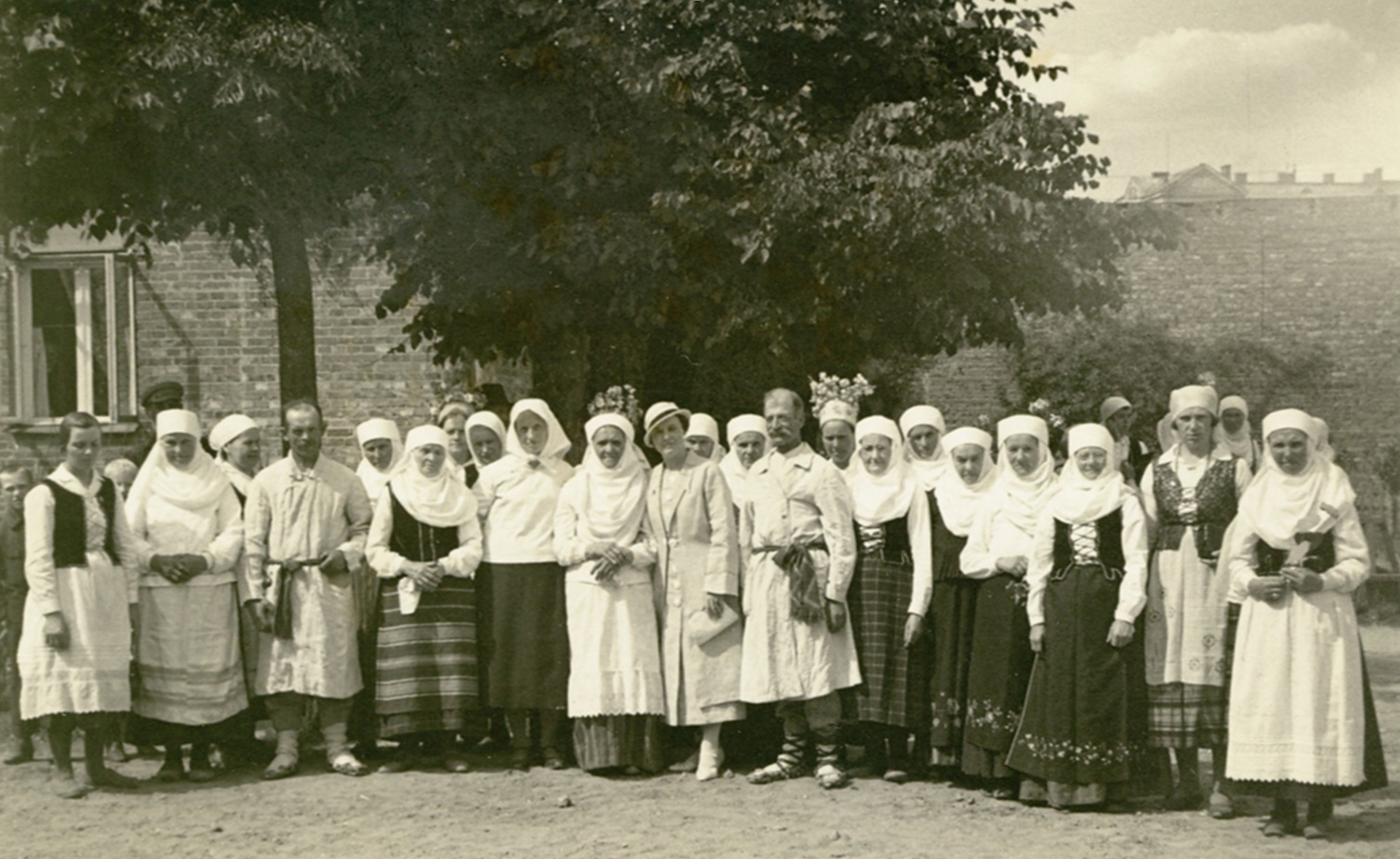
Kupiškian Aukštaitians in traditional clothing, 1930

The Aukštaičiai are the largest and one of the oldest Lithuanian ethnographic groups, traditionally inhabiting the eastern and central parts of Lithuania. Their homeland, known as Aukštaitija ("Highlands"), stretches east of the Dubysa River and north of the Neman and Neris rivers, encompassing towns such as Panevėžys, Utena, and Anykščiai. Historical sources from the 13th century already mention the name Aukštaitija, referring to upland regions that later became part of the Grand Duchy of Lithuania. The Aukštaičiai were crucial in the early consolidation of Lithuanian lands, as their territories included the medieval political and cultural centers of the state. Their dialect, forming the basis of the modern standard Lithuanian language, preserves several ancient features in phonetics and morphology. Culturally, Aukštaičiai have been known for wooden architecture, folk songs with rich melodies, and agrarian customs centered around seasonal festivals such as Jorė and Rasos. Despite modernization, local identity and traditions remain strong, reflected in regional folklore and ethnographic museums across Aukštaitija.

=== Dzūkai ===
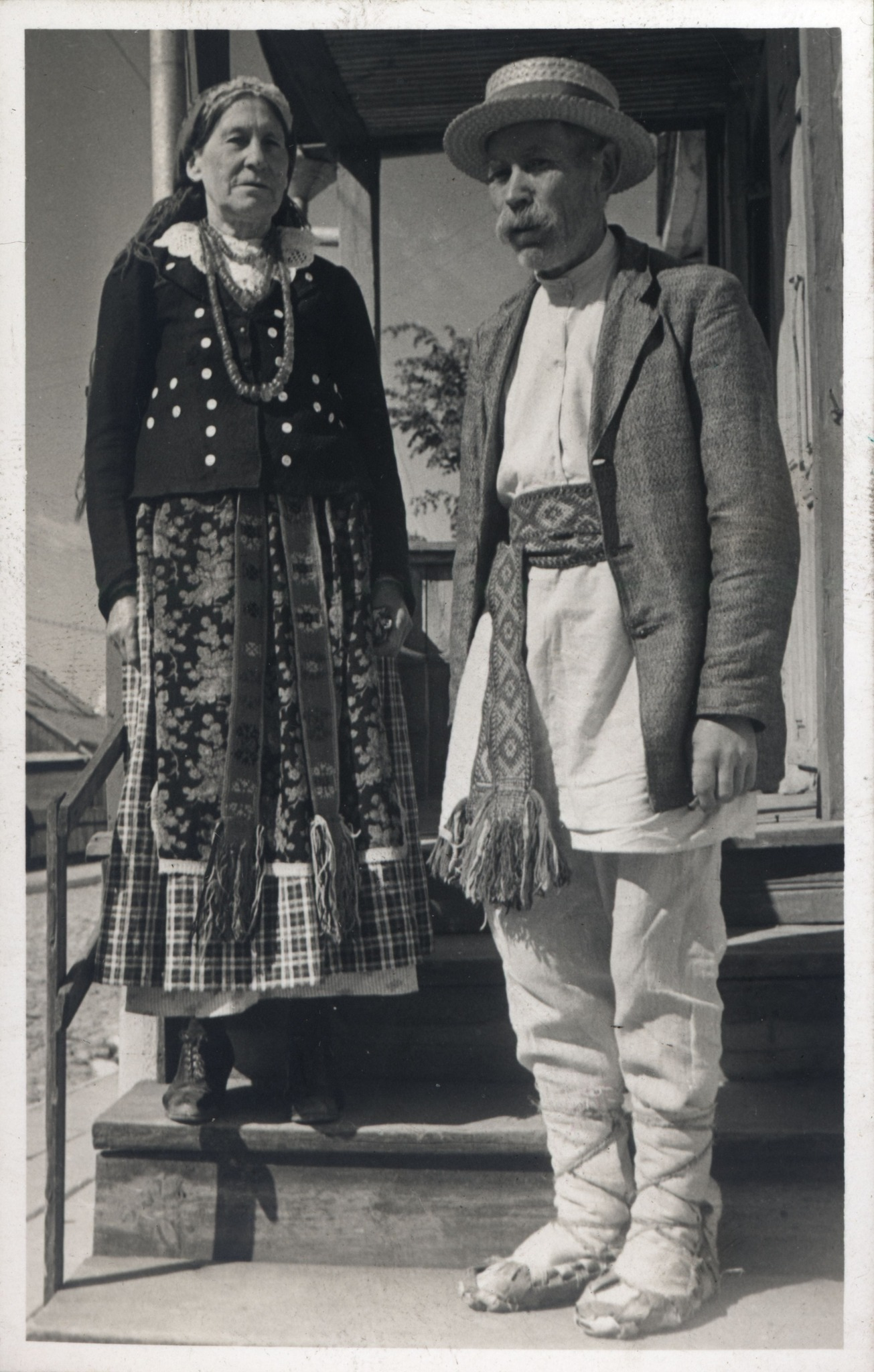
Dzūkians of Merkinė in traditional clothing, 1935

The Dzūkai inhabit Dzūkija, a region in southeastern Lithuania bordered by the Neman and Neris rivers and extending to the Belarusian frontier. The landscape of Dzūkija is marked by sandy soils, pine forests, and numerous rivers and lakes, which shaped a distinctive way of life based on small-scale agriculture, beekeeping, hunting, and forest gathering. Due to these environmental conditions, foraging for mushrooms and berries became an important supplement to rural livelihoods, earning Dzūkija the nickname "the land of mushrooms and songs." The Dzūkai speak a unique sub-dialect of Southern Aukštaitian, characterized by the use of dz sounds hence their ethnonym. Historically, the region was sparsely populated and somewhat isolated, helping to preserve many elements of traditional folklore, costume, and song. The Dzūkai wore folk clothing exceptionally long among Lithuanian ethnic groups as colorful skirts and aprons were wore until the 1940s. Folk poetry, dance, and polyphonic singing remain vital parts of local cultural expression, while the ethnographic village of Marcinkonys and the Dzūkija National Park serve as centers for cultural preservation.

=== Žemaičiai ===
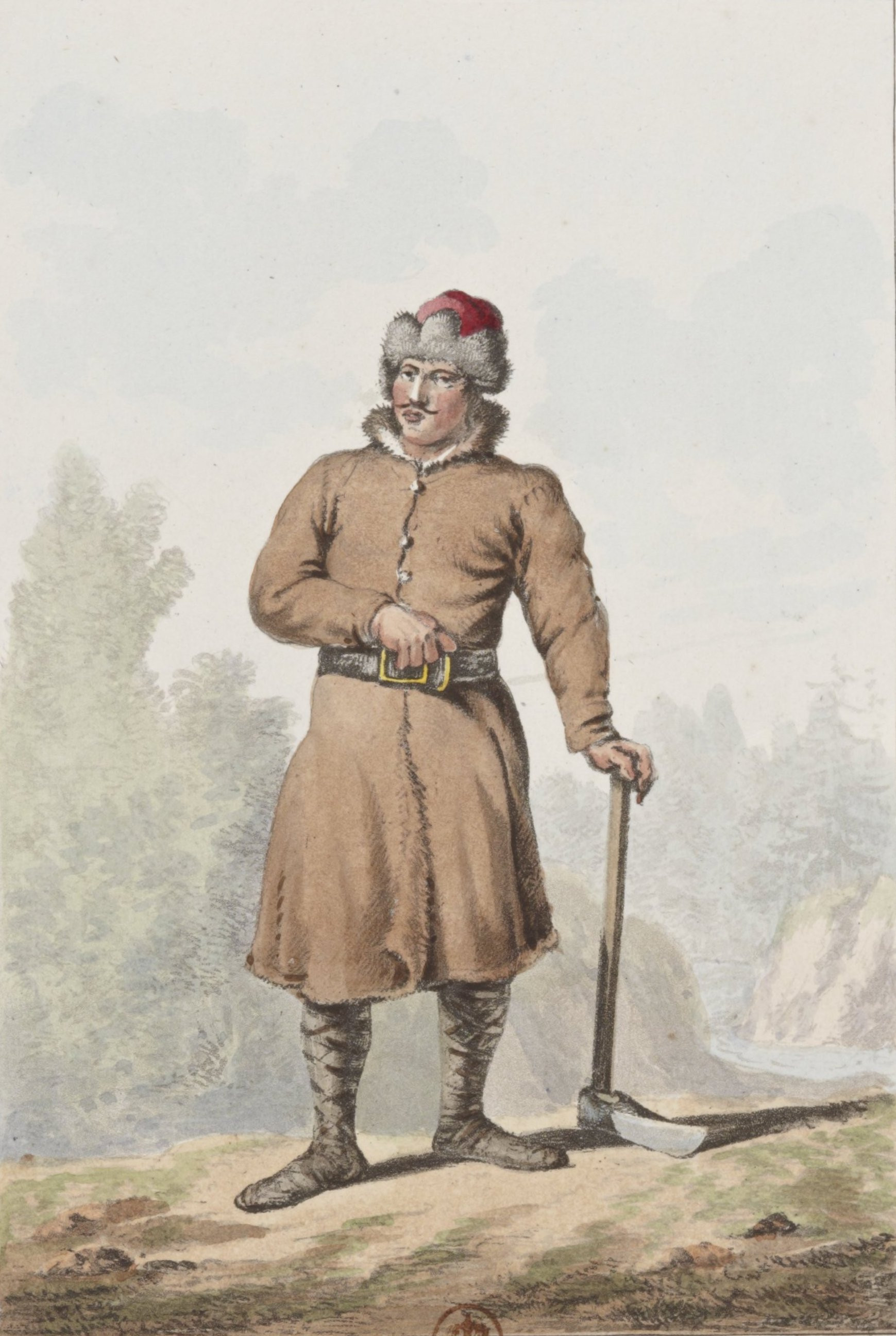
Samogitian man in traditional clothes, 1817

The Žemaičiai, also known as Samogitians, form a distinct ethnographic group living in Žemaitija ("Lowlands") in western Lithuania, roughly between the Dubysa River and the Baltic coast. Unlike their eastern counterparts, the Žemaičiai maintained a strong local identity that persisted through centuries of political and religious change. Historically, Žemaitija was the last region of Europe to accept Christianity, officially baptized only in 1413, and it played a key role in resisting both the Teutonic Order and external attempts at domination. The Samogitian dialect is highly distinctive, differing significantly from standard Lithuanian in pronunciation, grammar, and vocabulary, to the extent that it is sometimes considered a separate language. Culturally, Žemaičiai are known for their resilience, local patriotism, and preservation of traditional crafts, music, and folk art. The region's hilly terrain, wooden churches, and historic towns like Telšiai and Plungė are symbols of this enduring cultural identity, and the Samogitian Museum Alka stands as a center for regional history and ethnography.

=== Suvalkiečiai ===
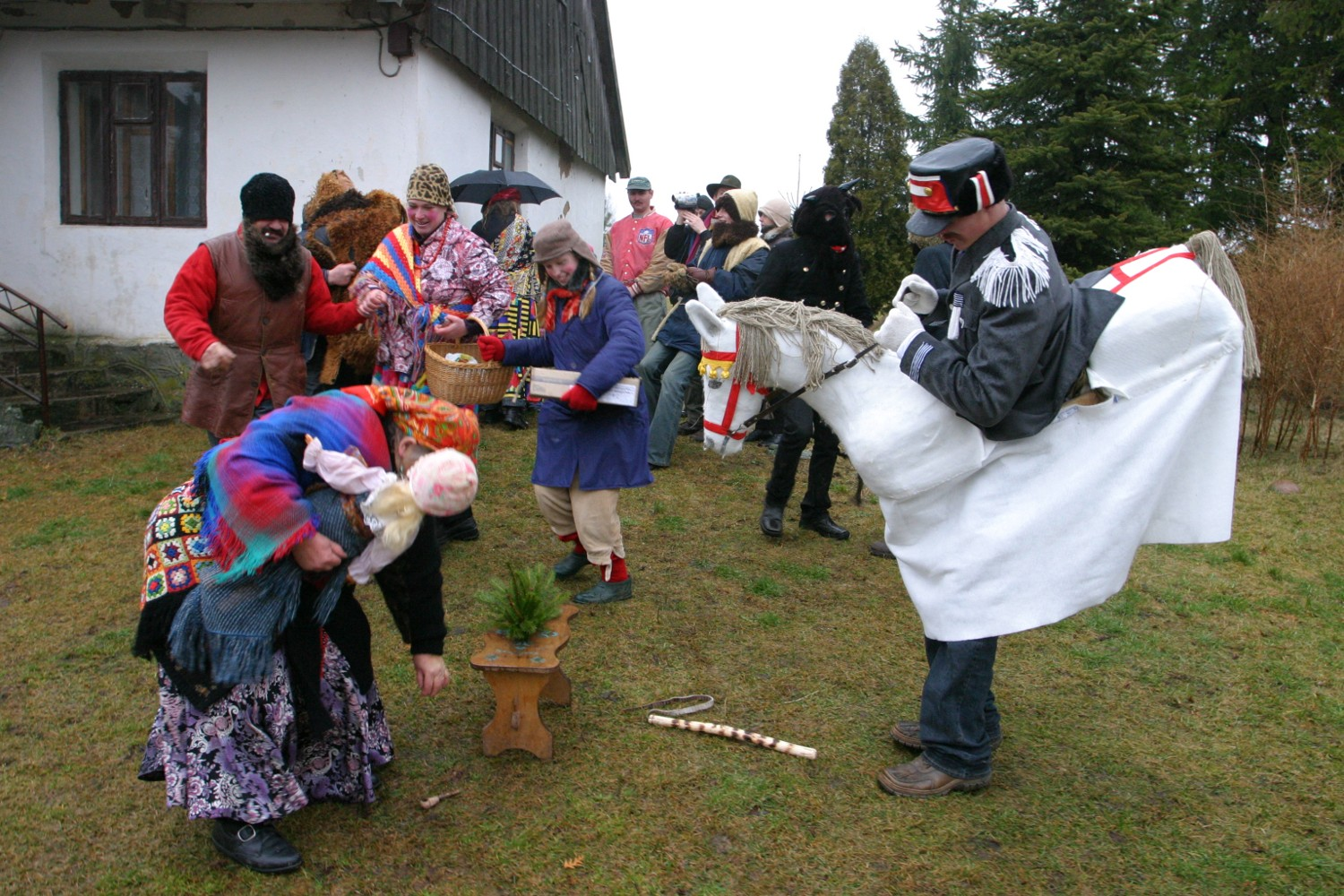
Suvalkians celebrating the Dance of Šyvis in Gražiškiai, 2004

The Suvalkiečiai (also called Sūduviai or Užnemunians) are the ethnographic group native to southwestern Lithuania, in the area historically known as Užnemunė, located west of the Neman River and including the present-day districts of Marijampolė, Vilkaviškis, Kalvarija, and Šakiai. The region's name derives from the nearby Suwałki region (now in Poland), reflecting its historical ties to the Duchy of Warsaw and later the Russian-ruled Congress Poland. The Suvalkiečiai are often described as among the most orderly and prosperous Lithuanian groups, a reputation linked to early land reforms and a tradition of private land ownership that encouraged efficient agriculture and well-maintained homesteads. Distinct subgroups, such as the Kapsai and Zanavykai, have their own local variations in dialect, attire, and folklore. Their speech is closer to standard Lithuanian, as the modern language was largely codified on the basis of Suvalkian and Aukštaitian varieties. Regional costumes are characterized by bright colors and decorative patterns, and the area remains a center of Lithuanian rural traditions and patriotism.

=== Lietuvininkai (Prūsijos lietuviai) ===
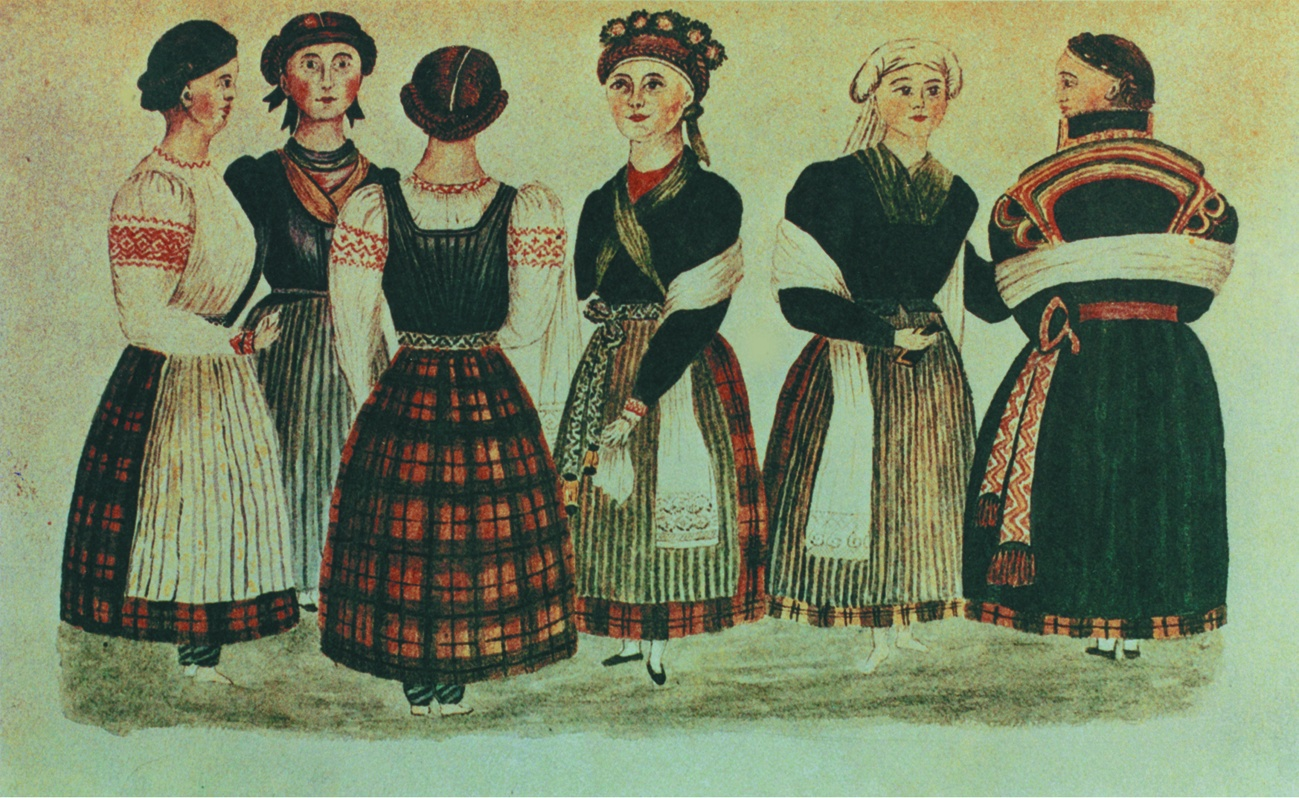
Prussian Lithuanian women in traditional dresses, mid-19th century

The Lietuvininkai, also known as Prussian Lithuanians, were a Lithuanian-speaking cultural group historically living in Lithuania Minor (Mažoji Lietuva), the northern part of East Prussia along the Nemunas Delta and the Baltic coast. Their ancestors settled there during medieval times, and over centuries they developed a unique cultural synthesis within the German-dominated Prussian state. The Lietuvininkai were early adopters of the Reformation, which strengthened literacy and fostered the publication of Lithuanian-language books — the first being Martynas Mažvydas' Catechism (1547), the earliest printed work in Lithuanian. The Great Northern War plague outbreak in 1700–1721 killed 53% of residents in Lithuania Minor, while more than 90% of the deceased were Prussian Lithuanians. This community maintained a strong Lutheran faith and a literary tradition that deeply influenced the development of Lithuanian written culture. However, throughout the 19th and early 20th centuries, the Lietuvininkai faced gradual Germanization and displacement, especially after World War II, when most of the population was expelled or fled from East Prussia. Today, their cultural heritage is commemorated in museums and research centers in Klaipėda and Šilutė, preserving the memory of this once-vibrant Lithuanian group.

== Genetics ==
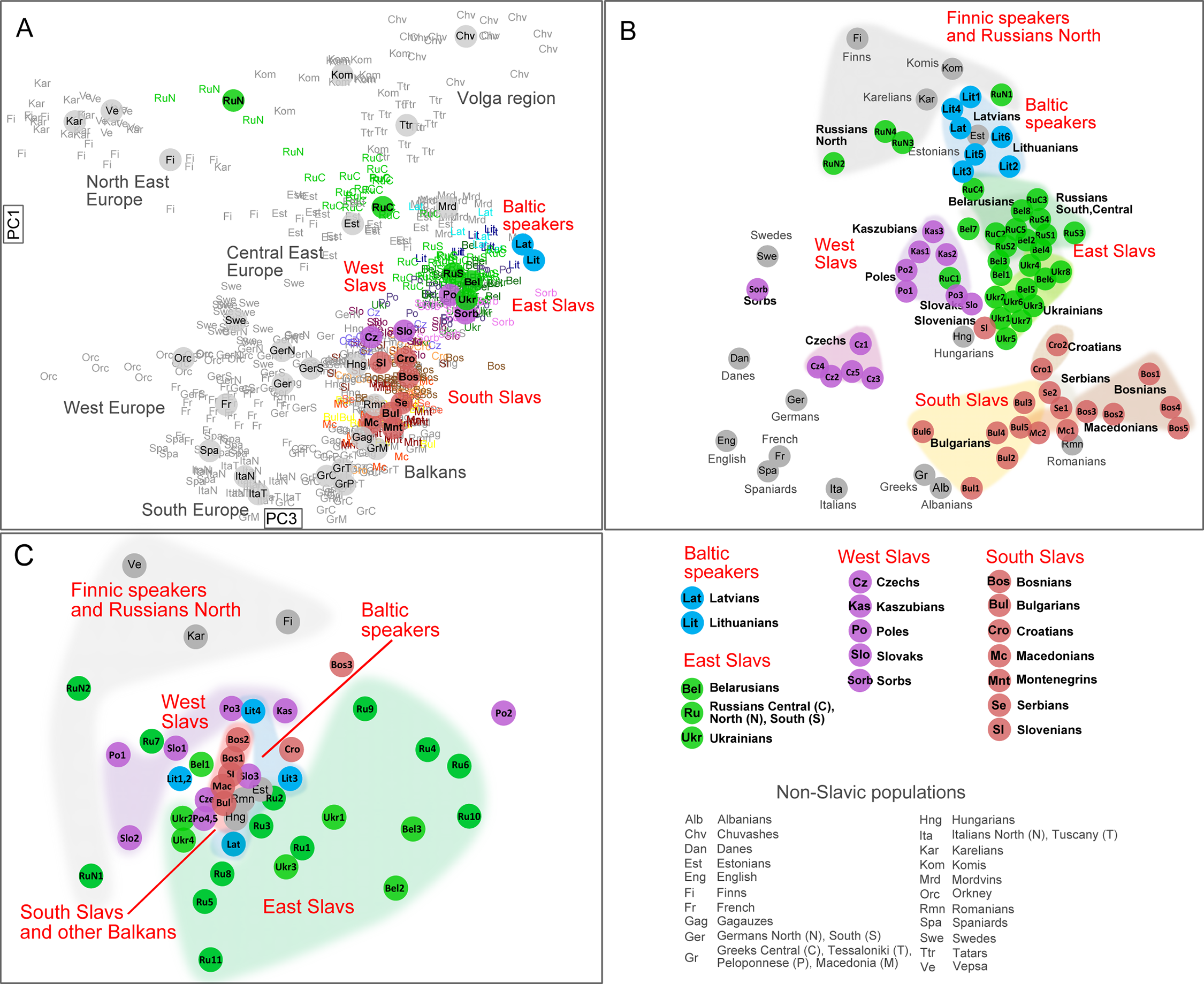
Genetic distance of Balto-Slavs by A (atDNA), B (Y-DNA) and C (mtDNA plot).

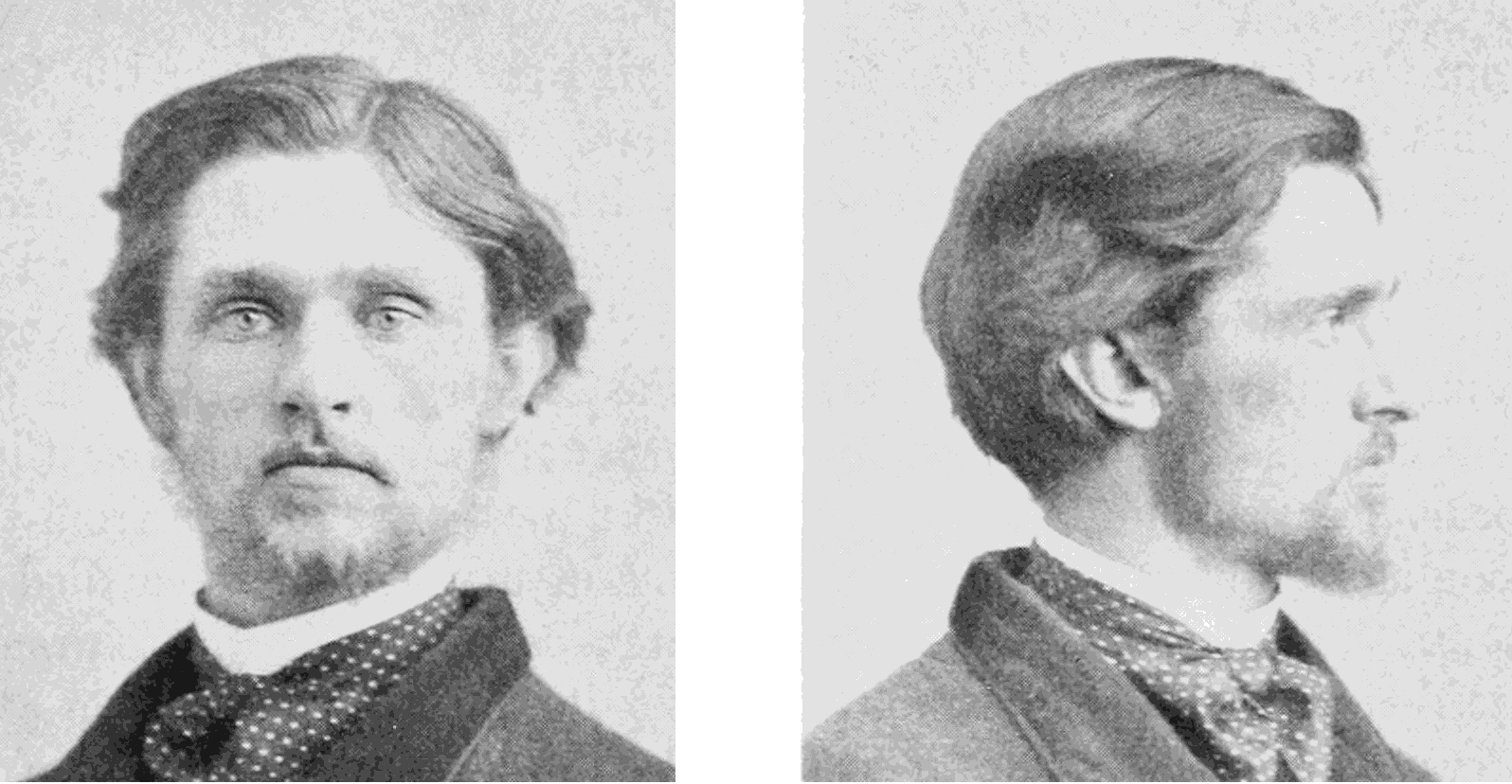
An ethnic Lithuanian man featured on a Popular Science magazine in 1898.

Since the late Neolithic period the native inhabitants of the Lithuanian territory have not been replaced by migrations from outside, so there is a high probability that the inhabitants of present-day Lithuania have preserved the genetic composition of their forebears relatively undisturbed by the major demographic movements, although without being actually isolated from them. The Lithuanian population appears to be relatively homogeneous, without apparent genetic differences among ethnic subgroups.

A 2004 analysis of mtDNA in a Lithuanian population revealed that Lithuanians are close to both Indo-European and Uralic-speaking populations of Northern Europe. Y-chromosome SNP haplogroup analysis showed Lithuanians to be closest to Latvians, Estonians, Belarusians and southern Finns. This is the result of Iron Age Europe. Autosomal SNP analysis situates Lithuanians most proximal to Latvians, followed by the westernmost East Slavs; furthermore, Germans and West Slavs (especially Poles) are situated more proximal to Lithuanians than Finns and northern Russians.

A 2025 analysis of mtDNA found a significant amount of continuity in haplogroups from ancient to modern times in populations in Lithuania, while noting that their haplogroups "gained more diversity" over time. They found that modern ethnic Lithuanians mostly harbor European haplogroups but also have small frequencies of Asian haplogroups.

In 2022, researchers at Vilnius University have fully sequenced Lithuanian genomes using advanced supercomputing, revealing a remarkably preserved European gene pool shaped by millennia of isolation—both culturally and geographically—from forests and swamps after the last ice age. Their analysis shows Lithuanians retain significant genetic links to ancient European hunter-gatherers and even Neanderthals, including adaptations in traits like skin pigmentation, immunity, and metabolism. One highlighted Neanderthal-derived gene, BNC2, contributes to lighter skin and Caucasian features, including blue eyes, while another gene, HLA‑DRB1, enhances immune response to local pathogens. Two genes—PNLIP and PNLIPRP3—related to fat digestion appear to have been under consistent natural selection for over 250,000 years, suggesting an inherited adaptation to a diet rich in meat and oily fish. This may explain why Lithuanians thrive on traditional high-fat dishes like cepelinai.

Lithuanian Ashkenazi Jews display a number of unique genetic characteristics; the utility of these variations has been the subject of debate. One variation, which is implicated in familial hypercholesterolemia, has been dated to the 14th century, corresponding to the establishment of Ashkenazi settlements in response to the invitation extended by Vytautas the Great in 1388.

At the end of the 19th century, the average height of males was 163.5 cm (5 ft 4 in) and the average height of females was 153.3 cm (5 ft 0 in). By the end of the 20th century, heights averaged 181.3 cm (5 ft 11 in) for males and 167.5 cm (5 ft 6 in) for females.

== Diaspora ==
Countries with largest Lithuanian populations. Lithuania + 100,000 + 10,000 + 1,000

=== Prior to the late-20th century ===
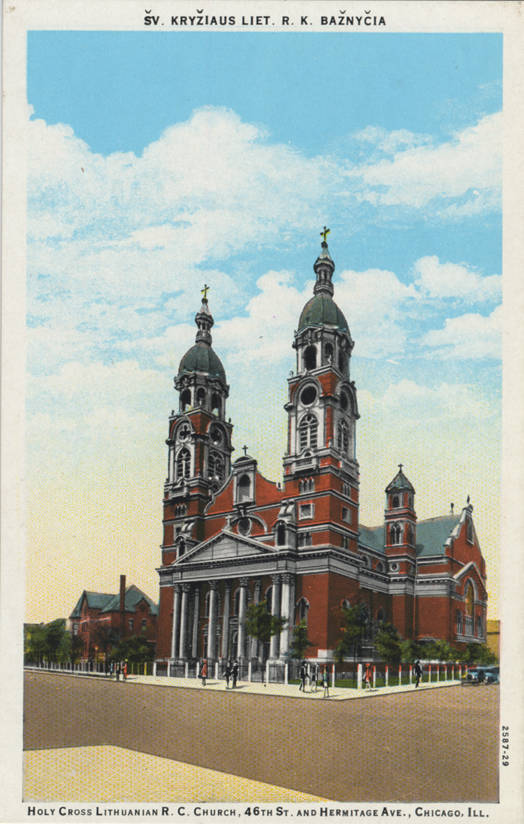
Holy Cross Lithuanian Church in Chicago, built 1904-1915

The Lithuanian diaspora prior to the late 20th century developed over several centuries through a complex interplay of political, economic, and cultural forces that repeatedly pushed Lithuanians beyond their homeland's borders. The earliest traces of Lithuanians abroad appear as early as the 13th and 14th centuries, when members of the ruling elite and nobility of the Grand Duchy of Lithuania established dynastic ties across Europe. Marriages between Lithuanian dukes and foreign princes, diplomatic missions, and ecclesiastical appointments drew Lithuanians into the courts and universities of Central and Western Europe, where they formed small but symbolically significant communities. Some Lithuanian clerics and scholars, for instance, studied and settled in centers such as Königsberg and Kraków, introducing early elements of Lithuanian culture to foreign intellectual circles. The mid-17th century brought a more traumatic form of dispersion, as the wars between the Polish–Lithuanian Commonwealth and Tsardom of Russia devastated the Lithuanian lands. Tens of thousands of Lithuanians were captured, deported, or forced to flee eastward; according to contemporary accounts, by 1655 Lithuanians made up a notable share of Moscow's population. The 19th century marked the beginning of mass Lithuanian migration and the shaping of what would become the modern diaspora. Following the partitions of the Polish–Lithuanian Commonwealth and the imposition of Russian imperial rule, Lithuanians faced restrictions on language, education, and political life, alongside the economic hardships of agrarian change and limited land ownership. Many sought livelihoods elsewhere in the empire, moving to industrial centers such as Saint Petersburg, Moscow, Kiev, and Odessa, where they worked as craftsmen, laborers, and traders. Political upheavals further contributed to this outward movement: participants in the uprisings of 1830–31 and 1863–64 against Russian rule were executed, imprisoned, or exiled deep into Siberia, where they formed isolated Lithuanian enclaves that nevertheless maintained cultural traditions and even clandestine education. Toward the end of the century, as industrialization spread and transatlantic travel became more accessible, Lithuanians began emigrating in large numbers to the United States. Driven by poverty, lack of land, and hopes for better wages, they settled primarily in the industrial Midwest and Northeast, in cities such as Chicago, Pittsburgh, Scranton, and Cleveland. By the early 20th century, nearly 300,000 Lithuanian immigrants were living in the United States, where they founded parishes, schools, newspapers, and fraternal societies to preserve their language and culture. The upheavals of the early 20th century reshaped the diaspora once more. During the First World War, hundreds of thousands of Lithuanians fled advancing armies or were evacuated by Russian authorities to the empire's interior, forming significant refugee communities in places such as Voronezh and Saratov. Although many returned home after Lithuania declared independence in 1918, others remained abroad, adding to a growing global Lithuanian presence. The interwar Republic of Lithuania actively sought to strengthen ties with its emigrants, recognizing their importance in sustaining national identity and promoting the new state internationally. Organizations such as the Lithuanian Emigrant Aid Society provided cultural and educational support abroad, while the government helped establish schools, libraries, and community centers in emigrant communities across the Americas. In 1935, the first World Lithuanian Congress was held in Kaunas, symbolizing both the vitality of the diaspora and the state's recognition of its global reach. At the same time, new Lithuanian settlements took root in South America, particularly in Argentina, Brazil, and Uruguay, where immigrants established parishes, choirs, and community halls that reflected their shared heritage. World War II and the Soviet occupation of Lithuania generated yet another wave of displacement, this time dominated by political refugees and forced deportations. Tens of thousands of Lithuanians fled westward in the face of advancing Soviet forces in 1944, while many others were deported to Siberia or Central Asia under Stalinist rule. In the immediate postwar years, tens of thousands found temporary refuge in displaced persons (DP) camps in Germany, Austria, and Italy, where Lithuanian schools, newspapers, and cultural institutions were re-established in exile. From these camps, many emigrated to the United States, Canada, Australia, and Western Europe, forming what came to be known as the postwar Lithuanian diaspora. This new generation of émigrés often viewed themselves as guardians of Lithuania's suppressed independence, establishing political organizations, academic institutions, and cultural centers dedicated to preserving national identity. Their communities became vocal advocates for Lithuanian sovereignty throughout the Cold War, ensuring that Lithuania's cause remained visible on the global stage even while the country was under Soviet rule. By the mid-20th century, the Lithuanian diaspora was firmly established across several continents. Its roots lay in centuries of migration and displacement—from the noble families of medieval Europe to the exiles of Tsarist Siberia and the laborers of America's industrial cities. These diverse communities were united by their efforts to sustain Lithuanian language, religion, and cultural traditions in foreign lands. Long before the late 20th century, the diaspora had become not only a repository of Lithuanian heritage but also a political and moral force that helped keep the idea of an independent Lithuania alive.

=== 21st century ===
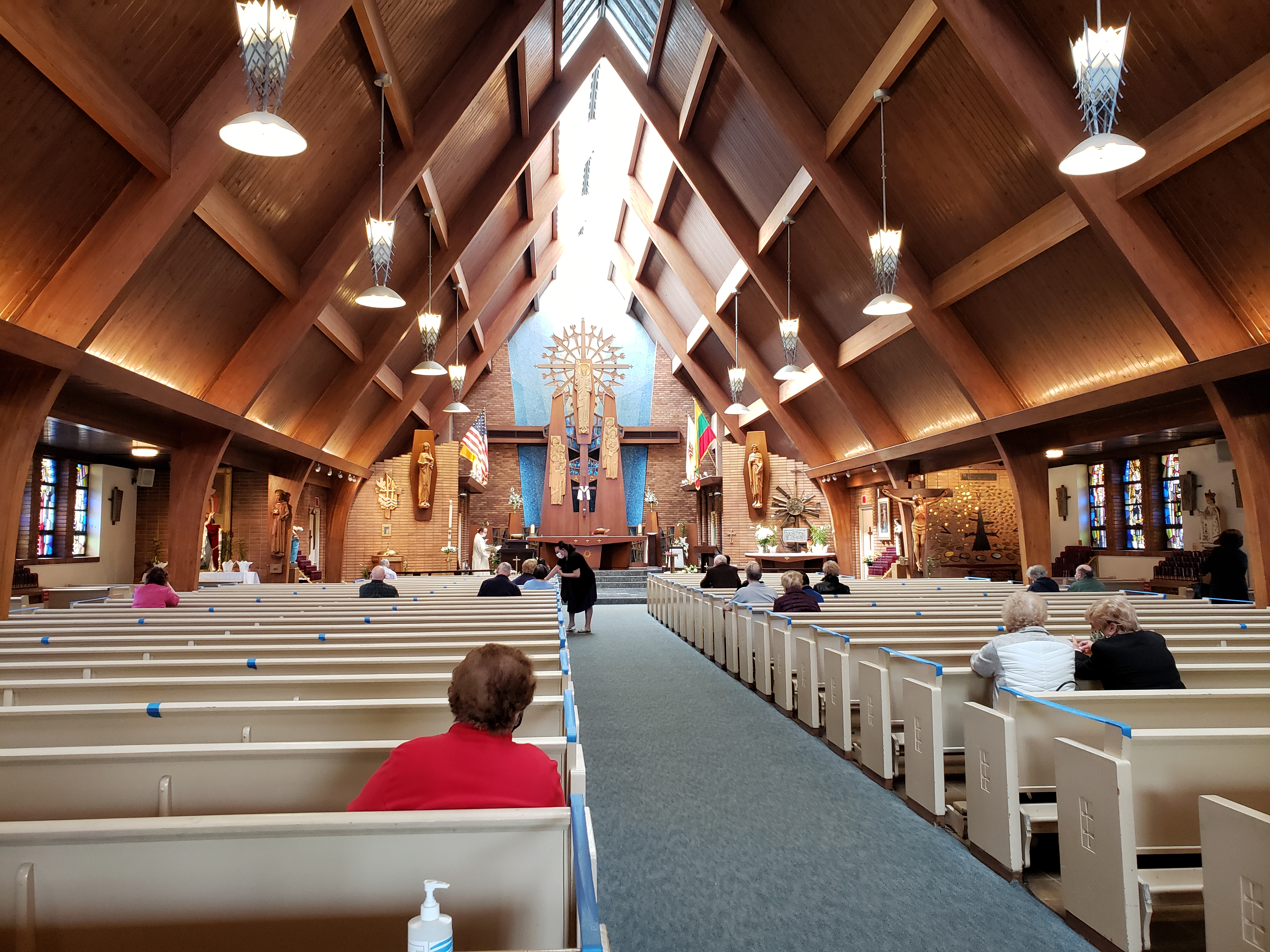
National flag of Lithuania hanging in the Transfiguration Catholic Church in Maspeth, Queens, New York

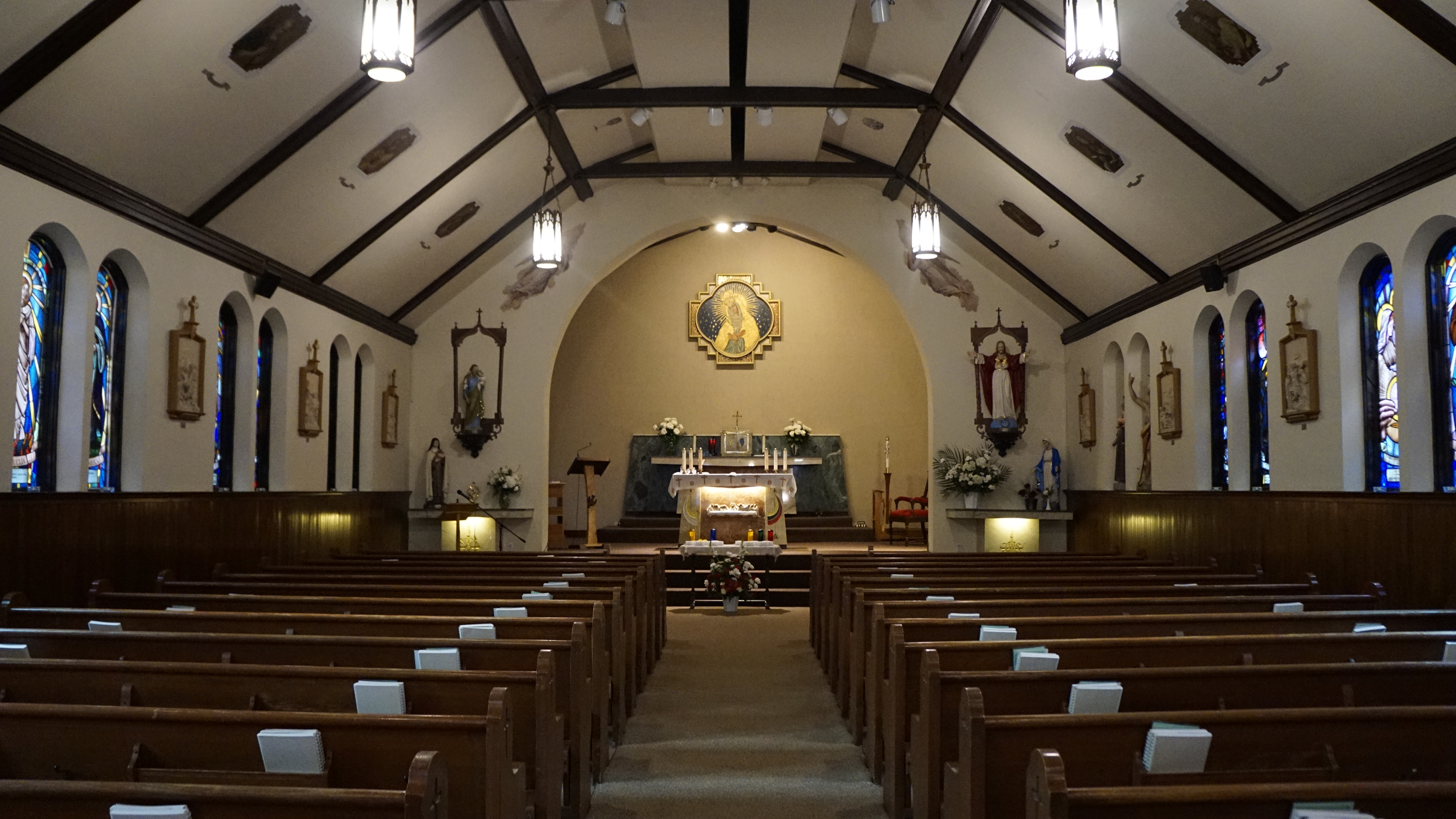
Interior of the Our Lady of Mercy Church in Hamilton, Ontario, Canada. The altar is decorated with the national flag of Lithuania.

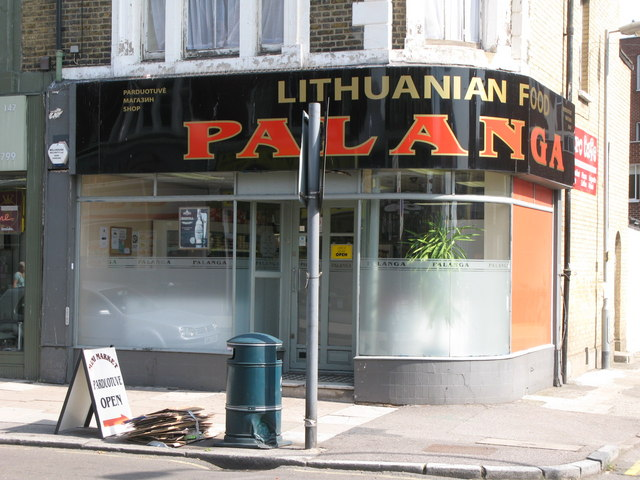
Lithuanian food store in London, named after the Lithuanian resort city Palanga

After Lithuania restored its independence, the Lithuanian World Community has served as a unifying link for Lithuanian communities and has acted as an intermediary in their cooperation with the state institutions of the Republic of Lithuania. July 17 is celebrated as World Lithuanian Unity Day.

Lithuanian settlement extends into adjacent countries that are now outside the modern Lithuanian state. A small Lithuanian community exists in the vicinity of Puńsk and Sejny in the Suwałki area of Poland, an area associated with the Lithuanian writer and cleric Antanas Baranauskas. Although most of the Lithuanian inhabitants in the region of Lithuania Minor that formed part of East Prussia were expelled when the area was annexed by the Soviet Union as the Kaliningrad Oblast, small groups of Lithuanians subsequently settled that area as it was repopulated with new Soviet citizens. Small groups of Lithuanians are still present in Belarus within the Grodno and Vitebsk regions.

Apart from the traditional communities in Lithuania and its neighbouring countries, Lithuanians also have a presence in other continents during the present day.

- Communities in the United States make up the largest part of this diaspora; as many as one million Americans can claim Lithuanian descent. Emigration to America began in the 19th century, with the generation calling itself the "grynoriai" (derived from "greenhorn" meaning new and inexperienced). The migration flow was interrupted during the Soviet occupation, when travel and emigration were severely restricted. The largest concentrations of Lithuanian Americans are in the Great Lakes area and the Northeast; Chicago in particular is noted as the primary center of the diaspora. Nearly 33,000 Lithuanians have immigrated to the United States since the fall of the Soviet Union in 1991.
- Lithuanian communities in Canada are among the largest in the world along with the United States (See Lithuanian Canadian).
- Lithuanian communities in Mexico and South America (Argentina, Brazil, Colombia, Uruguay and Venezuela) developed before World War II, beginning in the late 19th and early 20th centuries. Currently, there is no longer a flow of emigrants to these destinations, since economic conditions in those countries are not better than those in Lithuania (see Lithuanians in Brazil).
- Lithuanian communities were formed in South Africa during the late 19th and 20th century, the majority being Jewish.
- Lithuanian communities in other regions of the former Soviet Union were formed during the Soviet occupation; the numbers of Lithuanians in Siberia and Central Asia increased dramatically when a large portion of Lithuanians were involuntarily deported into these areas. After de-Stalinization, however, most of them returned. Later, some Lithuanians were relocated to work in other areas of the Soviet Union; some of them did not return to Lithuania, after it became independent.
- The Lithuanian communities in United Kingdom and Ireland began to appear after the restoration of independence to Lithuania in 1990; this emigration intensified after Lithuania became part of the European Union in 2004. London and Glasgow (especially the Bellshill and Coatbridge areas of Greater Glasgow) have long had large Catholic and Jewish Lithuanian populations. The Republic of Ireland probably has the highest concentration of Lithuanians relative to its total population size in Western Europe; its estimated 45,000 Lithuanians (about half of whom are registered) form over 1% of Ireland's total population. Lithuanian communities in the United Kingdom include major cities (London, Manchester, Leeds, Glasgow, Peterborough) and others.
- The Lithuanian communities in other countries of Northwestern Europe (Norway, Sweden, Denmark, the Netherlands, and Iceland) as well as in Spain are very new and began their growth spurts as Lithuanian was accepted into the EU. In Norway there are 45,415 Lithuanians living in the country and it has in a short time become the second largest ethnic minority in the country, making up 0.85% of Norway's total population, and 4.81% of all foreign residents in Norway. There are around 3,500 Lithuanians in Iceland, making around 1% of the total population.
- Lithuanian communities in Germany began to appear after World War II. In 1950 they founded the Lithuanian High School in Diepholz, which was a private school for children of Lithuanian refugees. For decades the Lithuanian High School was the only full-time high school outside the Eastern Bloc offering courses in Lithuanian history, language, and culture. In 1954, the Lithuanian Community acquired Rennhof Manor House with its twelve-acre park in the town of Lampertheim-Hüttenfeld. The school was relocated there and still exists today.
- Lithuanian communities in Australia exist as well; due to its great distance from Europe, however, emigration there was minuscule. There are Lithuanian communities in Melbourne, Geelong, Sydney, Adelaide, Brisbane, Hobart and Perth.

== Culture and traditions ==
The Lithuanian national sport is usually considered to be basketball (krepšinis), which is popular among Lithuanians in Lithuania as well as in the diasporic communities. Basketball came to Lithuania through the Lithuanian-American community in the 1930s. The Lithuania men's national basketball teams has won the EuroBasket three times (1937, 1939, 2003) and were bronze medal winners in the 1992, 1996, and 2000 Summer Olympics, while the Lithuania women's national basketball teams has won the EuroBasket Women in 1997 and silver medals in 1938.

Joninės (also known as Rasos) is a traditional national holiday, celebrated on the summer solstice. It has pagan origins. Užgavėnės (Shrove Tuesday) takes place on the day before Ash Wednesday, and is meant to urge the retreat of winter. There are also national traditions for Christian holidays such as Easter and Christmas.

=== Lifestyle ===
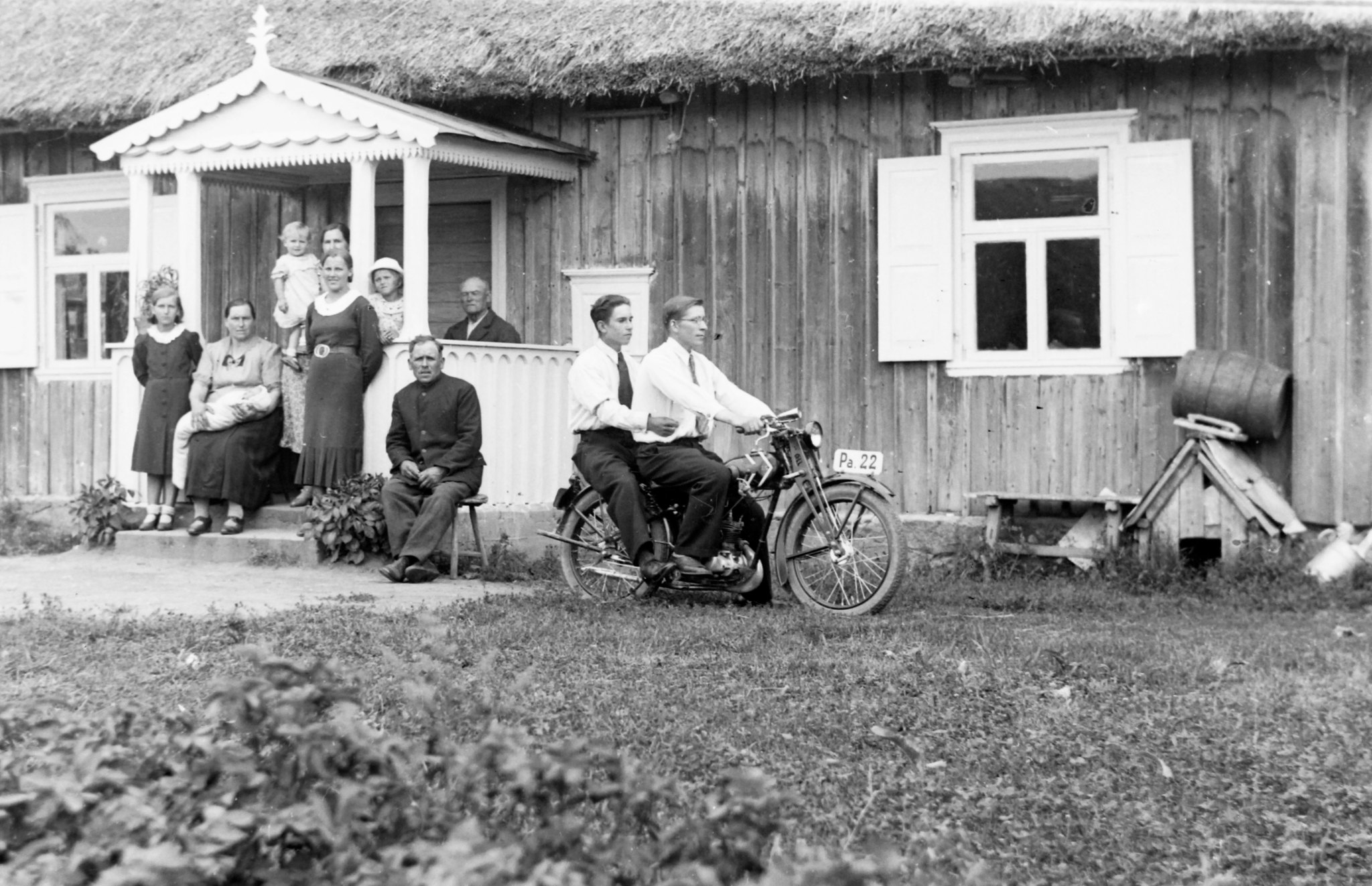
Lithuanian family living in a traditional homestead, Panevėžys District, 1939

Traditional Lithuanian lifestyle developed in close connection with the natural environment and agrarian economy that dominated until the modern era. From the Middle Ages through the early modern period, the majority of Lithuanians lived in dispersed rural settlements where mixed farming, animal husbandry, and craft production structured everyday rhythms. Households typically cultivated rye, barley, oats, peas, buckwheat, hemp, and flax, using simple wooden or iron-tipped ploughs pulled by horses or oxen. Cattle, pigs, sheep, and poultry provided milk, meat, wool, and hides, while forest foraging for mushrooms, berries, and honey remained an important supplement to agrarian subsistence, especially in forested southern and eastern regions. Villages were commonly organized as elongated rows or clustered around open commons; dwellings combined living quarters with barns, granaries, and stables arranged in a single yard. Social organization was strongly communal. Peasants shared obligations such as maintaining roads, ditches, and bridges, as well as cooperative fieldwork like ploughing and haymaking. Seasonal tasks and Christian feast days structured the agricultural calendar, giving rise to distinctive ritual cycles—harvest celebrations, midsummer fires, and family events blending pre-Christian and Catholic traditions. Local craftspeople, including smiths, weavers, and carpenters, produced household goods and tools, and markets served as centers of exchange. After serfdom was abolished in the mid-19th century, rural society experienced major transformation: land reforms encouraged the breakup of large estates and the creation of independent homesteads (vienkiemiai), while literacy, schooling, and contact with towns introduced new social ideals and patterns of consumption. In the 20th century, modernization and Soviet collectivization further reshaped Lithuanian lifestyle. Traditional farmsteads were absorbed into collective farms, mechanization reduced manual labor, and migration to towns and cities increased. Yet elements of the older way of life—family solidarity, attachment to land, seasonal festivals, and folk crafts—remained integral to national identity. Since the restoration of independence in 1990, many aspects of traditional rural culture have been revived through heritage movements, ethnographic museums, and renewed interest in local food, architecture, and crafts.

=== Cuisine ===
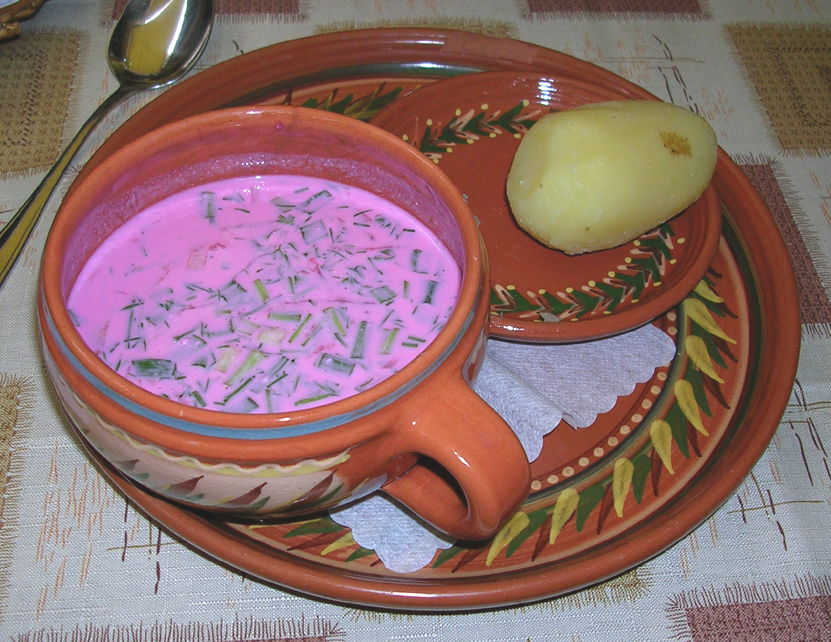
Šaltibarščiai, a Lithuanian variety of cold borscht with distinctively vibrant pink color

Lithuanian cuisine has much in common with other European cuisines and features the products suited to its cool and moist northern climate: barley, potatoes, rye, beets, greens, and mushrooms are locally grown, and dairy products are one of its specialties. Nevertheless, it has its own distinguishing features, which were formed by a variety of influences during the country's rich history.

Since shared similarities in history and heritage, Lithuanians, Jews and Poles have developed many similar dishes and beverages: dumplings ( koldūnai), doughnuts (spurgos), and crepes (lietiniai blynai). German traditions also influenced Lithuanian cuisine, introducing pork and potato dishes, such as potato pudding (kugelis) and potato sausages (vėdarai), as well as the baroque tree cake known as šakotis. Traditional dishes of Lithuanian Tatars and Lithuanian Karaites like Kibinai and čeburekai, that are similar to pasty, are popular in Lithuania.

For Lithuanian Americans both traditional Lithuanian dishes of virtinukai (cabbage and noodles) and balandėliai (rolled cabbage) are growing increasingly more popular.

There are also regional cuisine dishes, e.g. traditional kastinys in Žemaitija, Western Lithuania, Skilandis in Western and Central Lithuania, Kindziukas in Eastern and Southern Lithuania (Dzūkija).

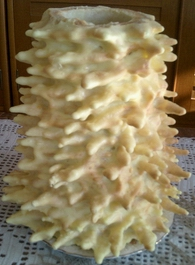
Lithuanian šakotis

Cepelinai, a stuffed potato creation, is the most popular national dish. It is popular among Lithuanians all over the world. Other national foods include dark rye bread, cold beet soup (šaltibarščiai), and kugelis (a baked potato pudding). Some of these foods are also common in neighbouring countries. Lithuanian cuisine is generally unknown outside Lithuanian communities. Most Lithuanian restaurants outside Lithuania are located in cities with a heavy Lithuanian presence.

Lithuanians in the early 20th century were among the thinnest people in the developed countries of the world. In Lithuanian cuisine there is some emphasis on attractive presentation of freshly prepared foods.

Lithuania has been brewing midus, a type of Lithuanian mead for thousands of years.

Locally brewed beer (alus), vodka (degtinė), and kvass (gira) are popular drinks in Lithuania. Lithuanian traditional beer of Northern Lithuania, Biržai, Pasvalys regions is well appreciated in Lithuania and abroad. Starka is a part of the Lithuanian heritage, still produced in Lithuania.

=== Language ===
Dialects of Lithuanian. Map of the dialects of the Lithuanian language based on the classification by linguist and baltist Zigmas Zinkevičius. Samogitian dialect: Western Samogitian Western Samogitian sub-dialect Northern Samogitian Sub-dialect of Kretinga Sub-dialect of Telšiai Southern Samogitian Sub-dialect of Varniai Sub-dialect of Raseiniai Aukštaitian dialect: Western Aukštaitian Sub-dialect of Šiauliai Sub-dialect of Kaunas Sub-dialect of Klaipėda Region Eastern Aukštaitian Sub-dialect of Panevėžys Sub-dialect of Širvintos Sub-dialect of Anykščiai Sub-dialect of Kupiškis Sub-dialect of Utena Sub-dialect of Vilnius Southern Aukštaitian Southern Aukštaitian or Dzūkian sub-dialect

Among Indo-European languages, Lithuanian is conservative in its grammar and phonology, retaining archaic features otherwise found only in ancient languages such as Sanskrit (particularly its early form, Vedic Sanskrit) or Ancient Greek. Thus, it is an important source for the reconstruction of the Proto-Indo-European language despite its late attestation (with the earliest texts dating only to c. 1500 A.D., whereas Ancient Greek was first written down in c. 1450 B.C.). There was fascination with the Lithuanian people and their language among the late 19th-century researchers, and the philologist Isaac Taylor wrote the following in his The Origin of the Aryans (1892):

"Thus it would seem that the Lithuanians have the best claim to represent the primitive Aryan race, as their language exhibits fewer of those phonetic changes, and of those grammatical losses which are consequent on the acquirement of a foreign speech."

The Proto-Balto-Slavic language branched off directly from Proto-Indo-European, then sub-branched into Proto-Baltic and Proto-Slavic. Proto-Baltic branched off into Proto-West Baltic and Proto-East Baltic. Baltic languages passed through a Proto-Balto-Slavic stage, from which Baltic languages retain numerous exclusive and non-exclusive lexical, morphological, phonological and accentual isoglosses in common with the Slavic languages, which represent their closest living Indo-European relatives. Moreover, with Lithuanian being so archaic in phonology, Slavic words can often be deduced from Lithuanian by regular sound laws; for example, Lith. vilkas and Polish wilk ← PBSl. *wilkás (cf. PSl. *vьlkъ) ← PIE *wĺ̥kʷos, all meaning "wolf". Lithuanian preserves a remarkably archaic grammatical structure, including a seven-case system, the use of the dual number, and a complex set of participles, features that have disappeared from most other modern Indo-European languages. Its phonology retains distinctions such as a pitch-accent system comparable to that of Vedic Sanskrit and Ancient Greek, allowing for nuanced differences in word meaning based on intonation. The language's conservatism is further evident in numerous lexical correspondences with ancient Indo-European tongues—for example, Lithuanian sūnus ("son") parallels Sanskrit sūnúḥ and Old English sunu, while dūmas ("smoke") corresponds to Latin fumus, all deriving from the same Proto-Indo-European roots. These features make Lithuanian an invaluable tool for historical linguists seeking to reconstruct the sounds and structures of Proto-Indo-European.

=== Literature ===
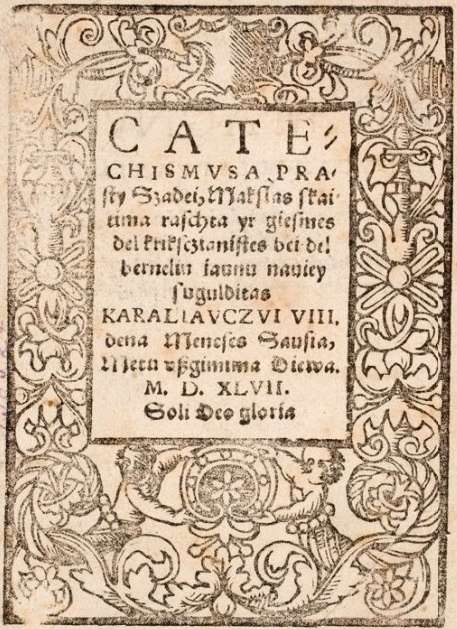
First Lithuanian book (1547) The Simple Words of Catechism by Martynas Mažvydas

When the ban against printing the Lithuanian language was lifted in 1904, various European literary movements such as Symbolism, impressionism, and expressionism each in turn influenced the work of Lithuanian writers. The first period of Lithuanian independence (1918–1940) gave them the opportunity to examine themselves and their characters more deeply, as their primary concerns were no longer political. An outstanding figure of the early 20th century was Vincas Krėvė-Mickevičius, a novelist and dramatist. His many works include Dainavos šalies senų žmonių padavimai (Old Folks Tales of Dainava, 1912) and the historical dramas Šarūnas (1911), Skirgaila (1925), and Mindaugo mirtis (The Death of Mindaugas, 1935). Petras Vaičiūnas was another popular playwright, producing one play each year during the 1920s and 1930s. Vincas Mykolaitis-Putinas wrote lyric poetry, plays, and novels, including the novel Altorių šešėly (In the Shadows of the Altars, 3 vol., 1933), a remarkably powerful autobiographical novel.

Keturi vėjai movement started with publication of The Prophet of the Four Winds by talented poet Kazys Binkis (1893—1942). It was rebellion against traditional poetry. The theoretical basis of Keturi vėjai initially was futurism which arrived through Russia from the West and later cubism, dadaism, surrealism, unanimism, and German expressionism. The most influensive futurist for Lithuanian writers was Russian poet Vladimir Mayakovsky.

Oskaras Milašius (1877–1939) is a paradoxical and interesting phenomenon in Lithuanian culture. He never lived in Lithuania but was born and spent his childhood in Cereja (near Mogilev, Belarus) and graduated from Lycée Janson de Sailly in Paris. His longing for his fatherland was more metaphysical. Having to choose between two conflicting countries — Lithuania and Poland — he preferred Lithuania which for him was an idea even more than a fatherland. In 1920 when France recognized the independence of Lithuania, he was appointed officially as Chargé d'Affaires for Lithuania. He published: 1928, a collection of 26 Lithuanian songs; 1930, Lithuanian Tales and Stories; 1933, Lithuanian Tales; 1937, The origin of the Lithuanian Nation.

=== Religion ===
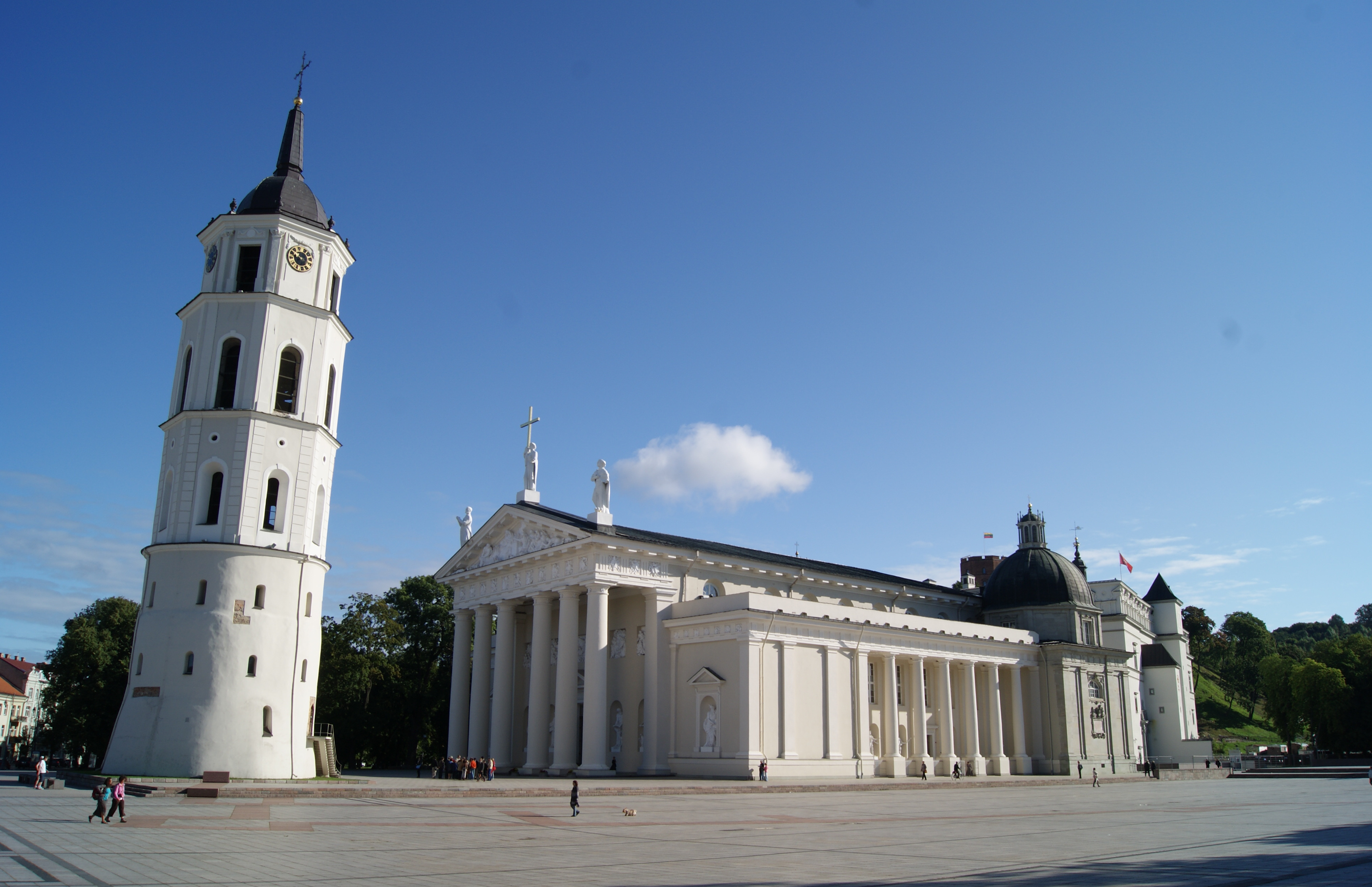
The Roman Catholic Vilnius Cathedral in the center of Vilnius, the capital of Lithuania

Since the Christianization of parts of Lithuania proper in 1387 and of Samogitia in 1413, the majority of Lithuanians have been members of the Roman Catholic Church. According to the 2021 census, 74% of Lithuanians are Roman Catholic. Under Article 26 of the Constitution of Lithuania, persons can freely practice a religion of their choosing.

Lutheranism is still widely practiced in Lithuania minor region and nearby territories (e.g. Klaipėda, Šilutė, Tauragė, Jurbarkas, Pagėgiai, Kretinga, Kretingalė, Kintai, Dovilai, etc.) and it is lectured in some schools. Protestant heritage is also present in other parts of Lithuania, namely Vilnius, Kaunas, Kėdainiai, Biržai, Alkiškiai, etc.

Catholicism played a significant role in Lithuanian anti-communist resistance under the Soviet Union. Several Catholic priests were leaders of the anti-communist movements, and thousands of Latin crosses were placed on the Hill of Crosses near Šiauliai, despite its being bulldozed in 1961.

=== Folk music ===
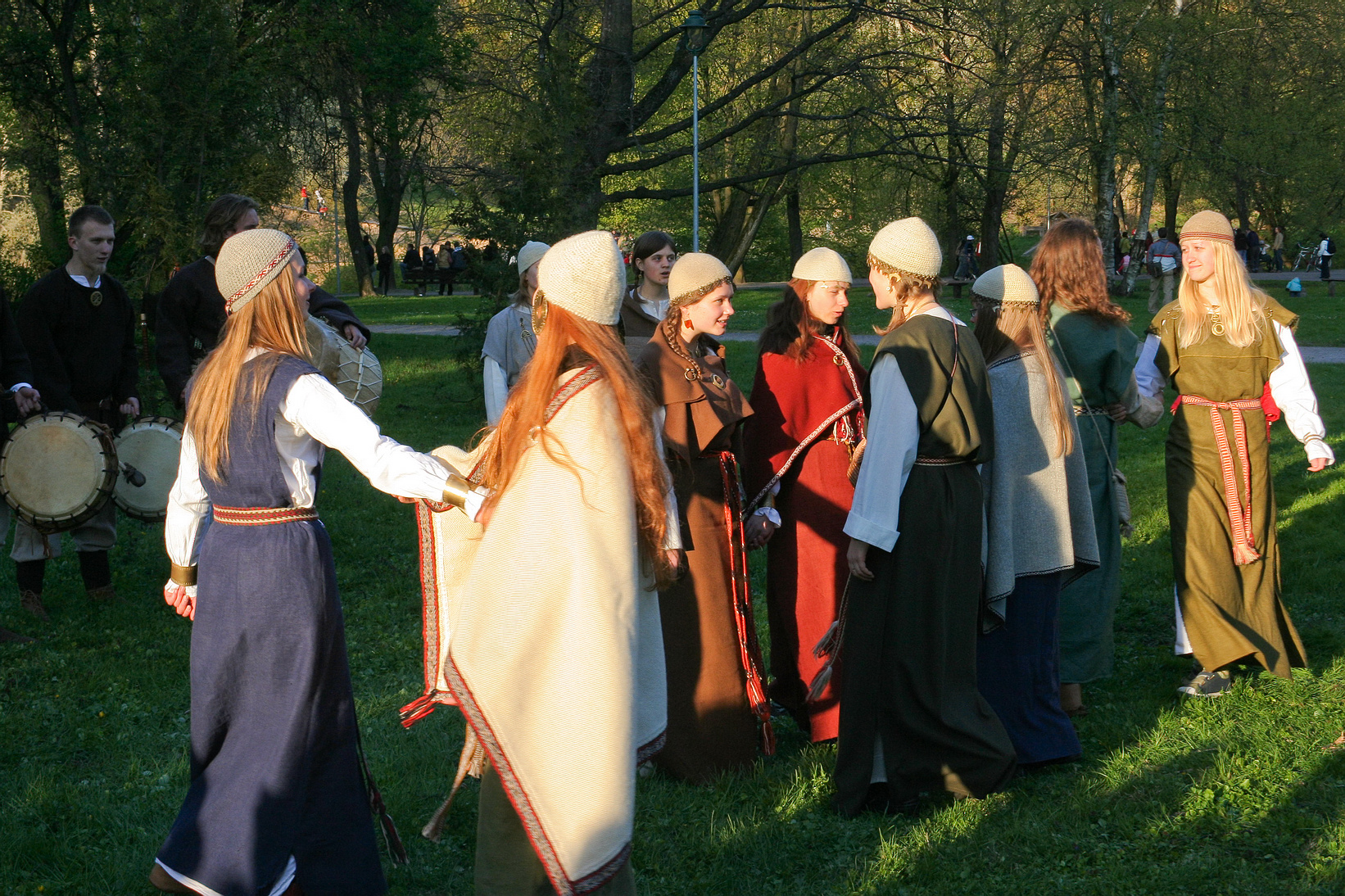
Lithuanian folklore band Kulgrinda performing in Vilnius

Lithuanian folk music is based around songs (dainos), which include romantic and wedding songs, as well as work songs and archaic war songs. These songs used to be performed either in groups or alone, and in parallel chords or unison. Duophonic songs are common in the renowned sutartinės tradition of Aukštaitija. Another style of Lithuanian folk music is called rateliai, a kind of round dance. Instrumentation includes kanklės, a kind of zither that accompanies sutartinės, rateliai, waltzes, quadrilles and polkas, and fiddles, (including a bass fiddle called the basetle) and a kind of whistle called the Lamzdeliai lumzdelis; recent importations, beginning in the late 19th century, including the concertina, accordion and bandoneon. Sutartinė can be accompanied by skudučiai, a form of panpipes played by a group of people, as well as wooden trumpets (ragai and dandytės). Kanklės is an extremely important folk instrument, which differs in the number of strings and performance techniques across the country. Other traditional instruments include švilpas whistle, drums and tabalas (a percussion instrument like a gong), sekminių ragelis (bagpipe) and the pūslinė, a musical bow made from a pig's bladder filled with dried peas.

=== Folk crafts ===
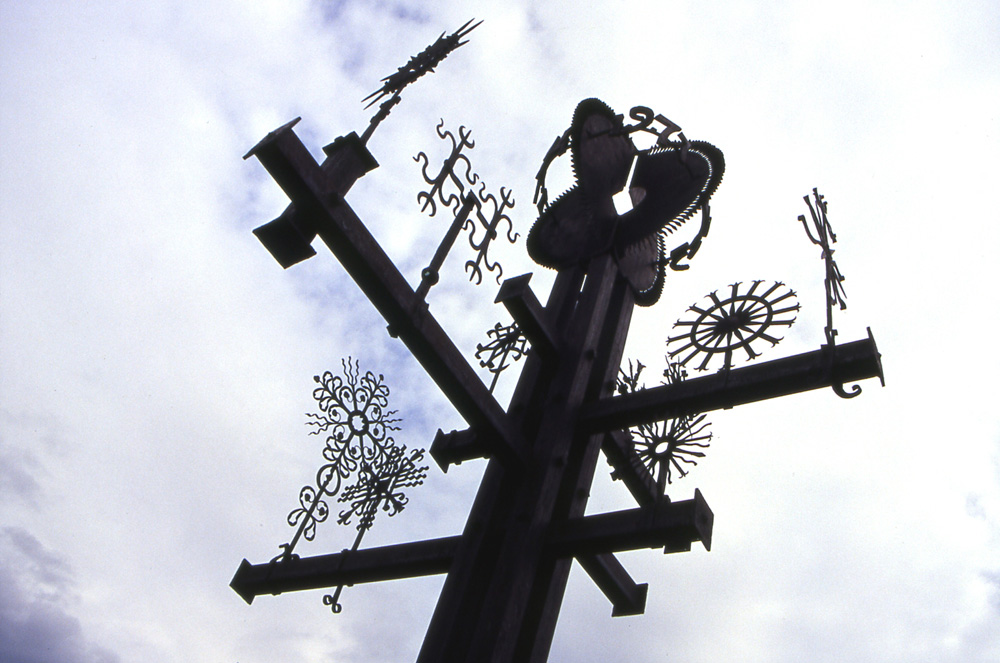
Traditional art of Lithuanian cross crafting inscribed in the UNESCO Intangible Cultural Heritage List

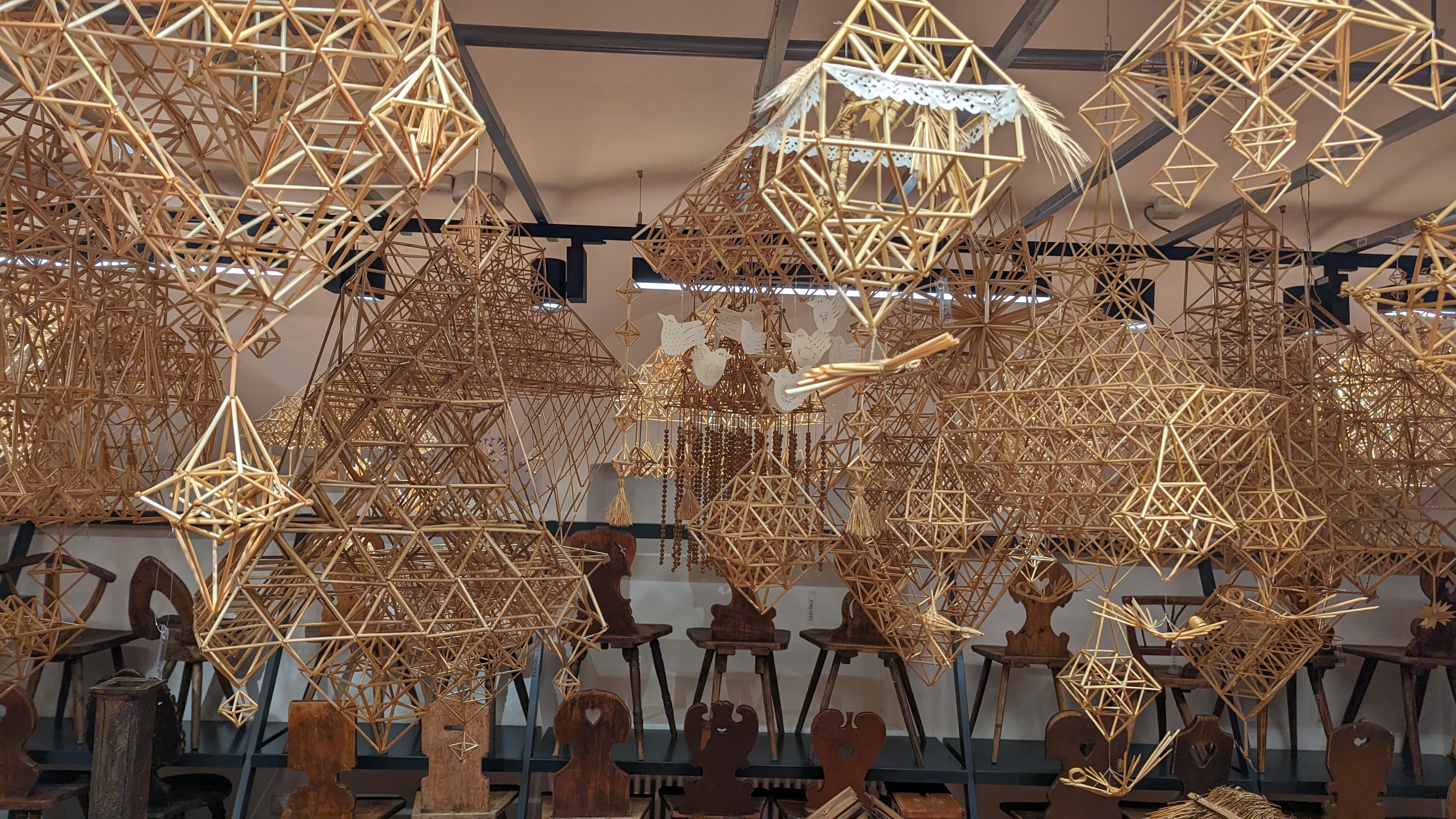
Traditional Lithuanian Sodai inscribed in the UNESCO Intangible Cultural Heritage List

Lithuanian folk crafts embody a richly interwoven tradition of material, technique and symbolism, rooted in everyday life yet suffused with artistic intent and regional identity. Among these crafts, metal jewellery emerged as a significant form from the Bronze Age onwards: necklaces, bracelets, brooches, rings and pendants were made of bronze and silver, while amber—already used in the Neolithic period—entered jewellery production in earnest in the early modern era, often combined with metals like melchior and silver. Wooden objects likewise constitute a foundational strand: spinning and weaving tools, domestic utensils and furniture, children's toys and musical instruments were carved and decorated by rural craftsmen using motifs such as stars, hearts, plant tendrils, birds or serpents; ornamentation ranged from simple incised lines to high-relief carving and polychrome painting, with distinct regional colour palettes (for example dark backgrounds with vivid green, brown and blue in Žemaitija, lighter tones in Aukštaitija). Metalwork in the broader sense (beyond jewellery) also features prominently: wrought iron was employed for sleigh and wagon fittings, door-handles and locks, but most striking are the iron crosses installed on waysides, chapel-pillars and roof-tops, often topped with wind-vanes and decorated with geometric (circles, squares, rhombi, triangles) or flowing line motifs from the mid-20th century. Meanwhile the tradition of basketry and wickerwork (pinti dirbiniai) forms another key dimension in Lithuanian craft: utilitarian and decorative objects such as baskets, dowries' chests, sieves and chairs were woven using spiral or cross-weave techniques from hazel rods, willow withes, split spruce or pine roots, pine cones and rye straw. Taken together, these craft traditions reflect a cultural continuum whereby rural artisans transformed raw materials available in the Lithuanian landscape into objects of both functional and symbolic significance—and thereby contributed to a vernacular aesthetic language that endures and evolves to the present.

== See also ==
- Lithuania
- Lithuania Minor
- Baltic states
- List of Lithuanians
- List of Lithuanian philosophers
- Lithuanian American
- Lithuanians in the United Kingdom
- Lithuanian Scots
- Lithuanians in Brazil
- Lithuanian minority in Poland
