= List of Lithuanian philosophers =

This is a list of Lithuanian philosophers:

== A ==
- Mantas Adomėnas
- Antanas Andrijauskas
- Loreta Anilionytė

== B ==
- Audrius Beinorius

== D ==
- Mykolas Dluskis
- Leonidas Donskis
- Pranas Dovydaitis

== G ==
- Bronislovas Genzelis
- Juozas Girnius

== J ==
- Arvydas Juozaitis

== K ==
- Bronius Kuzmickas

== L ==
- Alphonso Lingis

== M ==
- Antanas Maceina
- Jokūbas Minkevičius

== P ==
- Rolandas Pavilionis
- Romanas Plečkaitis
- Nerija Putinaitė

== S ==
- Vasily Seseman
- Stasys Šalkauskis

== V ==
- Nida Vasiliauskaitė
- Vydūnas
