= Vytautas Magnus University Agriculture Academy =

University in Lithuania

Coordinates: 54°53′38″N 23°50′06″E

VMU Agriculture Academy
- Vytauto Didžiojo universiteto Žemės ūkio akademija
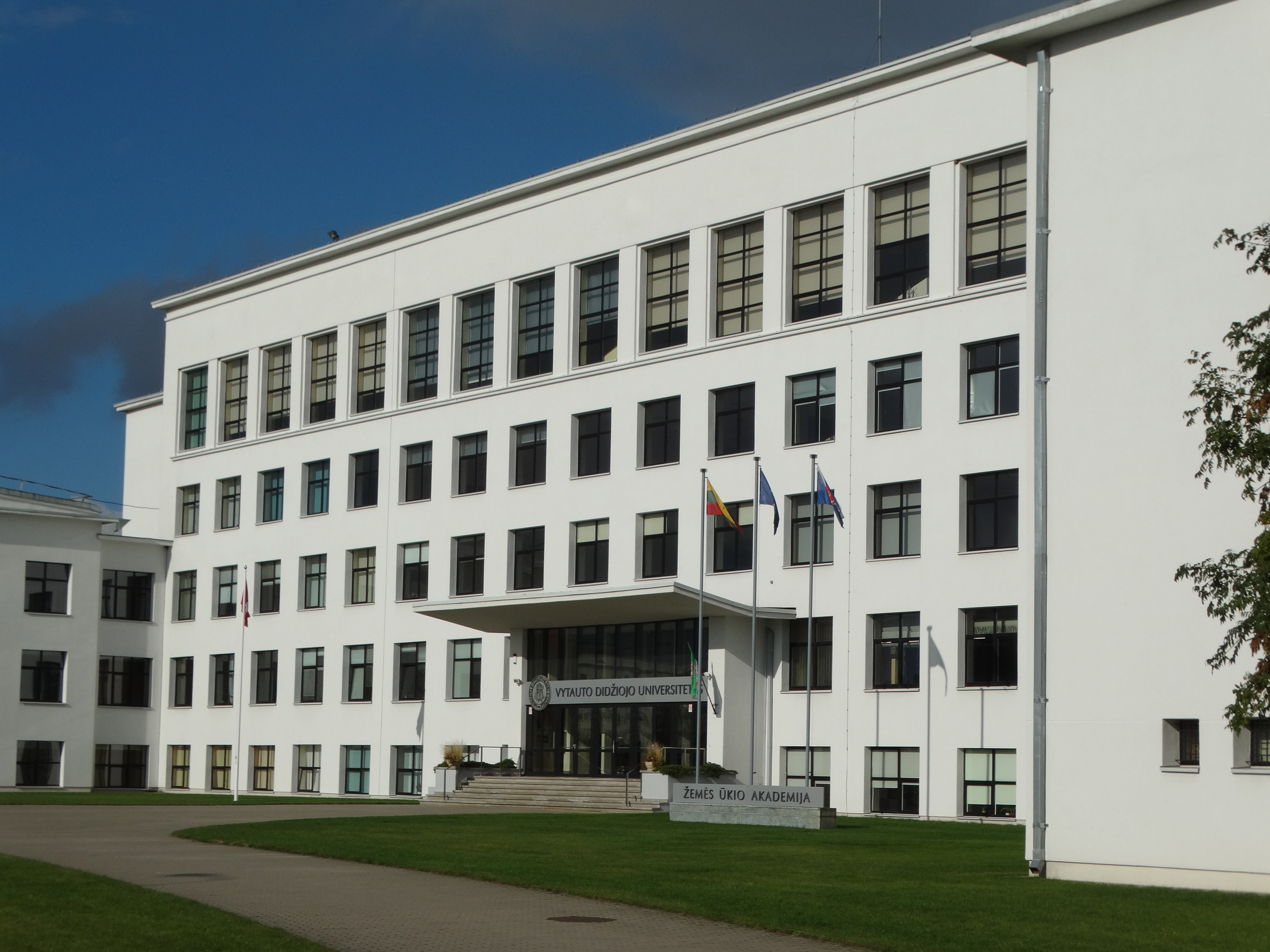
- Type: Public
- Established: 1924; 2019
- Location: Akademija, Lithuania
- Campus: College town
- Website: https://zua.vdu.lt/en/

Vytautas Magnus University Agriculture Academy (Lithuanian: Vytauto Didžiojo universiteto Žemės ūkio akademija) is a state institution of higher education and research in Lithuania. It is a part of the Vytautas Magnus University. The academy is located in Akademija, west of Kaunas.

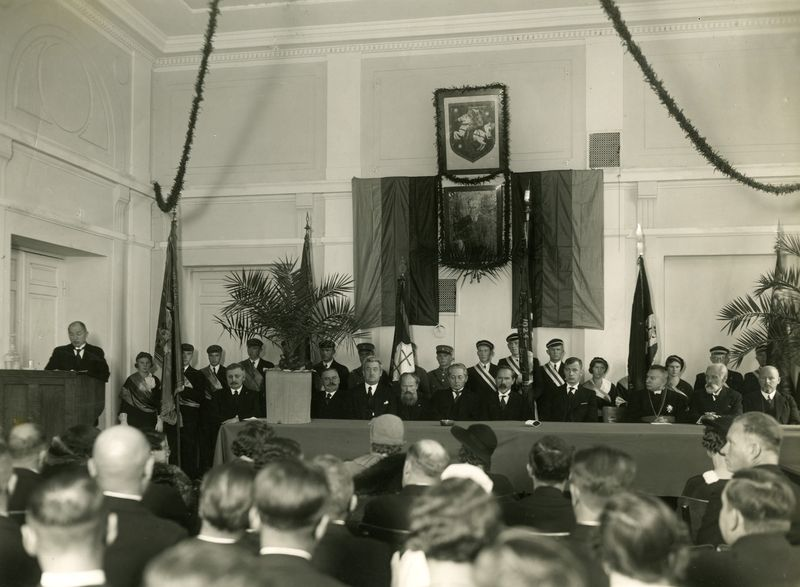
Academy of Agriculture 10 years anniversary celebration (1934)

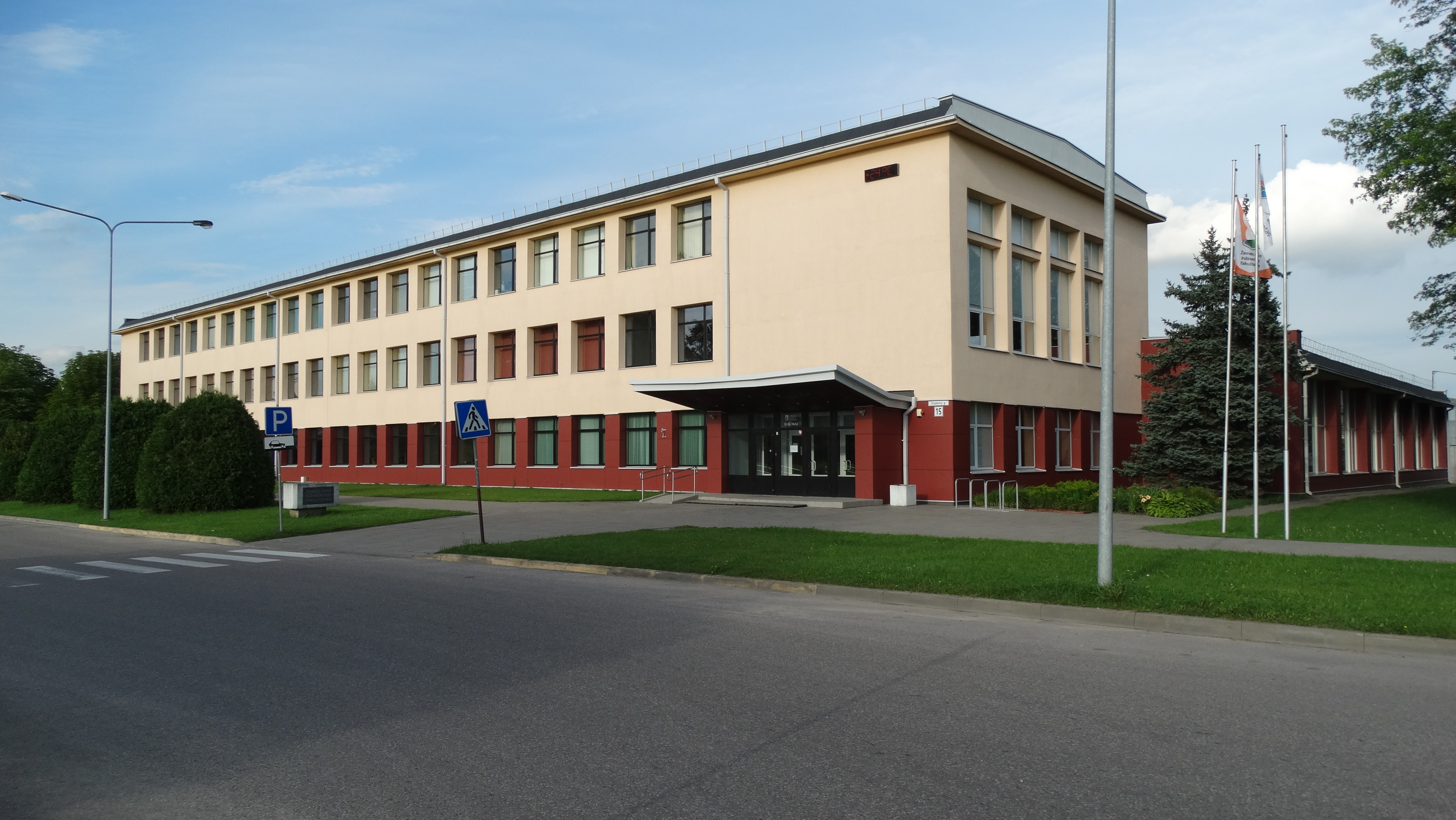
Faculty of engineering

Horse riding contests are held by VMU Agriculture Academy

VMU Agriculture Academy

== History ==
After restructuring the Agronomy–Forestry Department at the University of Lithuania (in Kaunas) and Dotnuva Agricultural College, the Agricultural Academy was established on September 3, 1924, in Dotnuva.

The Council of Professors and the first rector of the academy, professor Povilas Matulionis, were elected. Despite the complicated economic situation in Lithuania and that the government could hardly support the newly established higher school, the academy developed and grew stronger. In 1924–1937, 125 graduates passed the final examinations and defended diploma theses. However, World War II disrupted usual work. Many of the professors and lecturers from the academy were deported to Siberia, and others were able to escape deportation by withdrawing to Western countries.

In 1945 the academy was transferred to Kaunas. In the beginning of 1946 Faculty of Agricultural Mechanization and Faculty of Water and Land Exploitation were established. As the number of students increased and Extramural department was established, it was decided to build a new campus of Lithuanian Academy of Agriculture in the outskirts of Kaunas. In 1964 the academy was moved to the new campus in Noreikiškės, suburb of Kaunas.

The faculties of Water and Land Management and Economics with lecture-rooms, training laboratories were settled in the campus in 1979. The building of Forest Management Department received the first students in 1982. As a component the campus nine dormitories for students and residential area where most of the staff university live were built. The training premises were equipped and Experimental station was established.

After the independence of Lithuania was reestablished in 1990, the new system of studies was implemented. New qualification degrees (e.g., Bachelor, Certified specialist, Master), together with new concepts such as modules and credits, were introduced. Fundamental theoretical subjects became the basis of studies and learning. Applied studies were organized under the resolution of the Councils of Faculties. In this way Lithuanian Academy of Agriculture became a university. Under the resolution of Parliament on October 8, 1996, Lithuanian Academy of Agriculture was granted the name of Lithuanian University of Agriculture. The university was renamed to Aleksandras Stulginskis University (ASU) on 16 August 2011.

Aleksandras Stulginskis (1885-1969) was the first Minister of Agriculture in 1919 and Second President of Lithuanian Republic (1920-1926). He was the initiator and creator of land reform in Lithuania on 1919–1922, founder of Lithuanian Farmers Union in 1919.

On 13 January 2018, the Parliament of Lithuania ruled that Aleksandras Stulginskis University (ASU) was integrated into Vytautas Magnus University and renamed to Vytautas Magnus University Agriculture Academy (VMU Agriculture Academy).

== Present ==
VMU Agriculture Academy includes the following subdivisions:

- five faculties — Agricultural Engineering, Agronomy, Economics and Management, Forestry and Ecology, Water and Land Management;
- three institutes — Institute of Rural Culture, Institute of Fundamental Sciences and Institute of Environment;
- 35 departments; Career Centre; Experimental station; Arboretum; Training farm.

Pedagogical personnel of the University include 377 people: 45 professors and doctor habilitatus, 152 associated professors, 106 lectors, 74 assistants, 50 researchers.

The university occupies area of 719 ha. There are five training buildings with 82 lecturing rooms, 80 laboratories, library with funds of 522.000 books (volumes).

== Administration ==
Legislative bodies of the academy are the Academic Assembly, University Council and University Senate. Executive bodies are the Chancellor and Chancellor's office.

- Chancellor Prof. Astrida Miceikienė
- Deputy chancellor Prof. Aušra Blinstrubienė

== Studies ==
The VMU Agriculture Academy provides three cycles of studies: first cycle basic (undergraduate) studies (Bachelor studies), second cycle master's degree (graduate) studies, and third cycle (postgraduate) doctoral (PhD) studies. After first cycle studies graduates receive bachelor's degree in the corresponding field. The basic studies take four years; part-time studies take six years.

Having finished the basic studies the graduate have a possibility of studies for master's degree. The duration of second cycle studies for MSc degree is two years (part-time studies: three years). After Master studies the diploma of master's degree is conferred and the graduates have a right to be admitted to the third cycle doctoral studies.

The BSc (total number – 15) and MSc (17) programs (presented at the description of the faculties) are provided in three study areas:

- Biomedical Sciences;
- Social Sciences;
- Technological Sciences.

The main study volume unit is study subject (or module), which includes various forms of studies: lectures, laboratory work, training, seminars, student's individual work, projects etc. The unit of subject volume is credit. The duration and extent of studies are expressed in ECTS credit points. One credit point refers to 26,7 hours. A student admitted on to a degree programme is eligible to receive the Diploma upon successful completion of corresponding number of credits and after successful defence of final degree work. Compulsory parts of doctoral studies are studies, research and dissertation.

The academic year at the VMU Agriculture Academy is divided into two semesters, 20 weeks each:

- Autumn semester begins on September 1;
- Spring semester, begins in the first week of February.

== ERASMUS studies ==
VMU Agriculture Academy provides the students’ and teachers’ ERASMUS exchange with more than 80 universities in 25 European countries. University is a partner in ERABEE, EUROBIOTECH, ISEKI, ISLE a.o. thematic networks and different other projects under ERASMUS programme. University receives incoming students from partner universities in Spain, Czech Republic, Austria, Germany, Italy, Portugal, France, Turkey.

ERASMUS teaching staff mobility has increasing tendency. The main countries of teacher exchange are Austria, Germany, Italy, Latvia, Estonia, Greece, Spain, Finland, Denmark and Belgium. Teacher mobility is important segment of academic development and contributes to renewing teaching material and methods, strengthening relations between universities and teachers, increasing professional competency of teaching staff;

Institutional LLP/ERASMUS Coordinator assoc. prof. Raimundas Rukuiža

== Notable alumni ==
- Povilas Aksomaitis (1938–2004), Lithuanian engineer and politician
- Audrius Beinorius (born 1964), Lithuanian philosopher and orientalist
- Antanas Būdvytis (1928–1998), Soviet and Lithuanian agronomist and politician
- Ramūnas Karbauskis (born 1969), Lithuanian businessman and politician
- Viktoras Pranckietis (born 1958), Lithuanian agronomist and politician
- Arvydas Sabonis (born 1964), former professional basketball player

== See also ==
- List of forestry universities and colleges
