= Povilas Aksomaitis =

Engineer, politician

Povilas Aksomaitis (29 March 1938 – 23 August 2004) was a Lithuanian engineer, politician, and signatory of the 1990 Act of the Re-Establishment of the State of Lithuania.

== Biography ==
Born in Kaunas, Aksomaitis and his family were exiled to Barnaul, Russia, soon after the Soviet occupation of Lithuania during World War II. He was brought back to Lithuania by the International Red Cross in September 1946. After graduating from a secondary school in Kaunas, he studied hydropower engineering at the Lithuanian University of Agriculture. After graduation, he was appointed to the Hydrotechnics and Melioration Research Institute in Kėdainiai. As a scientist, he wrote over 100 academic articles and co-authored four books.

His involvement in the independence movement during the 1980s included arranging the return of the remains of Lithuanian deportees to Siberia. He was elected a member of the Supreme Council of the Republic of Lithuania in 1990. As a member of the Homeland Union, he was elected to the Municipal Council of the Kėdainiai district municipality in 1995.

Aksomaitis was awarded a Medal of Lithuanian Independence in 2000. He died in 2004 following complications of a kidney transplant almost twenty years ago.
