= Akademija, Kaunas =

Akademija
- Town
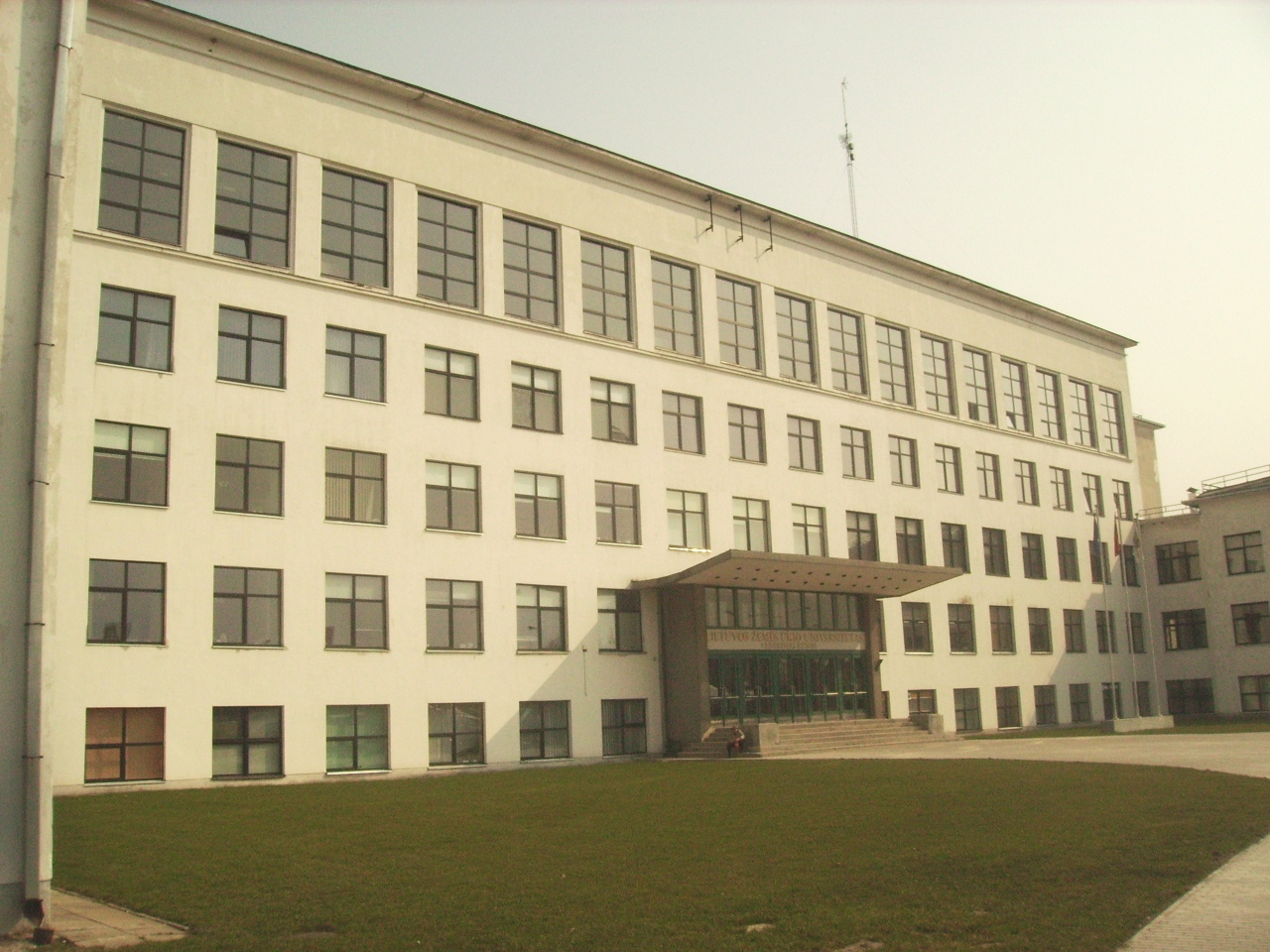
- Aleksandras Stulginskis University

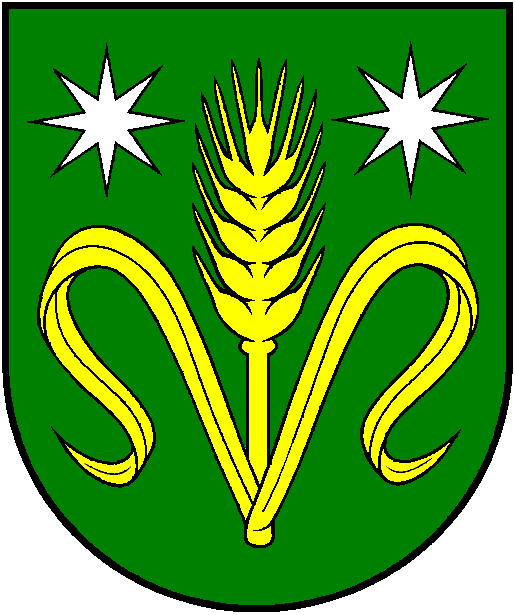
- Coat of arms

- Location in Lithuania
- Coordinates: 54°53′40″N 23°50′10″E
- Country: Lithuania
- County: Kaunas County
- Municipality: Kaunas district municipality
- Eldership: Akademija eldership
- Capital of: Akademija eldership

Population (2021)
  - Total: 2,928
- Time zone: UTC+2 (EET)
  - Summer (DST): UTC+3 (EEST)

Akademija is a town in Lithuania, located in Kaunas district municipality, Kaunas County . According to the 2011 census, the town has a population of 2,807 people. The town began to grow in 1964, when Lithuanian University of Agriculture was transferred to nearby Noreikiškės village. The town was created in 1999 of portions of Noreikiškės and Ringaudai settlements.
