= Audrius Beinorius =

Lithuanian philosopher, orientalist (born 1964)

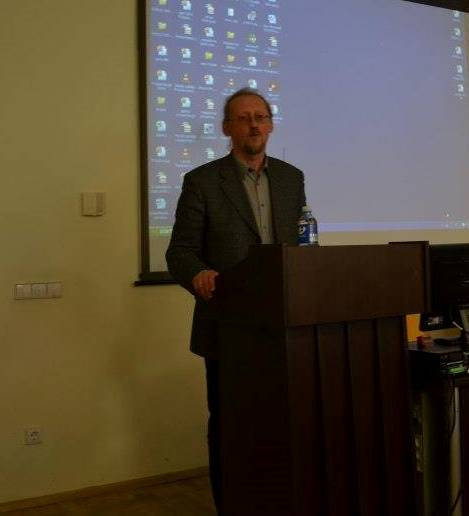
- Born: September 28, 1964 (age 61); Vilnius, Lithuania
- Education: Academy of Agriculture
- Scientific career
- Fields: Indology, Buddhist studies, Indian philosophy
- Workplaces: Vilnius University, Institute of Asian and Transcultural Studies

Audrius Beinorius (born September 28, 1964) is a Lithuanian philosopher, orientalist (specialist of Indology, Buddhist studies and Comparative Studies), translator, Habilitated Doctor of Humane Letters.

In 1988, he finished landscape management studies at the Academy of Agriculture. Later he moved to India where during four years he studied Indology, Buddhology and Indian languages (Sanskrit, Pali, Bengali, at the Ramakrishna Mission Institute of Culture in Calcutta. In 1996, Beinorius become a lecturer at the Center of Orientalist Studies at Vilnius University. In 1998, he earned a Doctor of Philosophy degree from Lithuanian Institute of Philosophy. He became a Assoc. Prof. in 2000 and a full professor in 2007. 2004-2014 A. Beinorius was the director of the Center of Oriental Studies at Vilnius University, Lithuania. He has been doing the research work in Great Britain (Oriental Institute, Oxford, 2000), the Netherlands (Leiden, International Institute for Asian Studies, IIAS, in 2004–2005), France (Sorbonne, 2012), Brown University (US, Fulbright scholar in 2008–2009), Japan (Nanzan Institute for Religion and Culture, under Japan Foundation Scholarship, 2008), in India (RM Institute of Culture (Kolkata), Sarnath Institute for Higher Tibetan Studies, JNU Institute of Advanced Studies, New Delhi 2013–1014), Institute of South Asian Studies at Heidelberg University (2015). Has been lecturing at La Sapienza University (Rome), University of Iceland (Reykjavik), University of Malta, University of Ghent, Calcutta University, DevSanskriti Vishvavidyalaya, Haridwar. 2018-2020 - Professor of Asian religions at Tartu University, Estonia.

The main research fields of interest of prof. A. Beinorius include: the Perception of Indian culture in the West, Indian philosophy, Indian religious history (Buddhism and Hinduism), Indian astrology and cosmology, Cultural Psychology, Postcolonial Studies, Methodologies of Comparative Religion Studies, Classical Indian psychology, Western Esoteric Movements in India (Theosophy and Freemasonry). 2010-2018 - a founder and director of Confucius Institute (CI) at Vilnius University. 2000-2015 - Editor-in-chief of academic journal Acta Orientalia Vilnensia.

A.Beinorius has written more than 90 scholarly papers in English, Lithuanian, Polish, and Russian, has published four monographs, two teaching tools, made many translations from Sanskrit, Pali, Russian, English, French, German.

== Publications ==
Books:

- The Consciousness in Classical Indian Philosophy, 2002 (Lithuanian)
- Imagining Otherness: Postcolonial Perspective to Indian Religious Culture, 2007 (English)
- India and the West: Layers of Cultural Interaction, 2012 (Lithuanian)
- Development of Indian Buddhism, 2010 (Lithuanian)
- Introduction to Indian and Buddhist Studies, 2003 (Lithuanian)
- Samvada: Philosoophical Conversations with India, 2024 (Lithuanian)

Besides many other, the most significant his translations into Lithuanian are:

- Dhammapada, 2005 and 2024 (from Pali);
- Dhammacakkapavattana sutta, 2005 (from Pali);
- The Upanishads, 2007, 2013, 2025 (from Sanskrit);
- Mandūkya Upanishada Gaudapada Karika;
- Patanjali's Yoga sūtra, 2000;
- Fragments from Pali Tipitaka, Šantideva's Bodhicharyavatara, Abhinavagupta's Paramarthasara, Manavadharmashastra, Natyašastra, Vishnudharmotara Purana, Vatsyayana's Kamasūtra, Nagarjuna's Mūlamadhyamaka Karika, Brahmasūtra Shankara Bhashya, and other.
