= Sigutė Stonytė =

Lithuanian soprano and professor

- Education: Lithuanian Academy of Music and Theatre
- Occupation: Opera singer
- Years active: 1985–present

Sigutė Stonytė is a Lithuanian soprano and professor at the Lithuanian Academy of Music and Theatre.

== Early life and education ==
Stonytė graduated from the Lithuanian Academy of Music and Theatre in 1982, studying under Z. Paulauskas. In 1982-1984 she also studied with vocal teacher Joana Kepenienė.

== Singing career ==
In 1984, Stonytė won the International Competition for Singers in Riga and a year later made her debut at the Lithuanian National Opera and Ballet Theatre (LNOBT) as Tatyana in Pyotr Tchaikovsky‘s opera Eugene Onegin.

In 1991, Stonytė won the second prize at the International Marian Anderson Vocal Arts Competition in Maryland, USA (first prize was not awarded).

Stonytė's latest role was Desdemona in Verdi's Otello (directed by Eimuntas Nekrošius).

Stonytė has sung around 30 soprano parts ranging from Bach to Britten and has also performed chamber pieces (including Schumann’s Frauenliebe und Leben, Mahler’s Rueckert-Lieder, Messiaen’s Poemes pour Mi, as well as works by Rachmaninoff, Strauss and Karnavičius).

=== Performances ===
Festivals
Year	Role	Festival	Venue	Location	Ref.
	Abigaile	Savonlinna Opera Festival			
	Abigaile	Verdianaeum		La Roncole	
		Bratislava Cantans			
	Agathe	Heilbronn Festival		Germany	
		Glamorgan Valley			
		Norrtelje Chamber Music festival			
	Aida	Holland Opera Festival			
	Abigaile	Opera Festival in Arles		France	

Operas
Year	Work	Composer	Role	Company	Venue	Location	Ref.
	Nabucco	Verdi	Abigaile		Estonia Theatre	Tallinn	
	Aida	Verdi	Aida		Estonia Theatre	Tallinn	
	Macbeth	Verdi	Lady Macbeth		Estonia Theatre	Tallinn	
	La traviata	Verdi	Violetta	Lithuanian Opera Company of Chicago			
	Aida		Aida			Taiwan	
	Nabucco	Verdi	Abigaile			England	
			Zerlina			England	
	Salome	Strauss	Salome			Tel Aviv	
				Latvian National Opera		France (tour)	
	Eugene Onegin	Tchaikovsky	Tatyana				
	Il trovatore	Verdi	Leonora				
	Gražina	Karnavičius	Ramunė				
	Faust	Gounod	Marguerite				
	Le nozze di Figaro	Mozart	Cherubino				
	La cambiale di matrimonio	Rossini	Fanny				
	Tannhäuser	Wagner	Elisabeth				
	Fidelio	Beethoven	Marcellina				
	Der Freischütz	Weber	Agathe				
	Tosca	Puccini	Tosca				
	The Tales of Hoffmann	Offenbach	Antonia				
	Suor Angelica	Puccini	Sister Angelica				
	The Queen of Spades	Tchaikovsky	Liza				
	The Flying Dutchman	Wagner	Senta				
	Un ballo in maschera	Verdi	Amelia				
	Turandot	Puccini	Liu				
	La forza del destino	Verdi	Leonora				
	Le nozze di Figaro	Mozart	Countess Almaviva				
	Eugene Onegin	Tchaikovsky	Larina				
	Otello	Verdi	Desdemona				
	Ernani	Verdi	Elvira				

Other performances
Year	Performance	With	Venue	Location	Ref.
		National Symphony Orchestra of the USA	J. F. Kennedy Center	Washington D.C.	
		Moscow Philharmonic			
		Odense Symphony			
		Lithuanian State Orchestra			
		National Symphony Orchestra			
		Estonian Symphony Orchestra			
		Latvian Symphony Orchestra			
		Lithuanian Chamber Orchestra			

== Teaching ==
In 1992, Stonytė started teaching at the Lithuanian Academy of Music and Theatre where she continues to be a Professor, as well as teaching classes abroad. She has also been a judge in local and international singing competitions.

== Awards ==
Year	Prize	For role	Awarding body	Location	Ref.
1984	Winner		International Competition for Singers	Riga	
1991	Second Prize (first prize not awarded)		International Marian Anderson Vocal Arts Competition	Maryland	
1996	Kristoforas Award	Lady Macbeth in Verdi's Macbeth	Lithuanian Theatre Union		
1999	Kipras Prize – Singer of the Year		Society of Lithuanian Opera Friends		
2000	The Knight's Cross		Order of the Lithuanian Grand Duke Gediminas		
2003	Special Prize	Amelia in Verdi's Un ballo in maschera and Zerlina in Mozart's Don Giovanni	Lithuanian Ministry of Culture		
2004	4th class Order of the Cross of Terra Mariana				
2004	Lithuanian National Prize				
2005	Operos Švyturiai (Opera Beacon Award) – Best Female Soloist of the Year	Leonora in La forza del destino and Senta in The Flying Dutchman	Lithuanian National Opera and Ballet Theatre		
2011	Golden Cross of the Stage	Countess Rosina Almaviva in Mozart's The Marriage of Figaro	Lithuanian Theatre Union		
2011	Opera Beacon Award – Best Female Soloist of the Year	Desdemona in Otello directed by Eimuntas Nekrošius	Lithuanian National Opera and Ballet Theatre		
2016	Golden Cross of the Stage Award – Lifetime Achievements to Lithuanian theatre		Lithuanian Theatre Union		

== Personal life ==
Stonytė is married to a Lithuanian pianist Jurgis Karnavičius.
