= Antanina Dambrauskaitė =

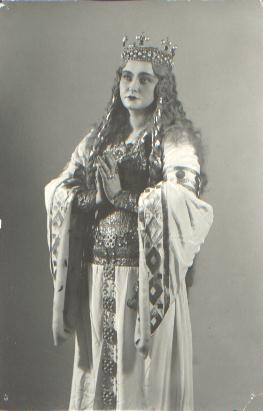
- Dambrauskaitė dressed for her role in Lohengrin in 1930s
- Born: 7 March 1905; Šiauliai, Russian Empire
- Died: 18 May 1994 (aged 89); Miami, Florida
- Burial place: Petrašiūnai Cemetery
- Education: Klaipėda Music School; Kaunas Music School
- Musical career
- Genres: Opera
- Occupation: Soprano
- Years active: 1929–1944, 1947–1949
- Formerly of: Klaipėda Lithuanian Opera, Lithuanian National Opera

Antanina Dambrauskaitė (7 March 1905 – 18 May 1994) was a Lithuanian soprano that performed across Europe and North America.

== Education ==
Dambrauskaitė studied music and singing at Klaipėda Music School (1925–1929) and Kaunas Music School (1929–1930). She studied under Marijana Čerkaskaja and Vladislava Grigaitienė. Later, in 1933, she continued her studies at St. Cecilia Academy of Music in Rome.

== Career ==
She began her career at the Klaipėda Lithuanian Opera playing Birutė in Birutė and Margarita in Faust.

In 1929, Dambrauskaitė became the prima donna of the Lithuanian National Opera. She performed at the national opera from 1929 to 1944. She performed for radio concerts in Prague, Vienna, Budapest, Liepāja, Munich, Riga, and Tallinn.

At the end of World War II, Dambrauskaitė performed in Lithuanian refugee camps in Germany. She performed lead roles in Madama Butterfly and The Bartered Bride and at the Staatstheater Augsburg.

In 1949, Dambrauskaitė performed across England with other Lithuanian singers – Alė Kalvaitytė, Stasys Baranauskas-Baras, Ippolito Nauragis, and Vladas Jakubėnas.

After 1949, Dambrauskaitė moved to Miami, Florida.

== Notable performances ==
Year	Work	Role	Composer	Source
	Don Juan	Dona Elvira	Wolfgang Amadeus Mozart	
	Otello	Desdemona	Giuseppe Verdi	
	Faust	Margarita	Charles Gounod	
	Tannhäuser	Elizabeth	Richard Wagner	
	Eugene Onegin	Tatiana	Pyotr Ilyich Tchaikovsky	
1947	Madame Butterfly	Chio Chio San	Giacomo Puccini	
	La Bohème	Mimi	Giacomo Puccini	
1947	The Bartered Bride	Marženka	Bedřich Smetana	
	Demonas	Tamara	Anton Rubinstein	
	Radvila Perkūnas	Sophia	J. Karnavičius	
	Eglė	Spruce	Mikas Petrauskas, Jonas Dambrauskas	
	Pagirėnai	Danute	Stasys Šimkus	

== Discography ==
Title	Year	Details
Neklausk Manęs / Meilės Ilgesys	1935	Format: EP, Shellac; Tracks: 2; Label: Homocord; Lyrics: Vytautas Pranas Bičiūnas; Composer: Jerzy Petersburski, Feofania Markowna Kwiatkowska; Music Accompaniment: Homocord Orchester
Rūtų Darželis / Jau Niekad	1935	Format: EP, Shellac; Tracks: 2; Label: Homocord; Lyrics: Vytautas Pranas Bičiūnas; Composer: Jerzy Petersburski, Feofania Markowna Kwiatkowska; Music Accompaniment: Homocord Orchester
Tėvynės Meilė Nemari (Love For My Country)	1965	Format: LP; Tracks: 13; Producer: Jack J. Stukas; Label: Eurotone, Sparton; Featured Performer(s): Petras Steponavičius; Music Accompaniment: Marija Tallat-Kelpsiene
Neklausk Manęs	1993	Format: Song; Album: 1935 Metai Lietuva; Editor: Donatas Katkus; Music Accompaniment: Mahanojaus Lietuviška Mainerių Orkestra
Ilgesys	1993	Format: Song; Album: 1935 Metai Lietuva; Editor: Donatas Katkus; Music Accompaniment: Mahanojaus Lietuviška Mainerių Orkestra
Rūtų Darželis	1993	Format: Song; Album: 1935 Metai Lietuva; Editor: Donatas Katkus; Music Accompaniment: Mahanojaus Lietuviška Mainerių Orkestra
Jau Niekad	1993	Format: Song; Album: 1935 Metai Lietuva; Editor: Donatas Katkus; Music Accompaniment: Mahanojaus Lietuviška Mainerių Orkestra
Neklausk Manęs	2006	Format: Song; Album: Visų Laikų Lietuvos Radijo Dainos 1926-2006; Label: Lithuanian National Radio and Television; Compiler: Alicija Žukauskaitė; Editor: Mindaugas Rastenis
Kai Jau Kristus Gimė	2007	Format: Song; Album: Senųjų Lietuviškų Šelako Plokštelių Antologija (Anthology Of Old Lithuanian Shellac Records); Label: Martynas Mažvydas National Library of Lithuania
Marija, Marija	2007	Format: Song; Album: Senųjų Lietuviškų Šelako Plokštelių Antologija (Anthology Of Old Lithuanian Shellac Records); Label: Martynas Mažvydas National Library of Lithuania
