= Grazina =

Grazina may refer to:

- Gražina name, a Lithuanian feminine given name
- Grazina Frame, (born 1941) English singer and actress

== See also ==
- Grażyna, a Polish feminine given name
