= Grażyna =

Polish female name created by Adam Mickiewicz

Grażyna [ɡraˈʐɨna] is a Polish feminine given name. The name was created by the Polish poet Adam Mickiewicz for the main character of his 1823 poem Grażyna. The name is derived from the Lithuanian adjective gražus, meaning "pretty", "beautiful".

Diminutives/hypocoristics include Grasia, Grazia, Grażynka, Grażka, Grażusia.

In Polish tradition, the name days for Grażyna are April 1 and July 26.

== Notable people ==
- Grażyna Auguścik (born 1955), Polish jazz vocalist, composer, and arranger
- Grażyna Bacewicz (1909–1969), Polish composer and violinist
- Grażyna Błęcka-Kolska (born 1962), Polish actress
- Grażyna Brodzińska (born 1951), Polish soprano, opera and operetta singer, and musical actress
- Grażyna Ciemniak (born 1948), Polish politician
- Grażyna Długołęcka (born 1951), Polish film actress
- Grażyna Gęsicka (1951–2010), Polish sociologist and politician
- Grazyna Kochanska, Polish-American developmental psychologist
- Grażyna Kostrzewińska (born 1950), Polish pair skater
- Grażyna Kulczyk (born 1950), Polish investor, art collector, philanthropist and billionaire
- Grazyna Monvid, British actress, author and award-winning playwright
- Grażyna Miller (1957–2009), Polish poet and translator
- Grażyna Prokopek (born 1977), Polish sprinter
- Grażyna Pstrokońska-Nawratil (born 1947), Polish composer and music educator
- Grażyna Szapołowska (born 1953), Polish film and theatre actress
- Grażyna Staszak-Makowska (born 1953), Polish fencer
- Grażyna Strachota (born 1960), Polish actress
- Grażyna Rabsztyn (born 1952), Polish hurdler
- Grażyna Witkowska (born 1952), Polish gymnast
- Grażyna Wolszczak (born 1958), Polish actress
- Grażyna Vetulani (born 1956), Polish philologist and linguist, professor of the humanities
- Wanda Grażyna Gałecka-Szmurło (1899–1993), Polish lawyer, independence and social activist, the second woman in Poland who was entered on the list of lawyers

== See also ==
- Gražina
