= Church of St. John the Baptist, Plungė =

Church in Plungė, Lithuania

Plungė St John the Baptist church
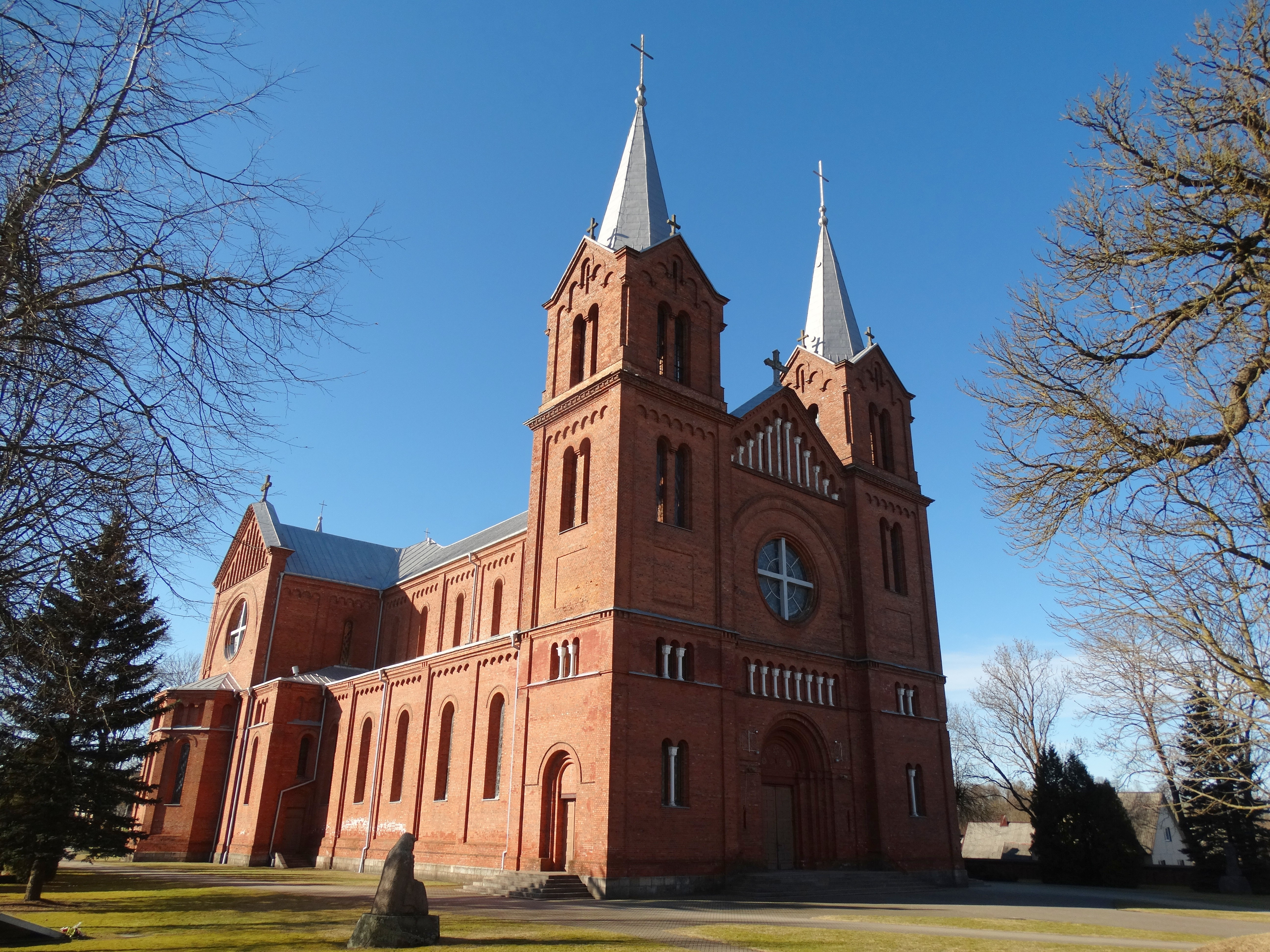
- Interactive map of the Plungė St John the Baptist church area

General information
- Location: Plungė, Lithuania
- Coordinates: 55.913738°N 21.838567°E

Website
- plungesparapija.lt

The St John the Baptist church buildings are the main cultural objects of Plungė Old Town. The church was built in the Romanesque revival style, with a Latin cross layout and two towers. The predecessor of the present-day church was the wooden 1797 St John the Baptist church, which did not survive to present times. The building of the new church began in 1899.

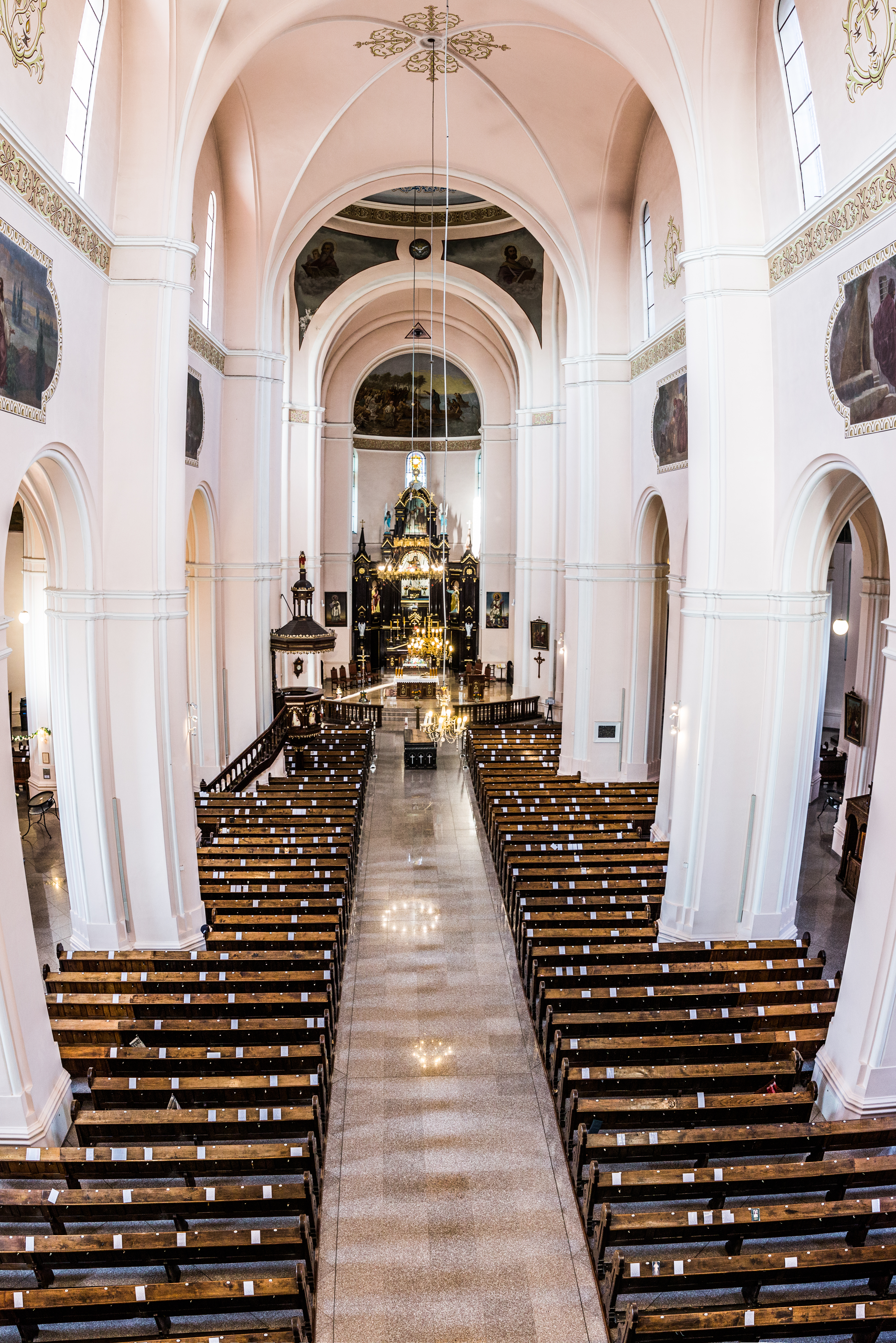

== History ==
In 1902, the building of the church stopped when Michał Mikołaj Ogiński, the sponsor of the church, died. The contributions of funds and building materials that had been gathered were insufficient to complete the building, and due to difficult socio-economic circumstances the collection of additional funds was unsuccessful.

The masonry of the St John the Baptist church was only completed in 1933, the year when it was consecrated by the Telšiai bishop, Justinas Staugaitis. Presently, the church and the bell tower belong to the Plungė St John the Baptist church building complex. The bell tower in a Classical style is bound to the fence of the sacred ground surrounding the church and is an inseparable part of the complex. However, the Lourdes replica with the sculpture of the Holy Virgin Mary was built at an earlier time, on the initiative of the wife of Mykolas Mikalojus Oginskis – Marija Skuževskė-Oginskienė. In 1903, she invited the Grey Ursulines (nuns of the Congregation of the Ursulines of the Agonising Heart of Jesus) and the leader of the congregation from Krakow to visit. When they decided to build the Lourdes replica here, the duke's wife donated 5000 roubles to the project. After two years, the nun Sofija Zakževska brought over the sculpture of the Holy Virgin Mary for the Lourdes site. During the Soviet era, the Plungė Lourdes replica was destroyed and the sculpture was partially damaged and thrown into the river. Nonetheless, the local residents rescued it and the Lourdes replica was rebuilt and consecrated in 1990. The old sculpture from the original Lourdes site has stayed in the Plungė church.

== Gallery ==
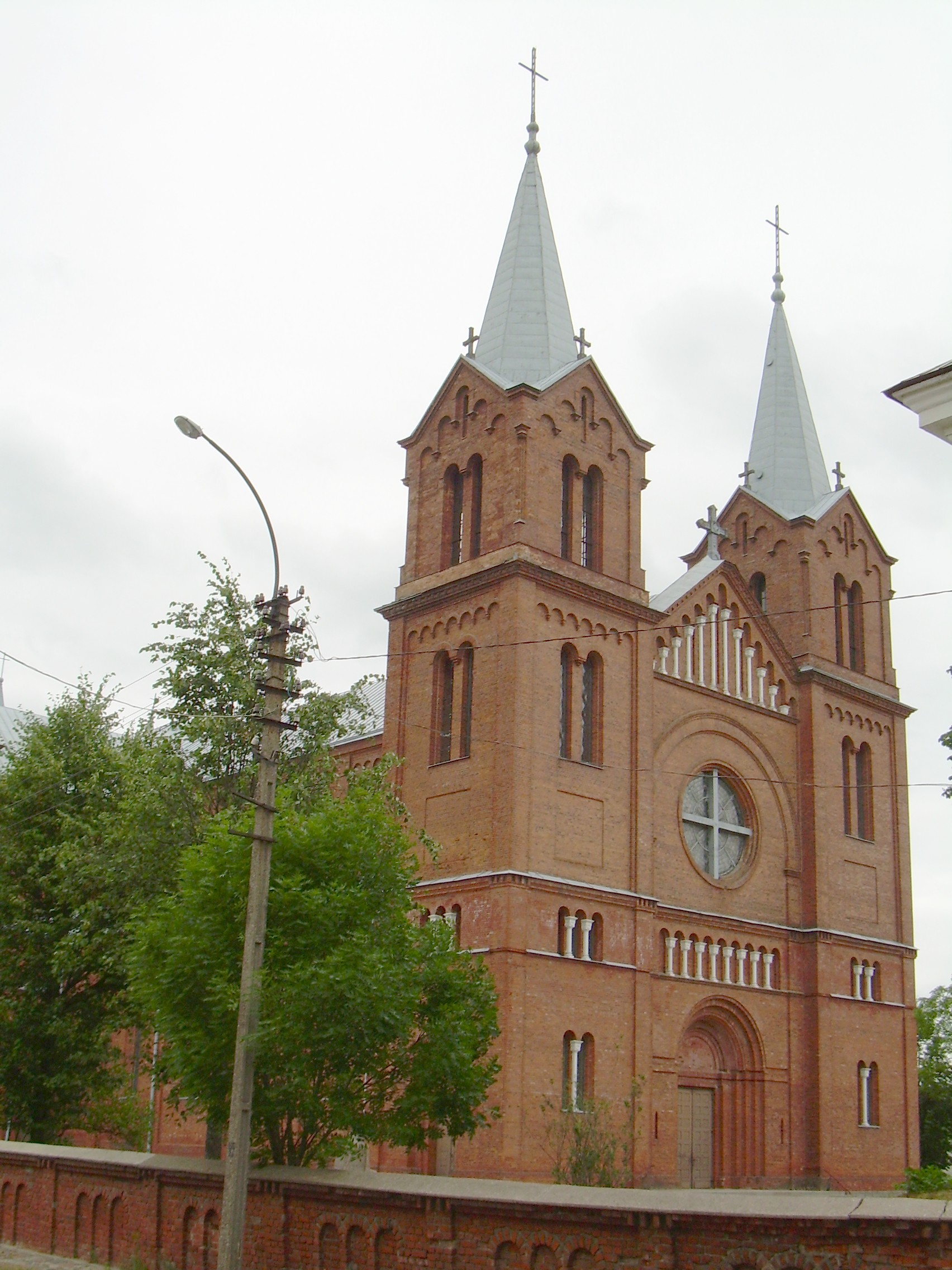

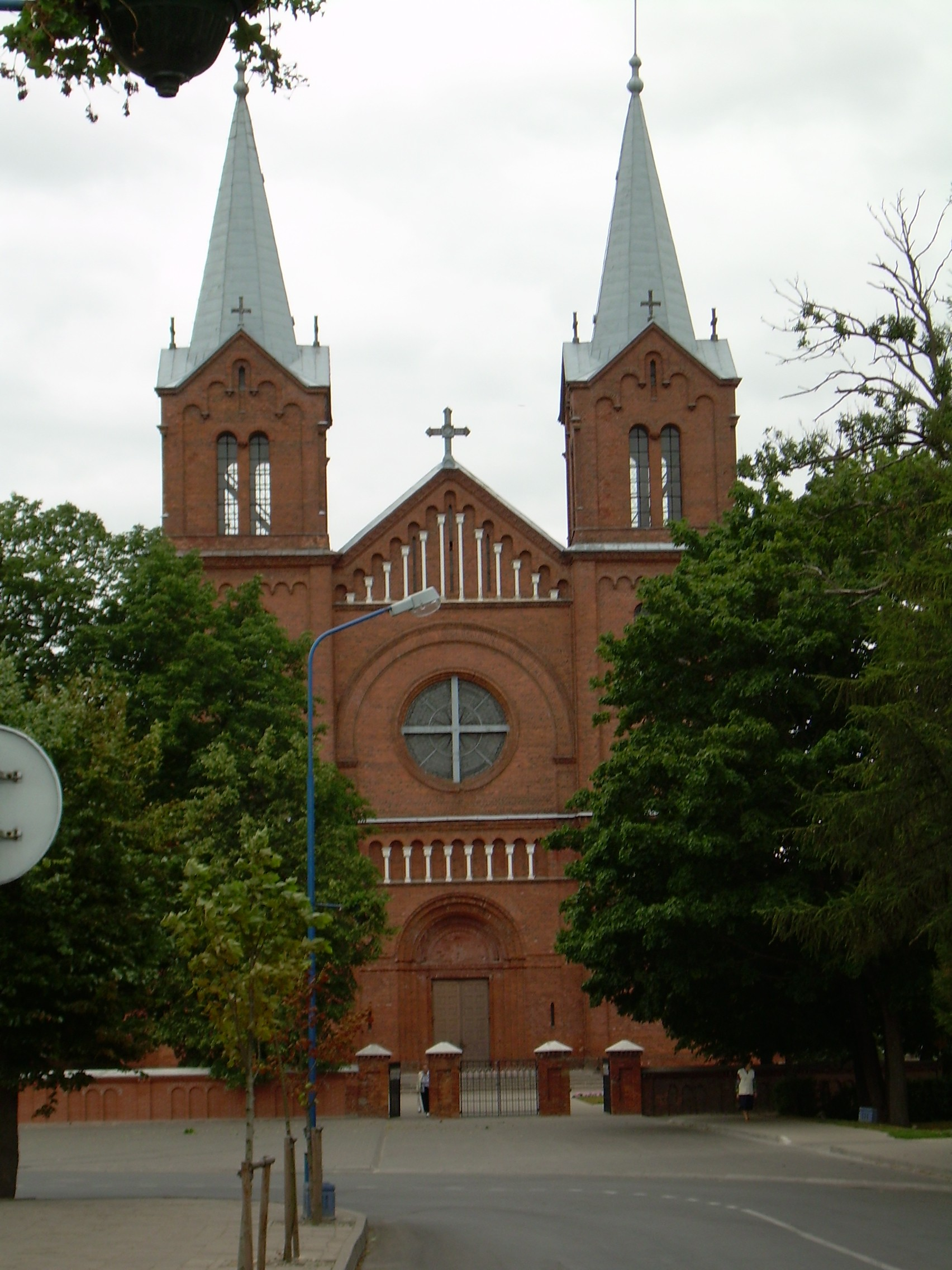

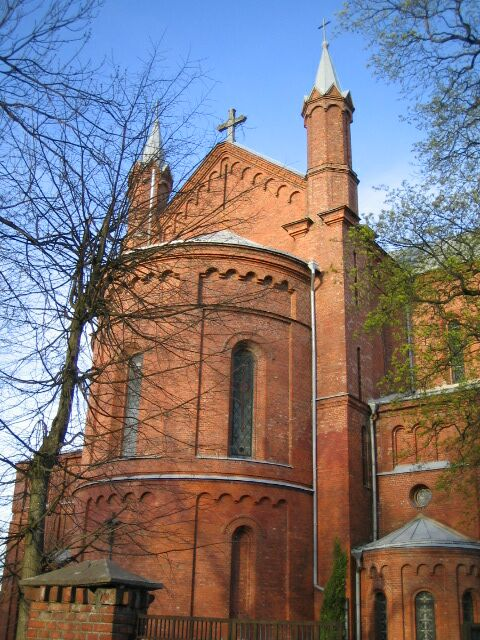

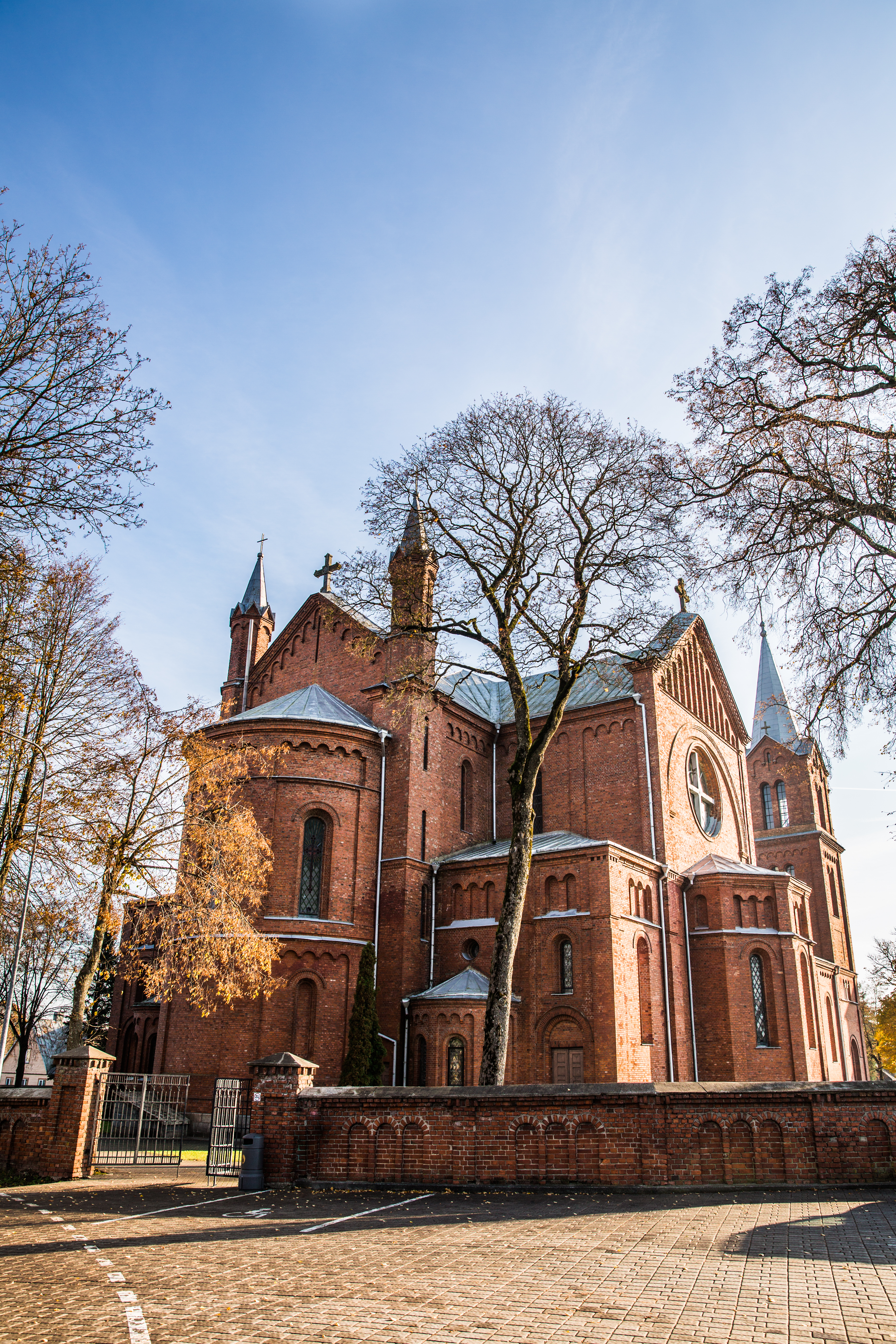

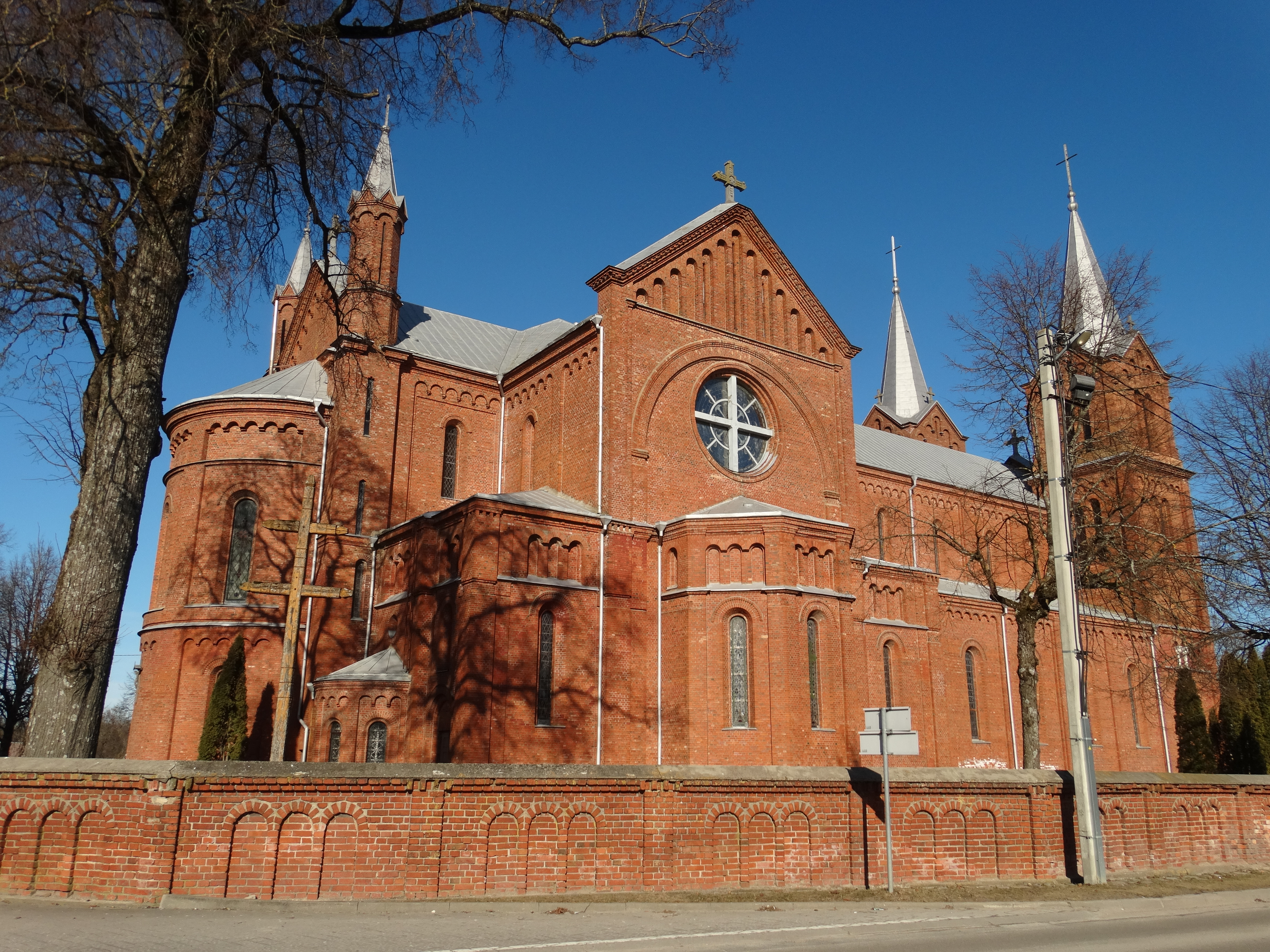

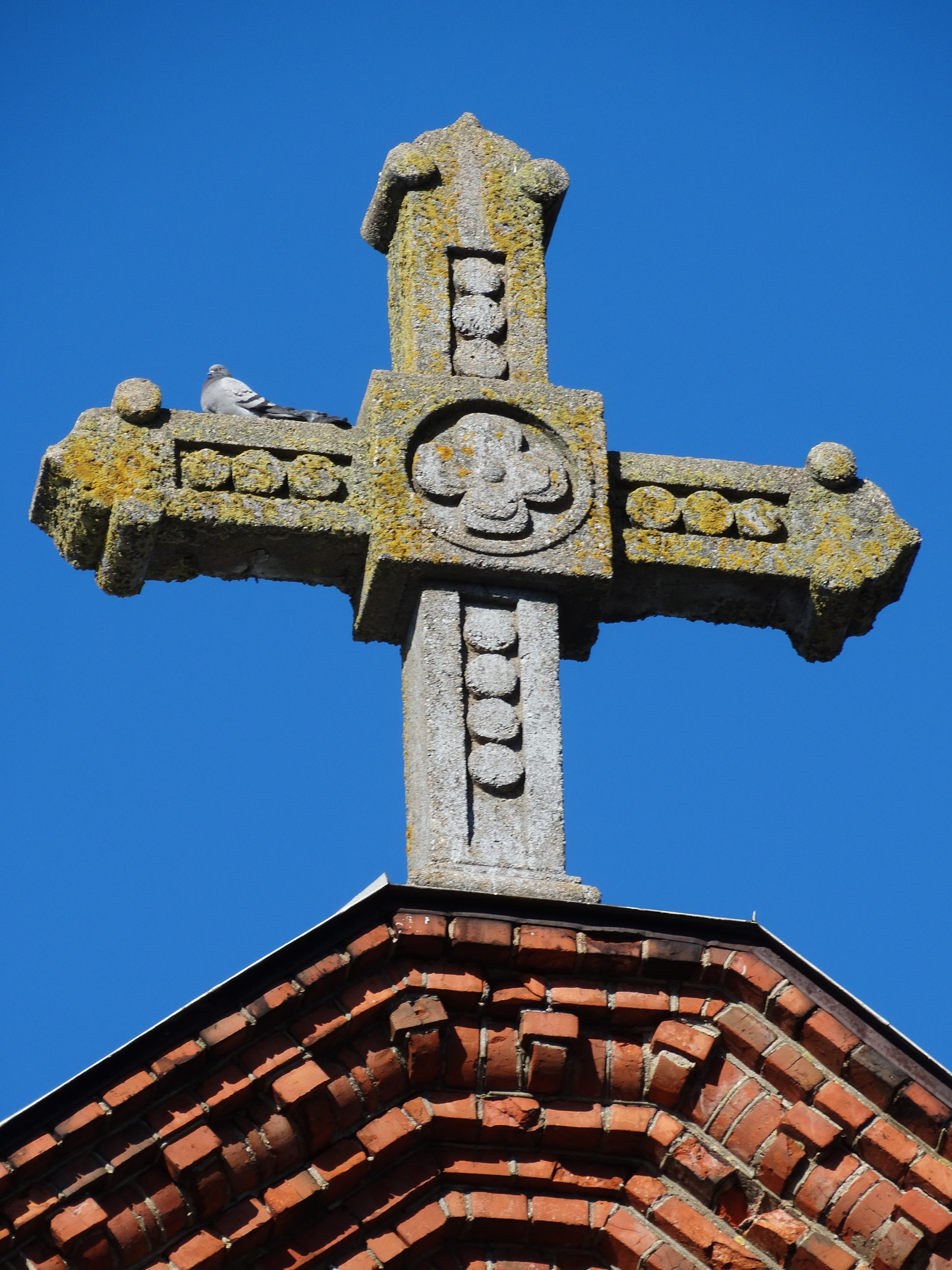

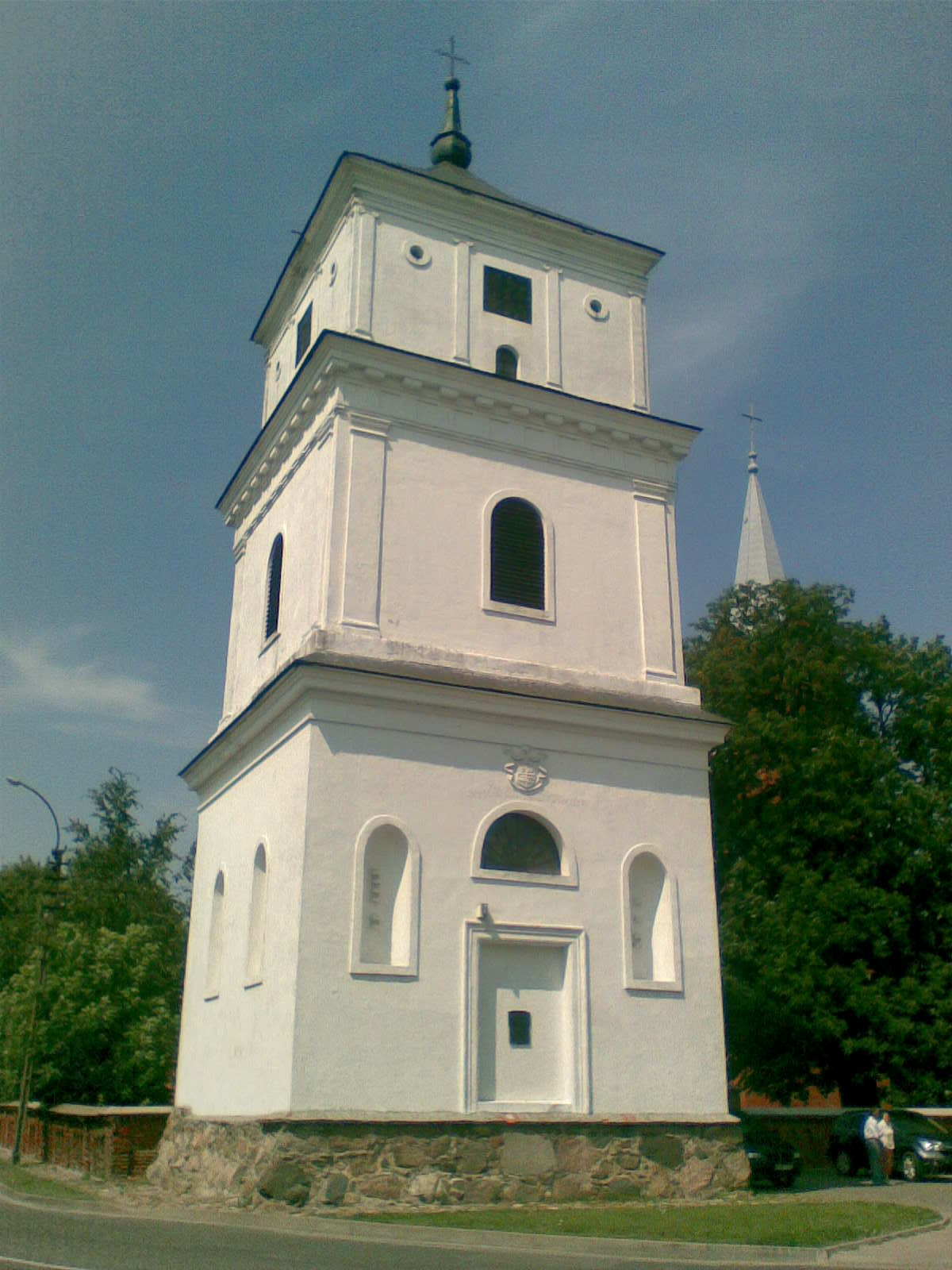

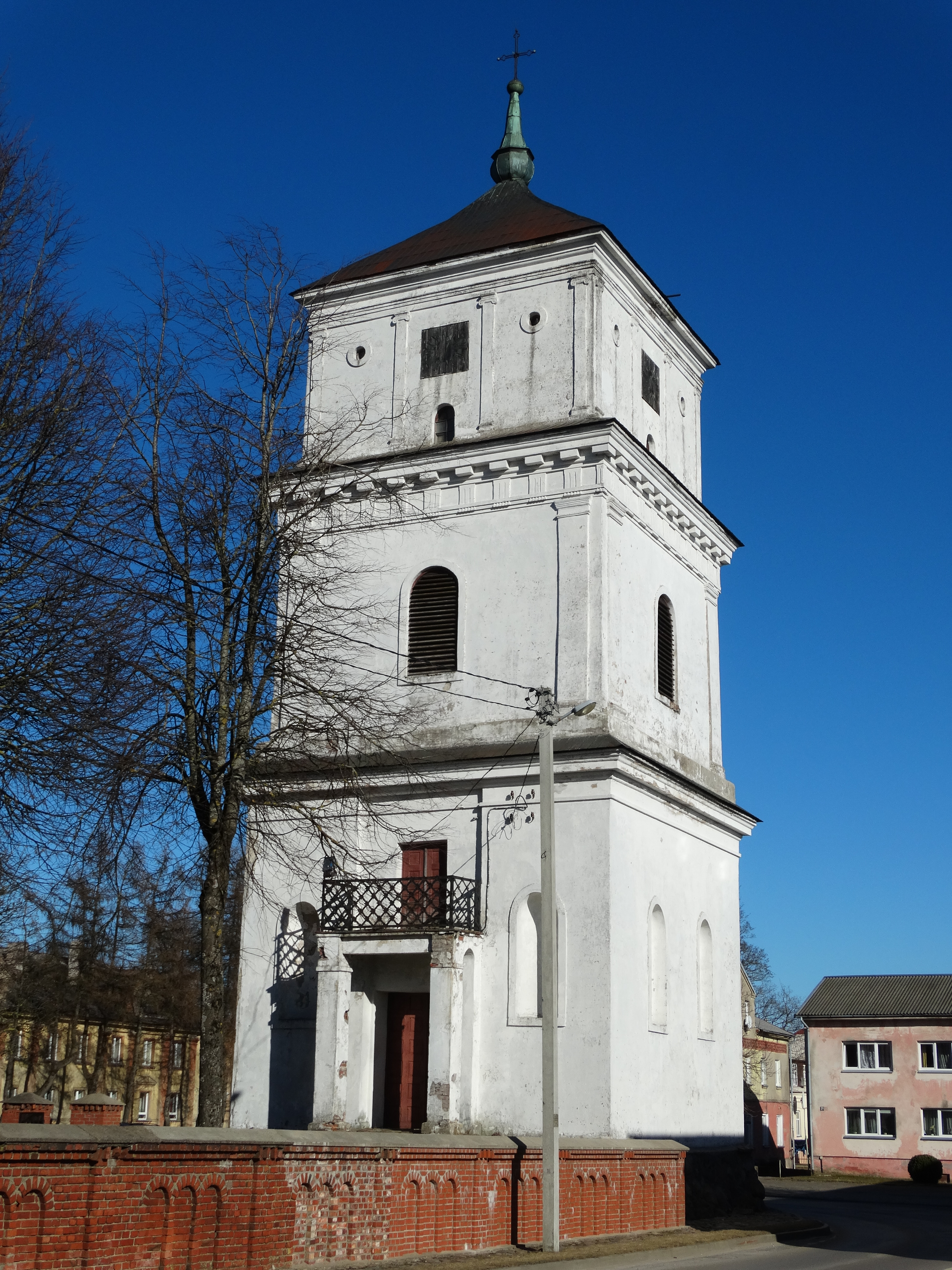

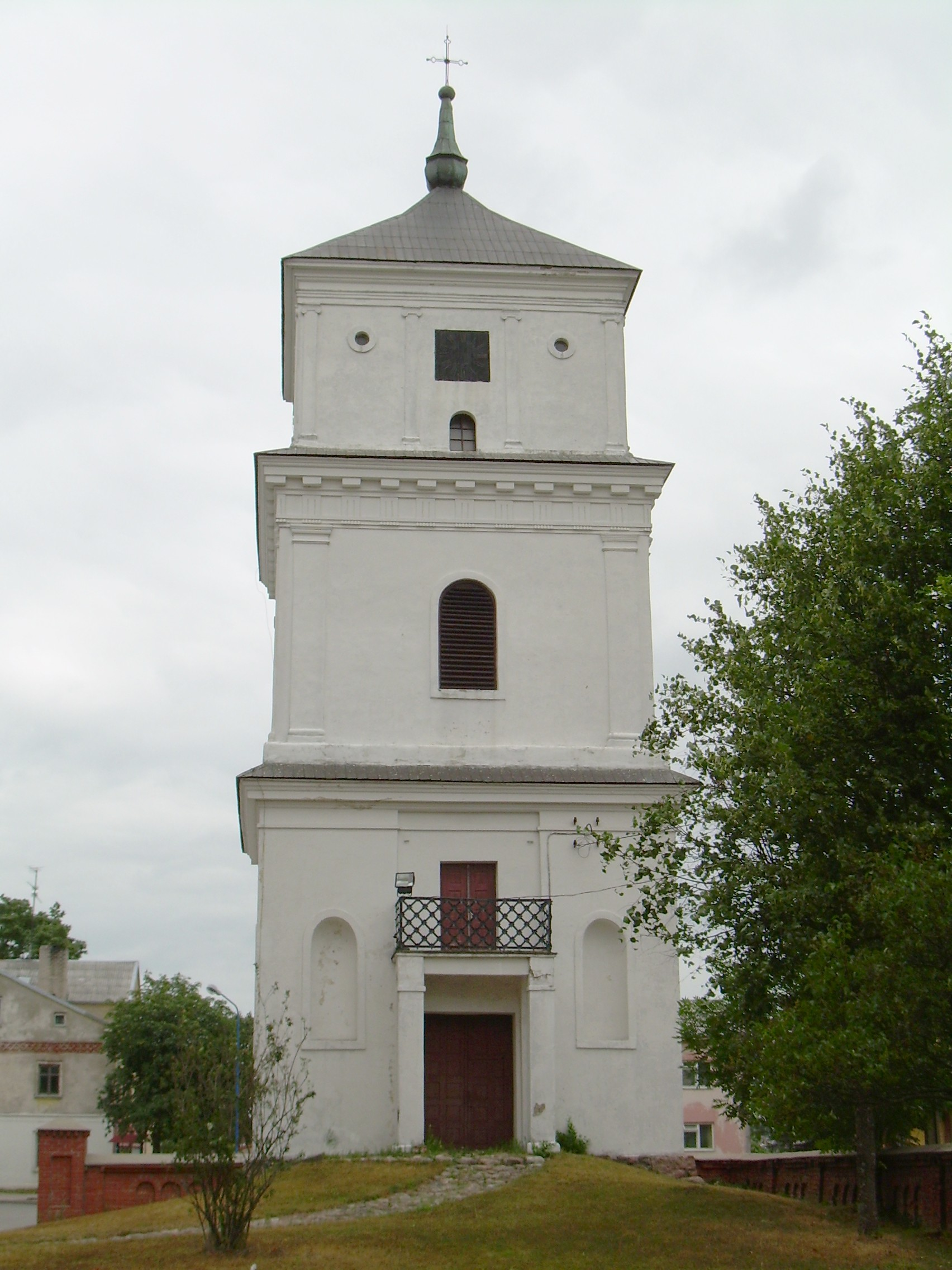

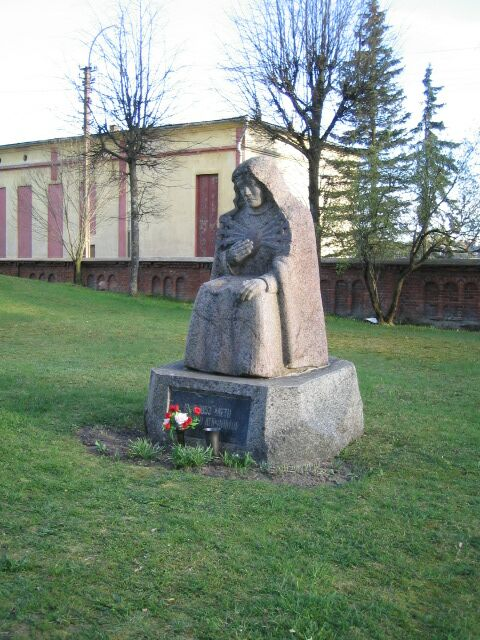

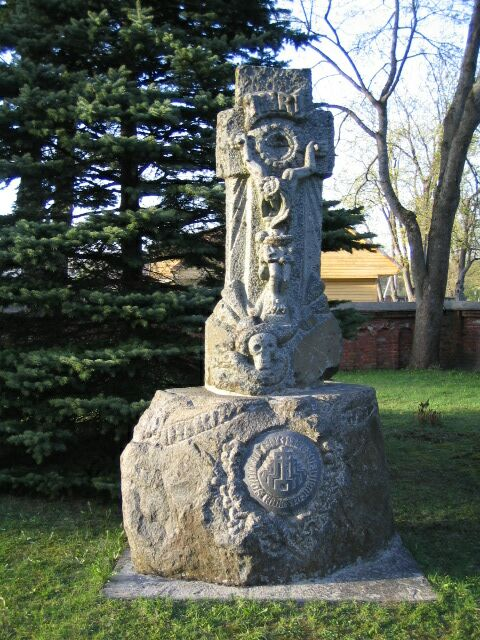

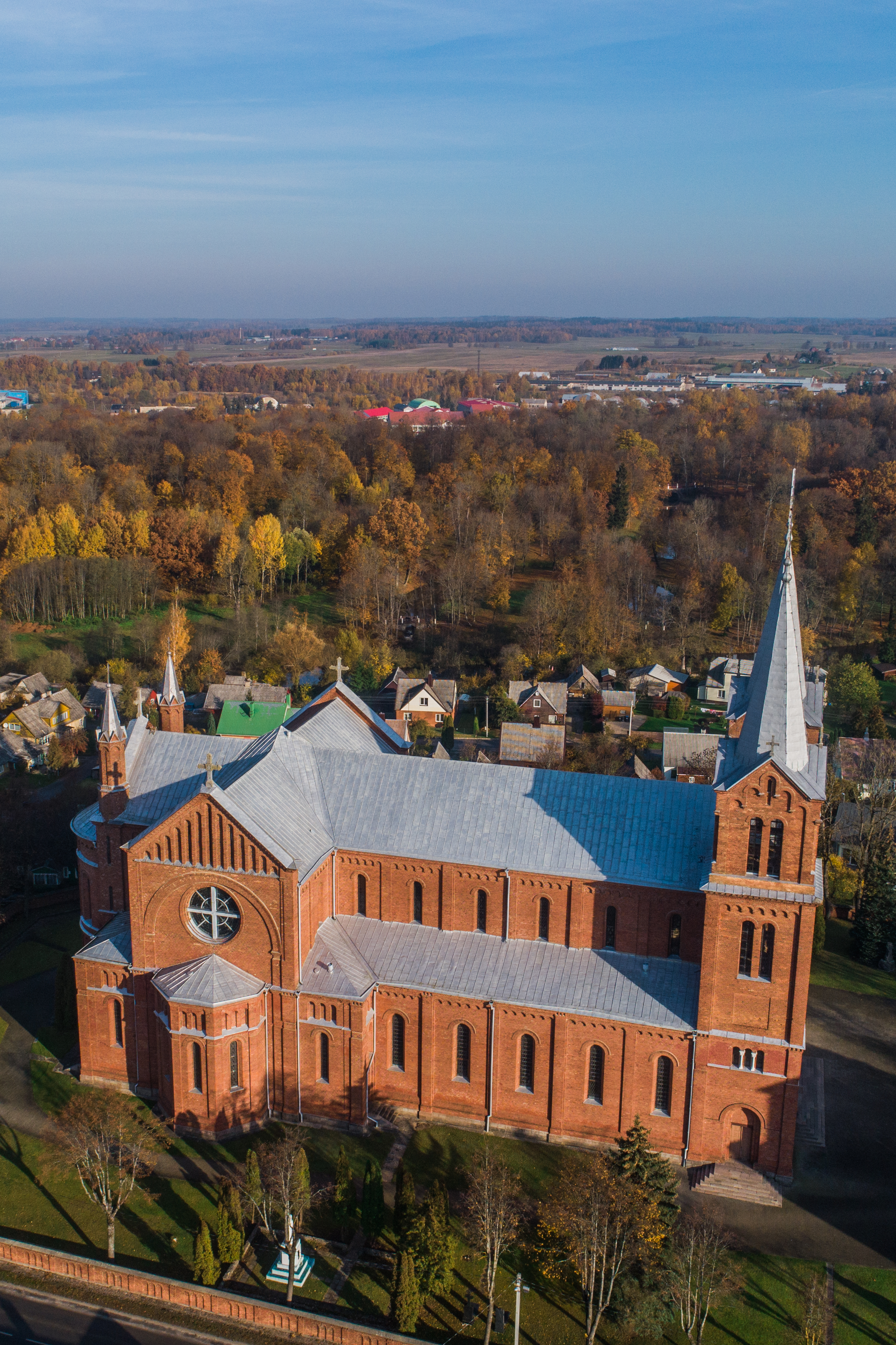

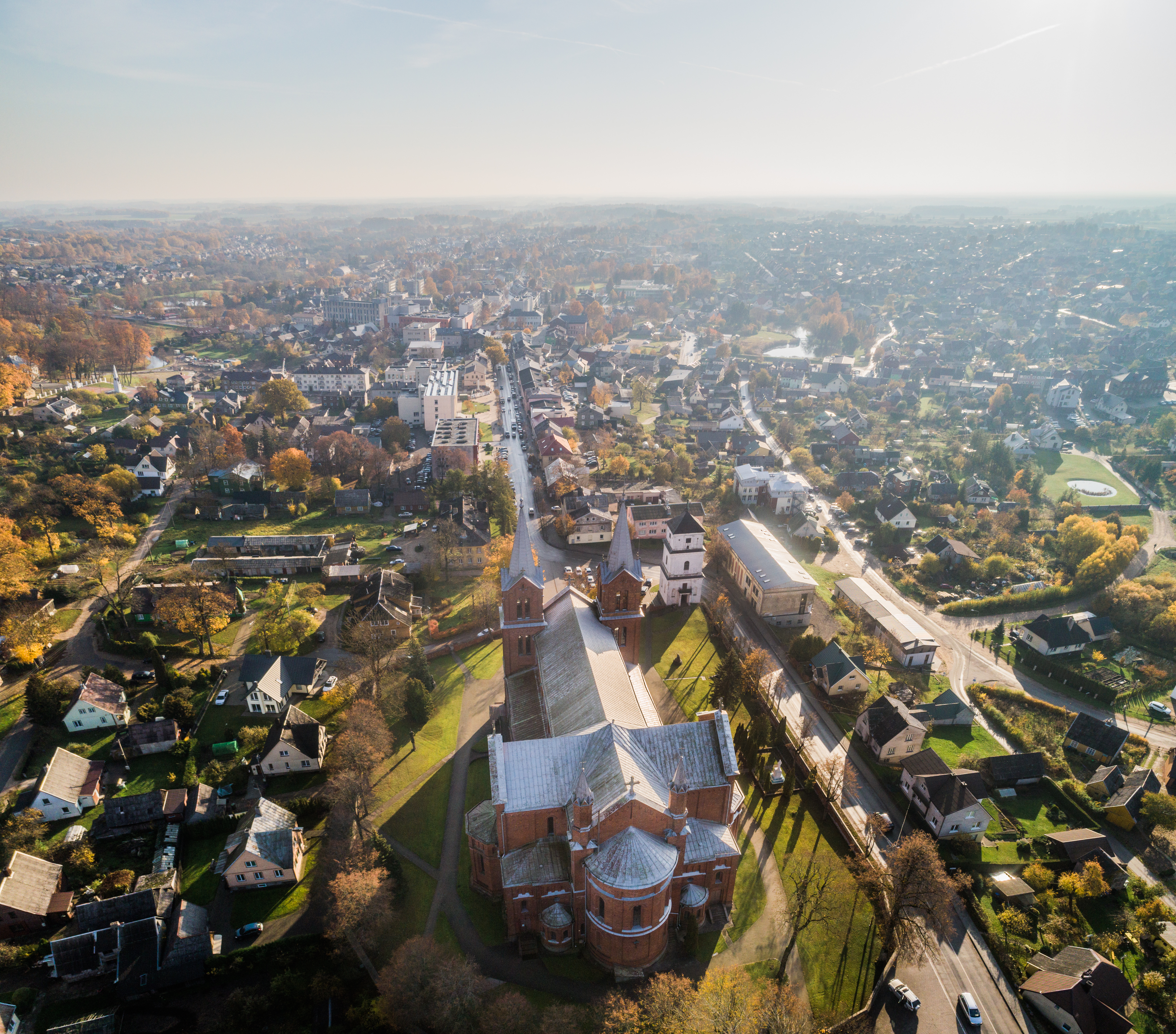

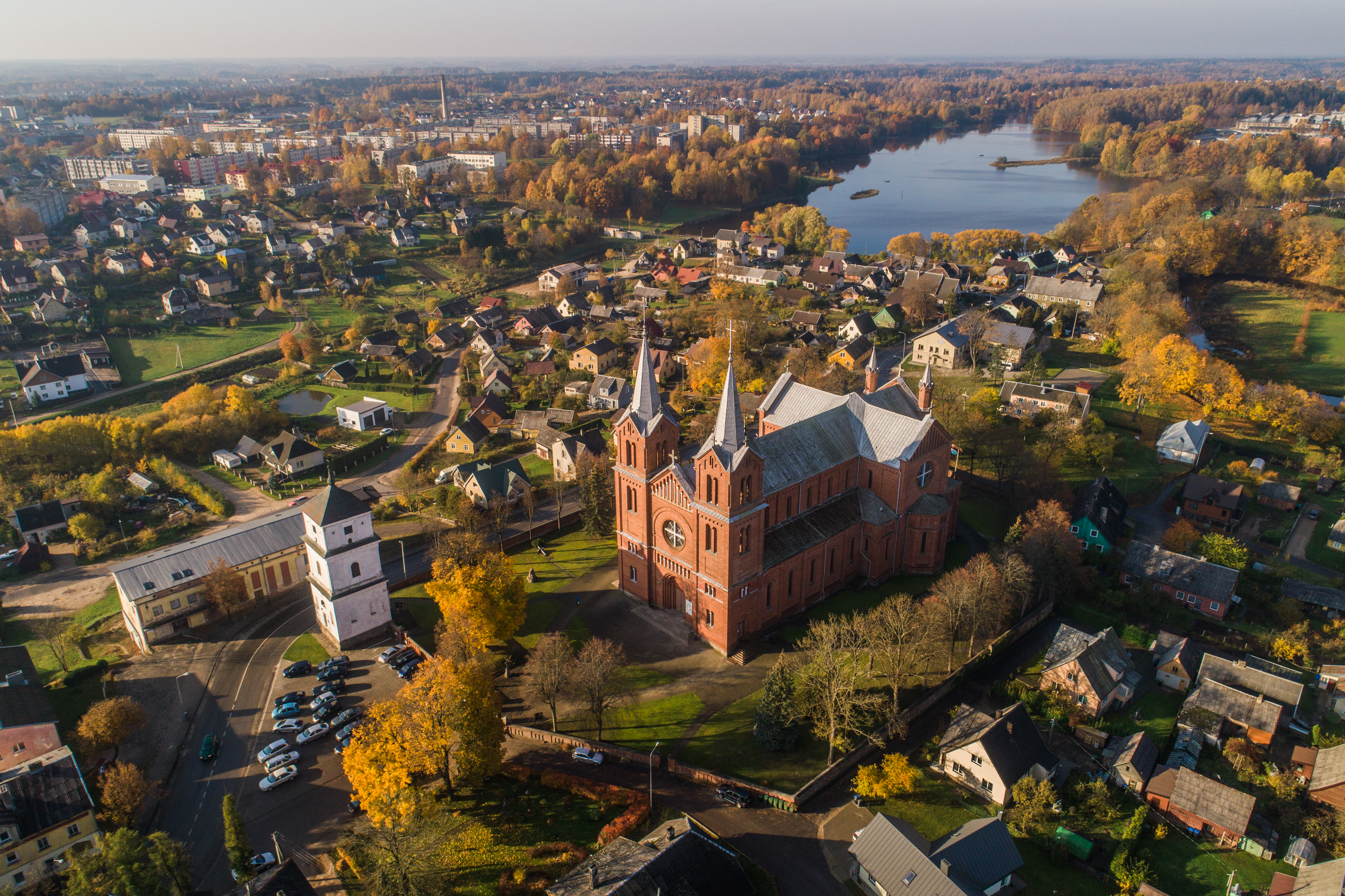

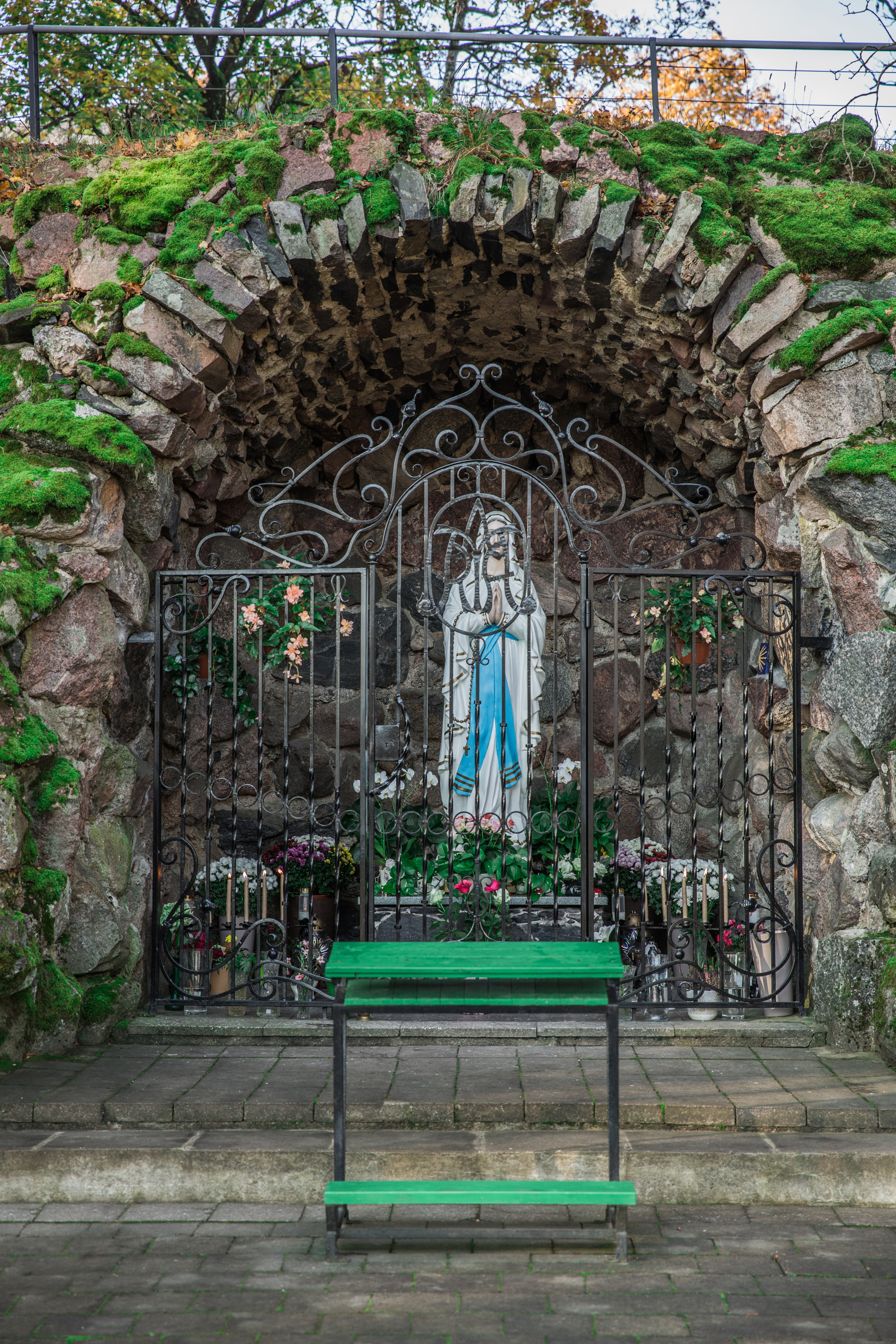
