= Władysław Niewiarowicz =

Polish painter (1814–1891)

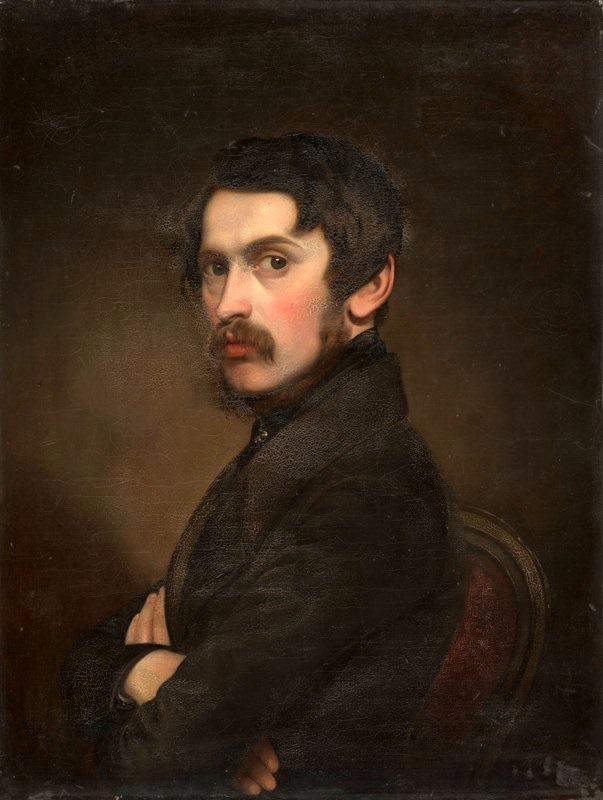
- Self-portrait, 1841
- Born: c. 1814 – c. 1815; Marcybieliški
- Died: January 16, 1891 (aged 75–76); Paris
- Other names: Jan Tysiewicz

Władysław Niewiarowicz (1814/1815 – 16 January 1891), also known as Jan Tysiewicz, was a Polish-French artist. Born in a village of Minsk Governorate, he studied art in Vilnius. After participation in a suppressed November Uprising of 1830–1831, he emigrated to Europe. His most known works are "Repentant Mary Magdalene" and illustrations to two poems by Adam Mickiewicz. He died in Paris in 1891; he bequeathed all his paintings and library to a foundation that supported young artists.

== Biography ==
Władysław Niewiarowicz was born in 1814 or 1815 in a village Marcybieliški, Minsk Governorate. Niewiarowicz started art studies in 1830 in Vilnius University; one of his teachers was Jonas Rustemas. Niewiarowicz participated in the November Uprising of 1830–1831; he emigrated when the uprising was suppressed. He lived several years in Lviv, then studied in Vienna Academy of Fine Arts under Frederick Ammerling, then studied in Rome. He took the pen name Jan Tysiewicz in 1840s.

His most famous work, "Repentant Mary Magdalene", was presented in Lviv in 1842. The painting was inspired by the painting of the same name by Jean Baptiste Lodewijk Maes. The painting was bought by writer Felix Boznansky, who toured Europe with it holding one-piece exhibitions in German, Polish, and Russian cities.

Niewiarowicz moved to Paris in 1843, and lived in a villa in Montmorency. His painting "Saint Peter" was exhibited in Paris in 1849, it was later bought by the French government and placed into the Saint Peter's Church of Cadilla.

Niewiarowicz made a number of portraits in a "Biedermeier-style", and said to be a master of portrait miniatures. In 1851 Niewiarowicz illustrated two poems by Adam Mickiewicz, Konrad Wallenrod and Grażyna, and funded the publication of the book in Polish, French, and English. A hundred wooden engravings were made by Polish and French masters according to Niewiarowicz's illustrations; he coloured several copies himself.

Niewiarowicz died on 16 January 1891 in Montmorency; all his paintings and library were bequeathed to Osolinski National Fund in Lviv to support young artists.

== Gallery ==
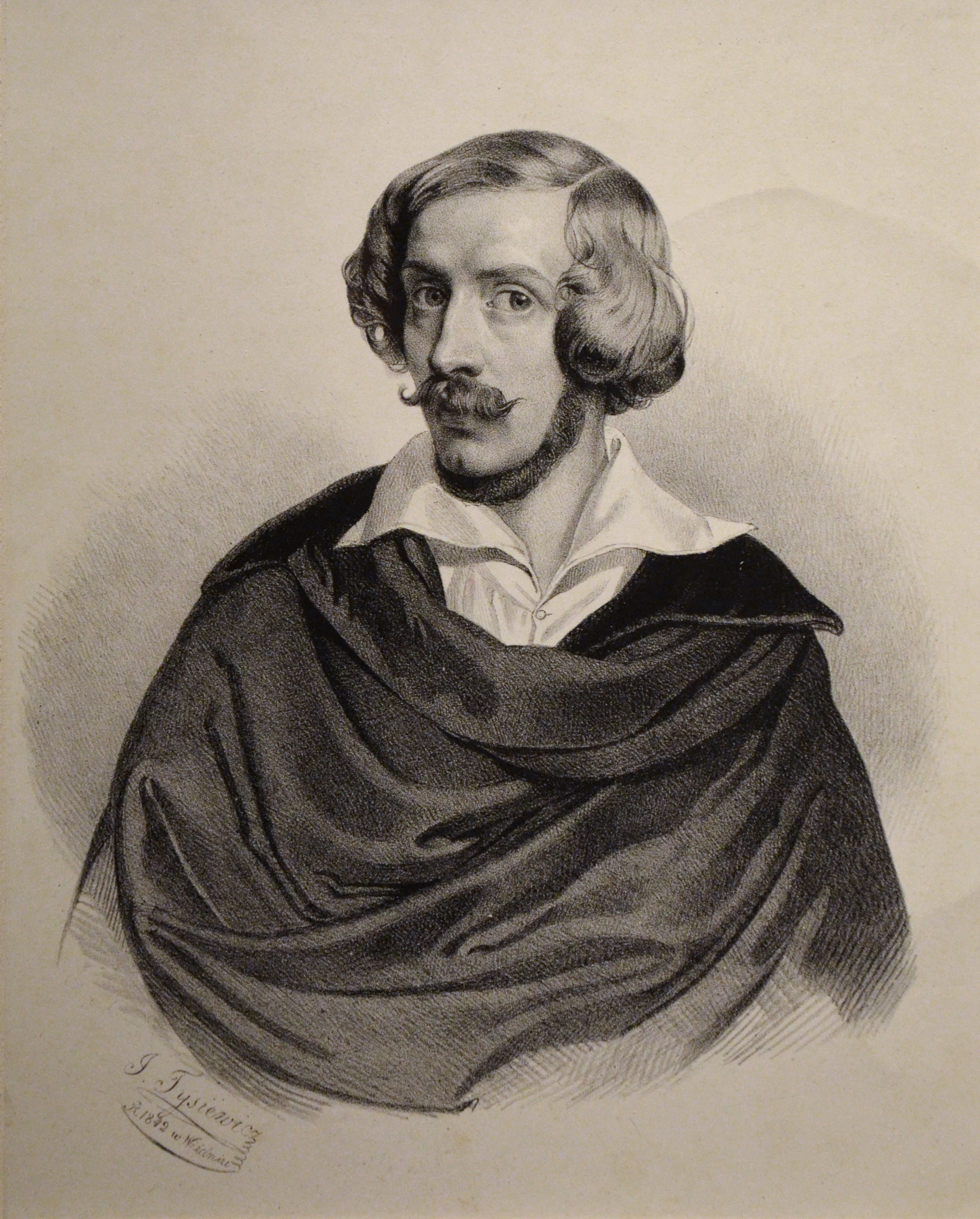
Self-portrait, 1842

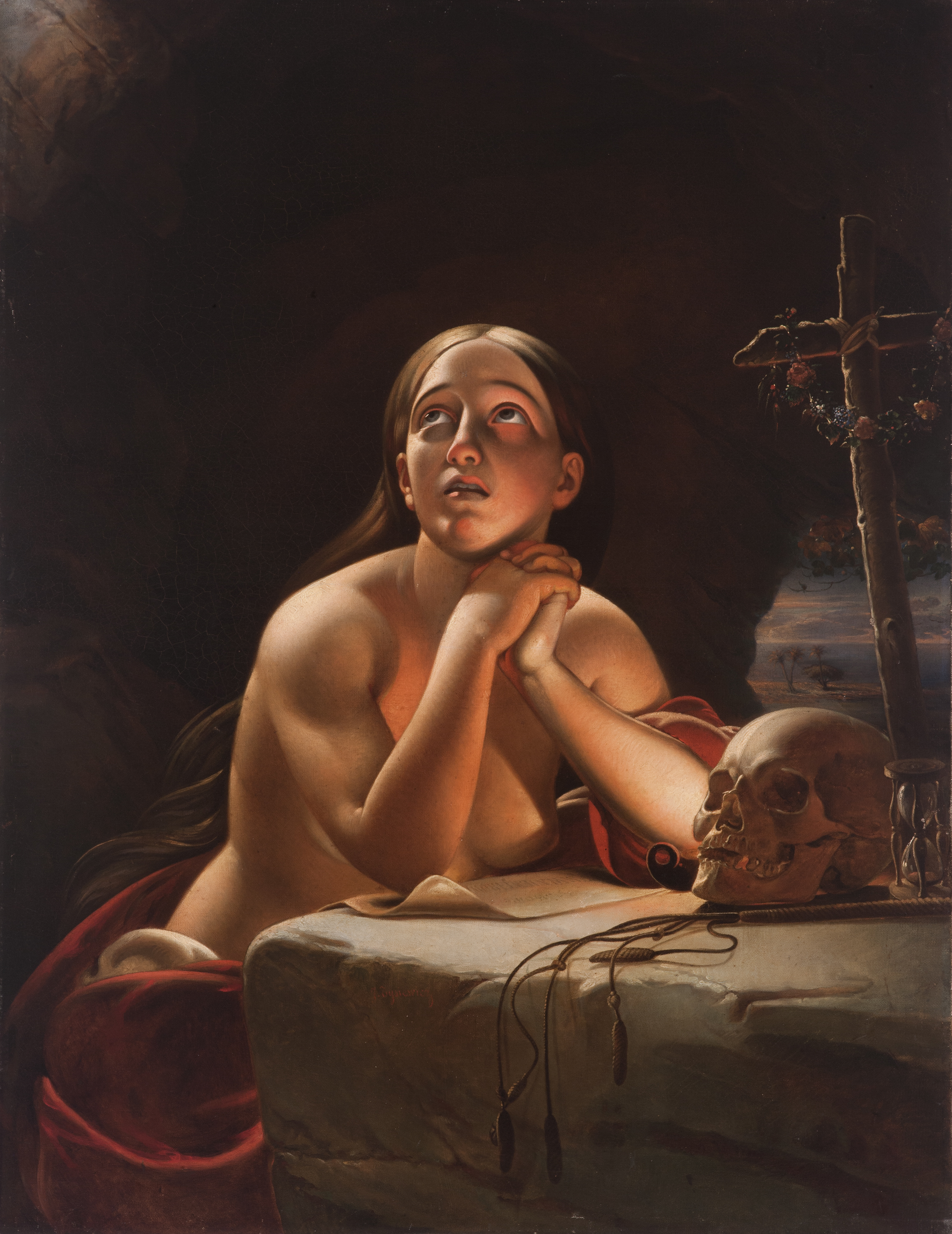
Repentant Mary Magdalene, 1842

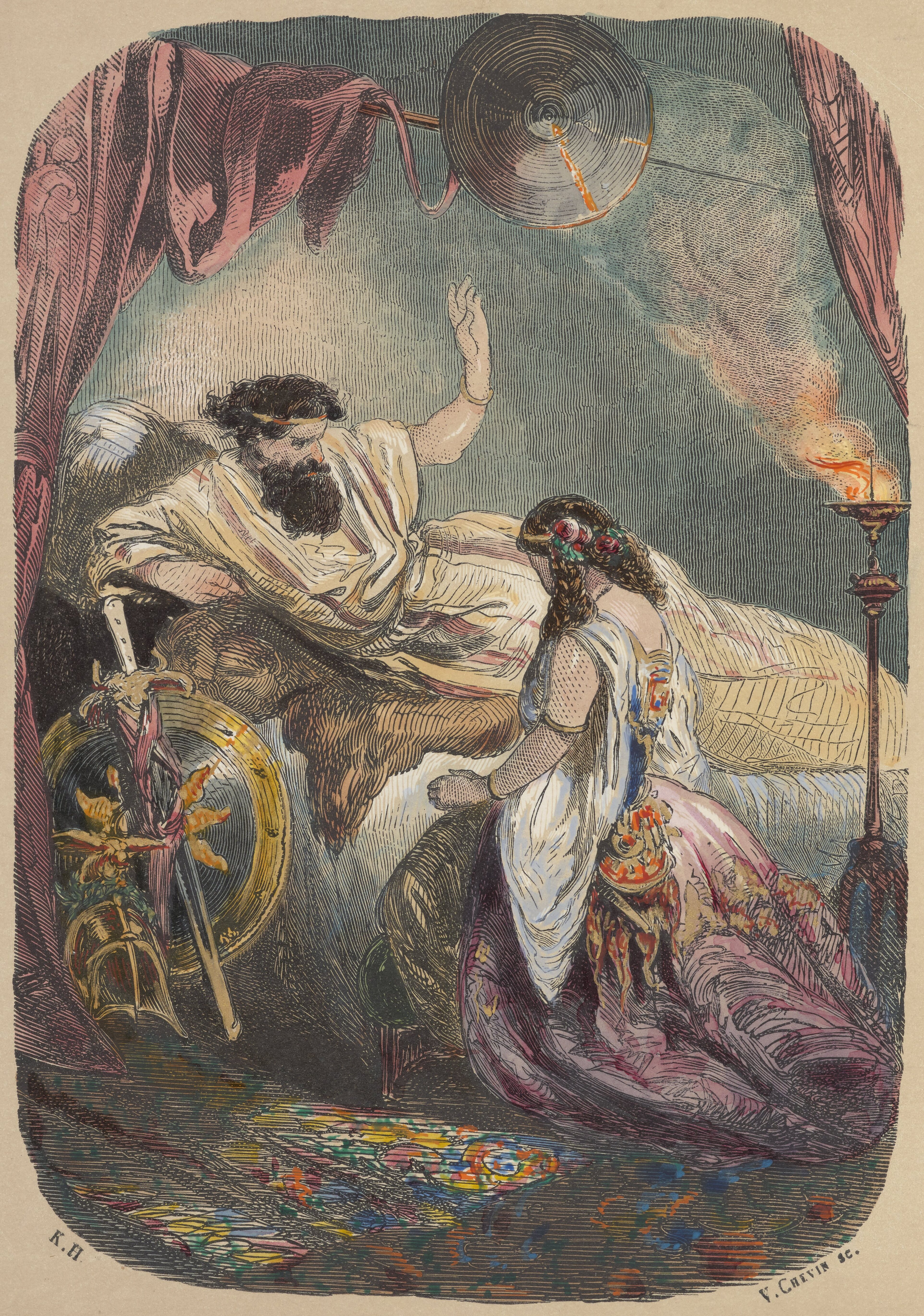
Illustration for Grażyna, 1851

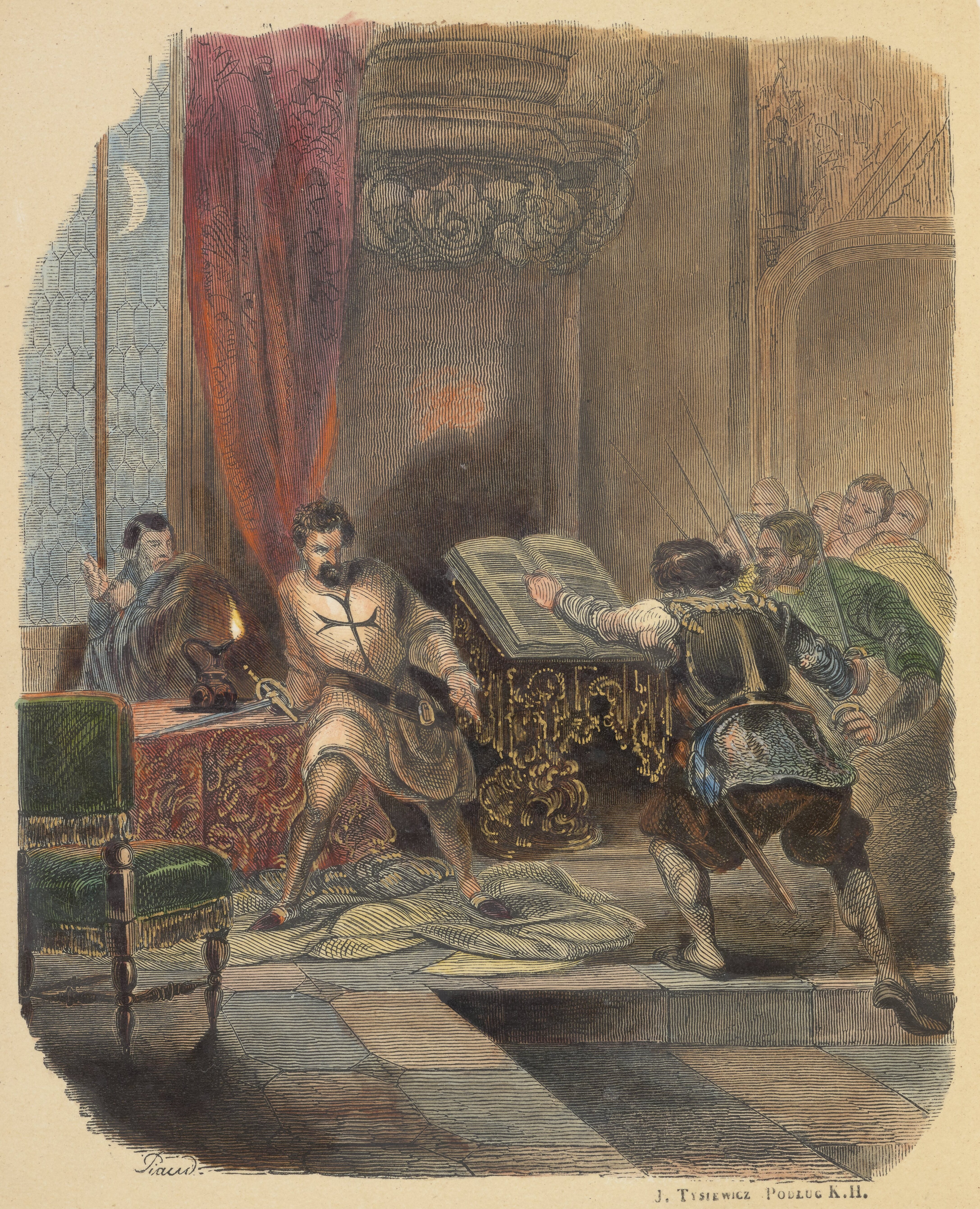
Illustration for Konrad Wallenrod, 1851

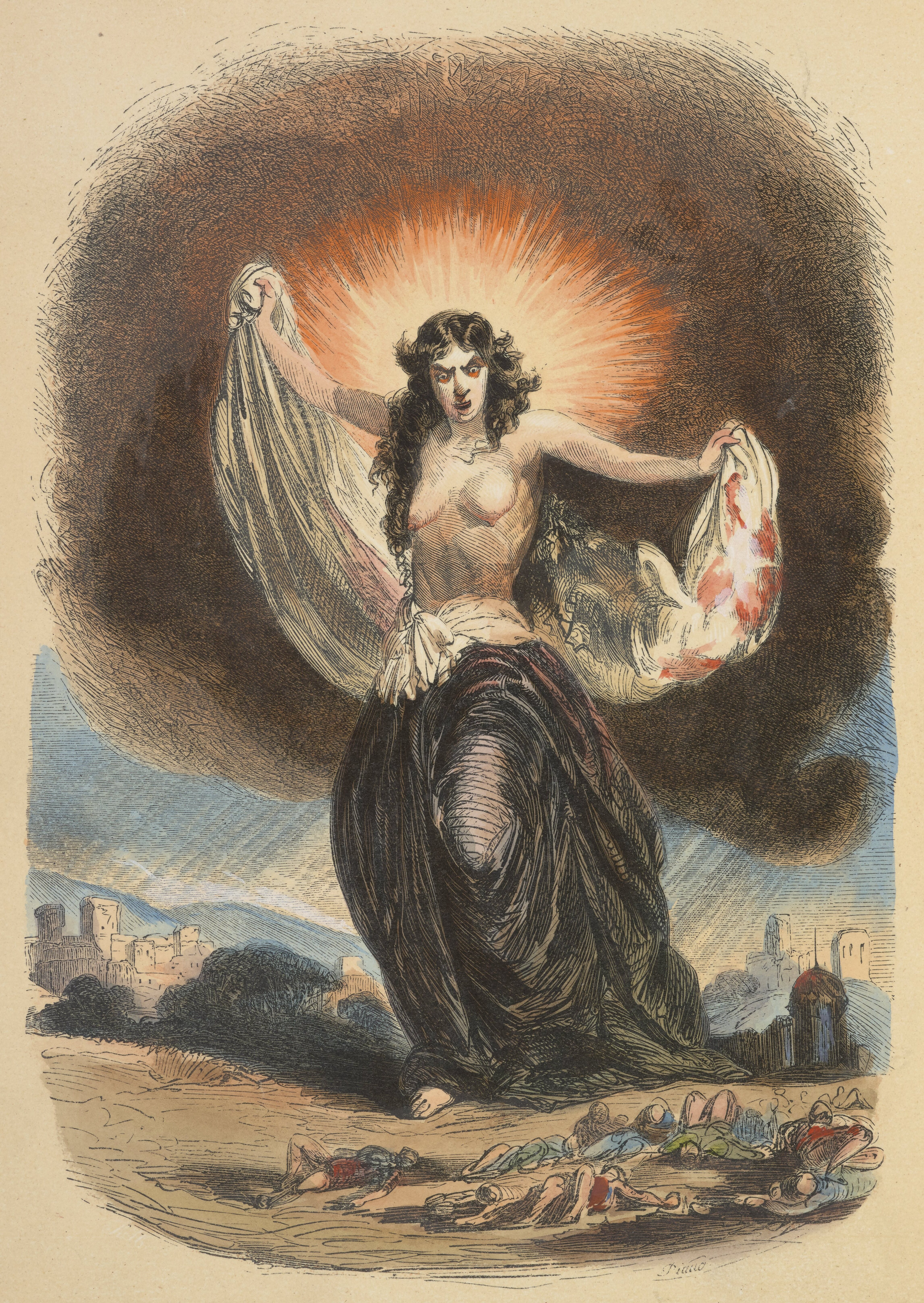
Illustration for Konrad Wallenrod, 1851

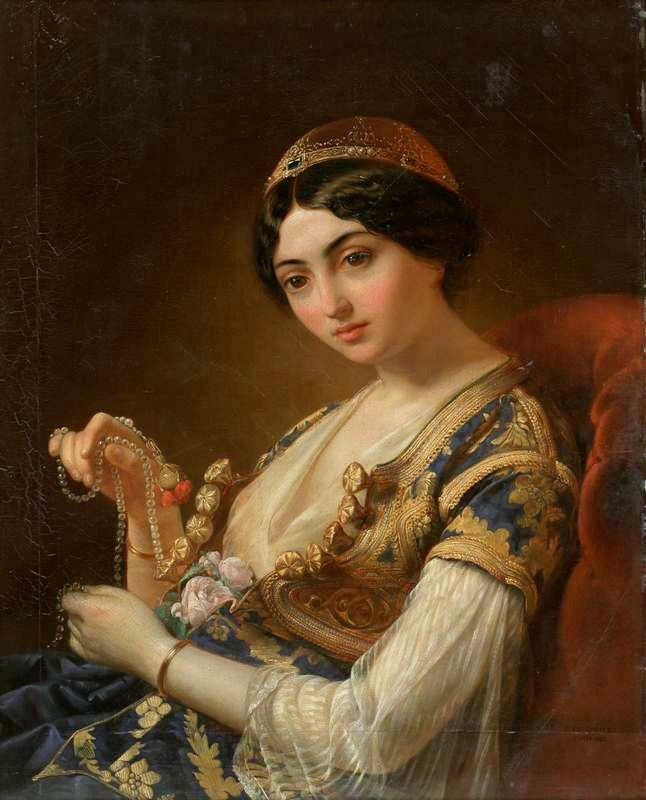
The Moor with the Beads, 1853
