= Gražina =

Gražina is a Lithuanian feminine given name. The name was created by the Polish poet Adam Mickiewicz for the main character of his 1823 poem Grażyna. The name is derived from the Lithuanian adjective gražus, meaning "pretty", "beautiful". In Lithuanian tradition, the name day for Gražina is September 26.

== People ==
Some of the notable Lithuanian people named Gražina include:

- Gražina Degutytė-Švažienė (born 1938), ceramics artist
- Gražina Didelytė (1938–2007), graphic artist and illustrator
- Gražina Didžiūnaitytė (1940–2008), painter
- Gražina Sviderskytė (born 1973), newscaster and author

== See also ==
- Gražina (opera)
- Grażyna
