= Herkus Kunčius =

Lithuanian writer, playwright, and essayist (born 1965)

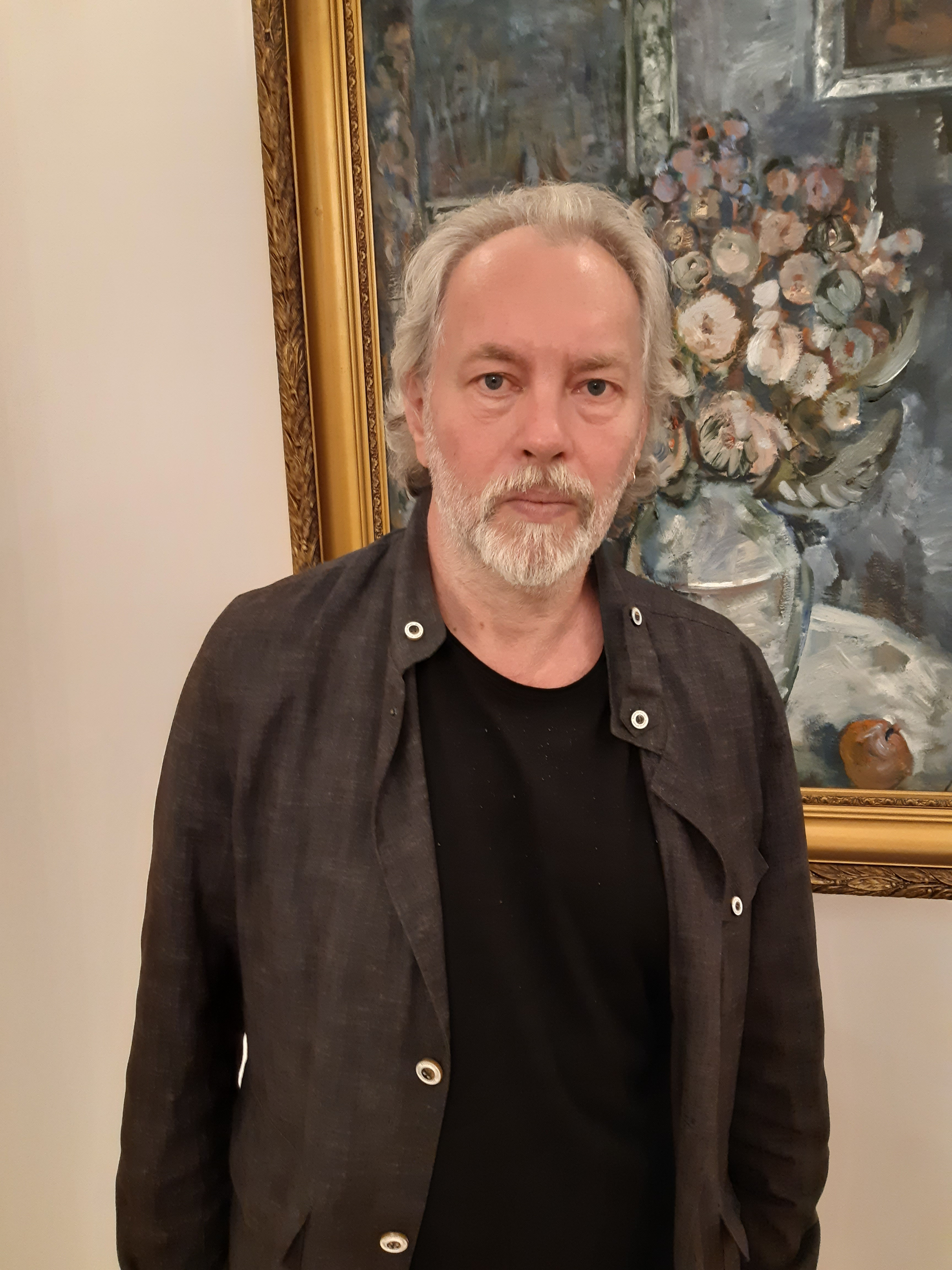
- Kunčius in 2023
- Born: 18 April 1965 (age 61); Vilnius, Lithuania
- Education: Vilnius University
- Occupations: Writer; playwright; essayist
- Writing career
- Years active: 1996–
- Genres: Postmodernism
- Subjects: Soviet Union

Herkus Kunčius (born 18 April 1965) is a Lithuanian writer, playwright, and essayist.

== Biography ==
Herkus Kunčius was born on 18 April 1965 in Vilnius, to Anicetas Kunčius and Aldona Mikšytė. Both of his parents are soloists of the Kaunas State Musical Theatre. Kunčius's grandfather Vladas Mikšys was an organist, choirmaster, and music teacher. Kunčius attended the Kaunas Aušra Gymnasium. He grew up in Kaunas with his parents, but moved to Vilnius to study the history of art. Having finished the Vilnius Academy of Arts in 1990, Kunčius began working at the magazine Krantai until 1994. From 1995 to 1999 Kunčius worked at the Literatūra ir menas magazine. For ten years Kunčius lectured on drama and creative writing in the Vytautas Magnus University.

Kunčius is a member of PEN International, as well as a member of the editorial board of the Lithuanian Writers' Union monthly Metai magazine. Kunčius is a board member of the Jerzy Giedroyc forum of dialogue and cooperation between Lithuanians and Poles. In 2011 Kunčius became the president of the Lithuanian PEN International division.

In 1995 Kunčius was awarded a prize by the Literatūra ir menas magazine for his essays, in 1996 a prize by the Nemunas magazine for best work of prose, in 1998 the Julijonas Lindė-Dobilas prize as well as the modern dramaturgy prize, in 1999 the Lithuanian Theatre Union's Dauguviečio auskaras (Earring of Dauguvietis, named after Borisas Dauguvietis), in 2000 the prize of the Lithuanian Foundation's open dramaturgy competition for children and teenagers, in 2004 the "Fortūnas" diploma of the Kaunas branch of the Lithuanian Theater Union, in 2007 the "Muzų malūnų" prize of Lietuvos rytas daily newspaper, in 2010 the prize of Lithuania's Ministry of Culture for his journalistic works, in 2016 the Knight's Cross of the Order for Merit to Lithuania, in 2019 the Silver Cross of Merit of the Republic of Poland and in 2022 – the Antanas Vaičiulaitis prize. In 2024 he was nominated for the Lithuanian state prize.

== Literary work ==
Kunčius's first novel, Ir dugnas visada priglaus, was published in 1996 in the magazine Metai. Kunčius's works have been described as postmodernist. In his 1999 collection of essays entitled Pilnaties linksmybės, Kunčius re-interprets avant-gardism and expresses doubt about the sacred power and significance of high art. The themes of sex, death, and analysis of metaphysical and social evil prevail in Kunčius's works, as well as the values of the traditional canon such as agricultural culture, compassion, Catholic norms, and moral chastity. Due to his background, Kunčius is also known for creating librettos and operettas, as well as creating a new literary genre of a "novel operetta", displayed in works such as the four-story Šaltasis karas (The Cold War).

Kunčius's works have been translated to English, Bulgarian, Polish, Russian, Swedish, German, and others.

== Bibliography ==
=== Prose and essays ===
- Ir dugnas visada priglaus. – Vilnius, 1996.
- Matka pitka. – Vilnius, 1998.
- Sparnų vaško urna. – Vilnius, 1998.
- Barbarai šventykloje. – Vilnius, 1998.
- Būtasis dažninis kartas. – Vilnius: Tyto alba, 1998.
- Pilnaties linksmybės. – Vilnius: Lietuvos rašytojų sąjungos leidykla, 1999.
- Pelenai asilo kanopoje; Smegenų padažas; Ekskursija: Casa matta. – Vilnius: Lietuvos rašytojų sąjungos leidykla, 2001.
- Ištikimiausias metafizinis draugas. – Vilnius, 2002.
- Ornamentas. – Vilnius: Charibdė, 2002.
- Gaidžių milžinkapis. – Vilnius: Charibdė, 2004.
- Nepasigailėti Dušanskio. – Vilnius: Versus aureus, 2006.
- Išduoti, išsižadėti, apšmeižti. – Vilnius: Lietuvos rašytojų sąjungos leidykla, 2007.
- Virtuvės Tarakono nuotykiai. – Vilnius: Versus aureus, 2008.
- Pijoko chrestomatija. – Vilnius: Versus aureus, 2009.
- Lietuvis Vilniuje. – Vilnius: Kultūros barai, 2011.
- Kaukazo belaisvis. – Vilnius: Metai, 2012.
- Tapti savimi. Pasakiški Bordo memuarai. – Vilnius, 2013.
- Kartą operoje: vieno teatrinio istorija. – Vilnius: Gelmės: Petro ofsetas, 2014.
- Trys mylimos. – Vilnius: Lietuvos rašytojų sąjungos leidykla, 2014.
- Dervišas iš Kauno. – Vilnius: Kultūros barai, 2014.
- Dviveidis romanas. – Vilnius: Kultūros barai, 2015.
- Pramanytos šalies pasakojimai. ‒ Vilnius: Gelmės, 2015.
- Lietuvio ir lenko pokalbis (kartu su P. Kępińskiu). ‒ Vilnius: Versus aureus, 2016.
- Lietuviškos apybraižos. – Vilnius : Lietuvos rašytojų sąjungos leidykla, 2018.
- Geležinė Stalino pirštinė – Vilnius : Lietuvos rašytojų sąjungos leidykla, 2019.
- Nušviesta: komunistinės dvasios dramos – Vilnius: Lietuvių literatūros ir tautosakos institutas, 2020.
- Šaltasis karas: operečių romanas – Vilnius: Lietuvos rašytojų sąjungos leidykla, 2023.
- Litbelas. Neišnešiotas vaiduoklis – Vilnius: Lietuvos rašytojų sąjungos leidykla, 2023.

=== Plays and librettos ===
- Genijaus dirbtuvė. – 1998.
- Saulės smūgis. – 1998.
- Euforinė laisvalaikio karuselė. – 1999.
- Domingo de Ramos. – 1999.
- Dviejų karalysčių kaimas (kartu su A. Šlepiku). – 1999.
- Sučiuptas velnias (Žemaitės apsakymų motyvais). – 2001.
- Šokoladinis Mocartas. – 2001.
- Kipras, Fiodoras ir kiti. – 2003.
- Upės vardu. – 2004.
- Matas. – 2005.
- Besmegenio orkestras. – 2005.
- Dirbtinis pluoštas. – 2006.
- Žvejų dainos. 2007.
- DaliGala. – 2008.
- 00.45 minutės pagal Goldingą. – 2008.
- Eglė žalčių karalienė (kartu su A. Šlepiku). – 2008.
- Rojaus prieangyje. – 2012.
