= Karnavičius =

- Lithuanian surname
- m.: Karnavičius
- f.: (unmarried): Karnavičiūtė
- f.: (married): Karnavičienė

Karnavičius is a Lithuanian-language surname. It corresponds to the East Slavic surname Karnovich and Polish surname Karnowicz of East Slavic origin. Notable people with the surname include:

- Jurgis Karnavičius (composer) (1884–1941), composer
- Jurgis Karnavičius (1912–2001), son of Jurgis Karnavičius (1884–1941), pianist and long-time rector of the Lithuanian Academy of Music and Theatre
- Jurgis Karnavičius (pianist) (born 1957), son of Jurgis Karnavičius (1912-2001), Lithuanian pianist
