= Radvila Perkūnas =

Lithuanian-language opera

Radvila Perkūnas (Radziwiłł the Piorun, Radziwiłł the Thunderbolt) is a Lithuanian-language opera in four acts by Jurgis Karnavičius to the libretto of a musical play written for the opera by Balys Sruoga which premiered at the Kaunas State Theater on February 15, 1937, on the eve of Independence Day. Although Sruoga was not satisfied either with Karnavičius' music, nor with the production by the director P. Olekas, nevertheless the opera met with great success with the public.

In 1948 when the theatre archive was moved to the new capital Vilnius, the opera score was considered lost but the opera was revived and staged at the Kaunas State Musical Theater during the 2018 International Mykolas Oginskis Festival, conducted by Jonas Janulevičius, performed by orchestra, choir, ballet artists and soloists of the Kaunas State Musical Theatre.

== Plot ==
The opera is set at the time of Krzysztof "Piorun" Radziwiłł when the rivalry between the most powerful families of Lithuania - the Radvilas and the Chodkiewiczs - almost descended into civil war.

== Roles ==
Note: "Katkus" below refers to the surname Chodkiewicz, coming from Chodko, i.e., Chodko Jurewicz, founder of the Chodkiewicz family

- KRISTUPAS RADVILA PERKUNAS
- JONUŠAS, son of Kristupas Radvila
- SOFIJA OLELKAITĖ, Duchess of Sluck
- JERONIMAS KATKUS, Vilnius castellan
- SOFIJA KATKUVIENĖ, Katkus's wife
- Merkelis Giedraitis, Bishop of Samogitia
- RUTKA, Jesuit monk
- BUOŽIUS, Vilnius man
- BILDŽIUS, Radvila nobleman,
- MIKNILA, Radvila noble
- BRUŽYS, Katkus nobleman
- AGNĖ, Sofia's friend
- MAGDĖ, member of Katkus court
- SKARIJA, Vilnius Jew, merchant
- BEGGAR
- I VILNIUS WOMAN
- II VILNIUS WOMAN
- KNIGHTS
