= Plungė Manor =

Coordinates: 55°55′10″N 21°50′39″E

- Plungės dvaras (Lithuanian)
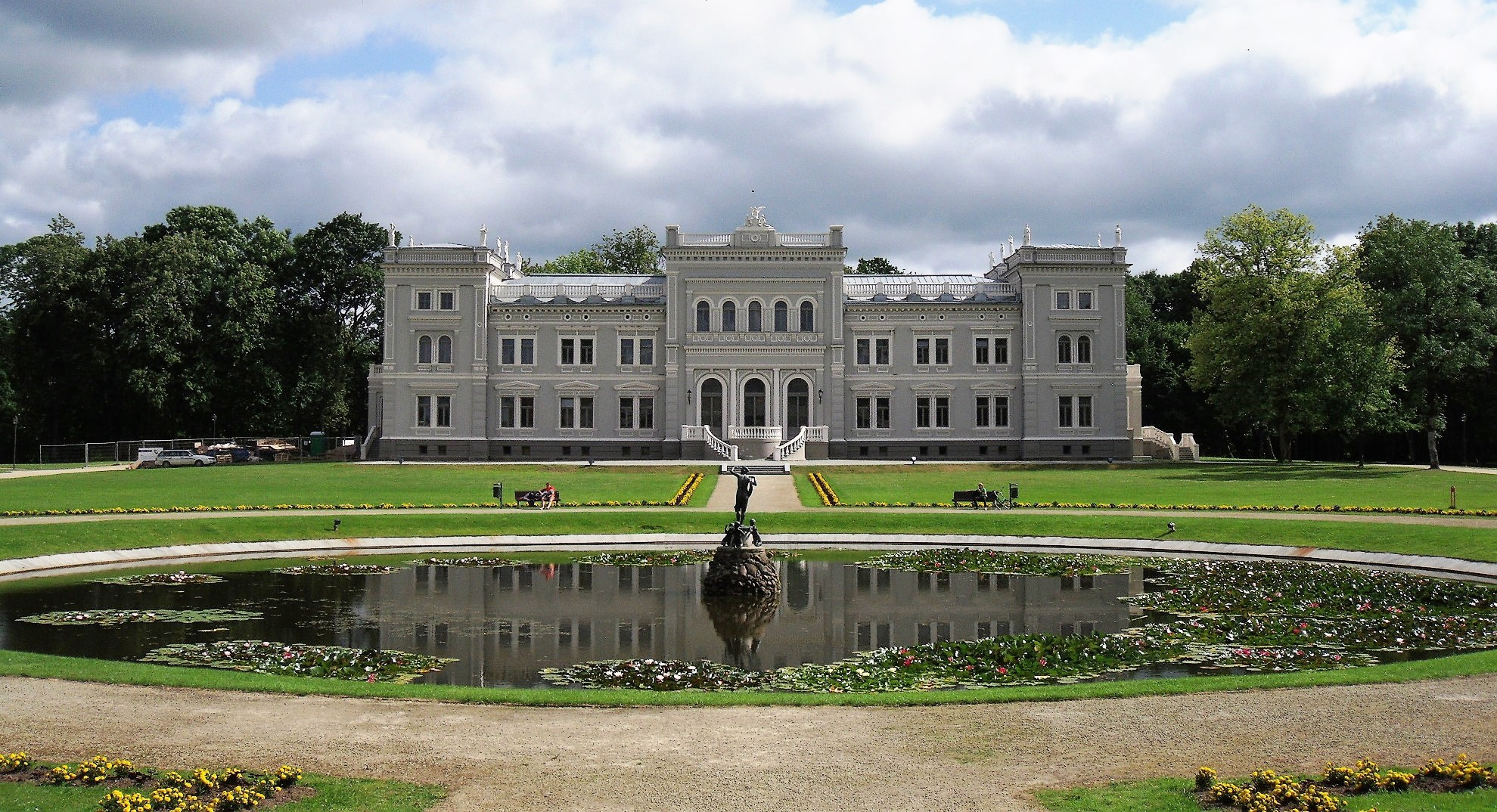
- Plungė Manor in 2020

- Location within Lithuania
- Interactive map of Plungė Manor
- Type: Residential manor
- Location: Plungė, Lithuania

History
- Built: 1879
- Built for: Michał Ogiński

Site notes
- Architect: Karlas Lorencas
- Architectural style: Renaissance Revival
- Owner: Samogitian Art Museum
- Website: www.zdm.lt

Cultural Monuments of Lithuania
- Type: National
- Designated: 12 September 2000
- Reference no.: 988

Plungė Manor (Lithuanian: Plungės dvaras) is a former Ogiński family residential manor in Plungė, Lithuania. It now harbors the Samogitian Art Museum.

== History ==
Plungė manor has been mentioned since 1565. For many years, the estate was a landholding of the Grand Duke of Lithuania and Plungė eldership. Different noble families including Dorohostaiskiai, Valavičiai, Krišpinai-Kiršenšteinai and Karp administered it.

In 1779, King Stanisław Augustus Poniatowski (1732–1798) assigned Plungė eldership and the manor to Vilnius Bishop Ignacy Jakub Massalski (1726–1794).

=== The Zubov Family ===
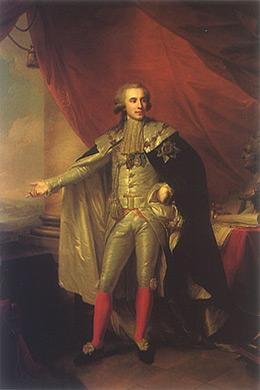
Platon Zubov by Johann Baptist von Lampi the Elder

In 1795, following the 3rd Partition of the Polish–Lithuanian Commonwealth, Catherine II, Tsarina of the Russian Empire gave 170,000 acres of land to Platon Zubov (1767–1822) for his loyalty and service. Zubov was one of the initiators of the Polish Partitions and Catherine’s favourite.

On 8 March 1806 Count Zubov received Plungė Estate from Wincenty Gaweł Potocki (1740–1825).

The estate was later inherited by Platon Zubov’s nephew, Alexandrovich Zubov.

The Zubov family would own the area for the next 67 years (1806–1873).

The Zubov period was very important for the area. It is thought that the villa (known by Plungė people as the ‘clock-house’) imitating Florence’s Gothic masterpiece Palazzo Vecchio was built on the estate park during Alexandrovich Zubov’s time. The date ‘1846’ is inscribed on the foundation of the south façade, and probably indicates the year of construction.

The Zubov family built buildings, repaired roads, businesses flourished and educational and cultural institutions were established.

Platon Zubov’s brother, Count Dmitry Zubov (1764–1836) developed the landscaped parks at both Kretinga and Plungė Manors. They were completed in 1839.

In 1873 Alexandrovich Zubov family sold Plungė estate to Michał Mikołaj Ogiński.

=== Michał Mikołaj Ogiński (1849-1902) ===
Over the next thirteen years, Michał Ogiński constructed a new ensemble of buildings at Plungė Manor.

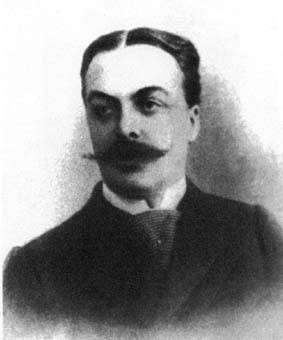
Michał Mikołaj Ogiński

In 1879, he ordered the main mansion to be built, designed by architect Karl Lorenz, who was of German origin. Lorenz and the performer of works Gotrfried Schrank created the flamboyant ensemble, incorporated into the old mixed-style park. The palace came to be known as ‘Versailles of Samogitia’. This was the Ogiński family's residential home.

The two servants’ houses (on the right the manor administration and kitchen were located and on the left, a chapel, and later an orphanage), a Neo-Gothic stud farm, monumental gates of the park with a guard’s house, a laundry house, auxiliary gates and the house for the pheasant keeper, were also built. The ‘clock-house’ was reconstructed next to the orangery, and other buildings for servants were built.

The interior was decorated with mouldings, paintings, ornate stoves and collectible furniture. The plaster moulding came from the workshops of Kazimierz Sommer in Warsaw.

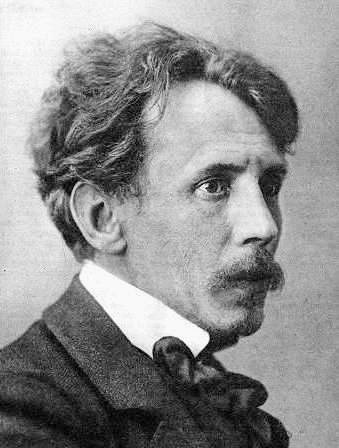
Mikalojus Konstantinas Čiurlionis

Ogiński was a passionate collector, filling the mansion with hundreds of family portraits, marble busts, porcelain, jewellery, tapestry collections, archaeological finds and numismatic collections, an archive and a library. At the turn of the 20th century, the Ogiński residence was famous for its musical traditions, collections of European and folk art, archaeology, numismatics, books, manuscripts, feasts held by the hosts of the manor, along with scientific, technological and economic innovations. The palace had a large and rich library and a family museum.

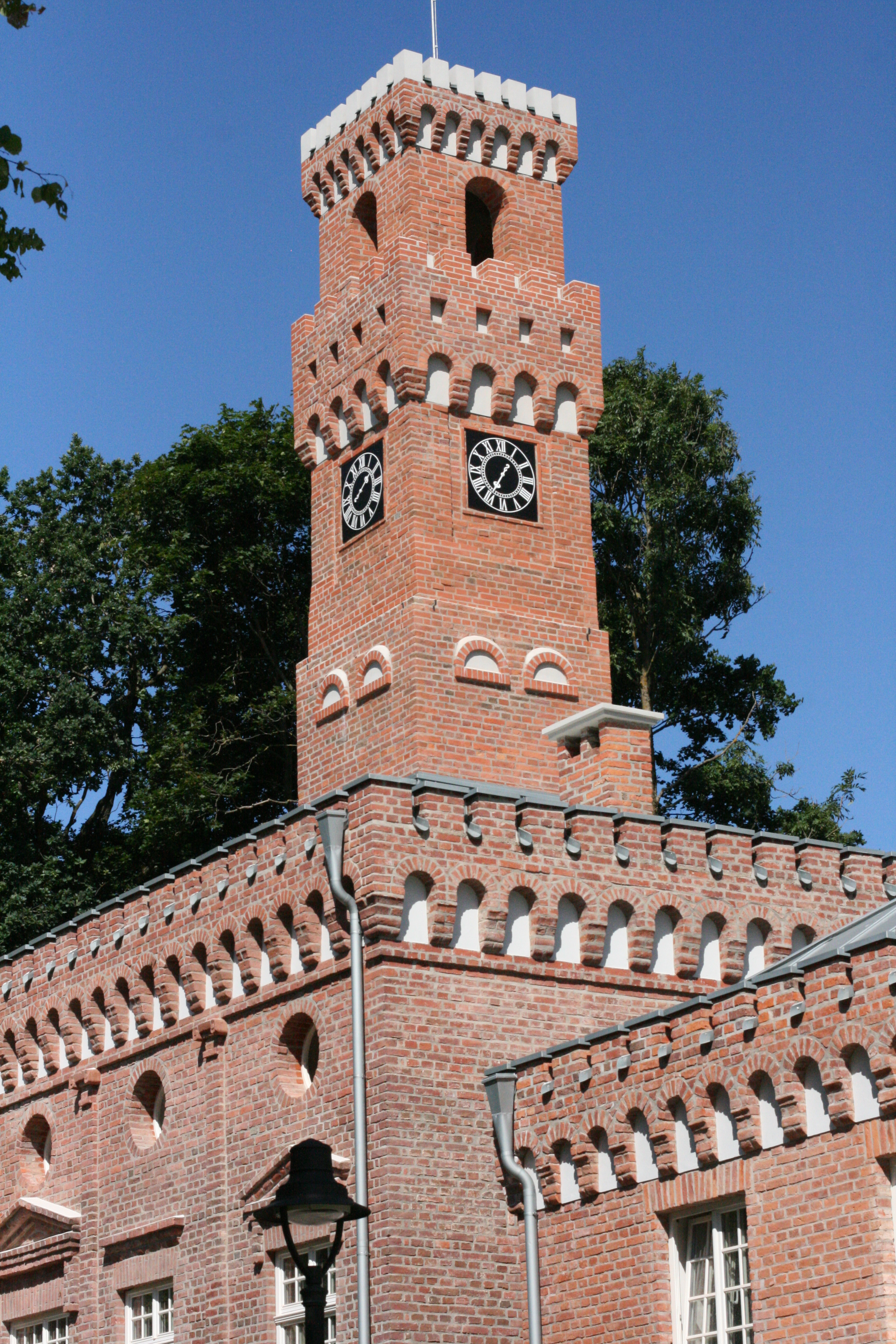
Plungė Manor ‘clock-house’

Michał Ogiński was a philanthropist and educator, known for fostering scientific and technical innovations in agriculture. Through 1873–1902 the Ogiński mansion operated the Plungė orchestra school. The school trained musicians for string, wind and symphony orchestras. The musicians of the Plungė orchestra played on the Eiffel Tower in Paris on a French national holiday. The famous Lithuanian composer and artist Mikalojus Konstantinas Čiurlionis (1875–1911) also studied here. Michał Ogiński went on to support Čiurlionis' studies at the Warsaw and Leipzig Conservatory.

Maria Skurzewska (1857–1945) married Ogiński in 1879. She looked after the care and education of orphans and the poor. The couple devoted a great deal of time to the town of Plungė. They built a house of commerce, a Jewish gymnasium and on orphanage.

In 1901, Michał Ogiński suddenly fell ill and died while getting treatment in Nice, France. He was buried in Rietavas, in the chapel of Dawn Gate - the mausoleum of the Ogiński family. In 1905, after Lithuanian press ban was lifted, the widowed Duchess established an official Lithuanian school in Plungė. After the outbreak of the World War I, Ogińska fled to Poznań, where she died in 1945. After the war, the manor was governed by designated administrators. Although they tried to honestly fulfil their functions, the property gradually fell into decline.

=== Interwar Period ===
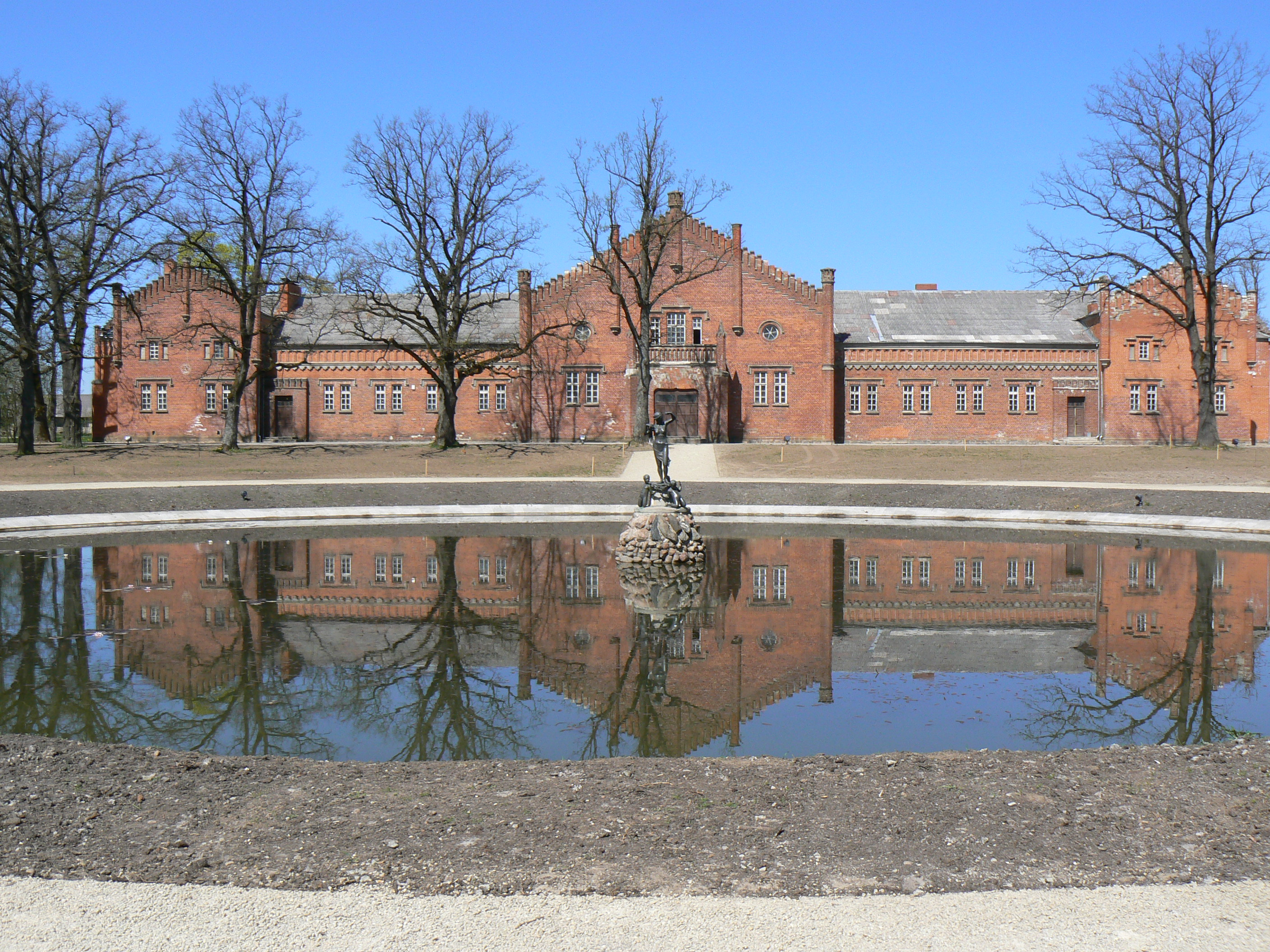
Plungė Manor Horse Barn

During the Lithuanian land reform, in the period from 1918 to 1919, the lands of Plungė Manor and holdings were expropriated. After Maria Ogrińska refused to return to Lithuania, in 1921, the state took over the manor house as well.

Soon different institutions were set up. By 1934, the buildings of the manor accommodated the gymnasium of Saulė, Motiejus Valančius School, a teachers’ seminary, and the national stud farm.

From 1934 to 1940, when the 6th infantry of Margis and the 4th regiment of artillery were stationed at the manor, the ensemble and park were transferred for their use. The grounds had the headquarters of the military units, an officers’ club, and some apartments were installed for officers’ families.

=== Soviet Period ===
At the beginning of World War II, the palace and other buildings were severely damaged by fire and vandalized by Soviet soldiers.

Reconstruction started in 1956. The manor was reconstructed and restored again in 1961. The same year, a secondary school was established in the palace. In 1964, Plungė Manor housed the Construction Technical School.

In 1994, the Samogitian Art Museum started operating. By that time, the manor house had no authentic interiors or cultural treasures left.

=== The Present Period ===
Today the manor houses the Samogitian Art Museum.

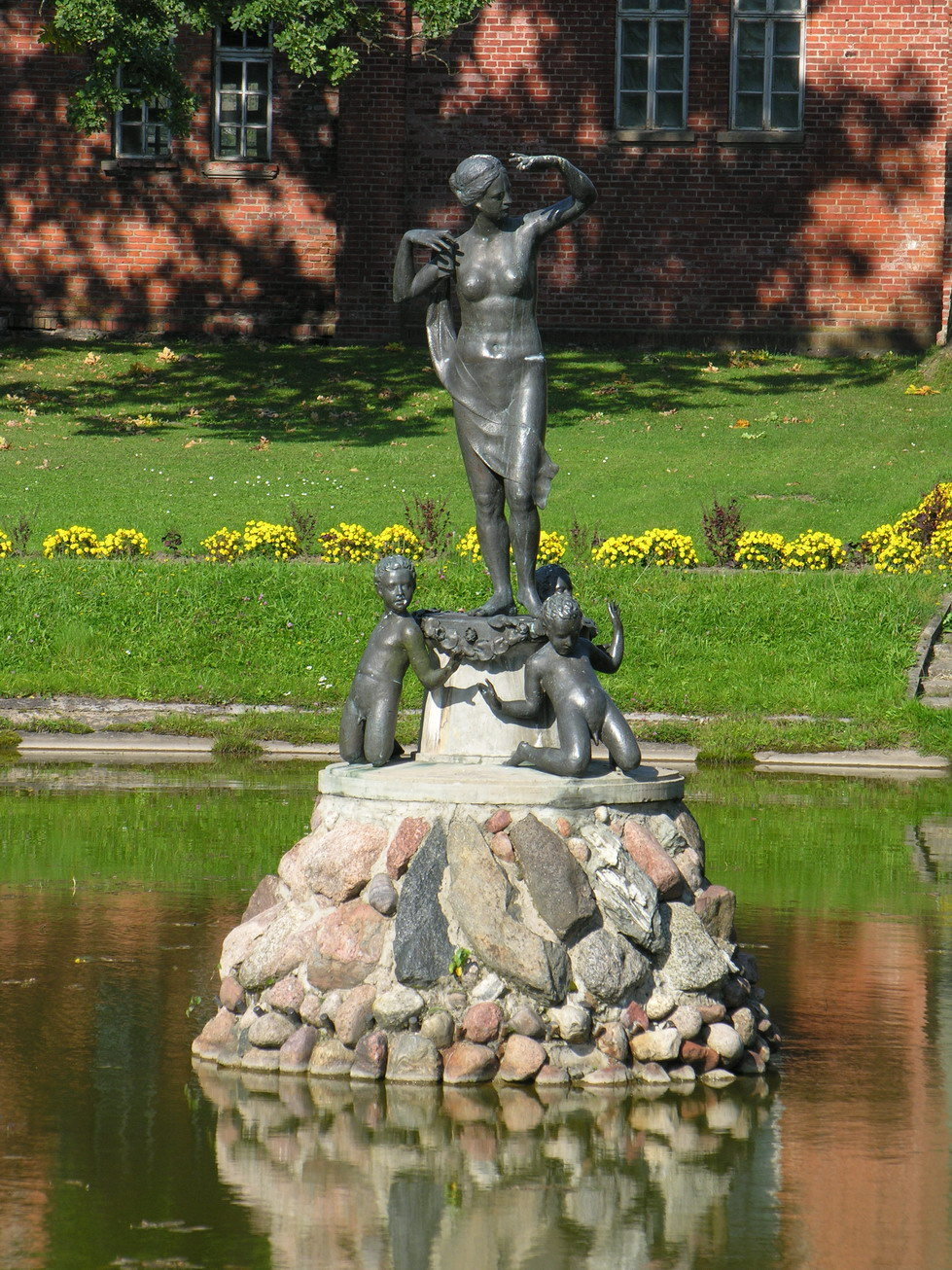
Park fragment

== Manor Park ==
The famous Plungė Park was established in the mid-18th century. The area of the park is about 143 acres. (approx. 0.6 km^{2}) The park is planted in the riversides of the river Babrungas. Nowadays it is one of the most remarkable and valuable compounded parks of Lithuania.

=== Oak of the Thunder God ===
In the borders of the manor park, grows a huge oak, called the oak of the Thunder God, or Perkūnas in Lithuanian, from ancient pagan beliefs. Legend tells that priestess Galinda stoked a sacred fire near this oak. One day her lover went forth to war against the Crusaders to defend his homeland nation. Sadly, he never returned. The chief priest, seeing Galinda’s tears and heartache, began to teach her that only a sacred fire can quench her earthly pain. Once, when Galinda was weeping under the oak, a thunder struck the tree. Oak shook greatly, some soil had poured into its trunk – and soon the flower of incredible beauty sprouted out of the trunk of the oak. Since then people started to call it on behalf of Thunder God. Some believe that the huge oak that grows in the park is the same one from the legend. It was declared a National Monument.
