= Grazyna Kochanska =

Psychologist

- Born: Grażyna Kochańska
- Occupation: Professor of Psychology
- Awards: (2017) G. Stanley Hall Award for Distinguished Contributions to Developmental Psychology (American Psychological Association)

Academic background
- Education: Ph.D., M.A. University of Warsaw

Grazyna Kochanska is a Polish-American developmental psychologist known for her research on parent-child relationships, developmental psychopathology, child temperament and its role in social development. She is the Stuit Professor of Developmental Psychology at the University of Iowa.

Kochanska was the 2017 recipient of the G. Stanley Hall Award for Distinguished Contributions to Developmental Psychology, given by the American Psychological Association (APA) Division 7.

== Biography ==
Kochanska grew up in Warsaw, Poland, and earned her Ph.D. from the University of Warsaw under the supervision of Janusz Reykowski.

Kochanska immigrated to the United States in 1981. She completed post-doctoral work at the University of Massachusetts in Amherst, Massachusetts, the Institute for Advanced Study in Princeton, New Jersey, and the Laboratory of Developmental Psychology at the National Institute of Mental Health (NIMN) in Bethesda, Maryland. At NIMH, Kochanska worked with Marian Radke-Yarrow on studies of child-rearing practices, children's noncompliance to adult directives, and the development of inhibitory control.

In 1991, she started her own laboratory at the University of Iowa, conducting research on social emotional development and developmental psychopathology. Her research has aimed to understand the interplay between children's biologically based characteristics and parent-child relationships in the origins of adaptive and maladaptive developmental pathways in children's social emotional development. Her research on the development of a conscience in early childhood was supported by grants from the National Science Foundation the MacArthur Foundation, and the Laura Spelman Rockefeller fund.

== Research ==
Kochanska led the longitudinal Children and Parents Study (CAPS) on young children's social and emotional development, focusing on differences in children's temperament, parents' attachment styles, and their influences on children's early development. Her research team studied mother–child and father–child relationships in approximately 200 families and found evidence of intergenerational transmission of adaptive and maladaptive behaviors. The team assessed children's attachment to both parents at age 15–17 months using the strange situation paradigm, and reported benefits of children having secure attachments with both parents.

Some Kochanska's most cited research explored young children's inhibitory control, a critical aspect of temperament related to executive functioning. One of her studies examined inhibitory control in relation to internalization of rules at ages 26–41 months and again at 43–56 months. At both ages, girls outperformed boys across tasks designed to provide opportunities to break the rules, such as playing a game where it was possible to cheat or being left alone with a forbidden object. Individual differences in inhibitory control were associated with internalization at both ages, with individual differences exhibiting stability.

Other research traced the development of self-regulation over the first four years of a child's life. Kochanska's team examined different forms of behavioral compliance in over 100 children at ages 14, 22, 33, and 45 months. The researchers contrasted "do" contexts where the mother asked her child sustain a tedious behavior that they didn't enjoy vs. "don't" contexts where the mother asked her child to suppress a behavior that was enjoyable. Girls showed higher levels of committed compliance than boys, where they appeared to embrace their mother's directives eagerly and exhibited compliance even when left alone. Although the "do" contexts were much harder than the "don't" contexts, children's compliance was stable over time, suggesting that self-regulation exhibits stable individual differences.

== Representative publications ==
- Kochanska, G. (1993). Toward a synthesis of parental socialization and child temperament in early development of conscience. Child Development, 64(2), 325–347.
- Kochanska, G. (2002). Committed compliance, moral self, and internalization: A mediational model. Developmental Psychology, 38(3), 339–351.
- Kochanska, G. (2002). Mutually responsive orientation between mothers and their young children: A context for the early development of conscience. Current Directions in Psychological Science, 11(6), 191–195.
- Kochanska, G., Coy, K. C., & Murray, K. T. (2001). The development of self‐regulation in the first four years of life. Child Development, 72(4), 1091–1111.
- Kochanska, G., Murray, K. T., & Harlan, E. T. (2000). Effortful control in early childhood: continuity and change, antecedents, and implications for social development. Developmental Psychology, 36(2), 220.
- Kochanska, G., Murray, K., Jacques, T. Y., Koenig, A. L., & Vandegeest, K. A. (1996). Inhibitory control in young children and its role in emerging internalization. Child Development, 67(2), 490–507.
