= Gražina (opera) =

Lithuanian opera

Gražina is a Lithuanian-language opera in four acts by Jurgis Karnavičius (composer) to a libretto by Kazys Inčiūra after the poem by Adam Mickiewicz. The opera premiered on February 16, 1933, in the then capital Kaunas at the State Theatre as the first Lithuanian opera in independent Lithuania. At the premiere conducted by Mykolas Bukša and directed by Petr Oleka, the role of Gražina was sung by Vladislava Grigaitienė and Liutauras by Kipras Petrauskas.
