= Wanda Grażyna Gałecka-Szmurło =

Polish lawyer and independence and social activist

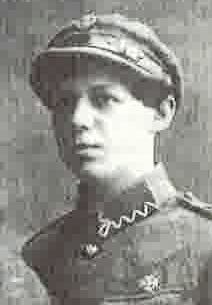
Wanda Grażyna Gałecka-Szmurło

Wanda Grażyna Gałecka-Szmurło (21 August 1899 in Warsaw – 10 January 1993) was a Polish lawyer, independence and social activist. She was the second woman in Poland who was entered on the list of lawyers.

She conducted intensive social and journalistic activities in the field of law, she also participated in legislative works in the field of matrimonial property law. Advocate Wanda Grażyna Szmurło was appointed by the Minister of National Defense Janusz Onyszkiewicz (by order of 3 July 1992) a second lieutenant in the Polish Army.
