= Jurgis Karnavičius (pianist) =

Lithuanian pianist

Jurgis Karnavičius (born 30 April 1957 in Vilnius) is a Lithuanian pianist.

Karnavičius comes from a renowned family of musicians: his grandfather, Jurgis Karnavičius (1884–1941), was a composer, and his father, also named Jurgis (1912–2001), was a pianist and the long-time rector of the Lithuanian Academy of Music.

Karnavičius graduated from the Lithuanian Academy of Music in 1980, specializing in the piano. He then continued his studies at the Moscow Conservatory for several more years.

Jurgis Karnavičius is a piano soloist who has played with different orchestras, and he often accompanies his wife, the opera singer Sigutė Stonytė. In recent years he has been actively collaborating with several chamber ensembles, preparing concert programmes with the M. K. Čiurlionis String Quartet, Lithuanian Art Museum Quartet, Sostinės String Trio, and others. He has played well over one hundred solo concerts. In 2004, Jurgis Karnavičius earned a professorship with the Lithuanian Academy of Music.
