= Lithuanian Theatre Union =

Coordinates: 54°40′56″N 25°16′26″E

The Lithuanian Theatre Union (Lithuanian: Lietuvos teatro sąjunga) is the official theatrical union of Lithuania. The association awards Lithuanian stage actors and plays with annual awards, from Best Actor and Best Young Actor categories to Best Productions. It declared independence from the new Soviet-based Union of Theatre Workers (Союз театральных деятелей) before the abortive coup of August 1991 and the recognition of the independence of the Baltic states. Many of the top theatre critics and people are a member of this union, which numbered 1000 members in 1987.

== Chairmen ==
- Regimantas Adomaitis (1987–1989)
- Juozas Budraitis (1989–1996)
- Algis Matulionis (1996–2011)
- Ramutis Rimeikis (since 2011)
- Juozas Marcinkevičius (since December 2022)
