= Michał Mikołaj Ogiński =

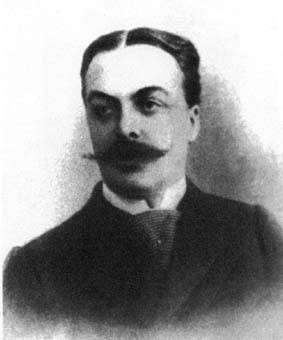
- Born: April 25, 1849; Rietavas, Russian Empire
- Died: March 24, 1902 (aged 52); Nice, French Third Republic
- Other names: Mykolas Mikalojus Oginskis
- Spouse: Maria Skórzewska
- Parents: Ireneusz Kleofas Ogiński (father); Olga Kalinowska (mother)

Michał Mikołaj Ogiński (Lithuanian: Mykolas Mikalojus Oginskis; April 25, 1849 – March 24, 1902) was a Polish-Lithuanian noble, marshal of the Telšiai county's nobility, cultural activist.

== Family and life ==
Michał Mikołaj Ogińsk was a son of Ireneusz Kleofas Ogiński and Olga Kalinowska of Wielka Kamionka, and grandson of Michał Kleofas Ogiński. He graduated from the men's gymnasium in Šiauliai. Michał Ogiński inherited his father's palace in Zaliessie, but did not want to live there. In 1873, he bought the estate in Plungė from Alexander Zubov and built Plungė Manor designed by Karol Lorenz or Friedrich August Stüler.

On July 22, 1876, he married Maria Skórzewska, daughter of Zygmunt Skórzewski, 2nd Ordynat of Radomice-Czerniejów, and Konstancja, née Potulicka. The wedding took place in Czerniejewo during the Kulturkampf period and was a Polish patriotic demonstration. The couple initially lived in Rietavas, and moved to Plungė after the palace was built. They were active in social and cultural activities. Ogiński founded a private orchestra and a music school, where Lithuania's most prominent composer Mikalojus Konstantinas Čiurlionis took lessons in 1889–1893. With the help of Ogiński, he was later educated in Warsaw.

Ogiński fell ill and went to France for treatments. He died suddenly without an heir in Nice on March 24, 1902. In 1909, his brother Bohdan also died childless, thus extinguishing the senatorial line of the family. After her husband's death, Maria Ogiński lived in Plungė and continued the social activities she had begun with her husband. At the beginning of World War I, she settled in Vilnius, and in 1918 went to Poznań, where she died on March 22, 1945. Her estate was taken over by the Lithuanian government in 1921.

== Activities ==
Ogiński accumulated works of art, archaeological finds, hunting trophies, and a book collection. Among the collections, the collection of family portraits, consisting of about 100 canvases and sculptures, was of particular value. The collection included paintings by Marcello Bacciarelli, Bernardo Bellotto, Johann Baptist von Lampi the Elder. Among the family heirlooms were two silver Hetman's buławas.

Together with his brother Bohdan Ogińki, he organized periodic agricultural and industrial exhibitions at their estate. He helped peasant children with their education. In 1892, Michał and Bohdan Ogińskis together Józef Tyszkiewicz from the nearby Kretinga Manor built a private 50-kilometre (31 mi) long telephone line connecting their estates. This was the first telephone line in Lithuania.

After the Kražiai massacre, he informed Emperor Alexander III of the events.

Plungė was mostly inhabited by Jews. On June 29, 1894, a fire broke out there, 80 Christian and 323 Jewish houses burned down, as well as the Great Synagogue and other houses of worship. Many families were taken in by Bohdan Ogiński in Rietavas. Michał Ogiński received fire victims at his palace. He then undertook the reconstruction of the town. He built a brick trading house, a new bathhouse, and borrowed 4,000 rubles to rebuild the Great Synagogue.

== Bibliography ==
- Chwalewik, Edward (1927). Zbiory polskie. Archiwa, biblioteki, gabinety, galerie, muzea i inne zbiory pamiątek przeszłości w ojczyźnie i na obczyźnie w porządku alfabetycznym według miejscowości ułożone [Polish Collections. Archives, libraries, cabinets, galleries, museums and other collections of memorabilia of the past in the homeland and abroad in alphabetical order by location arranged] (in Polish). Vol. 2. Warsaw-Kraków.
- Nowicki, Ryszard (2016). "Rękopiśmienne pamiętniki Marii księżnej Ogińskiej" [The manuscript diaries of Maria Princess Ogińska]. Z Badań nad Książką i Księgozbiorami Historycznymi. 10.
- Siedlecka, Jadwiga (1996). Mikołaj Konstantny Čiurlionis 1875-1911. Preludium warszawskie. Warsaw.
