= Grażyna (poem) =

1823 Narrative poem by Adam Mickiewicz

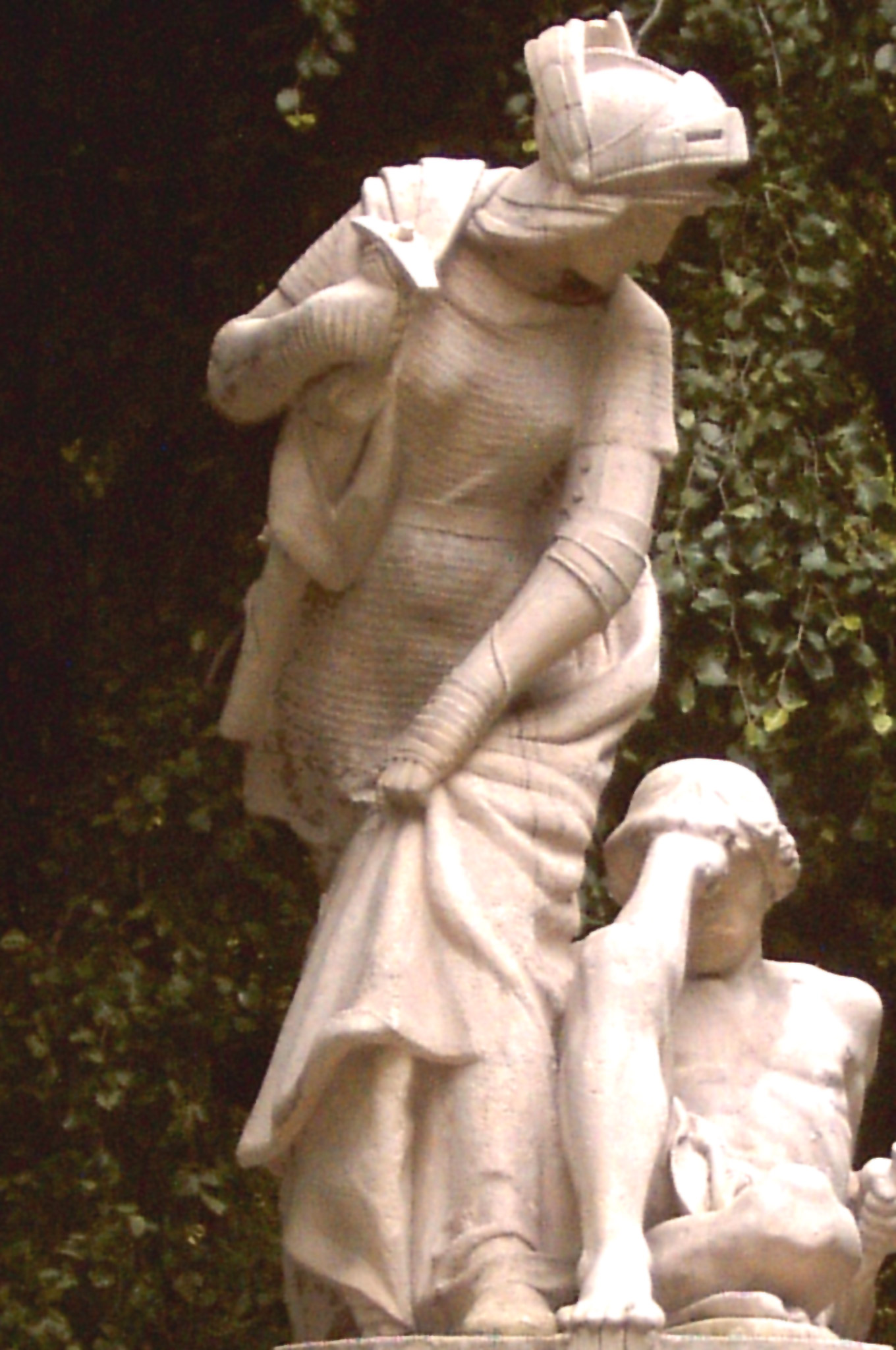
- Grażyna: marble statue based on Adam Mickiewicz's poem, in Kraków's Planty Park
- Author: Adam Mickiewicz
- Original title: Grażyna. Powieść litewska
- Language: Polish
- Genre: Narrative epic poetry

Grażyna is an 1823 narrative poem by Adam Mickiewicz, written in the summer of 1822 during a year-long sabbatical in Vilnius, while away from his teaching duties in Kaunas.

The poem describes the exploits of a mythical Lithuanian chieftainess Grażyna (Lithuanian: Gražina) against the forces of the medieval Order of the Teutonic Knights. The woman character is believed to have been based on Mickiewicz's own sweetheart from Kaunas, Karolina Kowalska. The name was originally conceived by Mickiewicz himself, having used the root of the Lithuanian adjective graži, meaning "beautiful".

It was said by Polish writer Christien Ostrowski to have inspired Emilia Plater, a military heroine of the November 1830 Uprising.

== Musical settings ==
In 1933 the poem served as the basis for the first opera in the newly independent Lithuania.

In 1955, Ukrainian composer Boris Lyatoshinsky composed an eponymous orchestral work based on the poem in commemoration of the centenary of Mickiewicz's death.
