= Jurgis Karnavičius (composer) =

Lithuanian composer

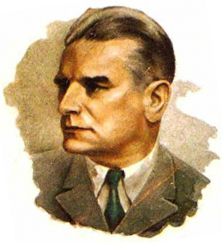
Jurgis Karnavičius

Jurgis Karnavičius (23 April 1884 – 22 December 1941) was a Lithuanian composer of classical music and a forerunner of the development of Lithuanian operatic works.

== Biography ==
Karnavičius was born in Kaunas, Lithuania, which at the time was a part of the Russian Empire. After completing his basic education in his homeland, he began the study of Law in St. Petersburg, Russia.

Karnavičius's son, also named Jurgis Karnavičius (1912–2001), was a pianist and the long-time rector of the Lithuanian Academy of Music. His grandson, Jurgis Karnavičius (born 1957), is a concert pianist.

Music had always been his main interest, and he began to simultaneously study music theory and composition. This soon superseded his pursuit of a career in the legal profession. His primary instrument was the viola. Eventually he became a professor at the Conservatory of Music in the now renamed city of Leningrad. During this period he began experimenting with his own theories of musical composition and began writing his own works.

In 1927, Karnavičius returned to Lithuania, which had only regained its independence as a sovereign nation less than ten years earlier. In addition to teaching at the Conservatory of Music in Kaunas, he opted to play the viola with the orchestra of the State Opera for a number of years. Having a personal desire write a new opera himself, and under the influence of the renewed national pride released by Lithuania's regaining its independence, Karnavičius began to write his first opera, Gražina (opera), which premiered on February 16, 1933 as the first Lithuanian national opera in the independent state. It had incorporated more than forty melodies borrowed from Lithuanian folk songs, and was a popular success. It is considered among the first of the "Lithuanian National Operas". This was followed in 1937 by the opera Radvila Perkūnas about the Lithuanian nobleman Krzysztof Mikołaj Radziwiłł.

== Selected works ==
Stage

- Gražuolė (Beauty; La Bellote), Ballet in 1 act, Op.17 (1927); libretto by Pavel Petrov
- Gražina (opera), Opera in 4 acts (1932); libretto by Kazys Inčiūra after poem by Adam Mickiewicz
- Radvila Perkūnas, Opera in 4 acts, 7 scenes (1936); libretto by Balys Sruoga
- Barocco, Ballet in 1 act (1938); libretto by Lesley Blanch
- Apsišaukėlis (The Impostor), Ballet in 1 act (1940); libretto by Helene France
- Jaunimas žaidžia (Youth at Play; Jeunesse s'amuse), Ballet in 1 act (1940); libretto by the composer

Orchestral

- Džigūnas, Lithuanian Dance
- Groteskas (Grotesque), Lithuanian Dance
- Tema su variacijomis (Theme with Variations) (1912)
- Ulalumė, Symphonic Poem, Op.8 (1917)
- Lietuviškoji fantazija (Lithuanian Fantasy), Op.15 (1925)
- Ovalus portretas (The Oval Portrait), Symphonic Poem, Op.18 (1927)

Chamber music

- String Quartet in F major
- Variations on the Lithuanian Folk Song "Siuntė mane motinėlė" for violin and piano (1907)
- String Quartet No.1, Op.1 (1913)
- 2 Romance-Caprices for violin solo, Op.4 (1915)
- String Quartet No.2, Op.6 (1917, published 1928)
- Poema for cello and piano (1917)
- String Quartet No.3, Op.10 (1922)
- String Quartet No.4 (1925)
- Lietuviškoji fantazija (Lithuanian Fantasy) for string quartet, Op.15 (1925)

Piano

- Piano Sonata (1909)
- Variacijos originalia tema (Variations on Original Theme) (1910)
- Šokis (Dance) (1916)
- Lopšinė (Lullaby) (1929)

Vocal

- Gluosnį linguoja (Swinging Willow) for voice and viola (1916); words by Konstantin Balmont
- Serenada (Serenade) for voice and viola (1916); words by Afanasy Fet
- Žiedlapėliai putokšlio (Milkwort Petals) for voice and viola (1916); words by Konstantin Balmont
- Daina (Song) for voice and viola (published 1924); words by Percy Bysshe Shelley
- To for voice and viola (published 1924); words by Percy Bysshe Shelley
- 2 Romances after Alexander Pushkin, Op.7 (published 1924)
