= Čiurlionis (disambiguation) =

Čiurlionis was a Lithuanian painter, composer and writer

- Čiurlionis may also refer to:
- Čiurlionis (surname)
- Čiurlionis Airport, Vilnius, Lithuania
- Asteroid 2420 Čiurlionis
- National M. K. Čiurlionis School of Art, Vilnius, Lithuania
- M. K. Čiurlionis National Art Museum, Kaunas, Lithuania
- M. K. Čiurlionis Bridge, Kaunas, Lithuania
- Čiurlionis Mountain, Hooker Island, Franz Josef Land, Russia
