= List of things named after Mikalojus Konstantinas Čiurlionis =

The following things have been named after Mikalojus Konstantinas Čiurlionis:

- Vilnius Čiurlionis International Airport since 2025 previously Vilnius Airport
- 2420 Čiurlionis
- M. K. Čiurlionis Bridge
- M. K. Čiurlionis National Art Museum
- National M. K. Čiurlionis School of Art
- Čiurlionis Mountain (Russian: Гора Чурляниса), a basalt mountain by the Tikhaya Bay at the Hooker Island, Franz Josef Land, Russia.
- Čiurlionis Peak: In 1964, Lithuanian alpinists climbed several peaks of the Pamir Mountains in Tajik SSR and named the first one (5794 m) Čiurlionis Peak (Lithuanian: Čiurlionio viršūnė) under the suggestion of a team member, pianist Aleksandras Jurgelionis. While this name is well-known to Lithuanian mountaineers, it is typically not listed on the maps or in non-Lithuanian sources about Tajikistan.
