= Varėna Eldership =

Varėna Eldership Varėnos seniūnija
- Eldership
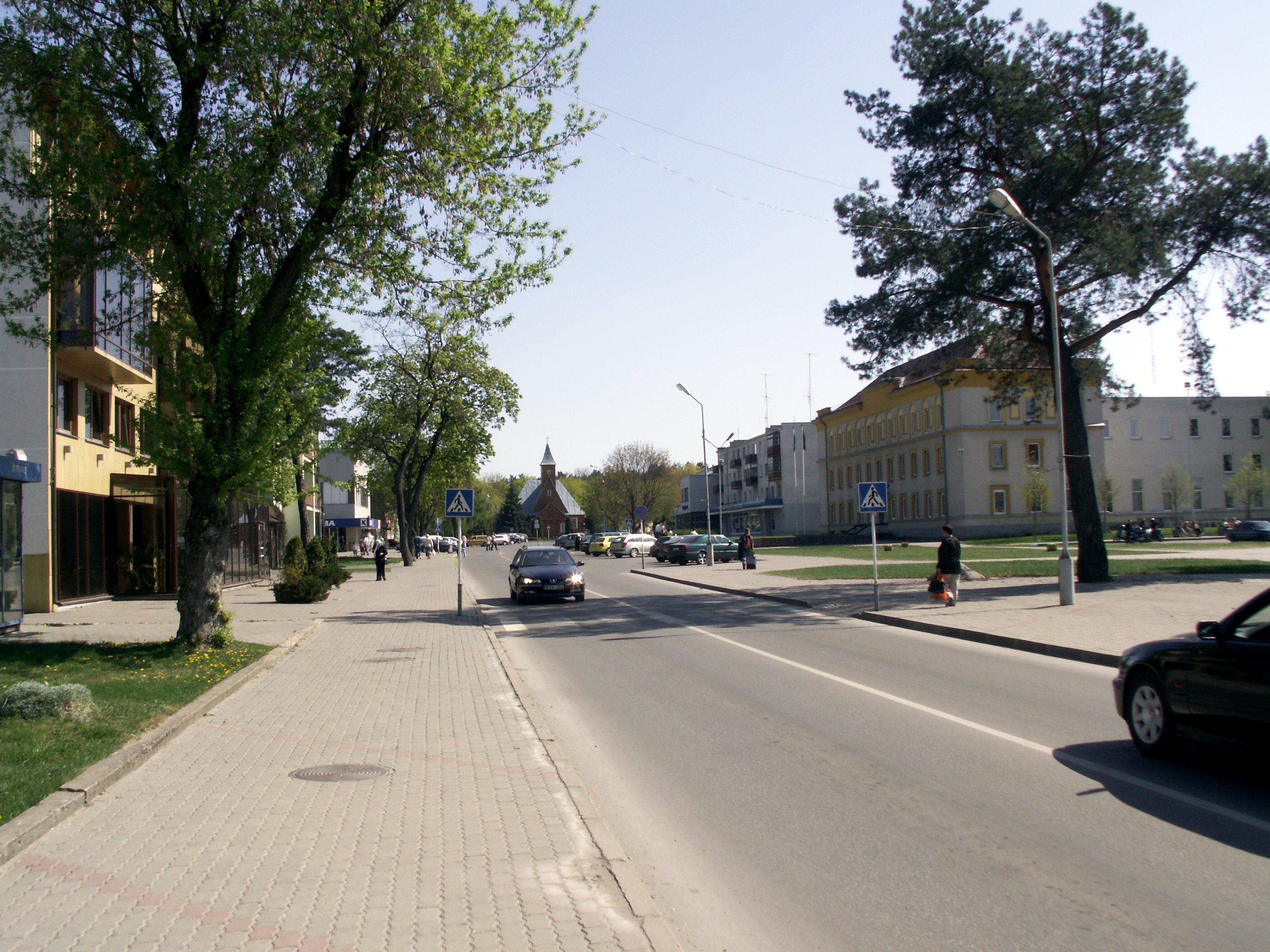
- Street in Varėna

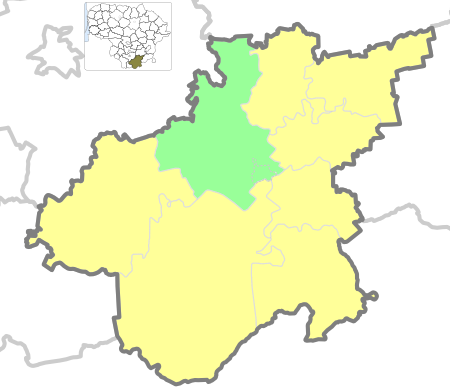
- Location of Varėna Eldership
- Coordinates: 54.297°N 24.470°E
- Country: Lithuania
- Ethnographic region: Dzūkija
- County: Alytus County
- Municipality: Varėna District Municipality
- Administrative centre: Varėna

Area
  - Total: 350 km^{2} (140 sq mi)

Population (2021)
  - Total: 11,084
  - Density: 32/km^{2} (82/sq mi)
- Time zone: UTC+2 (EET)
  - Summer (DST): UTC+3 (EEST)

Varėna Eldership (Lithuanian: Varėnos seniūnija) is a Lithuanian eldership, located in the northern part of Varėna District Municipality.
