= Mad to Be Normal =

- Theatrical release poster
- Directed by: Robert Mullan
- Written by: Robert Mullan; Tracy Moreton
- Produced by: Charlotte Arden; Peter Gerard Dunphy; Phin Glynn
- Starring: David Tennant; Elisabeth Moss; Gabriel Byrne; Michael Gambon; David Bamber; Olivia Poulet; Trevor White
- Cinematography: Ali Asad
- Edited by: Laurie Yule
- Music by: Laurie Yule
- Production companies: Gizmo Films; Bad Penny Productions; GSP Studios
- Distributed by: GSP Studios International
- Release dates: 26 February 2017 (Glasgow Film Festival); 6 April 2017 (United Kingdom)
- Running time: 106 minutes
- Country: United Kingdom
- Language: English

Mad to Be Normal is a 2017 British drama film directed by Robert Mullan and written by Robert Mullan and Tracy Moreton. The film stars David Tennant, Elisabeth Moss, Gabriel Byrne, Michael Gambon, David Bamber, Olivia Poulet and Trevor White. The film was released on 6 April 2017 by GSP Studios International.

== Plot ==
The film portrays the story of Scottish psychiatrist R. D. Laing. Working out of Kingsley Hall in East London throughout the 1960s and 1970s, Laing performed various experiments on people diagnosed as mentally disturbed. His unconventional methods included a form of self-healing known as metanoia, causing controversy in the medical profession and later radically changing perceptions of mental health around the world.

== Cast ==
- David Tennant as R. D. Laing
- Elisabeth Moss as Angie Wood
- Gabriel Byrne as Jim
- Michael Gambon as Sydney Kotok
- David Bamber as Dr. Meredith
- Olivia Poulet as Maria
- Trevor White as Bryan
- Rebecca Gethings as Jane Simons
- Nigel Barber as Dr. Bloom
- Caitlin Innes Edwards as Mrs. Kotok
- Adam Paul Harvey as Paul Zemmell
- Jerome Holder as John Holding
- Kelby Keenan as Olivia Kennan
- James Utechin as Sam
- Helen Belbin as Amelia
- Lydia Orange as Sarah
- Matthew Jure as Richard Long
- Jamie Edgerton as Barman
- Darren Whitfield as Cockney
- Alex Walton as Sean
- Tom Richards as Raymond
- Linda Hargreaves as Mrs. Holding
- Isaac Benn as R. D.Laing as a Child
- Aaron Taylor as Pieter Kotok
- Alexandra Finnie as Suzie Laing
- Declan Wilson as Mr. Holding
- Lanna Joffrey as Eleanor Goodhart
- Maya Chesca Miles as Fran Klein
- Sam Booth as Alex
- Richard Calder as RCP Chairman
- Lucie Glynn as Joan
- Ruby Winter as Karen Laing
- Cia Allan as Mrs. Walker
- Redford Glynn as Baby Gabriel
- Wendy Barrett as Anne Laing
- Peter F. Gardiner as David Laing
- Nicola Kemp-Simonds as Nina

== Release ==
The film premiered at the Glasgow Film Festival on 26 February 2017. The film was released on 6 April 2017 by GSP Studios International.

== Reception ==
On review aggregator website Rotten Tomatoes, the film holds an approval rating of 61% based on 23 reviews, and an average rating of 5.7/10.
