= Senoji Varėna =

- Village
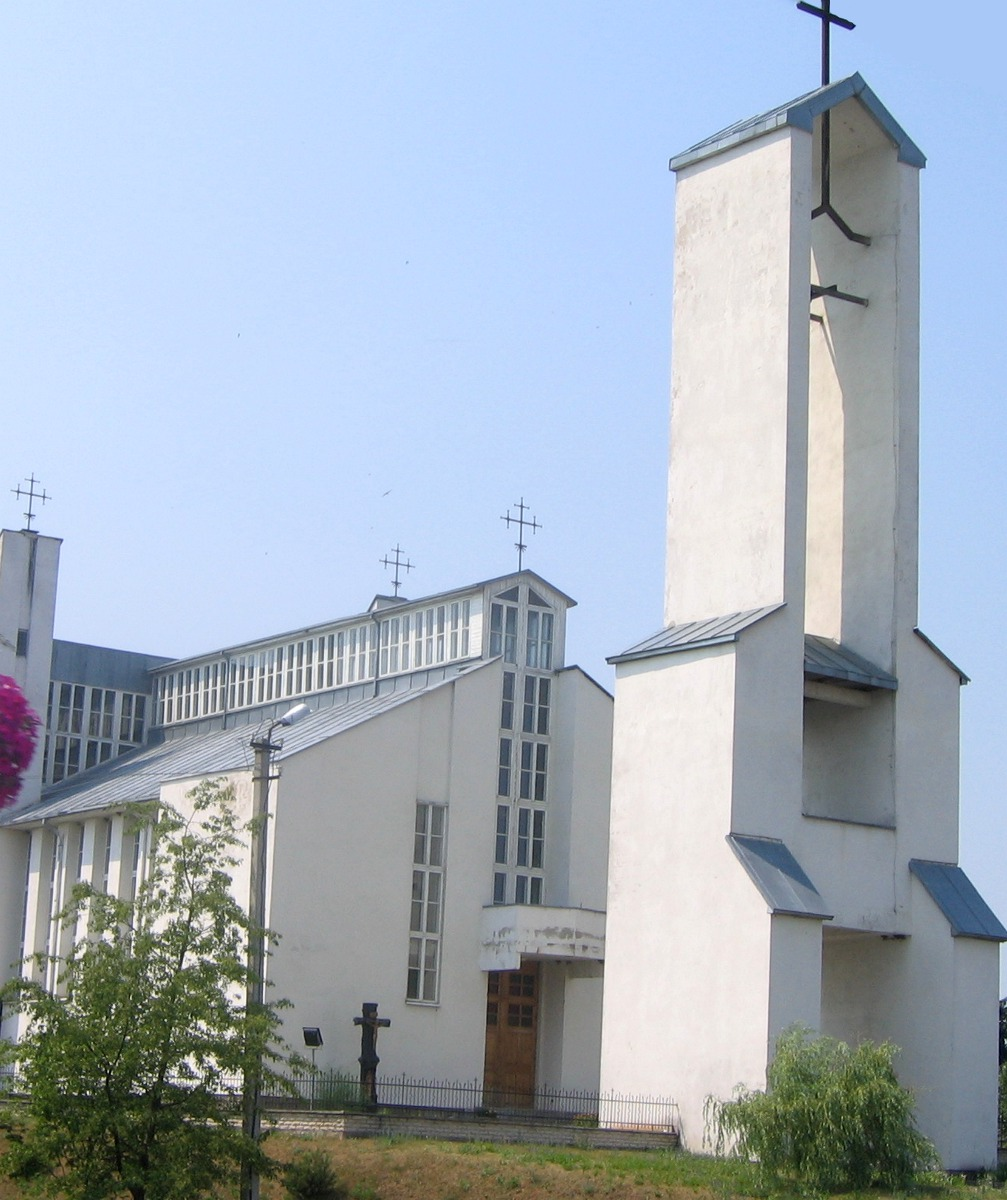
- Church of St. Michael the Archangel in Senoji Varėna

- Location of Senoji Varėna
- Coordinates: 54°15′N 24°33′E
- Country: Lithuania
- Ethnographic region: Dzūkija
- County: Alytus County
- Municipality: Varėna district municipality
- Eldership: Varėna eldership
- First mentioned: 1413

Population (2021)
  - Total: 1,073
- Time zone: UTC+2 (EET)
  - Summer (DST): UTC+3 (EEST)

Senoji Varėna is an old village in Varėna district municipality, in southern Lithuania, near Merkys River and Rivulet Varėnė confluence, 4 kilometers north of Varėna, on the road Vilnius–Druskininkai.

== Name origins ==
The village name comes from the Varėnė river which goes through it. There is a legend in folk stories that name Varėna comes from goddess Varėnė who was taking care of hunters and fishermen living by the river.

== History ==
The village was mentioned for the first time in Teutonic letters in the year 1413. During the rule of Władysław II Jagiełło, it was the location of a ducal residence, and in 1416 Władysław sent letters from the settlement to Grand Master of the Teutonic Order Michael Küchmeister von Sternberg.

In the 17th century, the town was built by starost Brzostowski.

It was the hometown of the most famous Lithuanian painter and composer Mikalojus Konstantinas Čiurlionis.
