= Čiurlionis (surname) =

- Lithuanian surname
- m.: Čiurlionis
- f.: (unmarried): Čiurlionytė
- f.: (married): Čiurlionienė

Čiurlionis is a Lithuanian-language surname. Notable people with this surname include:

- Mikalojus Konstantinas Čiurlionis (1875–1911), Lithuanian painter, composer and writer
- Sofija Kymantaitė-Čiurlionienė (1886–1958), Lithuanian writer, activist, literary and art critic, playwright, poet, and translator
- Danutė Čiurlionytė-Zubovienė (1910–1995), Lithuanian writer and translator, Righteous among the Nations
