= Letters to Sofija =

- Film poster
- Lithuanian: Laiškai Sofijai
- Directed by: Robert Mullan
- Produced by: Peter Dunphy (as Peter Gerard Dunphy)
- Starring: Rokas Zubovas; Marija Korenkaitė
- Music by: Mikalojus Konstantinas Čiurlionis
- Release date: 30 August 2013
- Running time: 130 minutes
- Country: Lithuania
- Language: Lithuanian

Letters to Sofija (Lithuanian: Laiškai Sofijai) is a 2013 Lithuanian biographical film about the life of Mikalojus Konstantinas Čiurlionis.

== Cast ==
- Rokas Zubovas as Mikalojus Konstantinas Čiurlionis
- Marija Korenkaitė as Sofija Kymantaitė
- Saulius Balandis as Prince Michał Ogiński
- Gediminas Storpirštis as Orator
