= Rokas Zubovas =

Lithuanian pianist

Rokas Zubovas (born 31 July 1966) is a Lithuanian pianist.

While still a student at the Lithuanian Academy of Music, Zubovas won the VI Inter-Republical Čiurlionis competition, ex-aequo with Moldovan pianist Ina Chatipova. He continued his studies in Switzerland and the USA, where he was a teacher at Chicago's Saint Xavier University's Department of Music starting from 1994, a position he combined with the first stages of his international concert career. Six years later he returned to his homeland, where he was appointed a teacher at the Lithuanian Academy of Music. He is known for his dedication to the music of Mikalojus K. Čiurlionis, who was his great-grandfather. In the biographical film Letters to Sofija, he played the role of Čiurlionis.
