= Varėna =

- City
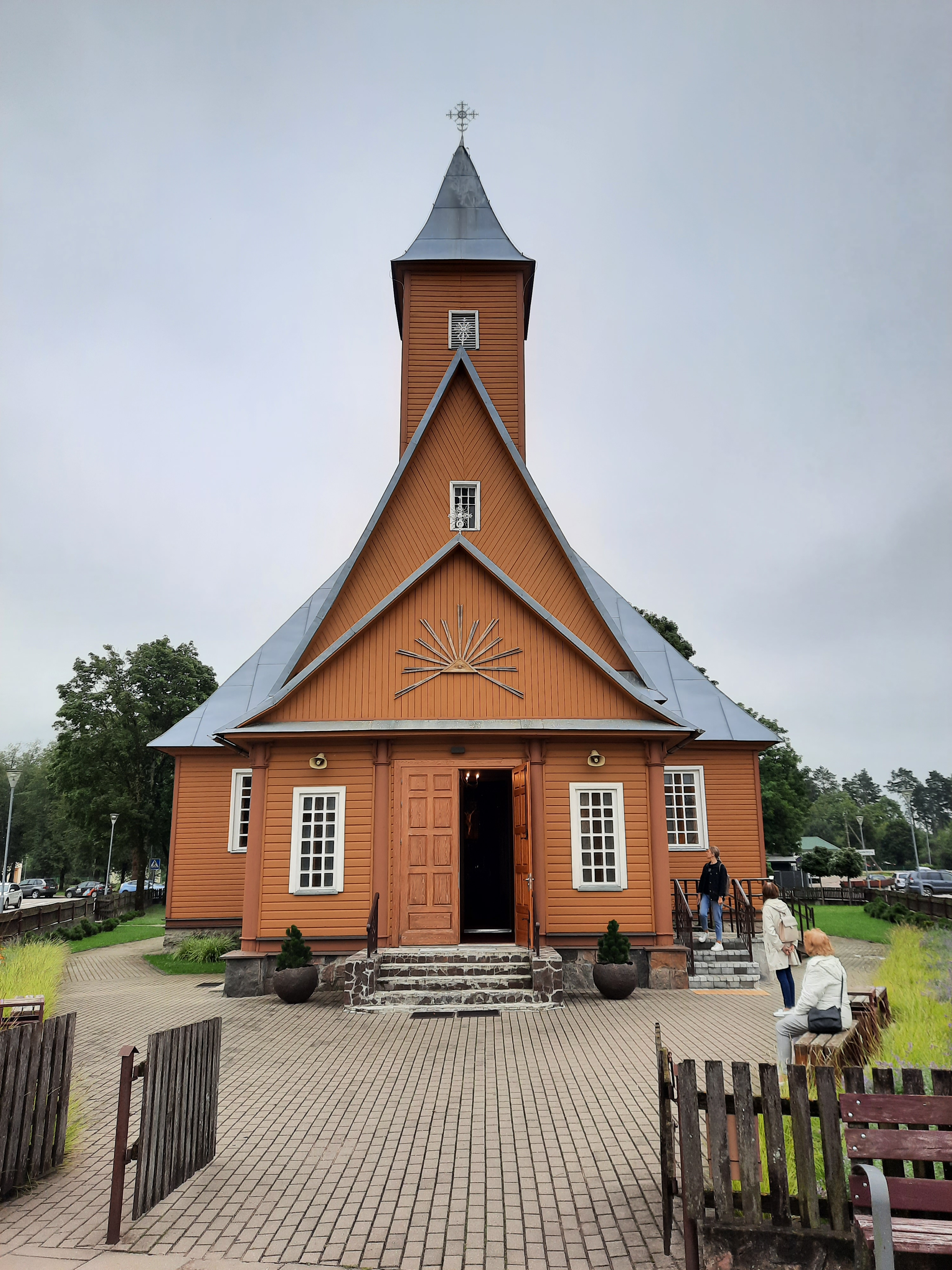
- Central street with a clock Varėna District Municipality Building Church of St. Michael the Archangel Varėna Railway Station Varėna Public Library with a M. K. Čiurlionis painting Town clock

- Flag Coat of arms Brandmark

- Location of Varėna
- Coordinates: 54°12′40″N 24°34′20″E
- Country: Lithuania
- Ethnographic region: Dzūkija
- County: Alytus County
- Municipality: Varėna district municipality
- Capital of: Varėna district municipality Varėna eldership
- First mentioned: 1377
- Granted town rights: 1946

Area
  - Total: 12 km^{2} (4.6 sq mi)

Population (2024)
  - Total: 7,794
  - Density: 650/km^{2} (1,700/sq mi)
- Time zone: UTC+2 (EET)
  - Summer (DST): UTC+3 (EEST)

Varėna is a city in Dzūkija, southern Lithuania. It is the capital of the district of Varėna. Currently, there are 7,794 residents. The Varėna district is the largest and most forested municipality of Lithuania as more than 50% of the district's territory is covered with forests.

== Etymology ==
The name of the town comes from an old village - Senoji Varėna (at the time called simply Varėna), while the new, present Varėna was being established nearby. The place name itself comes from the name of the Varėnė River. In other languages, the town is referred to as: Polish: Orany; German: Warnen; Yiddish: אוראַן Oran.

== History ==
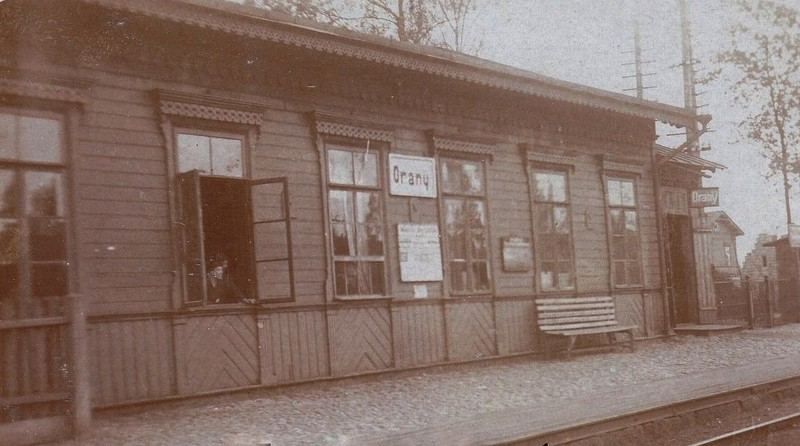
Railway station during World War I

Varėna was founded in 1862 as a railway town of the Warsaw – Saint Petersburg Railway, 4 km (2.5 mi) south of Sena Varėna (Old Varėna). The exact date of the town's foundation is considered to be 5 September 1862 according to the Julian calendar, or 17 September according to the current Gregorian calendar: that's when the first train arrived at the Varėna station. At that time, it was a small settlement, but following steady development, it eventually became the center of the district. In the interwar period, after World War I, the town was in a territorial dispute between Lithuania and Poland. Following Zeligowski Mutiny, together with the Vilnius Region it was annexed by Poland under its Polish name Orany. It was located near the then Polish-Lithuanian border and incorporated into the Wilno and Troki County of the Wilno Voivodeship. The Lithuanian-majority residents of the town persistently opposed the Polish authorities, particularly in regard to the ban on church services in Lithuanian.

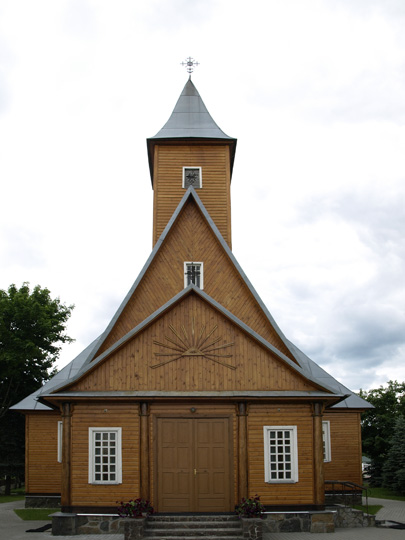
Church of St. Michael the Archangel

In 1939, following the German-Soviet Invasion of Poland, Varėna was briefly returned to Lithuania, but soon, from 1940, it was occupied by the Soviet Union, and from 1941 it was occupied by Nazi Germany. In 1941, the Germans operated the Dulag 112 prisoner-of-war camp in the town, before its relocation to Mołodeczno. On September 9, 1942, all the Jews of the town of Varėna were collected in the local synagogue. On that day, even though the Germans had tried to prevent him from doing so, the Lithuanian priest Jonas Gylys entered the synagogue and encouraged the Jews to be brave in their last hours rather than convert to Christianity.

On the following day (or, according to another source, on the 9th itself) all of the Jews were taken from the synagogue to Ežeriekai - a grove of trees near the village of Druckūnai, 1.5 kilometres (0.9 miles) from the town, on the side of the road leading to the village. Two large pits had been dug there 25 metres (82 feet) apart, one for the men and one for the women. Germans forced the victims in groups toward the pits and shot them there.

According to the report of Karl Jaeger, commander of Einsatzkommando 3A, 831 Jews from Varėna (and the surrounding areas) – 541 men, 149 women, and 141 children – were killed on that day.

In 1944, the town was re-occupied by the Soviet Union, eventually annexed from Poland in 1945 and once again returned to Lithuania. The town became a center of Varėna County (Varėnos apskritis). In 1946 around 2,000 Poles were repatriated to Poland.

In the aftermath of World War II, Lithuanian partisans of the Dainava military district were operating in the area. In 1946, Varėna was granted city rights. Following industrialization in the 1970s, the town grew rapidly. In 1995, the coat of arms of Varėna was formally adopted through a decree from the President of Lithuania.

== Climate ==
Climate data for Varėna (1991–2020 normals)
Month	Jan	Feb	Mar	Apr	May	Jun	Jul	Aug	Sep	Oct	Nov	Dec	Year
Mean daily maximum °C (°F)	−0.9 (30.4)	0.4 (32.7)	5.5 (41.9)	13.5 (56.3)	19.3 (66.7)	22.6 (72.7)	24.6 (76.3)	23.9 (75.0)	18.3 (64.9)	11.1 (52.0)	4.7 (40.5)	0.5 (32.9)	12.0 (53.5)
Daily mean °C (°F)	−3.4 (25.9)	−2.7 (27.1)	0.9 (33.6)	7.3 (45.1)	12.7 (54.9)	16.3 (61.3)	18.4 (65.1)	17.4 (63.3)	12.3 (54.1)	6.9 (44.4)	2.3 (36.1)	−1.7 (28.9)	7.2 (45.0)
Mean daily minimum °C (°F)	−6.1 (21.0)	−5.7 (21.7)	−3.3 (26.1)	1.2 (34.2)	5.8 (42.4)	9.8 (49.6)	12.3 (54.1)	11.1 (52.0)	7.1 (44.8)	3.1 (37.6)	0.0 (32.0)	−4.0 (24.8)	2.6 (36.7)
Average precipitation mm (inches)	51 (2.0)	43 (1.7)	41 (1.6)	42 (1.7)	61 (2.4)	65 (2.6)	88 (3.5)	80 (3.1)	54 (2.1)	59 (2.3)	49 (1.9)	54 (2.1)	687 (27)
Average relative humidity (%)	87	84	78	70	70	72	75	76	81	84	88	89	79
Source: Lithuanian Hydrometeorological Service

== Twin towns ==
Varėna is twinned with:

- Mikołajki, Poland
