= Robert Mullan =

British film director, writer and producer

- Born: 11 December 1947
- Died: 19 September 2024; Exeter
- Occupations: Film director, writer and producer
- Notable work: Letters to Sofija

Robert Mullan was a British film director, author, writer and producer. He wrote and directed Letters to Sofija, Gitel and We Will Sing. He produced over 40 documentaries, for the BBC, Granada, Anglia Television, Channel4 and for broadcasters outside the UK.

His last film was Mad to Be Normal, a biography of R. D. Laing with David Tennant in the lead role.

== Books ==
- Mad to be Normal: Conversations with R.D. Laing (1995) as Bob Mullan ISBN 1853433950
- R.D.Laing: A Personal View (1999) as Bob Mullan ISBN 0715628895
- Therapists on Therapy (1996) Edited by Bob Mullan ISBN 1853433314
