= Čiurlionis Mountain =

Mountain in Russia

The Čiurlionis Mountain (Russian: Гора Чурляниса) is a basalt mountain plateau by the Tikhaya Bay at the Hooker Island, Franz Josef Land, Russia.

In 1957, Aalenian deposits over the Upper Jurassic deposits were reported at the mountain.

== Name ==
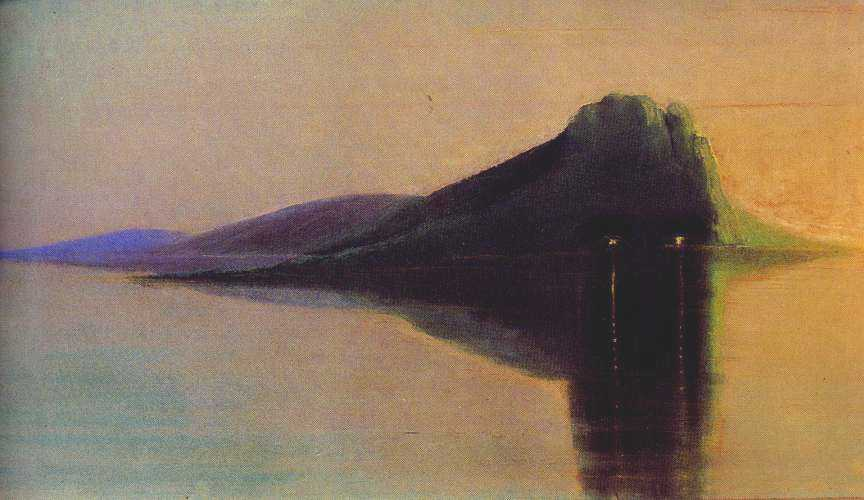
Stillness by M.K. Čiurlionis, a possible inspiration for the name of the mountain

The memoirs of polar explorer and artist Nikolay Pinegin who saw the area when he was taking part in a 1913 polar expedition of Georgy Sedov say: "On the foggy days when we saw these headlands, they resembled the visions of the fantasy painter Čiurlionis". Latter writers attributed the naming to Pinegin. A member of another expedition to the area, Vyacheslav Alekseyevich Markin, published a photo in his book, from which it can be concluded that the inspiration was the painting Stillness by Čiurlionis. Vyacheslav Markin suggests the name of the bay, "Tikhaya" ("Still, "Quiet") was inspired by the name of the painting.

Later the mountain was split into two objects: its plateau foothills were named Čiurlionis Plateau (плато Чюрлениса) and its iceberg-covered dome was called Čiurlionis Dome (купол Чюрлениса).

The Russian-language name ("Гора Чурляниса", "Gora Churlyanisa") reflects the archaic Russian transliteration of the artist's name. During 1959-1961 the Čiurlionis Dome hosted a meteorological station (no. A-009) with the same name.
