= M. K. Čiurlionis Bridge =

Lithuanian 's bridge

Coordinates: 54°52′56″N 23°55′26″E

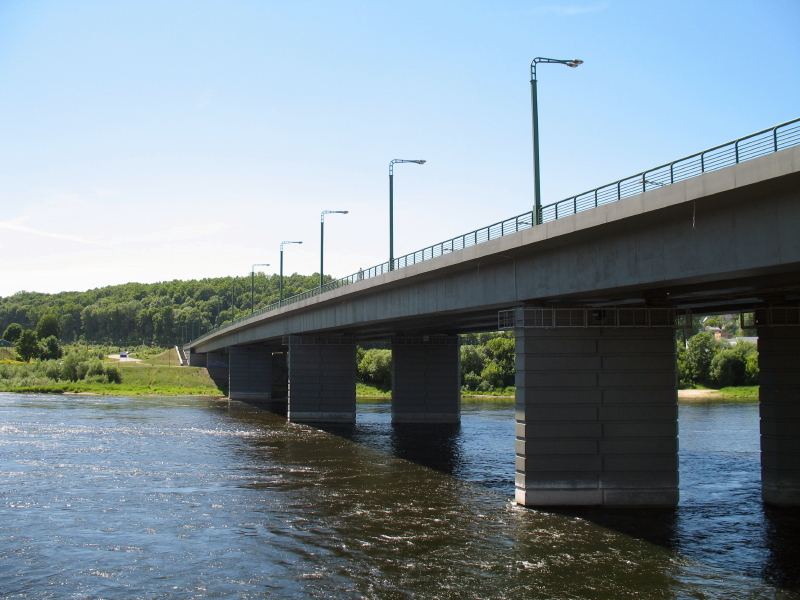
M. K. Čiurlionis Bridge

M. K. Čiurlionis Bridge is a bridge in Kaunas, Lithuania. It crosses the Nemunas River to connect Freda (Aleksotas district) and Kaunas City center. The bridge is 475 meters in length and 29.4 meters in width. It carries six lanes of automobile traffic, with three lanes in each direction. The bridge, completed in 2002, is named after a prominent Lithuanian painter Mikalojus Konstantinas Čiurlionis.
