= 2420 Čiurlionis =

Main-belt asteroid

Discovery
- Discovered by: N. Chernykh
- Discovery site: Crimean Astrophysical Obs.
- Discovery date: 3 October 1975

Designations
- Named after: Mikalojus Čiurlionis (painter and composer)
- Alternative designations: 1975 TN · 1979 QF
- Minor planet category: main-belt · Eunomia

Orbital characteristics
- Epoch 4 September 2017 (JD 2458000.5)
- Uncertainty parameter 0
- Observation arc: 41.42 yr (15,129 days)
- Aphelion: 2.9008 AU
- Perihelion: 2.2190 AU
- Semi-major axis: 2.5599 AU
- Eccentricity: 0.1332
- Orbital period (sidereal): 4.10 yr (1,496 days)
- Mean anomaly: 56.325°
- Mean motion: 0° 14^{m} 26.16^{s} / day
- Inclination: 14.611°
- Longitude of ascending node: 205.64°
- Argument of perihelion: 197.83°

Physical characteristics
- Dimensions: 8.444±0.198 km 10.06 km (calculated)
- Synodic rotation period: 12.84 h 15.760±0.002 h
- Geometric albedo: 0.21 (assumed); 0.327±0.086
- Spectral type: S
- Absolute magnitude (H): 12.2 · 12.28±0.28 · 12.3

2420 Čiurlionis, provisionally designated 1975 TN, is a stony Eunomian asteroid from the central regions of the asteroid belt, approximately 9 kilometers in diameter. It was discovered on 3 October 1975, by Soviet astronomer Nikolai Chernykh at the Crimean Astrophysical Observatory in Nauchnij, on the Crimean peninsula, and later named after Lithuanian painter and composer Mikalojus Čiurlionis.

== Orbit and classification ==
Čiurlionis is a member of the Eunomia family, a large group of S-type asteroids and the most prominent family in the intermediate main-belt. It orbits the Sun at a distance of 2.2–2.9 AU once every 4 years and 1 month (1,496 days). Its orbit has an eccentricity of 0.13 and an inclination of 15° with respect to the ecliptic.

== Physical characteristics ==
=== Lightcurves ===
Two rotational lightcurves of Čiurlionis were obtained from photometric observations. Lightcurve analysis gave a rotation period of 12.84 and 15.760 hours with a brightness amplitude of 0.48 and 0.51 magnitude, respectively (U=2/3-).

=== Diameter and albedo ===
According to the survey carried out by the NEOWISE mission of NASA's Wide-field Infrared Survey Explorer, Čiurlionis measures 8.444 kilometers in diameter and its surface has an albedo of 0.327. The Collaborative Asteroid Lightcurve Link assumes an albedo of 0.21 – derived from 15 Eunomia, the family's largest member and namesake – and calculates a diameter of 10.06 kilometers based on an absolute magnitude of 12.3.

== Naming ==
This minor planet was named after Lithuanian Art Nouveau painter and composer Mikalojus Konstantinas Čiurlionis (1875–1911). The approved naming citation was published by the Minor Planet Center on 17 February 1984 (M.P.C. 8542).
