= Mikalojus Konstantinas Čiurlionis =

Lithuanian painter, composer and writer (1875–1911)

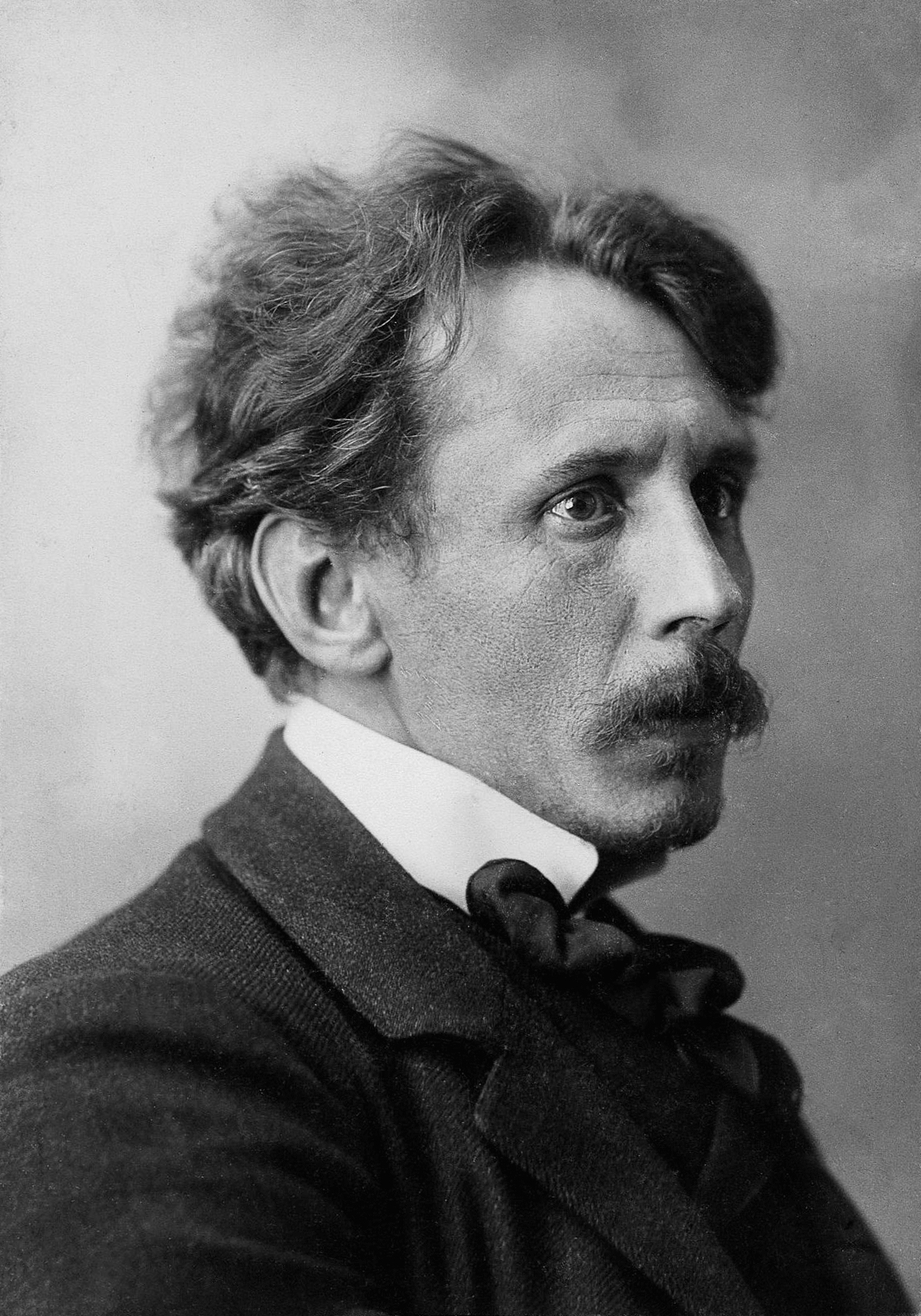
- Born: 22 September 1875; Senoji Varėna, Lithuania (then part of the Russian Empire)
- Died: 10 April 1911 (aged 35); Marki, Congress Poland
- Education: Warsaw Conservatory; Leipzig Conservatory; Warsaw School of Fine Arts
- Known for: Painting, music composition
- Notable work: Spring Sonata; In the Forest
- Movement: Symbolism; Art Nouveau
- Spouse: Sofija Kymantaitė-Čiurlionienė (m. 1909)

Mikalojus Konstantinas Čiurlionis (Polish: Mikołaj Konstanty Czurlanis; 22 September [O.S. 10 September] 1875 – 10 April [O.S. 28 March] 1911) was a Lithuanian composer, painter, choirmaster, cultural figure, and writer in Polish.

Čiurlionis contributed to symbolism and Art Nouveau, and was representative of the fin de siècle epoch. He has been considered one of the pioneers of abstract art in Europe. During his short life, he composed about 400 pieces of music and created about 300 paintings, as well as many literary works and poems. The majority of his paintings are housed in the M. K. Čiurlionis National Art Museum in Kaunas, Lithuania. His works have had a profound influence on modern Lithuanian culture.

== Biography ==
=== Childhood and early music studies ===
Mikalojus Konstantinas Čiurlionis was born in Senoji Varėna, a town in southeastern Lithuania which at the time was part of the Russian Empire. His mother Adelė (Adelaidė) Ona Marija Magdalena née Radmanaitė (Radmann) (1854-1919) came from a Lutheran family of Bavarian origin, born in Vileikiai village (Lazdijai region). She finished elementary school in Seirijai. Orphaned at the age of 14, she worked as a nanny in Count Oppermann's estate in Aniškis. His father, Konstantinas Čiurlionis (1851-1914, born in Guobiniai) was an organist and a choirmaster who briefly played the organ in Liškiava, where the couple met.

The newly formed family moved to Senoji Varėna, where their eldest child, Mikalojus, was born. There were nine siblings altogether: Mikalojus Konstantinas (1875-1911), Marija (1879-1969), Juzė (1882-1969), Povilas (1884-1945), Stasys (1887-1944), Petras (1890-1924), Jonas (1891-1955), Valerija (1896-1955), and Jadvyga (1898-1992).

Even though Čiurlionis' family spoke Polish, Mikalojus Konstantinas could understand and read Lithuanian, albeit not fluently, receiving assistance from his fiancée from 1907 onwards.

In 1878, his family moved to Druskininkai, 30 miles (48 km) away, where his father went on to serve as the town organist. This is where Mikalojus Konstantinas, called Konstantinas or Kastukas by the family, started publicly displaying his musical proficiency - he was a musical prodigy: he could play by ear at the age of five and could sight-read music freely by the age of seven. He would often fill in for his father playing the organ at Mass, while he played piano at home. A family friend, doctor Jozef Markiewicz noticed his natural talent and, upon Mikalojus' graduation from the folk school of Druskininkai, wrote a letter to the Lithuanian noble Michał Mikołaj Ogiński recommending to enrol M. K. Čiurlionis to the Palace Orchestra School in Plungė.

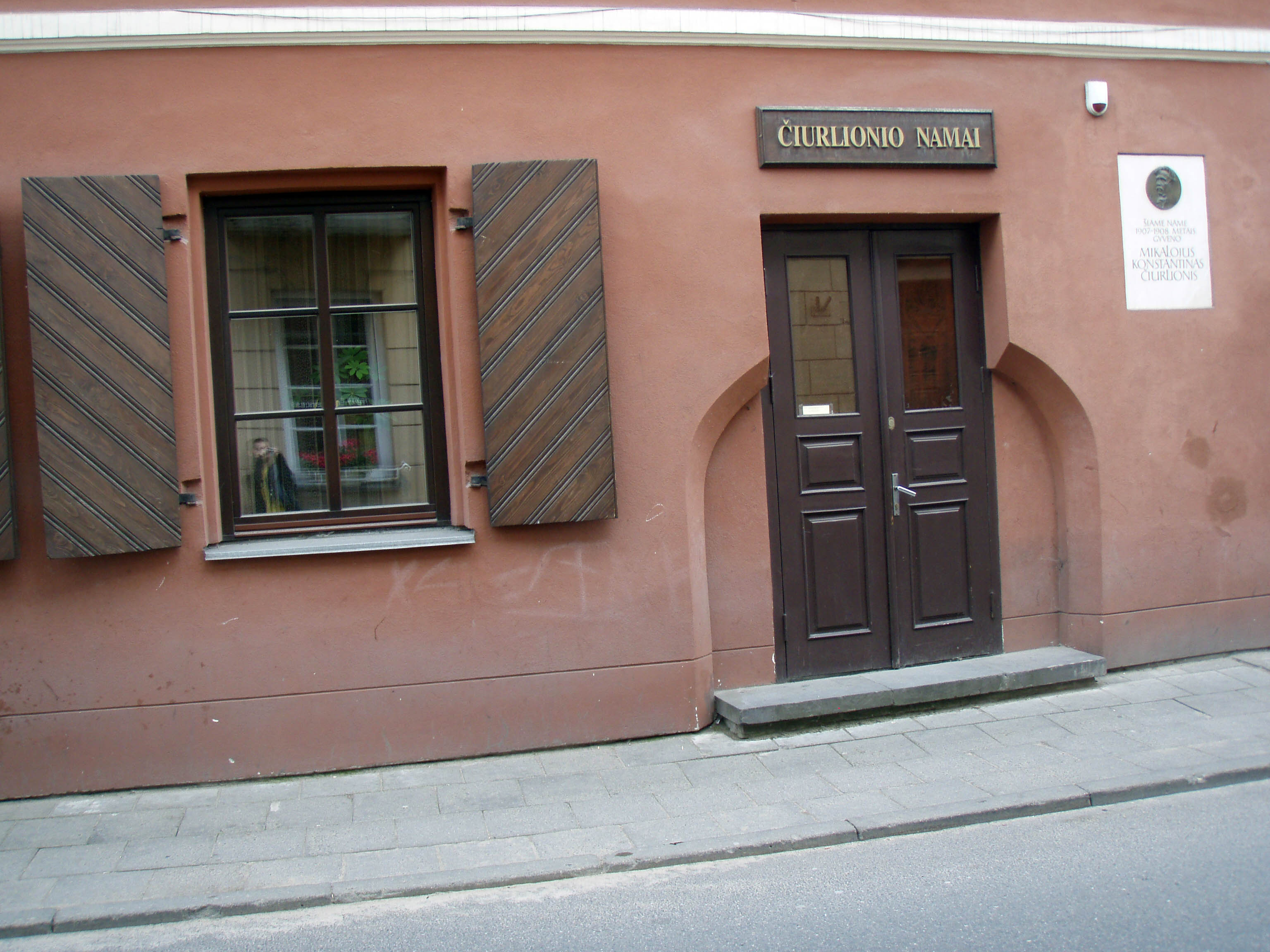
A house in Vilnius where Mikalojus Konstantinas Čiurlionis lived, which now hosts a museum of M. K. Čiurlionis

M. K. Čiurlionis studied in the Plungė Palace Orchestra School from 1889 to 1893. Here he played the flute, received his first orchestra uniform and musical theory basics. He would often travel with the orchestra to play concerts in Rietavas, Palanga, Riga. He had a close relationship with M. Ogiński, who granted him a scholarship which allowed the composer to study in Warsaw.

=== Life abroad ===
Supported by Prince Ogiński's scholarship Čiurlionis studied piano and composition at Warsaw Institute of Music from 1894 to 1899. He studied piano with the guidance of Antoni Sygietyński, and composition with the guidance of the composer Zygmunt Noskowski. Here he met the future Polish composer and director of the Warsaw Conservatory Eugeniusz Morawski-Dąbrowa. Together they discussed music and paintings, critiqued each other's compositions, and went on vacation at Morawski's parents' place in Zakroczym. Here he met his friend's sister Maria Morawska. Her father, after noticing the love of his young daughter for the - at the time unknown - artist, intervened and married Maria off to a widower. M. K. Čiurlionis buried himself in work: he wrote preludes, fugues, canons, and cycles of variations for the piano. For his graduation, in 1899, he wrote a cantata for mixed chorus and symphonic orchestra titled De Profundis, and received the diploma for composition. He declined the offer to become the orchestra master for Lublin's Music Society Choir and continued creating - in 1900 he finished his first symphonic poem "In the Forest", which was dedicated to E. Morawski.

After receiving the approval and further scholarship from M. Ogiński, M. K. Čiurlionis enrolled at the Leipzig Conservatory from 16 October 1901 until 14 July 1902. There he was taught composition, his main subject, by Carl Reinecke, counterpoint by Salomon Jadassohn and music theory by Emil Paul, as well as organ by Paul Homeyer and piano by Carl Heinrich Heynsen. Though he was not proficient in German, he still enrolled in aesthetics, history, and psychology classes. It is apparent from letters that M. K. Čiurlionis felt very lonely in Leipzig and wanted to come back to Druskininkai; he constantly wrote letters to his family and E. Morawski.

As he was in Leipzig, he listened to and studied the works of G. F. Haendel, P. Tchaikovsky, R. Wagner, F. Liszt, H. Berlioz, and R. Strauss, and created the symphonic overture "Kęstutis". Since he couldn't come back home, he started drawing during his free time. The sudden death of M. Ogiński and disrupted financial support made it harder to finish his studies, but he succeeded in receiving the teacher's license from Leipzig's Conservatory.

=== Interest in painting ===
M. K. Čiurlionis returned to Warsaw in 1902 and joined the Warsaw Drawing School where he was taught drawing by Jan Kauzik. As he was living in Warsaw, he had to work as a private music tutor to support himself and his brothers, who were also studying in Warsaw. With the strong decision to paint, he refused to teach at Warsaw's Institute of Music. In 1903, he painted the 7-painting cycle "Funeral Symphony", but also did not forget music: he started creating his second symphonic poem "The Sea".

He continued his painting studies in Warsaw School of Fine Arts from 1904 to 1906. His main teacher in Warsaw was symbolist painter Kazimierz Stabrowski, who was also the founder of the first lodges of the Theosophical Society in Poland and passed to Čiurlionis an interest in Theosophy and other esoteric subjects. In the School he was taught drawing by Karol Tichy and Konrad Krzyżanowski, sculpture by Xawery Dunikowski, painting by Ferdynand Ruszczyc, and went to the organized plein-air sessions. In 1904 he showed 19 of his works (stained glass projects, cycle of 6 paintings "The Storm", book covers) in the private exhibition of the School. In 1905 M. K. Čiurlionis held an exhibition where he showed the 10-painting cycle "Fantasies"; in the same year he also participated in the first annual exhibition of Warsaw School of Arts.

As he was working as a private music tutor, he acquainted himself with the family of Wolmans, who quickly became his friends. He had an especially warm relationship with Bronisława Wolman, who sponsored M. K. Čiurlionis' painting. As a thank you, M. K. Čiurlionis gifted her numerous paintings including "Friendship" (1906/1907). In 1905 B. Wolman invited M. K. Čiurlionis with a couple of his friends to the resort town of Anapa, near the Black Sea. Here M. K. Čiurlionis traveled the Caucasus, painted, photographed, and searched for inspiration.

B. Wolman gave M. K. Čiurlionis money for his trip through Europe: he went to Prague, Dresden, Nuremberg, Munich, Vienna; the artist adored the works of Van Dyck, Rembrandt, Böcklin. In 1906 he showed his works in the exhibition of Warsaw's School of Fine Arts in Saint Petersburg (the cycles "Creation of the World", "Day", "The Storm" and other creations). Articles started appearing in the press about M. K. Čiurlionis, the first Lithuanian article was in "Vilniaus žinios" (no. 123).

=== Dedication to Lithuania ===
In 1906, M. K. Čiurlionis wrote to his brother Povilas: "I am going to dedicate all of my previous and future work to Lithuania". As he received the invitation to participate in the First Exhibition of Lithuanian Art in 1907 at Vileišis Palace, Vilnius, he sent his paintings (33 paintings shown), and also helped organize it. Soon after this event, the Lithuanian Art Society was founded, and Čiurlionis was one of its 19 founding members.

In 1907 M. K. Čiurlionis moved to Vilnius, where he lived on 11 Savičiaus Street, and actively involved himself in culture: he was elected to the board of Lithuanian Art Society, was the choirmaster of the choir "Vilniaus kanklės". During his visit to the dress rehearsal of "Blinda" by Gabrielius Landsbergis-Žemkalnis he met the writer Sofija Kymantaitė (1886–1958). Together with her and the Lithuanian Art Society they prepared the Second Exhibition of Lithuanian Art and discussed the creation of "Folk Palace" (art museum).

Together with Sofija (fiancée) they went to Palanga in 1908, and on 1 January 1909 they got married, later visiting Sofija's parents in Kuliai, Karklėnai, Sofija's uncle in Plungė, stayed in Druskininkai.

=== Fight for recognition and death ===
Trying to become more known, M. K. Čiurlionis followed his friends' advice and left for Saint Petersburg in 1908. Here he met Mstislav Dobuzhinsky, who introduced the Lithuanian artist to the Russian Artist Society. To have enough money, he had to once again become a private music tutor. While in Saint Petersburg, M. K. Čiurlionis did not forget Lithuania: he proposed creating a music section at the Lithuanian Art Society, sent harmonized folk songs to the "Vilniaus kanklės" choir, and, together with Sofija, wrote music for their opera "Jūratė".

In 1909, after their wedding and parent visits, the newlyweds came to Saint Petersburg. Here M. K. Čiurlionis' paintings were exhibited in "Salon" exhibition, in the Sixth Exhibition of Russian Artist Society, among them – his newest painting – "Rex" (1909). A few of his paintings he also sent to the First Spring Exhibition of Vilnius Artist Society, to the Thirteenth Art Lover Society "Sztuka" Exhibition in Kraków. In March, 1909, Sofija and M. K. Čiurlionis came back to Lithuania, where they helped organize the Third Art Exhibition of Lithuanian Art, painted the "Rūta" Society hall curtain, and wrote the critique essay book In Lithuania. At the end of the year, M. K. Čiurlionis left for Saint Petersburg again.

Constant work without breaks, and material deprivations, tired out M. K. Čiurlionis - Sofija found him acting strangely on Christmas Eve and brought him to the neuropathologist and psychiatrist V. Bechterev, who diagnosed him with burnout. In 1910 the pair came back to Druskininkai. Later on M. K. Čiurlionis was hospitalized in a health resort "Czerwony Dwór" (Red Manor) in Marki, Poland, northeast of Warsaw. While he was recovering, his only daughter – Danutė – was born. In 1911, he went for a walk and caught pneumonia, eventually dying on 10 April 1911 at 35 years of age. He was buried at the Rasos Cemetery in Vilnius. He never saw his daughter Danutė (1910–1995).

Čiurlionis felt that he was a synesthete; that is, he perceived colours and music simultaneously. Many of his paintings bear the names of musical pieces: sonatas, fugues, and preludes.

== M. K. Čiurlionis as a composer ==
M. K. Čiurlionis is the originator of Lithuanian professional music. The precise number of Čiurlionis' musical compositions is not known – a substantial part of his manuscripts did not survive, including those that perished in the fire during the war. The ones available for us today include sketches, rough drafts, and fragments of his musical ideas. The nature of the archive determined the fact that Čiurlionis' works were finally published only a hundred years after the composer's death. Today, the archive amounts to almost 400 compositions, the major part of which are works for piano (around 200), but also significant opuses for symphony orchestra (symphonic poems "In the Forest" and "The Sea", symphonic overture "Kęstutis", cantata for choir and orchestra "De Profundis"), string quartet, fugue "Kyrie", works like "Sanctus", "Agnus Dei", "Let's not be sad" ("Neliūskime"), works for various choirs (original compositions and Lithuanian folk song arrangements (around 40)), as well as works for organ.

In 1909 his collection book of harmonized Lithuanian folk songs "Vieversėlis" was published in Warsaw. M. K. Čiurlionis' harmonized folk songs like "Dawning dawn" ("Beauštanti aušrelė"), "Oh It Goes, It Goes" ("Oi lekia, lekia"), "Dad Will Dance" ("Šoks tėvelis suktinį"), and "Promised So Far" ("Taip toli žadėta") were played/sung in Lithuanian song festivals in Chicago (USA) and Toronto (Canada).

Together with Kazimieras Būga, Augustinas Voldemaras, Česlovas Sasnauskas, J. Tallat-Kelpša, M. K.Čiurlionis prepared the Lithuanian music terminology dictionary "Our music terminology" ("Mūsų muzikos terminologija") in 1909.

Some of his most-performed musical works include:

=== Orchestral ===
- Miške (In the Forest), symphonic poem for orchestra (1901; published posthumously)
- Kęstutis, Symphonic Overture (1902; piano score survives, orchestrated by Robertas Šervenikas)
- Jūra (The Sea), symphonic poem for orchestra (1907; published posthumously)
- Pasaulio sutvėrimas (The Creation of the World), Symphonic Poem (c. 1907; reconstructed by Arvydas Malcys)
- Dies Irae, Symphonic Poem (c. 1910, reconstructed by Giedrius Kuprevičius)

=== Choral ===
- Folk songs for choir
- De Profundis, for choir and orchestra

=== Chamber music ===
- String Quartet in C minor

=== Piano ===
- Nocturne in C♯ minor
- Prelude in B♭ minor
- Prelude in F♯ major
- Nocturne in F minor
- Impromptu in F♯ minor
- Prelude in A major
- Prelude in D♭ major
- Fugue in B minor
- Karalaitės kelionė: Pasaka (The Princess's Journey: A Fairy Tale)

=== Organ ===
- Seven fugues for organ (Fugue in G minor)

== M. K. Čiurlionis as a painter ==
M. K. Čiurlionis started to form late as a painter. Even though it is known that he would paint his surroundings while studying in Plungė in 1893, he started his path as a professional painter only when he was 27 years old, after he joined the Warsaw Drawing School. Later M. K. Čiurlionis said "They did not teach me anything there that I wanted to learn". Already in the first paintings M. K. Čiurlionis' inclination was visible towards symbolism and abstraction, the veil of mysticism and secrecy in creating. He chose the antique painting method with tempera as the art technique with which he was most comfortable. Another characteristic showed M. K. Čiurlionis' attraction to antique art - compositions of cycles, diptychs, triptychs, most common to the art of the Middle Ages. In the first of M. K. Čiurlionis' paintings (from 1903) there is an abundance of fantasy creatures, mystic rulers of the past, traces of Lithuanian pagan culture, elements of cosmogony - Gods, planets, stars, the Sun. These elements accompanied the painter during all of his creative life, receiving more concrete and suggestive forms. From the very beginning, M. K. Čiurlionis felt that the best form to express himself was the cyclical exploration of an idea. And thus such cycles were created as the 7-painting cycle "Funeral symphony" (1903), the 4-painting cycle "Day" (1904, one painting missing), the 5-painting cycle "The Deluge" (1904, one painting missing), triptych "Rex" (1904, not to confuse with the culminative painting "Rex" of 1909), 13-painting cycle "Creation of the World" (1905/6), 3-painting cycle "Sparks" (1906), and the 12-painting cycle "Zodiac" (1906).

The time between 1907 and 1909 was the most mature and productive for M. K. Čiurlionis as a painter. His paintings from this period have clearer, more stylised forms. His 8-painting cycle "Winter" (1907) and triptych "My Road" (1907) are especially mature, verging on the border of abstraction. There are more traces of musical structure in his painting: the 4-painting cycles, repeating the musical sonata structures with parts allegro, andante, scherzo, finale. M. K. Čiurlionis painted 7 sonatas which received their associative names after his death: "Sonata I (Sonata of the Sun)" (1907), "Sonata II (Sonata of the Spring)" (1907), "Sonata no. 3 (Sonata of the Serpent)" (1908), "Sonata no. 4 (Sonata of the Summer)" (1908), "Sonata no. 5 (Sonata of the Sea)" (1908), "Sonata no. 6 (Sonata of the Stars)" (1908), "Sonata no. 7 (Sonata of the Pyramids)" (1909). There are other musical paintings such as the diptych "Prelude and Fugue" (1908), "Prelude. Fugue" (1908), as well as triptych's "Fantasy" (1908) middle part of Fugue.

M. K. Čiurlionis paid a lot of attention to Lithuania's past culture and to the nature of his homeland. When painting, he looked for inspiration in folk art and culture. This can be seen in the landscape triptych "Raigardas" (1907), and also in his fairytale motif full paintings "The Prince's Journey" (1907), triptych "Fairytale" (1907), and we can find ethnographic motif in the painting "Fairytale (Fairytale of the Fortress)" (1909).

One of the most famous of M. K. Čiurlionis painting is "Rex", created in 1909. Here the artist's experience connects with the research of C. Flammarion, Holy Scripture, and Indo-European myths.

Some of the most popular paintings by Mikalojus Konstantinas Čiurlionis include:

- Friendship (1906)
- 8 painting cycle Winter (1906–1907)
- 12 painting cycle The Zodiac (1907)
- 13 painting cycle Creation of the World (1906-1907)
- Spring – four paintings (1907–08)
- 3 painting cycle Summer (1907–08)
- Sonata I (Sonata of the Sun) (1907)
- Sonata II (Sonata of the Spring) (1907)
- Sonata no. 3 (Sonata of the Serpent) (1908)
- Sonata no. 4 (Sonata of the Summer) (1908)
- Sonata no. 5 (Sonata of the Sea) (1908)
- Sonata no. 6 (Sonata of the Stars) (1908)
- Sonata no. 7 (Sonata of the Pyramids) (1908)
- Diptych Prelude and Fugue (1908)
- Triptych Fantasy (1908)
- 3 painting cycle Fairy-Tale (1909)
- Rex (1909)
- Fairytale of the Kings (1908-1909)

== M. K. Čiurlionis as a writer ==
Čiurlionis was also a gifted writer, keeping diaries and writing prose, poems, and verses. He wrote in Polish and was deeply influenced by Polish literature, especially the poetry of Juliusz Słowacki and the poets of the Young Poland movement. A major inspiration for all of Čiurlionis’s literary work was Słowacki’s poem Król-Duch.

He is, however, generally regarded as a writer of the grotesque, In Tomas Venclova’s view, his prose bears some resemblance to that of Franz Kafka. Very little of his literary output has survived, as Čiurlionis did not publish during his lifetime, and most of his manuscripts were lost during World War II. What remains is known mainly from fragmentary and imperfect prewar translations by Jurgis Šlapelis.

Several hundred letters written by Čiurlionis have been preserved, primarily because he used to copy the letters he sent. Most of them were written in Polish, with only five composed in Lithuanian.

One of the few surviving fragments of Čiurlionis’s original literary work, Pamiętniki rekonwalescenta (Memoirs of a Convalescent), is found in a letter to his brother Povilas. Another preserved piece is the cycle known as Listy do Dewduraczka (Letters to Dewduraczek). Also extant in the original are his youthful, folk-stylized song Piosnka (Little Song, incipit: “Hej po Niemnie, po błękitnym…”) and Aforyzmy [o miłości] (Aphorisms [on Love]).

== Posthumous recognition ==
National M. K. Čiurlionis School of Art in Vilnius, Lithuania.

M. K. Čiurlionis National Art Museum in Kaunas, Lithuania.

After Čiurlionis's death in 1911, the Russian critic Valerian Adolfovich Chudovsky (transliterated as Tschoudowsky in English) wrote:

Now that he is dead, the authors of the spiritual revival of Lithuania present Ciurlionis (sic) as a national artist. It is not for us to judge; however his extraordinary independence of all contemporary art leads one to believe that he was really created by the hidden forces of his people; and it is well for us to be able to believe that this singular genius does not merely represent a chance caprice of fate, but is the precursor of a future sublime Lithuanian art. When I think of him, an idea imposes itself on my mind: the Lithuanian people had no Middle Ages, perhaps it has preserved intact until the 20th century, even better than we Russians, the immense energy of mystic life inherited from the Arians which our Western brothers have so prodigally squandered in their Middle Ages.

In 1911, the first posthumous exhibition of Čiurlionis' art was held in Vilnius and Kaunas. During the same year, an exhibition of his art was held in Moscow, and in 1912 his works were exhibited in St. Petersburg.

On 13 January 1913, Čiurlionis division was formed next to Lithuanian Art Society and one of its goals was to accumulate the late painter's works of art. The need to save M. K. Čiurlionis heritage hastened art lovers to take more action in creating the "Folk Palace" - an art museum to house these paintings.

In 1913 with the initiative of Stasys Šilingas and Antanas Žmuidzinavičius, a fund to buy M. K. Čiurlionis' paintings was created. The finances came from donations and the members of Lithuanian Art Society fees.

On 14 December 1921 the law to create M. K. Čiurlionis gallery was passed by the Constituent Assembly of Lithuania. The temporary M. K. Čiurlionis gallery was opened in Kaunas on 13 December 1925 thanks to Paulius Galaunė. On 1 November 1936, the gallery was moved to the newly built Vytautas Magnus Culture Museum palace. In 1944, this art museum was renamed M. K. Čiurlionis State Museum of Arts.

In 1957, the Lithuanian community in Chicago opened the Čiurlionis Art Gallery, hosting collections of his works.

In 1963, the Čiurlionis Memorial Museum was opened in Druskininkai, in the house where Čiurlionis and his family lived. This museum holds biographical documents as well as photographs and reproductions of the artist's works. In 1965, the second Čiurlionis' family home opened up.

In 1964, Lithuanian alpinists climbed several peaks of the Pamir Mountains in Tajikistan and named the first one (5794 m) Čiurlionis Peak (Lithuanian: Čiurlionio viršūnė) at the suggestion of a team member, pianist Aleksandras Jurgelionis.

In 1965, a sculptor, medal creator Juozas Kalinauskas created the M. K. Čiurlionis memorial medal.

The National M. K. Čiurlionis School of Art in Vilnius was named after M. K. Čiurlionis in 1965. It received the National status in 2001.

In 1968 the M. K. Čiurlionis quartet was formed.

In 1969 M. K. Čiurlionis gallery was moved to the annex building (architect Feliksas Vitas) of the museum.

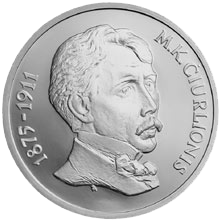
50 litų coin depicting Čiurlionis

Čiurlionis inspired the Lithuanian composer Osvaldas Balakauskas' work Sonata of the Mountains (1975), and every four years junior musical performers from Lithuania and neighboring countries take part in the Čiurlionis Competition.

In 1975 the Crimean astrophysicist Nikolai Chernykh discovered a new asteroid (diameter of 8 km) and named it Čiurlionis asteroid.

In Senoji Varėna, at the place of the house where M. K. Čiurlionis was born there is a memorial rock. From Old Varėna to Druskininkai there is "Čiurlionis route" an alley of 22 oak waycrosses, created by folk craftsmen in 1975-1976.

In 1995 Druskininkai music school was named after M. K. Čiurlionis. The international M. K. Čiurlionis pianist and organ player competitions are held here.

In 1995 M. K. Čiurlionis' home in Vilnius was opened.

In 1997 the M. K. Čiurlionis State Museum of Arts was given the status of a National museum and was renamed to M. K. Čiurlionis National Art Museum; it continues to host the majority of Čiurlionis paintings. Some of Čiurlionis' paintings are also in the Lithuanian National Museum of Art, the Warsaw's National Museum, and the State Russian museum in Saint Petersburg.

Čiurlionis' works have been displayed at international exhibitions in Japan, Germany, Spain, and elsewhere. His paintings were featured at "Visual Music" fest, an homage to synesthesia that included the works of Wassily Kandinsky, James McNeill Whistler, and Paul Klee, at the Museum of Contemporary Art, Los Angeles in 2005.

In 2009, Genovaitė Kazokienė published Musical Paintings, a book where she argued that Theosophy, esotericism and Spiritualism were important influences on Čiurlionis' art.

In 2009 LRT (Lithuanian national television) broadcast 12 documentary episodes, dedicated to M. K. Čiurlionis, called "Code of Čiurlionis", in the series "Signs of Time" (Laiko ženklai). Authors were L. Pociūnienė and P. Savickis.

A commemorative plaque has been placed on the building of the former hospital in Marki, Poland where Mikalojus Konstantinas Čiurlionis died in 1911.

In 2011, to commemorate the 100th anniversary of the artist's death, UNESCO declared the year of M. K. Čiurlionis. The remembrance of M. K. Čiurlionis was celebrated with various events. There was a specific musical note manuscript published in Japan.

Čiurlionis's life was depicted in the 2012 film Letters to Sofija, directed by Robert Mullan.

In 2019 the first national certified cultural route, the "M. K. Čiurlionis route" started its activities. Each year it unites seven regions of Lithuania connected to M. K. Čiurlionis in two main events celebrating M. K. Čiurlionis (topographic week "Lithuania of M. K.Čiurlionis" in May, and M. K. Čiurlionis birthday celebration in September).

== M. K. Čiurlionis' researchers ==
The personality and creations of M. K. Čiurlionis interest not only Lithuanian, but also foreign art researchers. The most famous researchers in Lithuania are his sisters Jadvyga Čiurlionytė and Valerija Čiurlionytė-Karužienė; other famous researchers include Vytautas Landsbergis, Antanas Andrijauskas, and Rasutė Andriušytė-Žukienė. There are many books and articles continuously published.

Books about M. K. Čiurlionis:

- P. Galaunė „M. K. Čiurlionis“ (1938)
- N. Worobiow „M.K. Čiurlionis, der litauische Mahler und Musiker“ (1938)
- V. Čiurlionytė-Karužienė „M. K. Čiurlionis. Apie muziką ir dailę“ (1960)
- J. Čiurlionytė „Atsiminimai apie M. K. Čiurlionį“ (1963)
- A. Savickas, J. Gaudrimas „ M. K. Čiurlionis“ (1965)
- V. Landsbergis compiled „M. K. Čiurlionio laiškai Sofijai“ (1973)
- G. Vaitkūnas „Mikalojus Konstantinas Čiurlionis“ (1975)
- V. Landsbergis „Čiurlionio dailė“ (1976)
- J. Bruveris compiled „Čiurlioniui 100“ (1977)
- V. Landsbergis „Vainikas Čiurlioniui“ (1980)
- R. Aleksis „Mikalojus Konstantinas Čiurlionis Lithuanian Visionary Painter“ (1984)
- S. Yla „M.K.Čiurlionis kūrėjas ir žmogus“ (1984)
- V. Landsbergis „Čiurlionio muzika" (1986)
- V. Landsbergis „M.K.Čiurlionis. Time and Content“ (1992)
- S. Goštautas compiled „Čiurlionis:painter and Composer. Collected essays and Notes, 1906-1989“ (1994)
- S. Fauchereau „Ciurlionis par exemple“ (1996)
- J. Siedlecka „Mikołaj Konstanty Čiurlionis Preludium Warszawskie“ (1996)
- V. Koreškovas „Mikalojus Konstantinas Čiurlionis. Paveikslai, eskizai, mintys“ (1997)
- V. Landsbergis compiled „Žodžio kūryba“ (1997 m.)
- A. Nedzelskis, G. Domin „M.K.Čiurlionis in Leipzig“ (1999)
- V. Strolia „M.K.Čiurlionio diskografija“ (2001)
- D. Kučinskas „M.K.Čiurlionio fortepijoninės muzikos tekstas (genezės aspektas)“ (2004)
- R. Andriušytė-Žukienė „M.K.Čiurlionis: tarp simbolizmo ir modernizmo“ (2004)
- V. B. Pšibilskis compiled „Atsiminimai apie M.K.Čiurlionį“ (2006)
- Collection of articles „Čiurlionio amžius“ (2006)
- E. Giszter „Mikalojus Konstantinas Čiurlionis litewski malarz i kompozytor“ (2006)
- D. Kučinskas „Chronologinis Mikalojaus Konstantino Čiurlionio muzikos katalogas“ (2007)
- V. Landsbergis „Visas Čiurlionis“ (2008)
- R. Okulicz-Kozaryn „Lietuvis tarp karaliaus-dvasios įpėdinių“ (2009)
- G. Kazokas „Musical paintintings. Life and work of M. K. Čiurlionis (1875-1911)“ (2009)
- Collection of articles „Meno idėjų migracija XX a. pradžioje: M. K. Čiurlionio amžininkų kūryba“ (2010)
- R. Janeliauskas „Neatpažinti Mikalojaus Konstantino Čiurlionio muzikos ciklai“ (2010)
- S. Urbonas complied „Čiurlionis Vilniuje“ (2010)
- „M. K. Čiurlionis ir pasaulis“ (2011)
- V. Landsbergis „Mažoji čiurlioniana“ (2011)
- V. Landsbergis „Mikalojus Konstantinas Čiurlionis. Laiškai Sofijai“ (2011)
- G. Daunoravičienė, R. Povilionienė „Mikalojus Konstantinas Čiurlionis (1875-1911): jo laikas ir mūsų laikas“ (2013)
- D. Kamarauskienė „Išėjau su Čiurlioniu. Tuoj grįšiu“ (2014)
- L. Laučkaitė „M. K. Čiurlionis et l‘art lithuanian au debut su XX‘ siecle“ (2016)
- N. Gaidauskienė „Mikalojus Konstantinas Čiurlionis Vilniuje“ (2016)
- M. Pleitaitė, K. Momkus „Šiandien karaliai mums pasakas seka“ (2017)
- N. Gaidauskienė, R. Zubovas „Čiurlionio namai Vilniuje: istorija ir veikla“ (2017)
- R. Okulicz-Kozaryn, N. Adomavičienė, P. Kimbris compiled „Mikalojus Konstantinas Čiurlionis: korespondencija 1892-1906“ (2019)
- J. Šeniavskij „M. K. Čiurlionis ir Sankt Peterburgas“ (2019)
- S. Žvirgždas „M. K. Čiurlionis ir Vilnius“ (2019)
- S. Jastrumskytė compiled „Čiurlionis ir pasaulis. Estetikos ir meno filosofijos tyrinėjimai VI“ (2019)
- M. Mildažytė-Kulikauskienė compiled „Mikalojus Konstantinas Čiurlionis: Piešiniai, kompozicijų eskizai, grafika“ (2020)
- V. Palčinskaitė „Trolis Molis ir Čiurlionis“ (2021)
- A. Andrijauskas „Teosofinės meno filosofijos idėjų atspindžiai Stabrausko ir Čiurlionio tapyboje“ (2021)
- S. Fauchereau „Baltijos šalių menas XIX-XX a.“ (2021)
- B. Mingo „Vilnis“ (2021)
- Ž. Svigaris, L. Ivanova „Sonatiniai M. K. Čiurlionio garsovaizdžiai“ (2022)
- A. Andrijauskas „Čiurlionio orientalizmo metamorfozės“ (2022)
- V. Landsbergis „Debesies laivu: užrašai apie Mikalojų Konstantiną Čiurlionį“ (2022)

To further research on M. K. Čiurlionis each year the conference "Sonatic soundscapes of M. K. Čiurlionis" is held in Druskininkai.

A lot of institutions researching M. K. Čiurlionis are united by the first national certificated cultural route "M. K. Čiurlionis route".

== Gallery ==
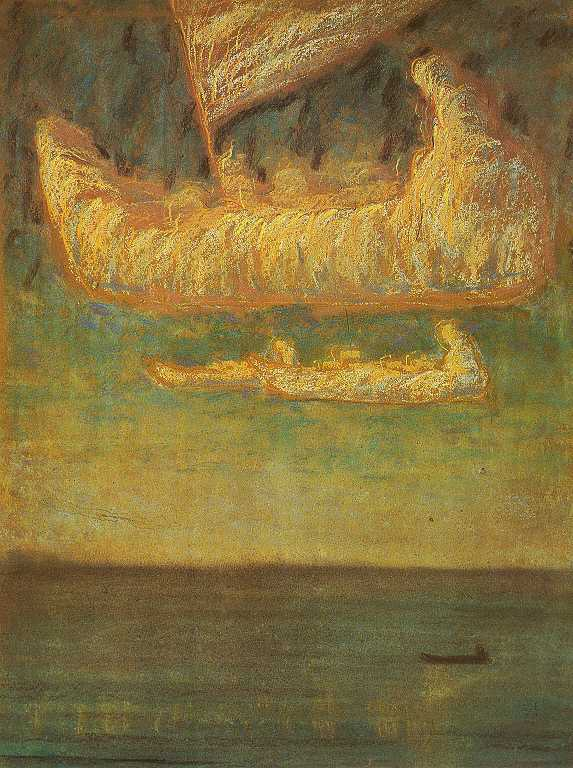
Cloud Boat (1906)

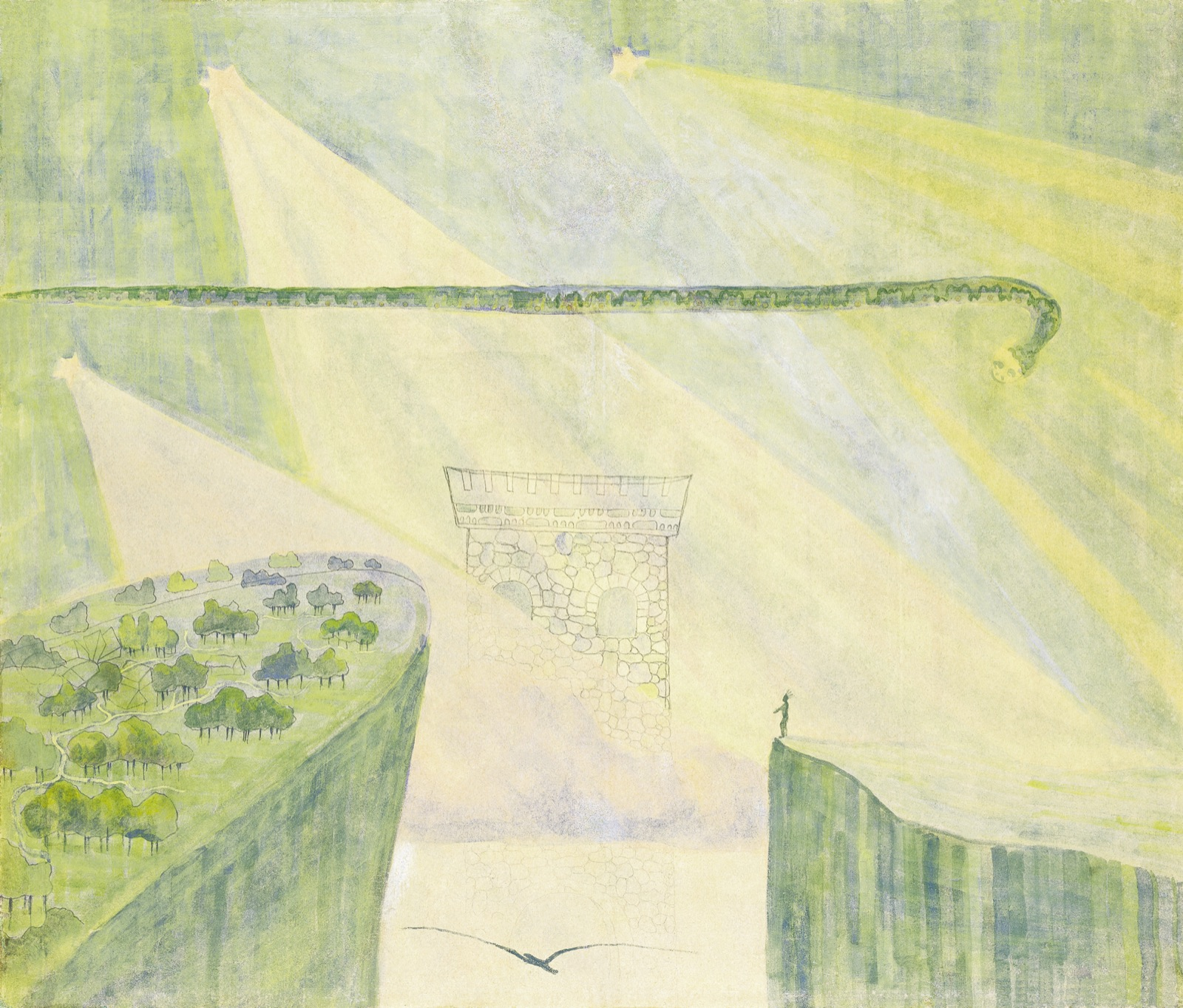
Andante - IV (1908)

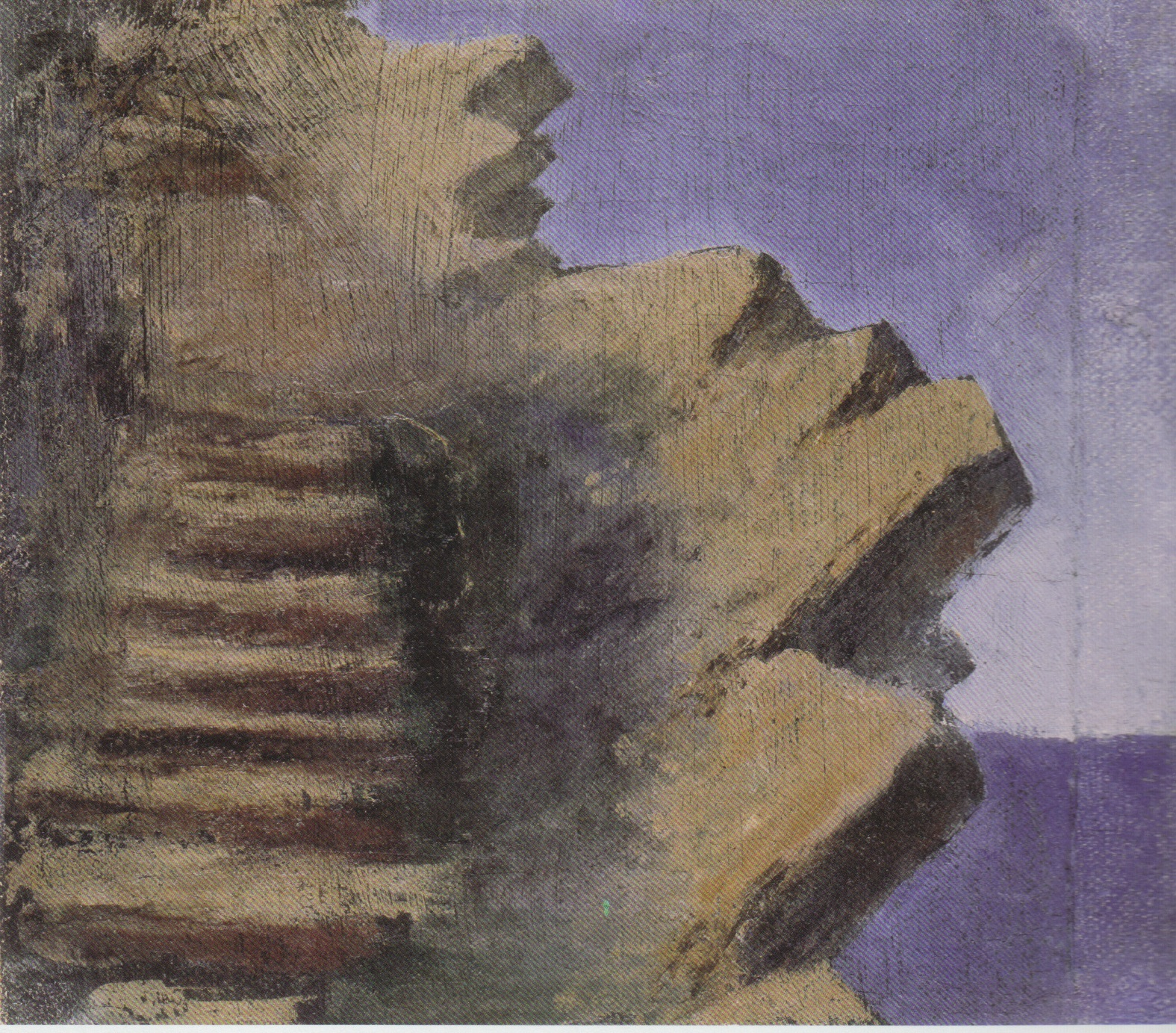
Cliff at the Seaside (1905)

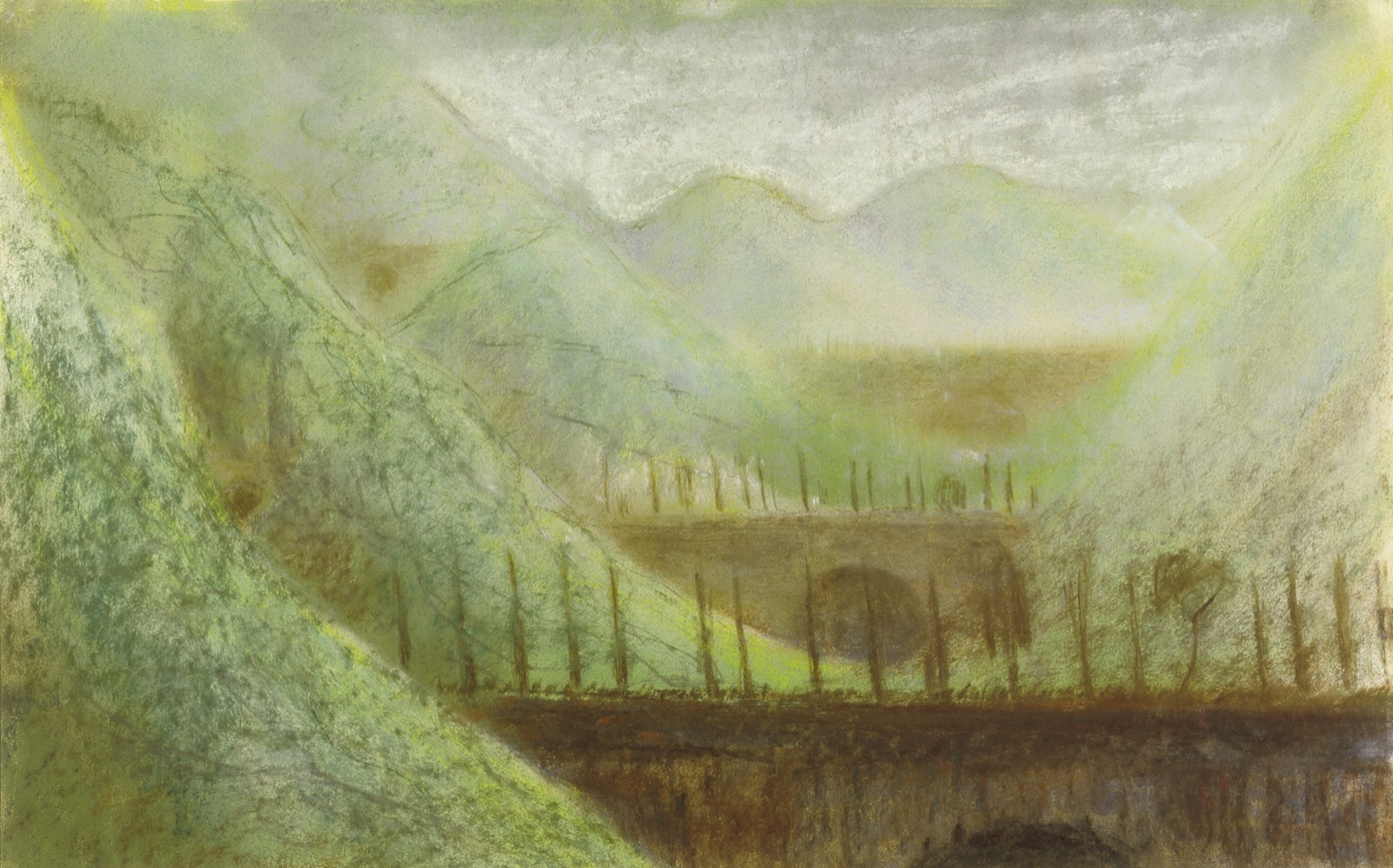
Bridges (1904)

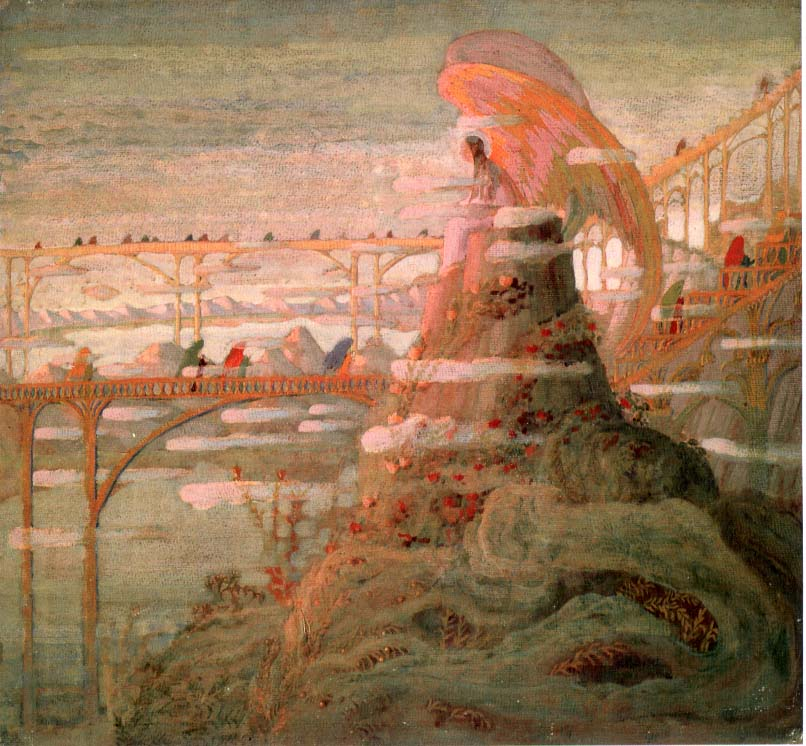
Angel (1908)

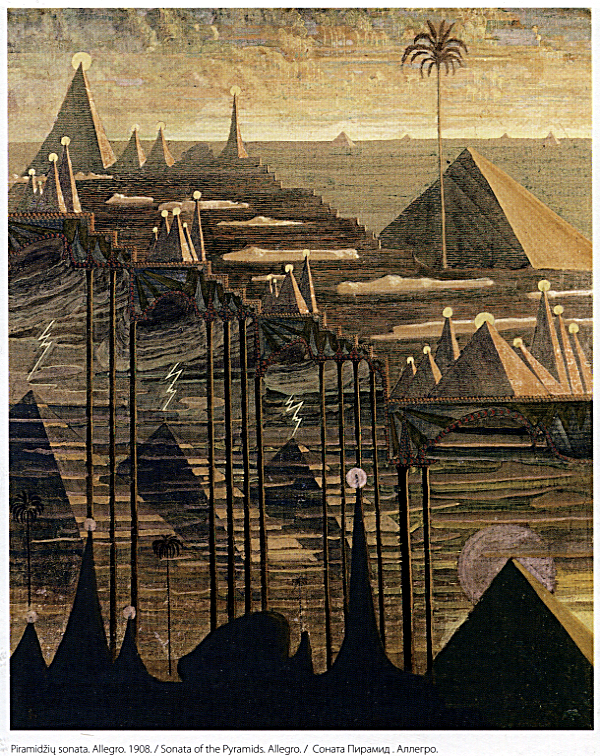
Pyramids (1908)

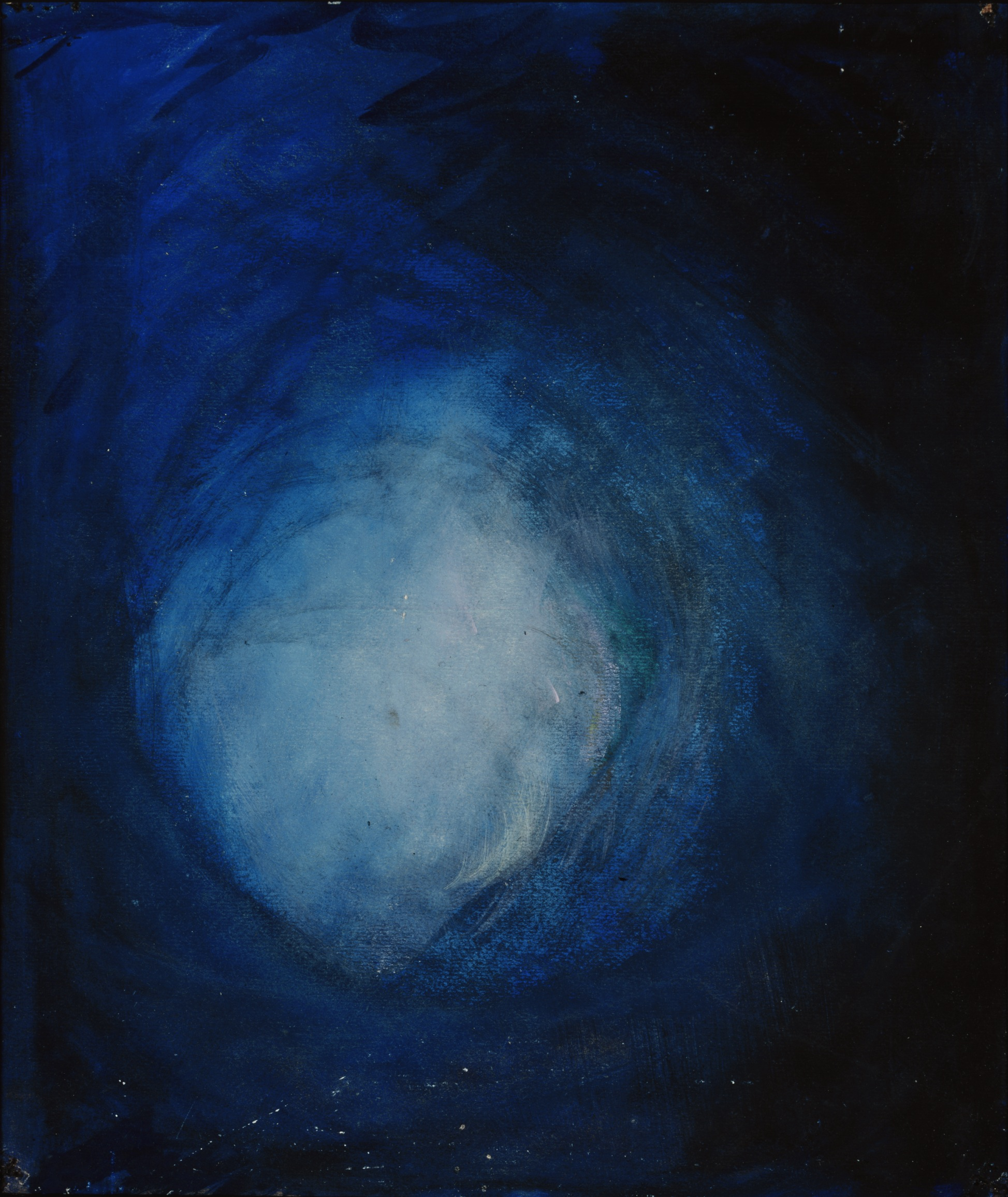
Creation of the World - II (1905–06)

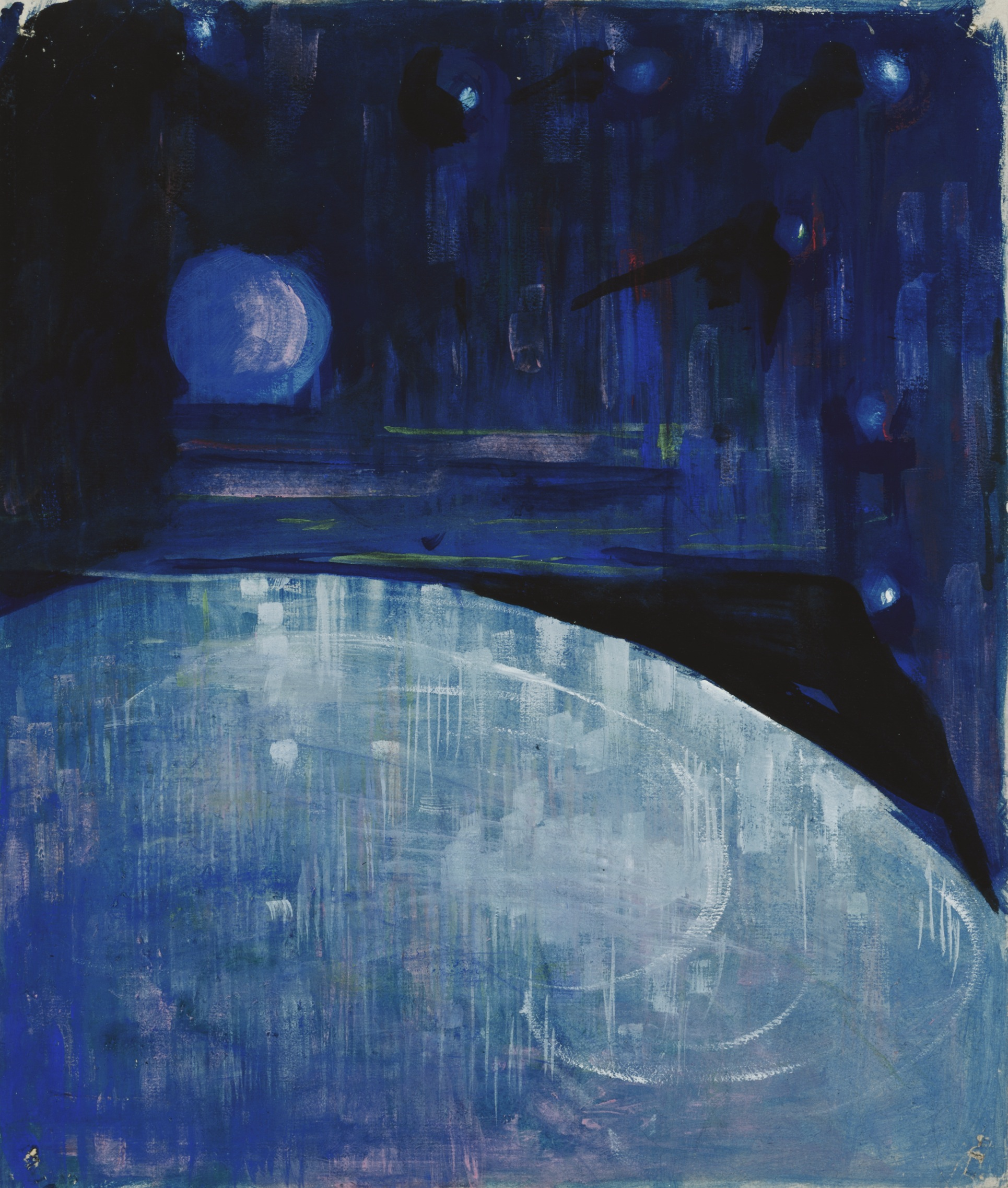
Creation of the World - III (1905–06)

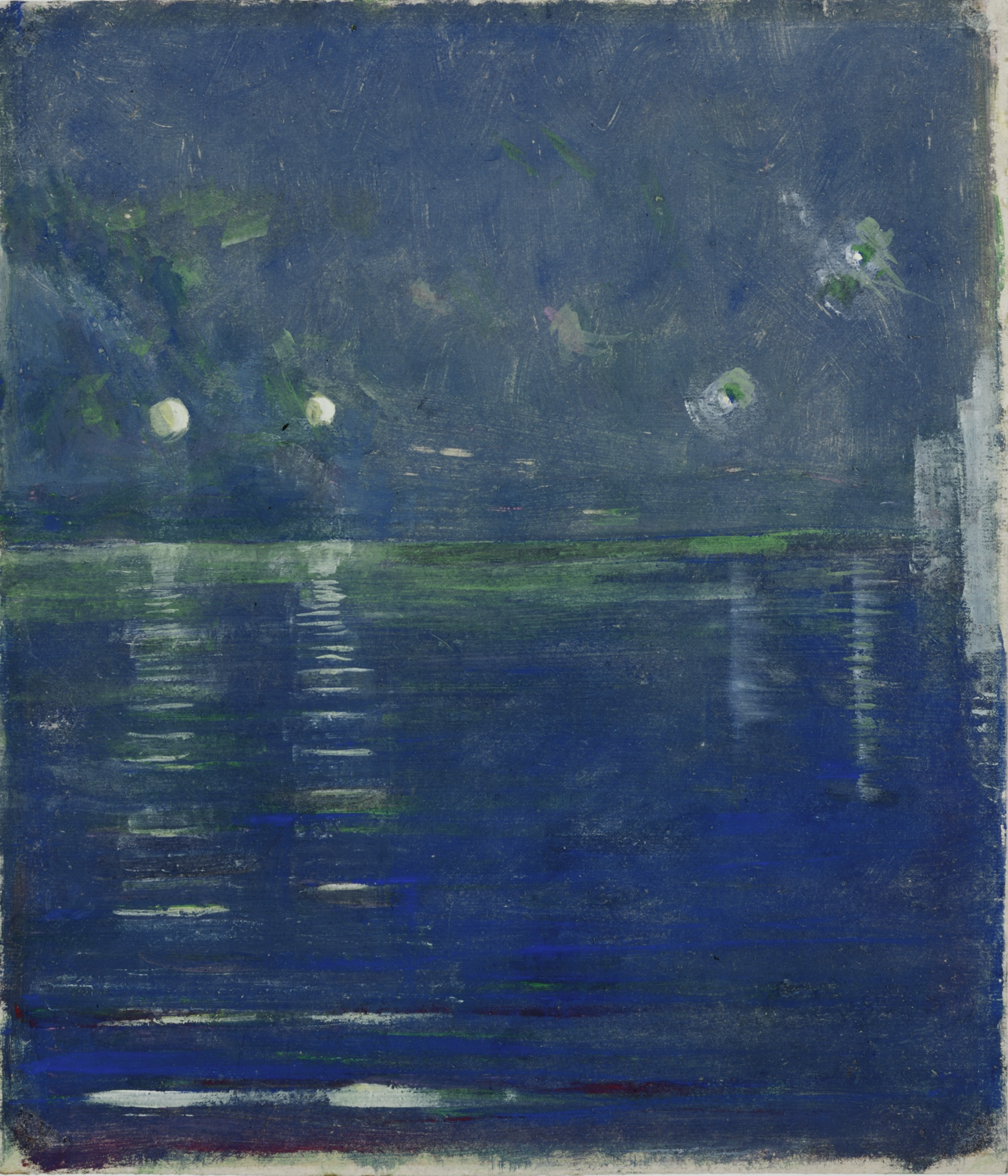
Creation of the World - V (1905)

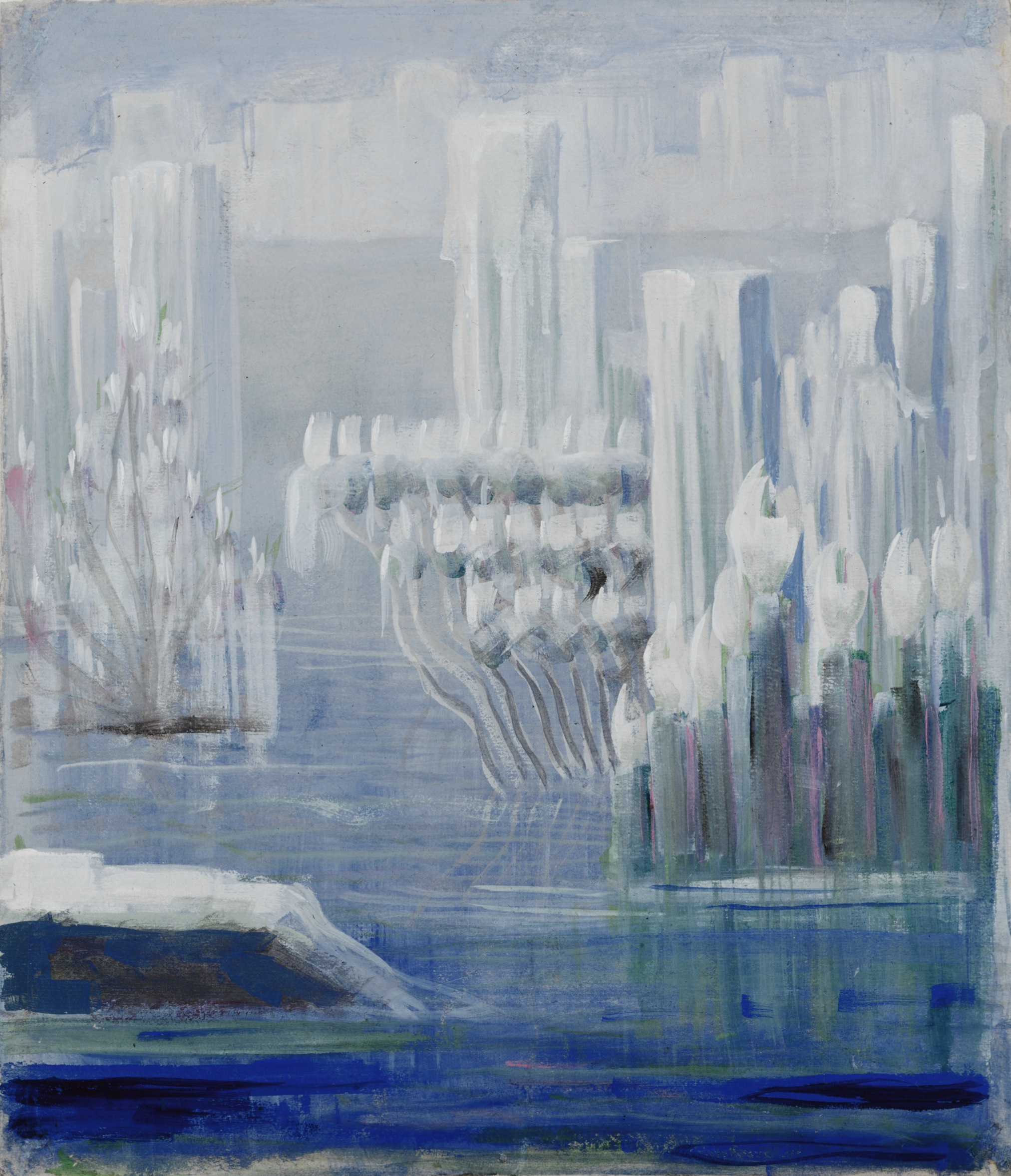
Creation of the World - VI (1905–06)

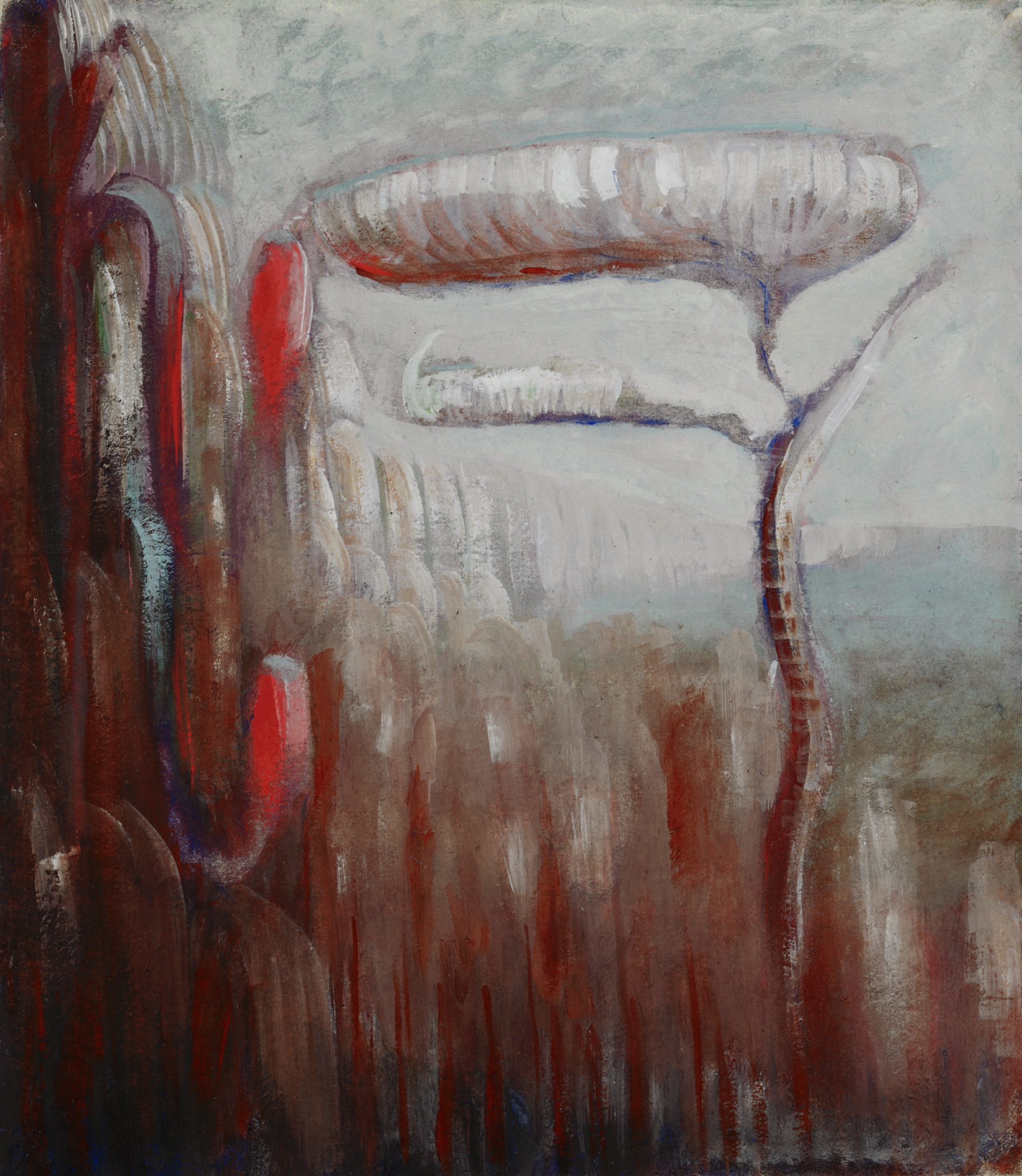
Creation of the World - VII (1905–06)

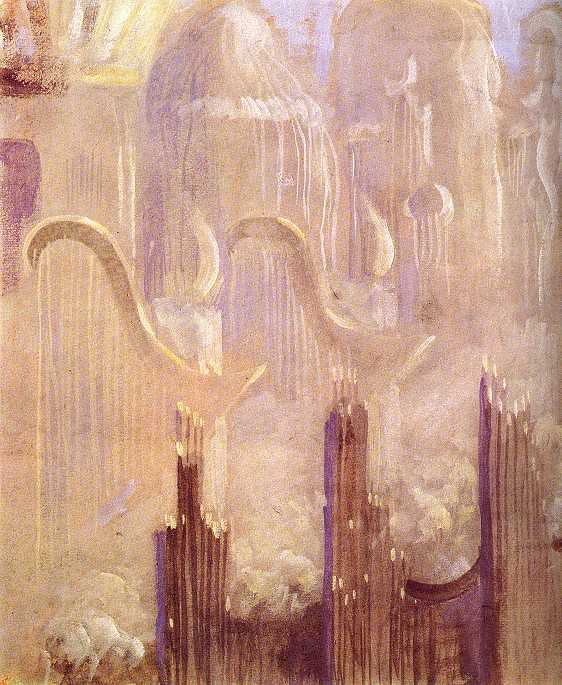
Creation of the World - XII (1906-1907)

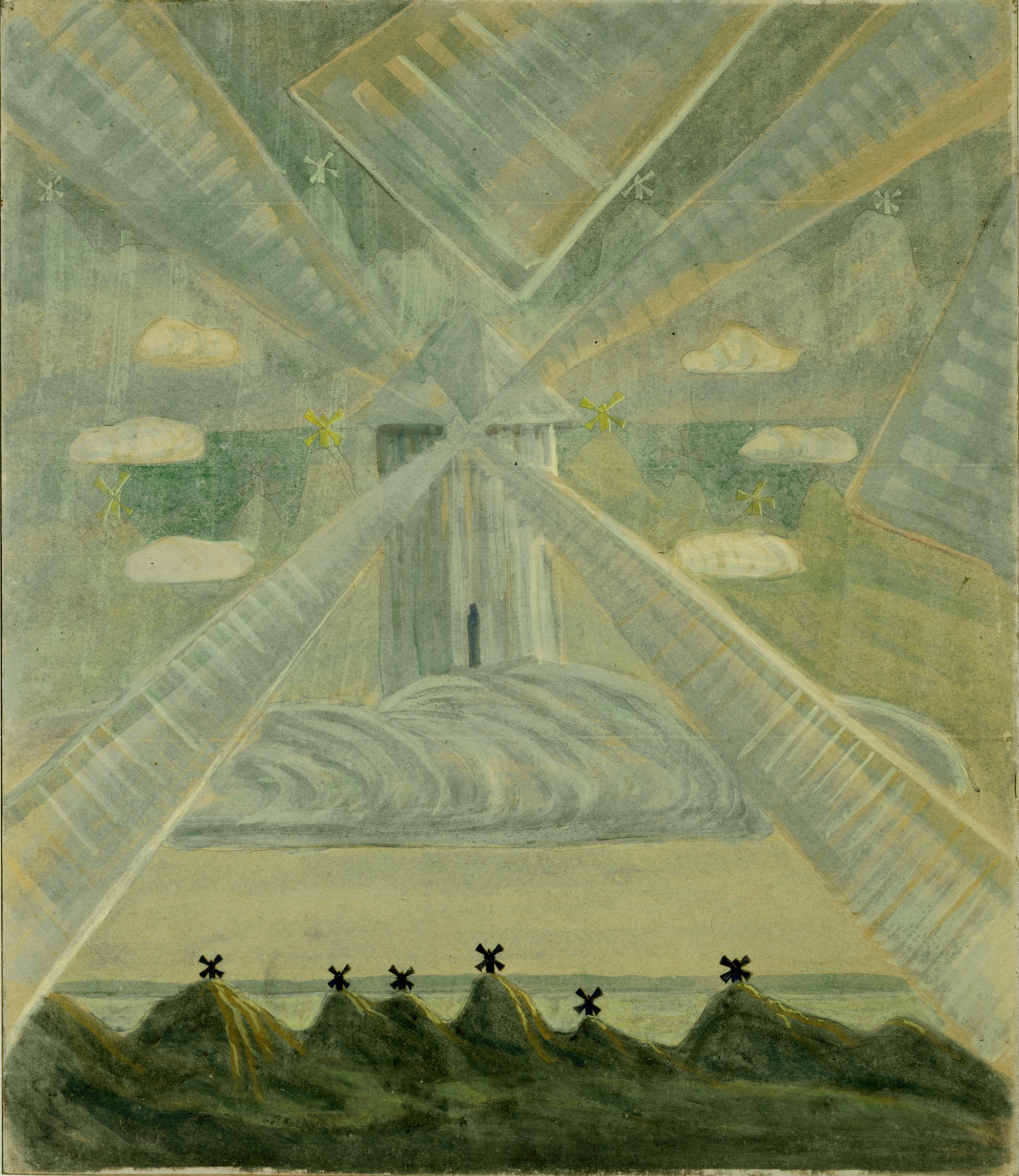
Sonata - II (1907)

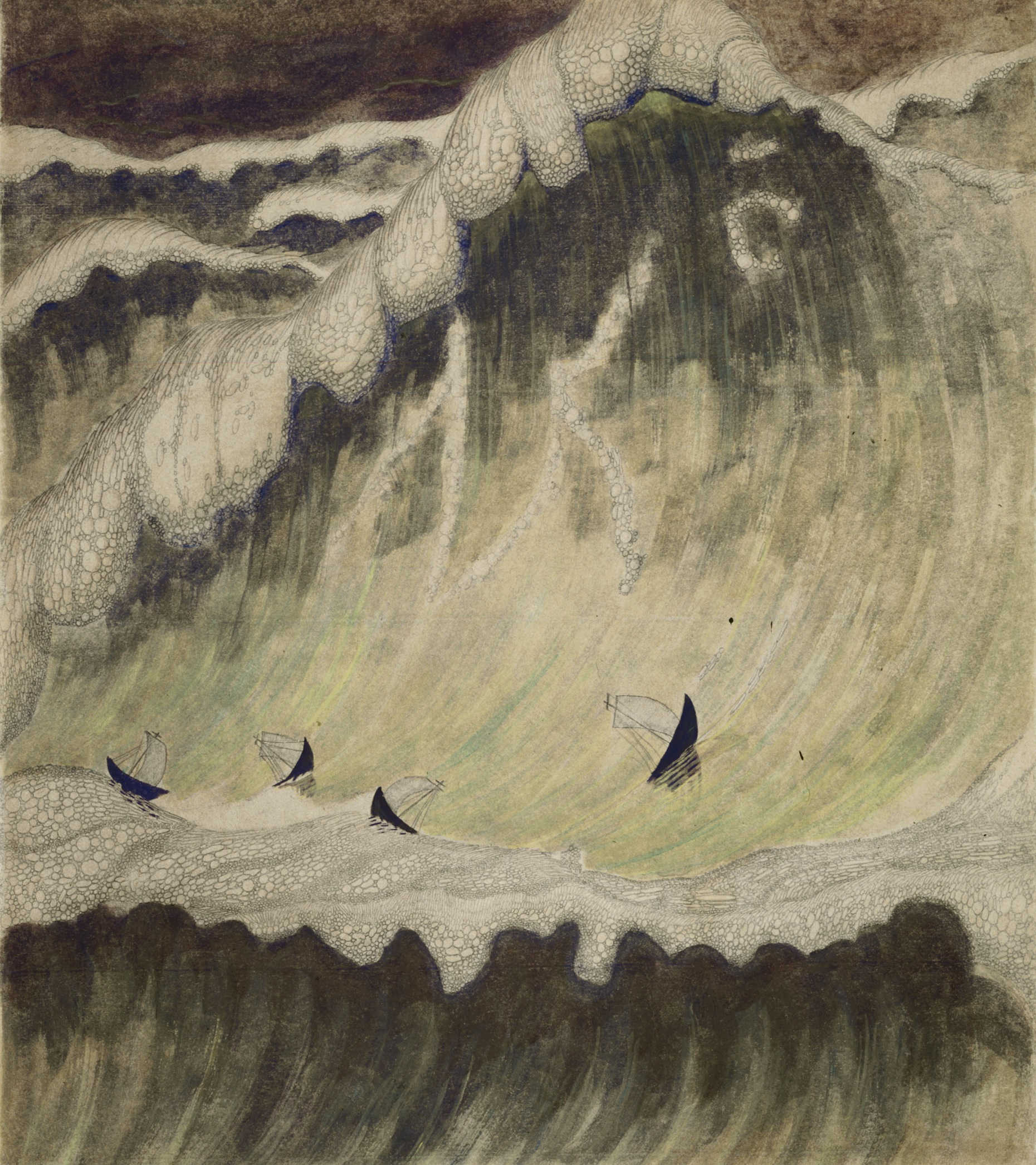
Sonata of the Sea. Finale (1908)

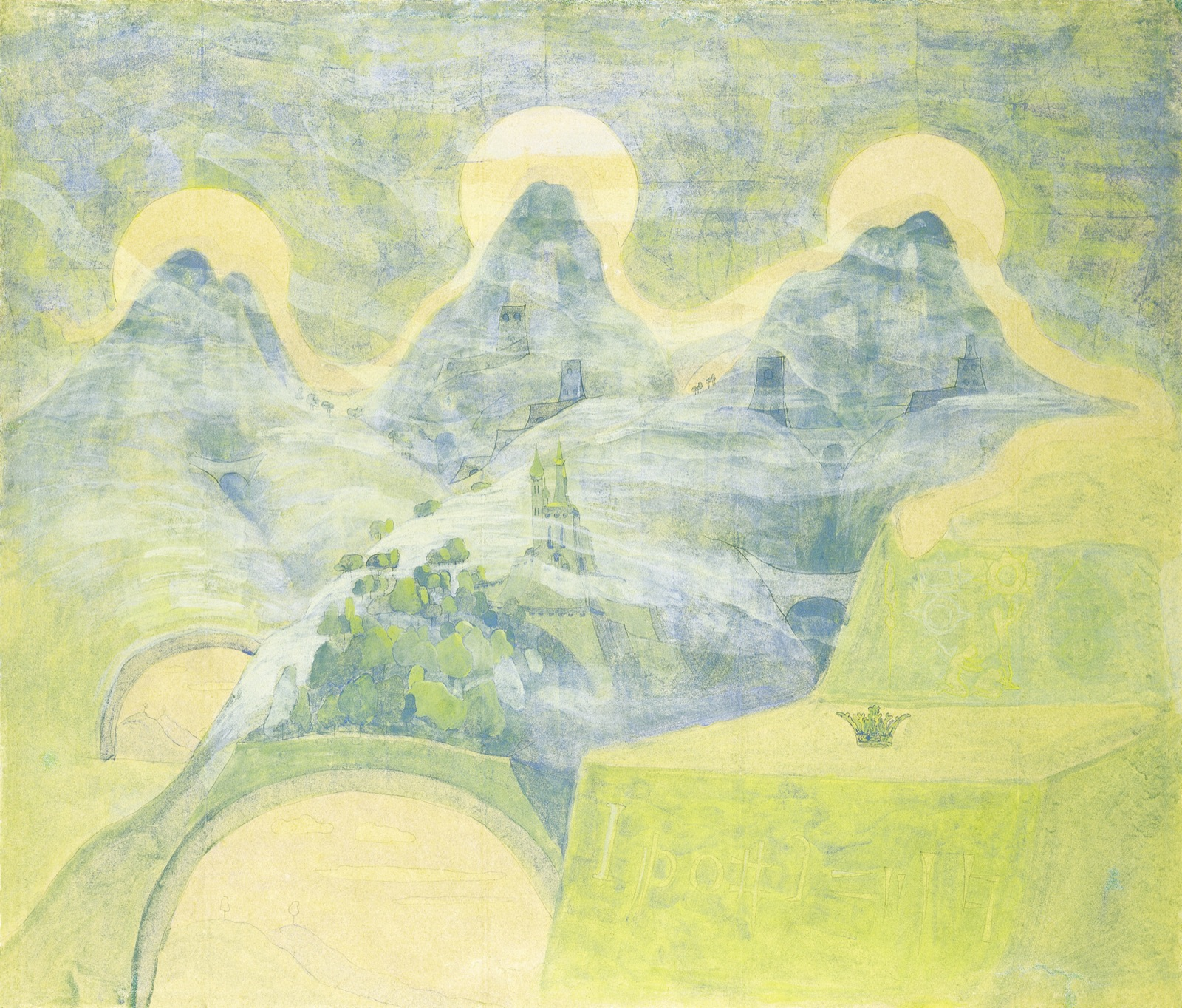
Finale - III (1908)

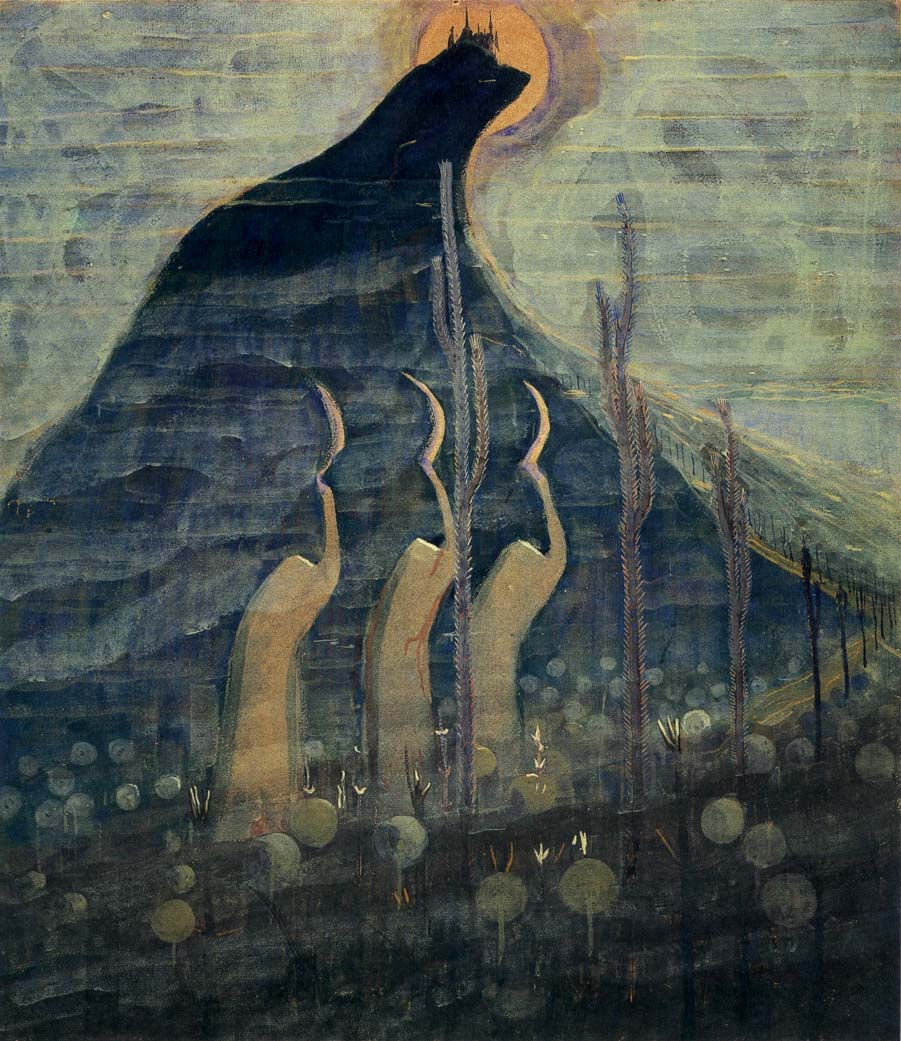
Fairy Tale - I (1907)

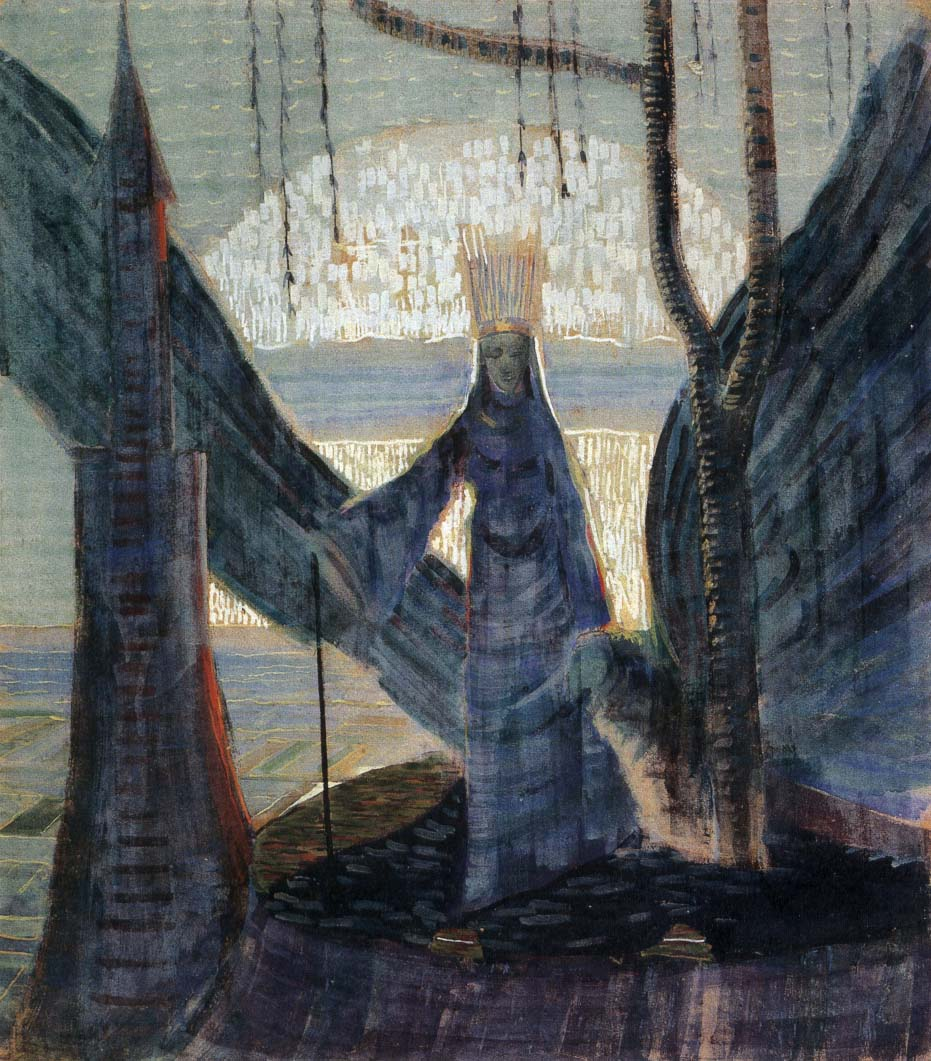
Fairy Tale - III (1907)

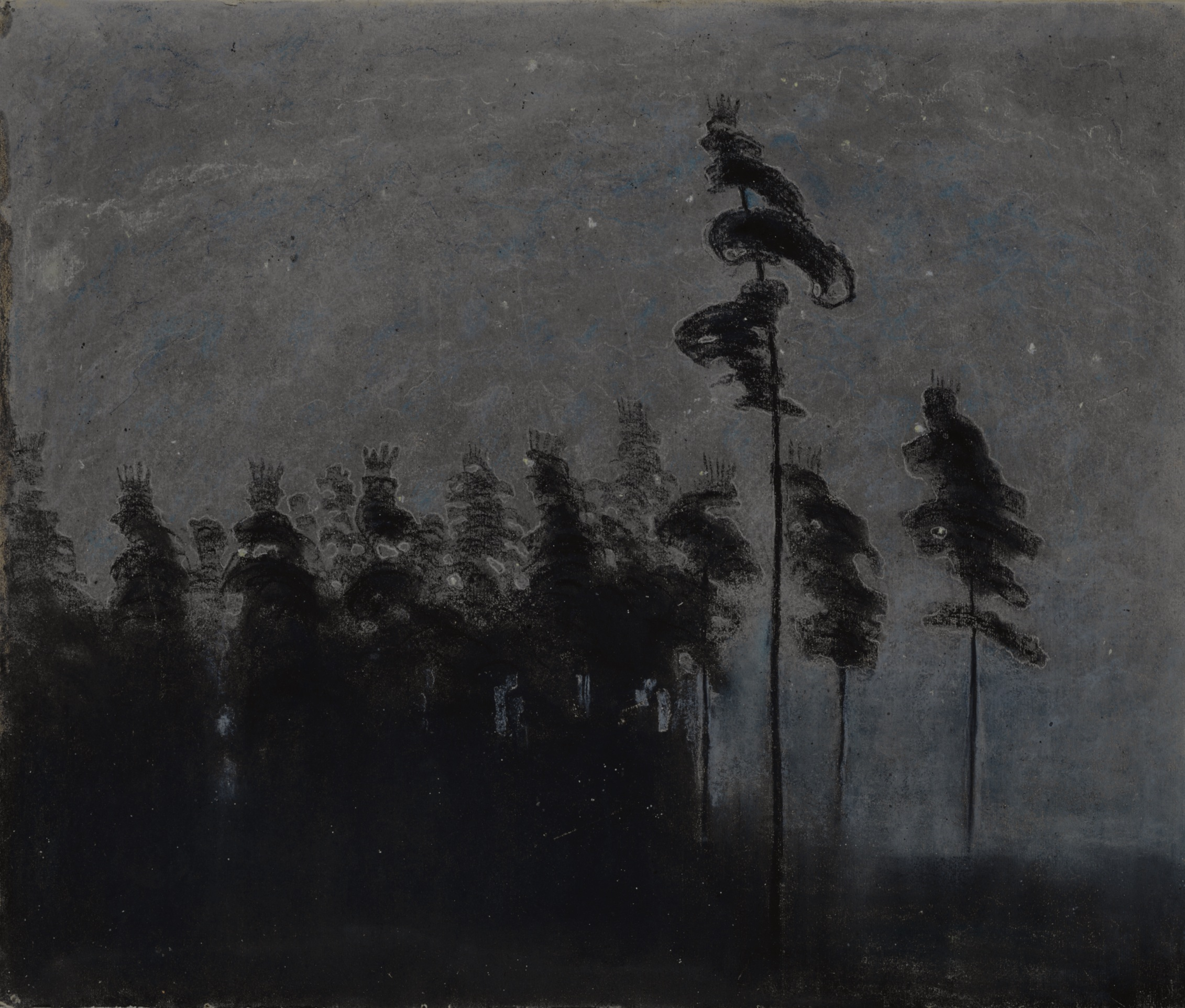
Forest (1907)

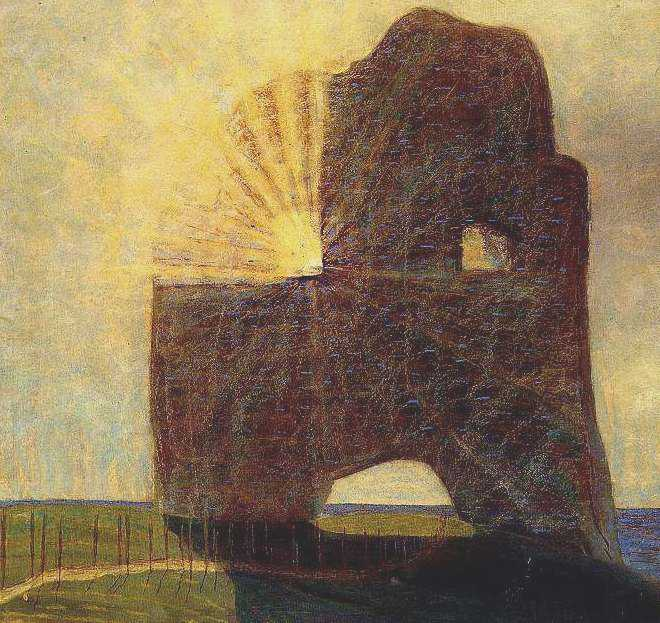
The Past (1907)

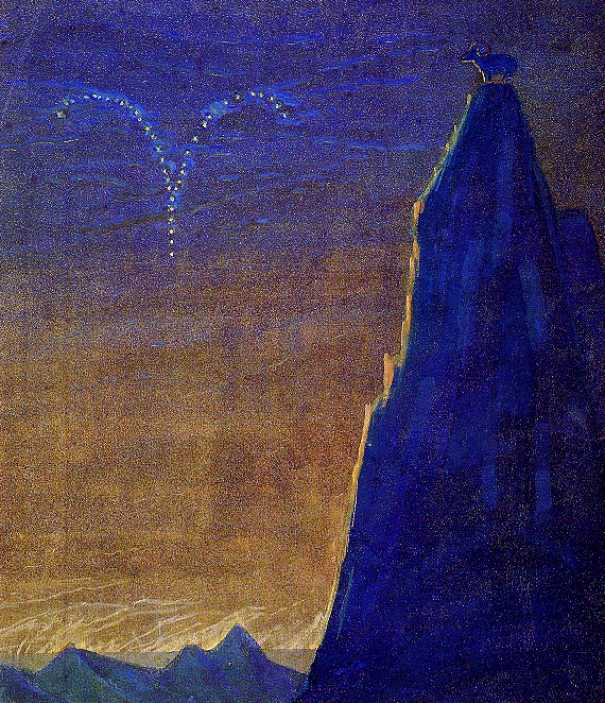
The Zodiac cycle - Aries (1907)

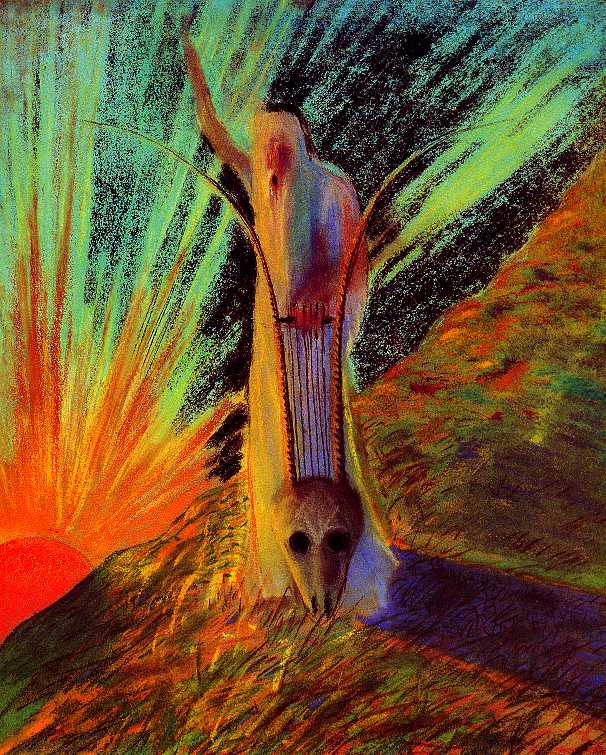
Morning Fantasy (1904)

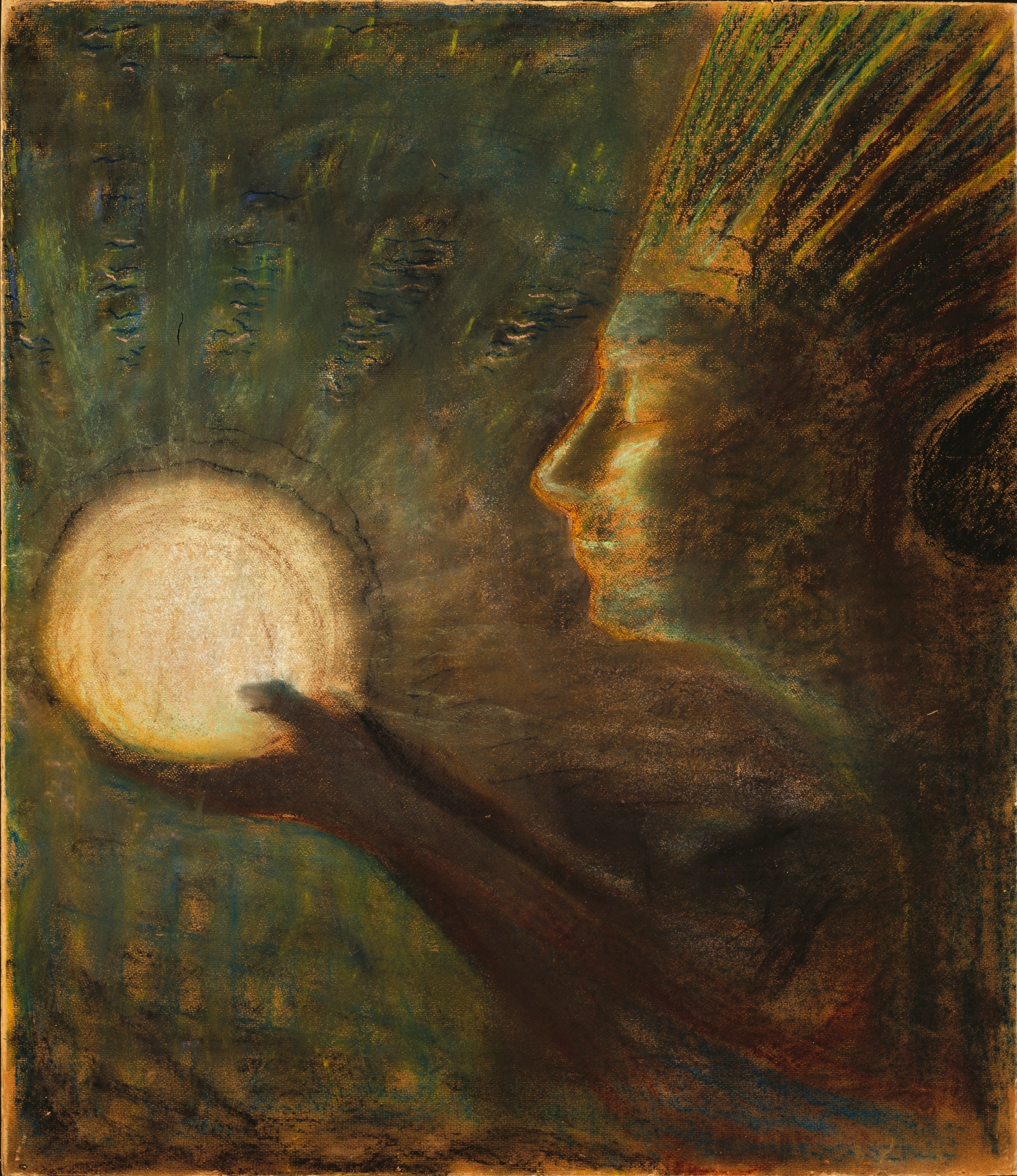
The Gift of Friendship (1906)

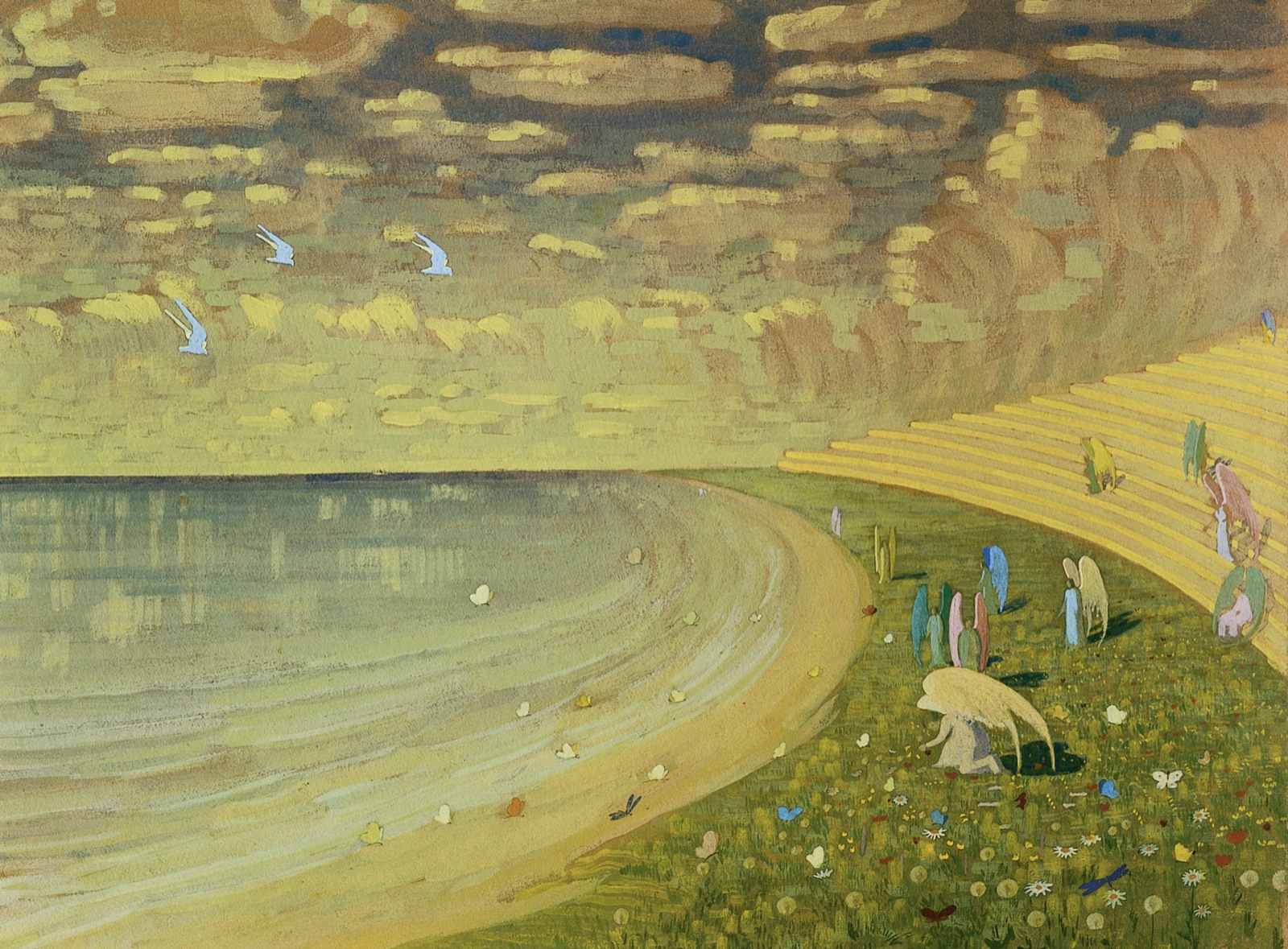
Paradise (1909)

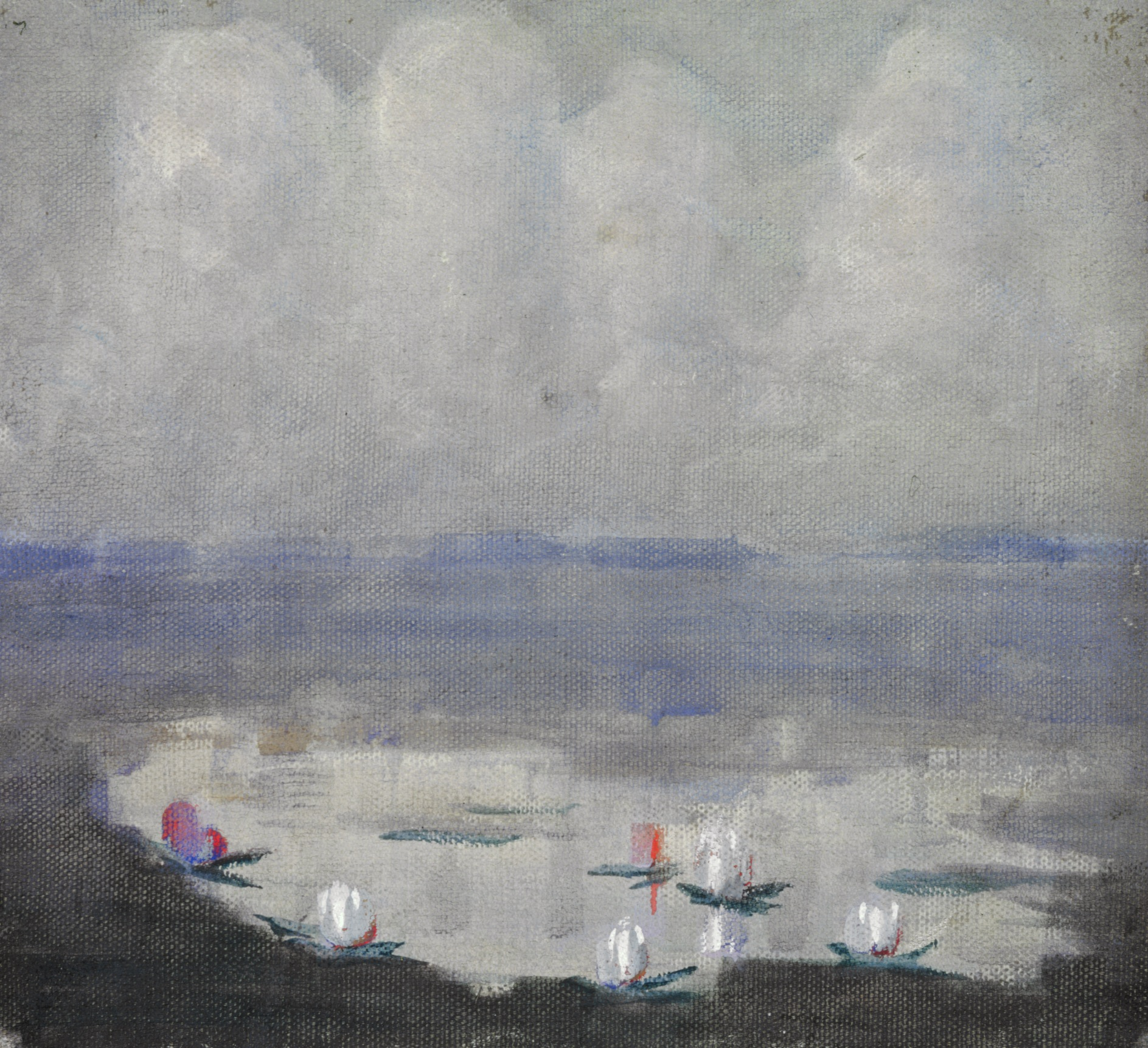
Evening (1907)

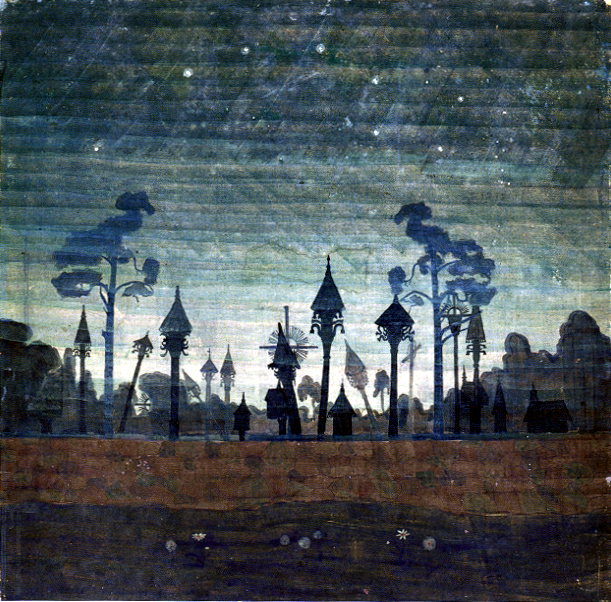
Rural Cemetery (1909)

== Family ==
Mikalojus had four brothers: Povilas Čiurlionis (1884-1945), Stasys Čiurlionis (1887-1944), Petras Čiurlionis (1890-1924), Jonas Čiurlionis (1891-1955) and four sisters: Marija Čiurlionytė (1879-1969), Juzė Čiurlionytė-Stulgaitienė (1882-1966), Valerija Čiurlionytė-Karužienė (1896-1982), Jadvyga Čiurlionytė (1898-1992).

== See also ==
- List of things named after Mikalojus Konstantinas Čiurlionis
- Rokas Zubovas
