= Church of the Immaculate Conception, Kantaučiai =

Church in Kantaučiai, Lithuania

Kantaučiai Immaculate Conception of the Holy Virgin Mary church
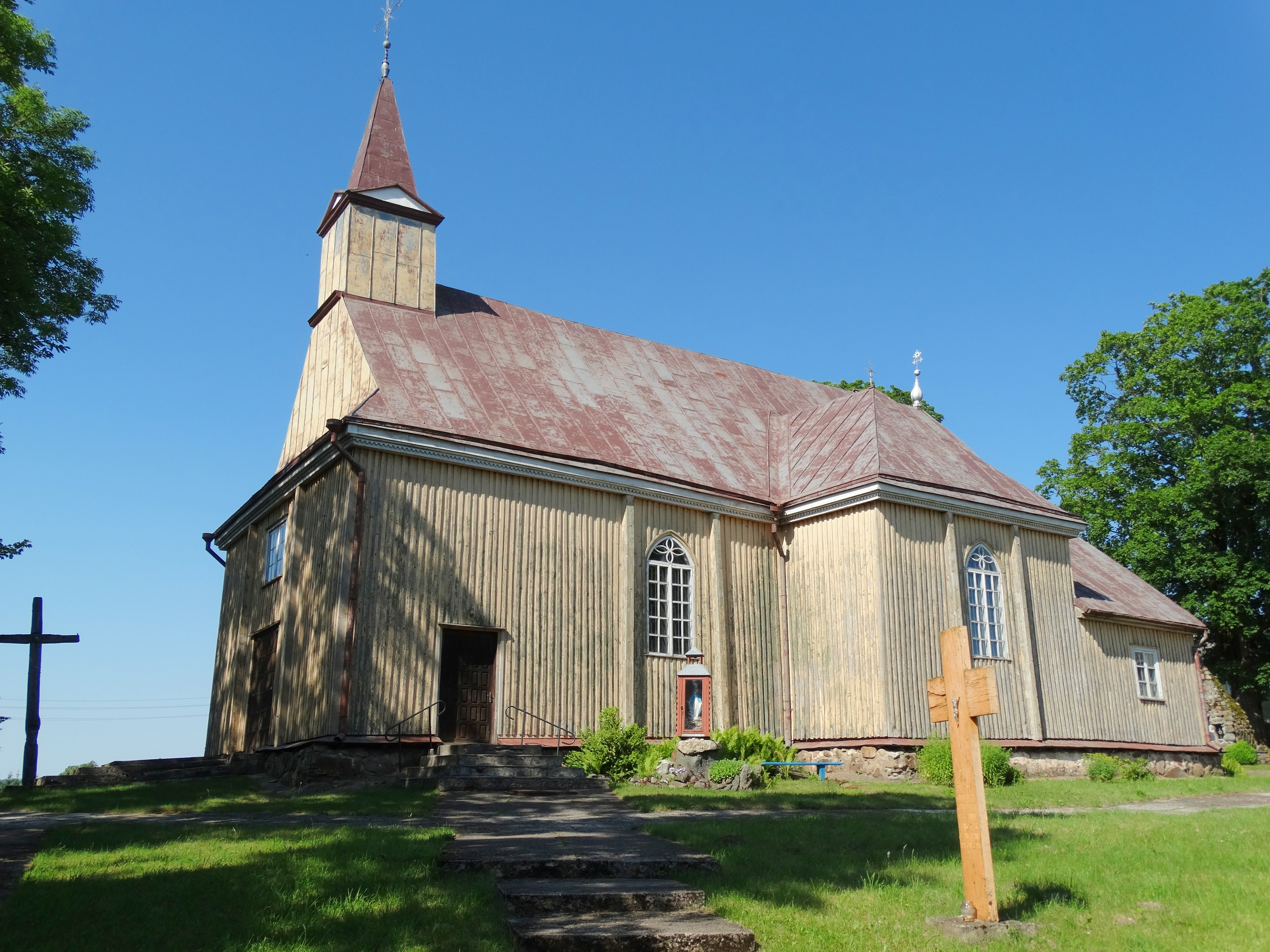
- Interactive map of the Kantaučiai Immaculate Conception of the Holy Virgin Mary church area

General information
- Location: Kantaučiai, Lithuania
- Coordinates: 55.903655°N 22.052117°E

Website
- www.

Kantaučiai Immaculate Conception of the Holy Virgin Mary church is located in Kantaučiai Village, 12 km from Plungė. The wooden church in a Lithuanian folk architecture style is known for its stories of apparitions of the Holy Virgin Mary, where three of them were recorded in the last sixty years.

== History ==
It is thought that the first wooden church was built in 1619 in the graveyard of the town. There was no permanent priest; however, the Šiukštas family resided in the town, and managed to convince the Duke Kazimieras Pacas to establish a parish there along with the villages of Džiuginėnai and Pagermantis. The Šiukštas family, by supporting the construction of the church, hoped to establish the Brotherhood of the Holy Rosary there. For some time, the church held the title of the Rosary of the Holy Virgin Mary. A new church was built in 1768, while the one you will find in Kantaučiai today was built in 1852. In 1980, a Lourdes replica was also constructed near the church. The present-day Kantaučiai parish church has a rectangular layout with 6 splendid altars. Due to its simple traditional form and layout, the church can be assigned to the Romantic period. The trapezium shaped, crossed over and single nave pediment is finished off with a turret and a steeple. The façade is decorated with pointed arch windows. The central ornament of the church is the main altar. It is massive and features wooden carvings, gold plated ornaments and images of the saints.

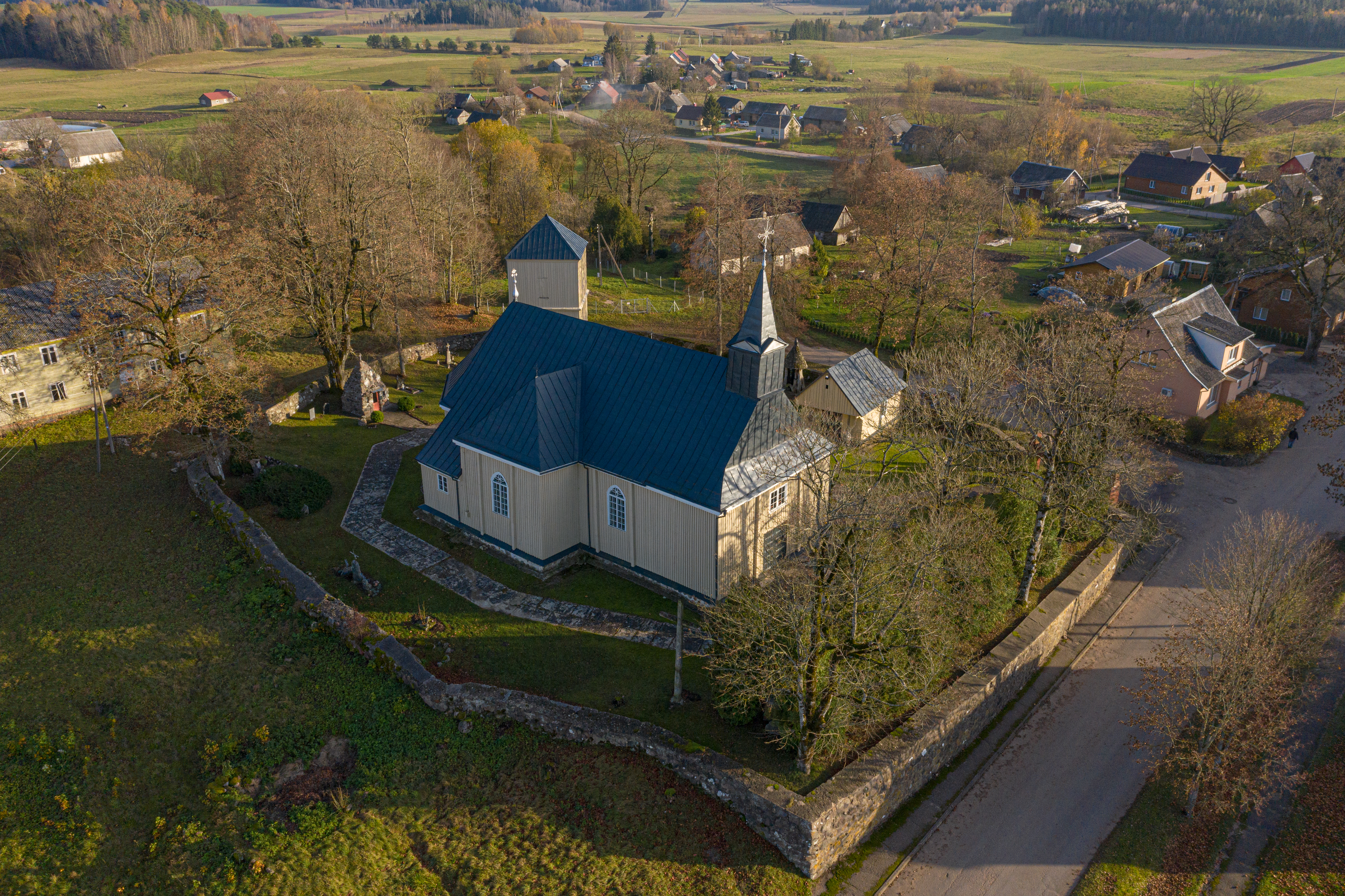
Aerial view of the church

== Gallery ==
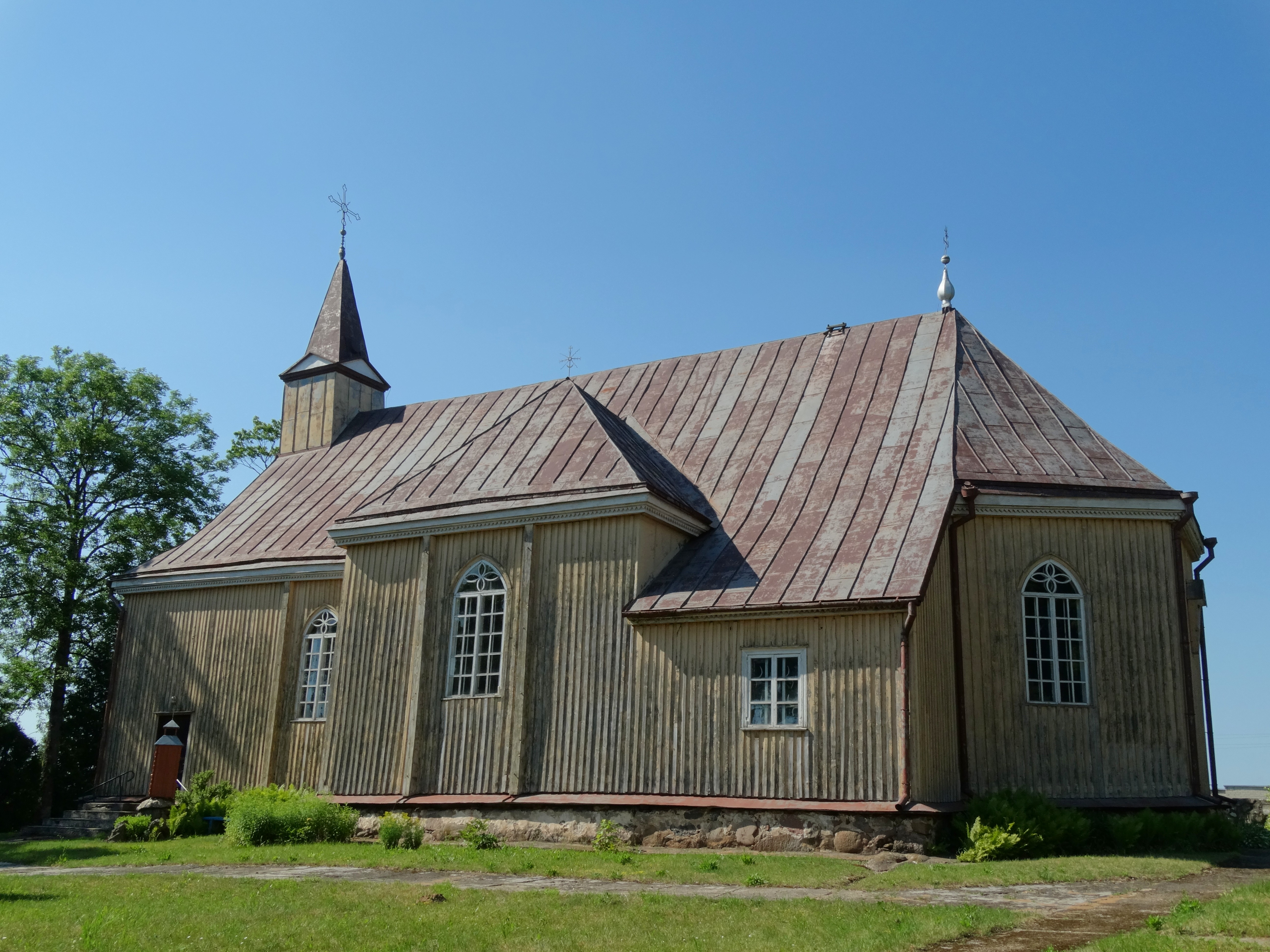

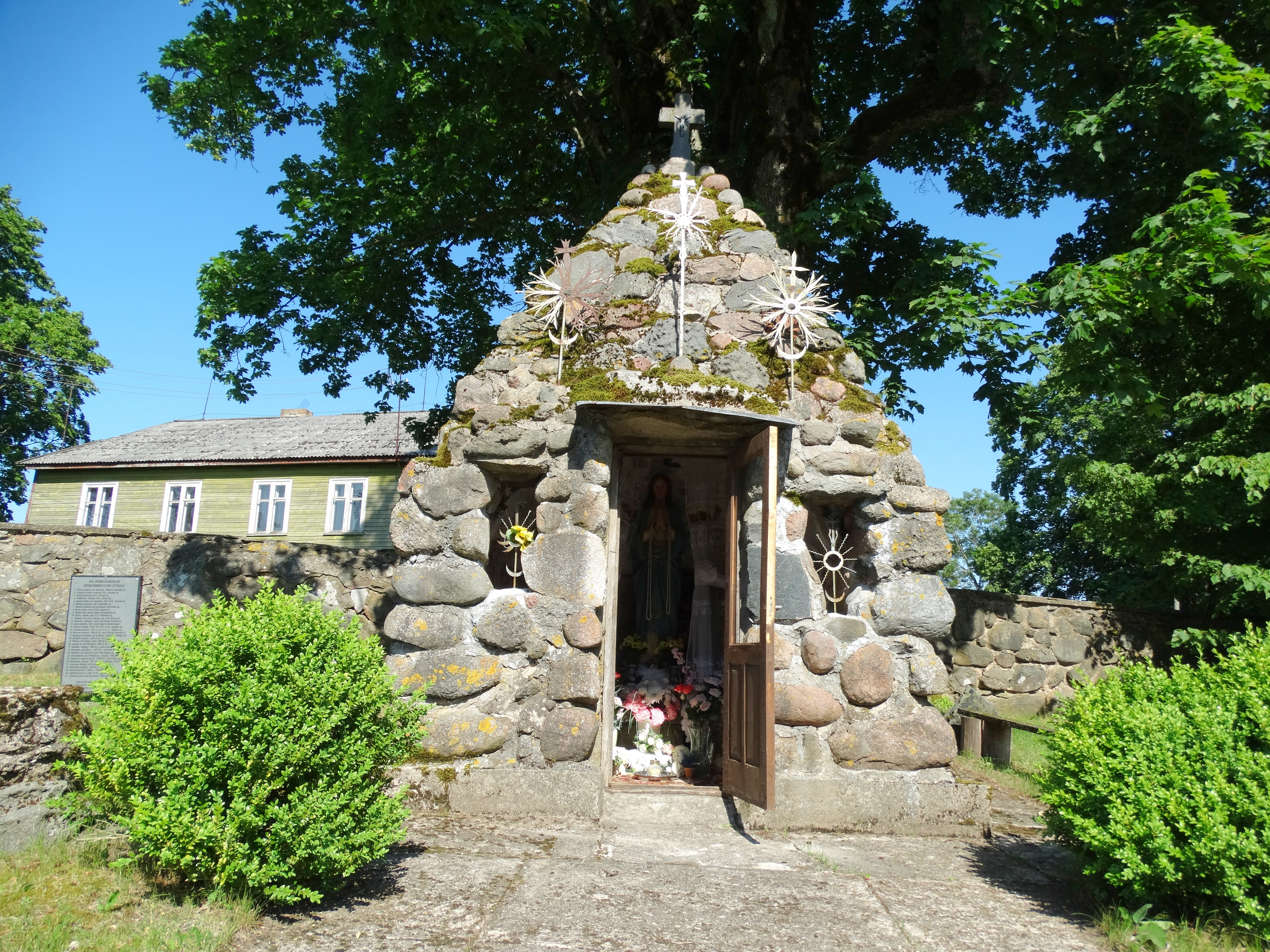

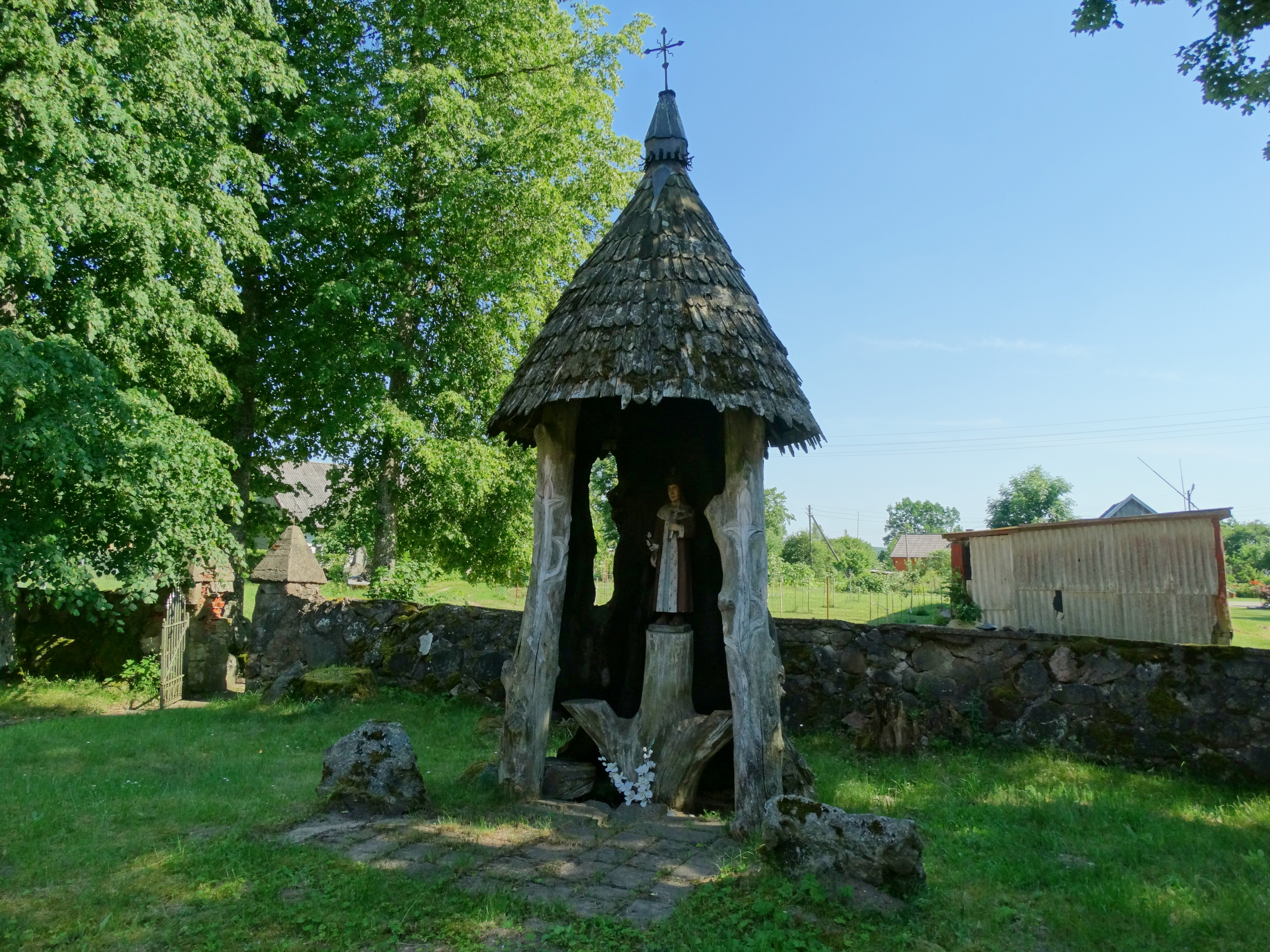

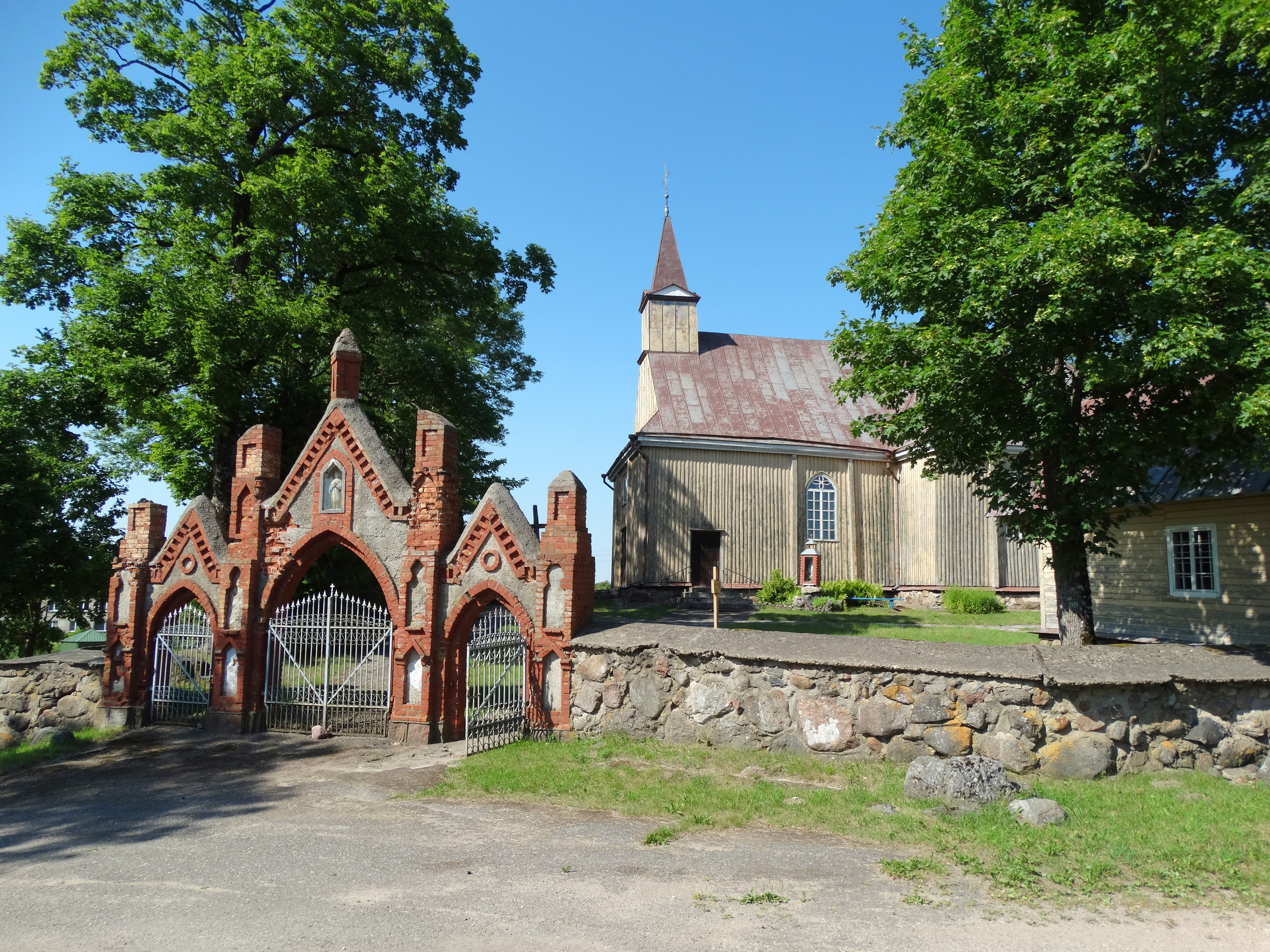

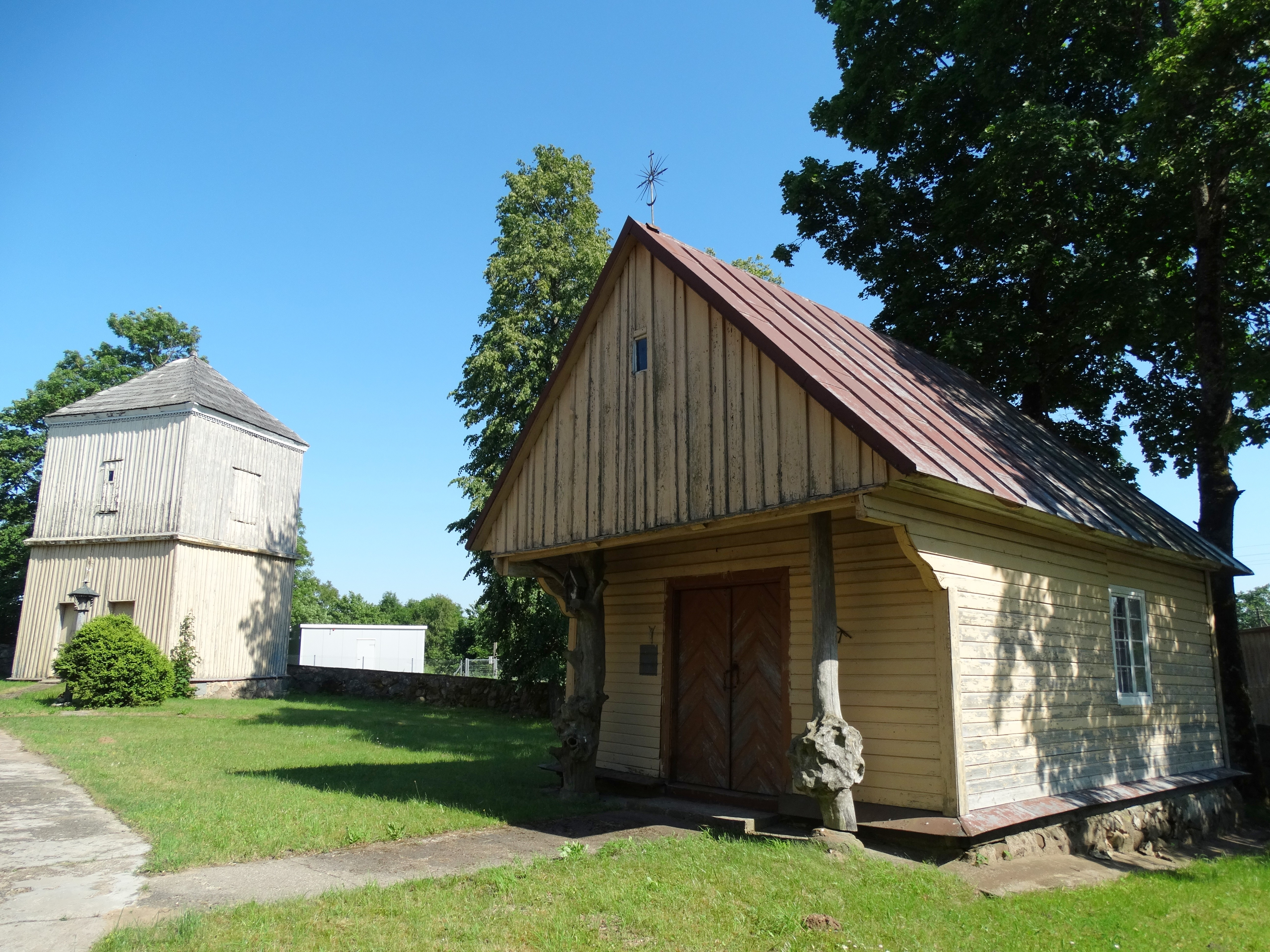

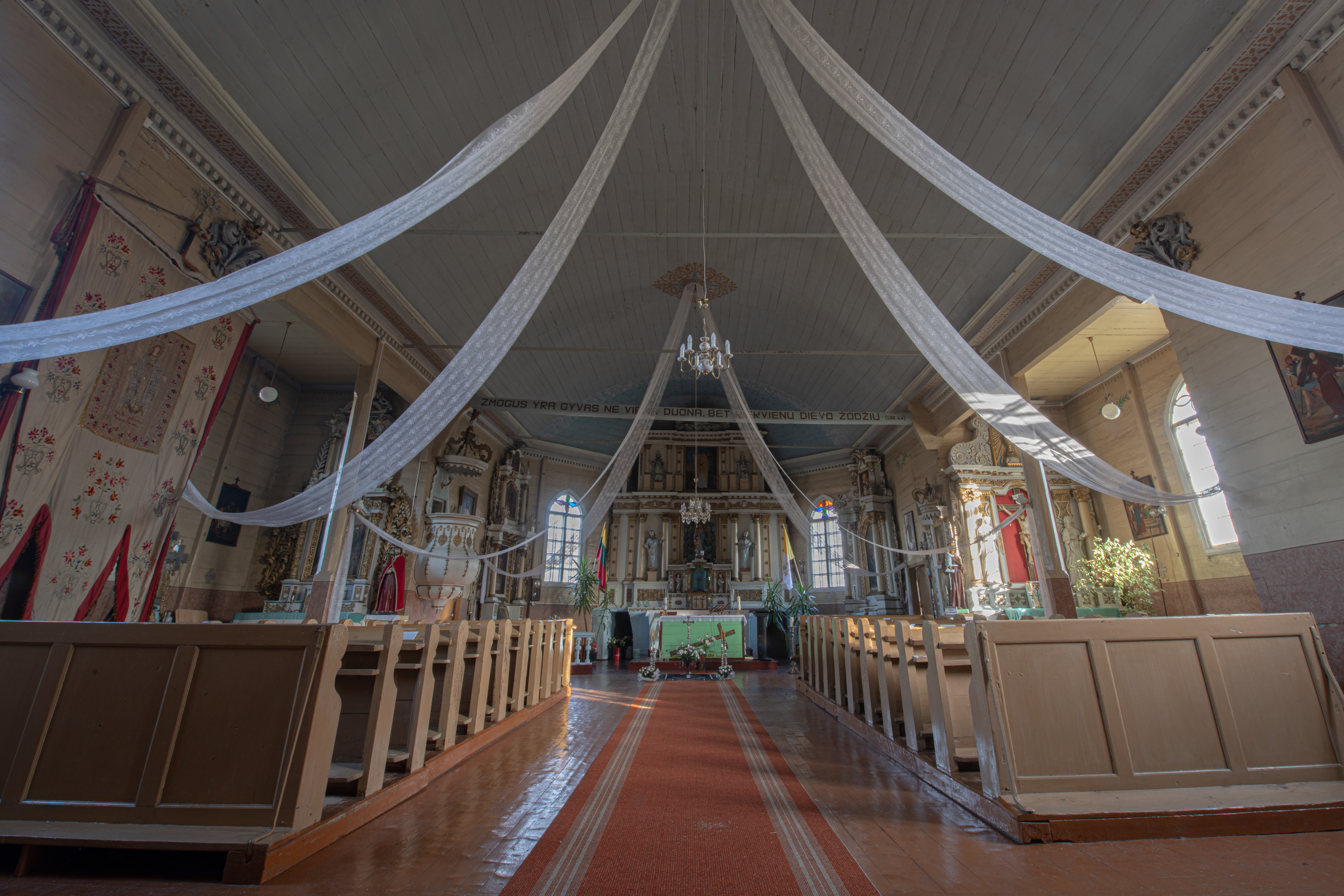

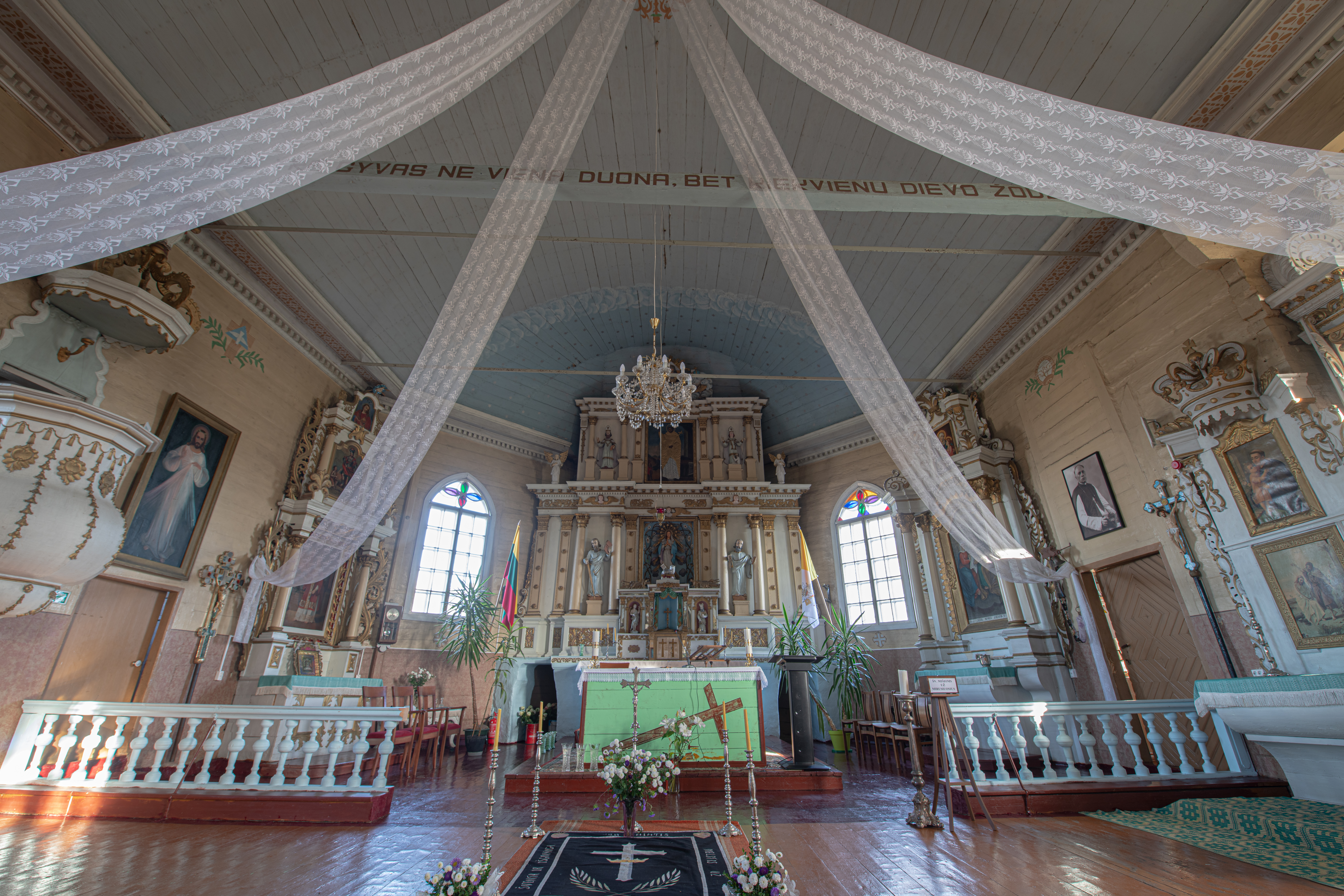

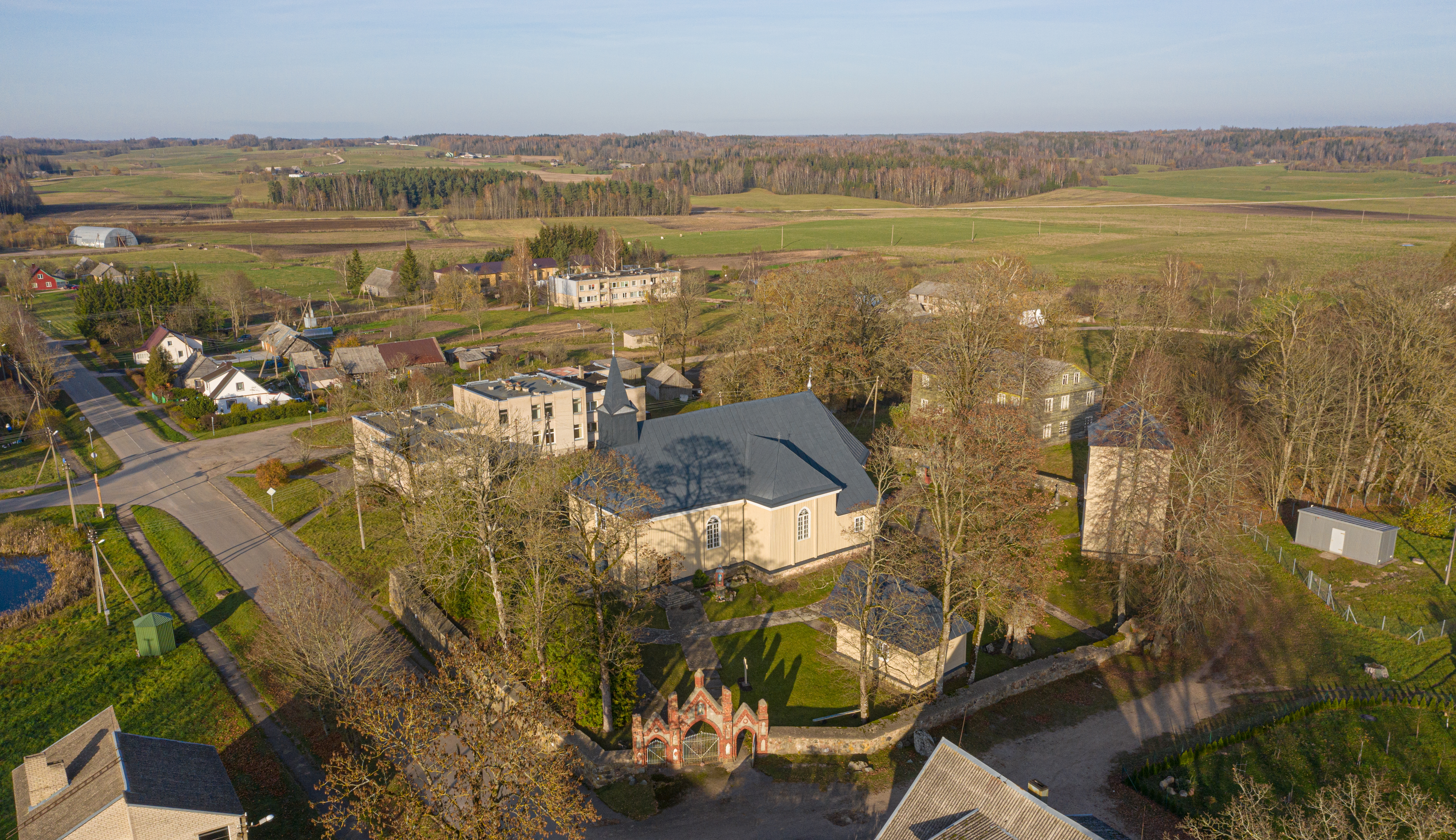

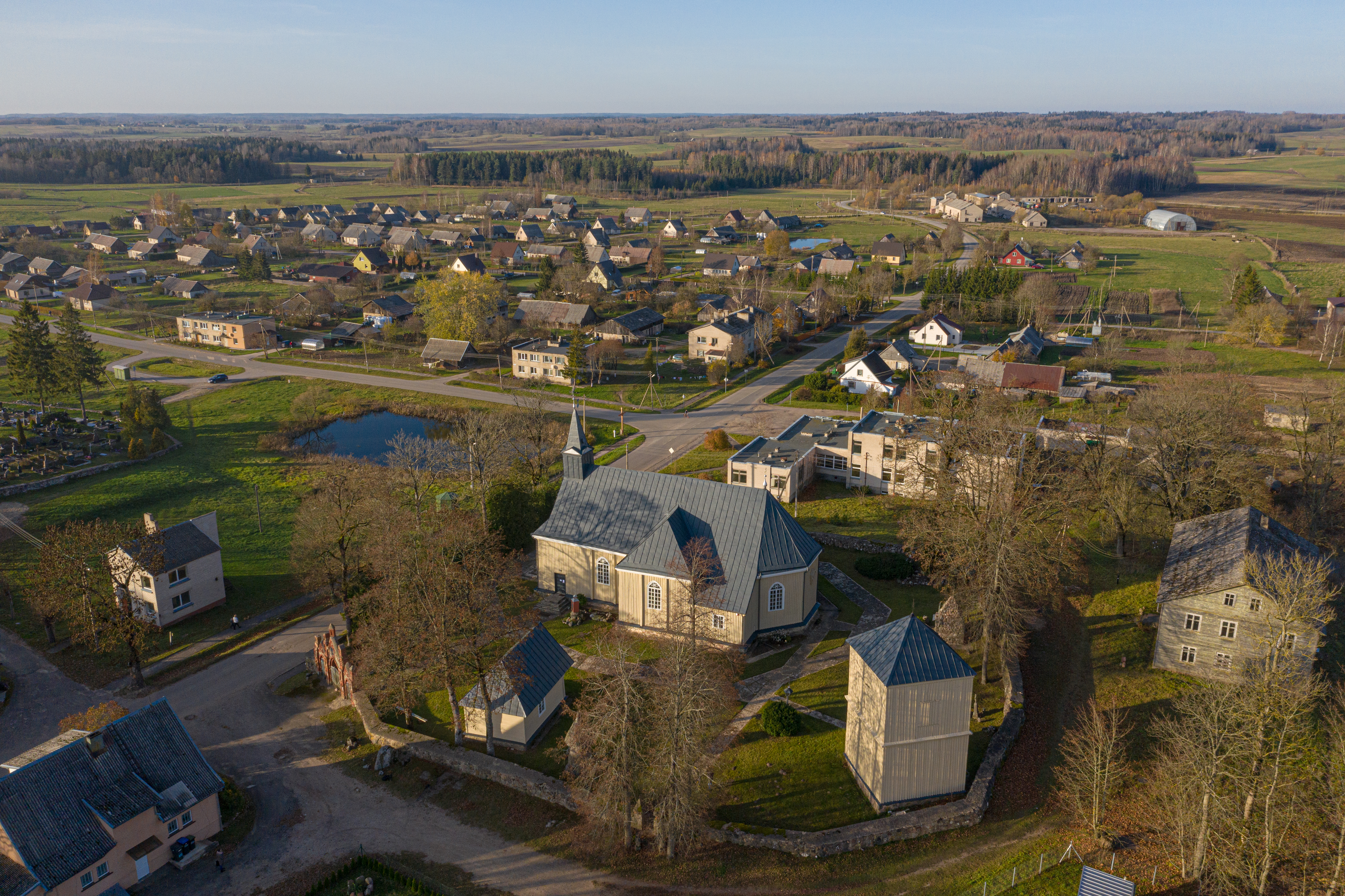

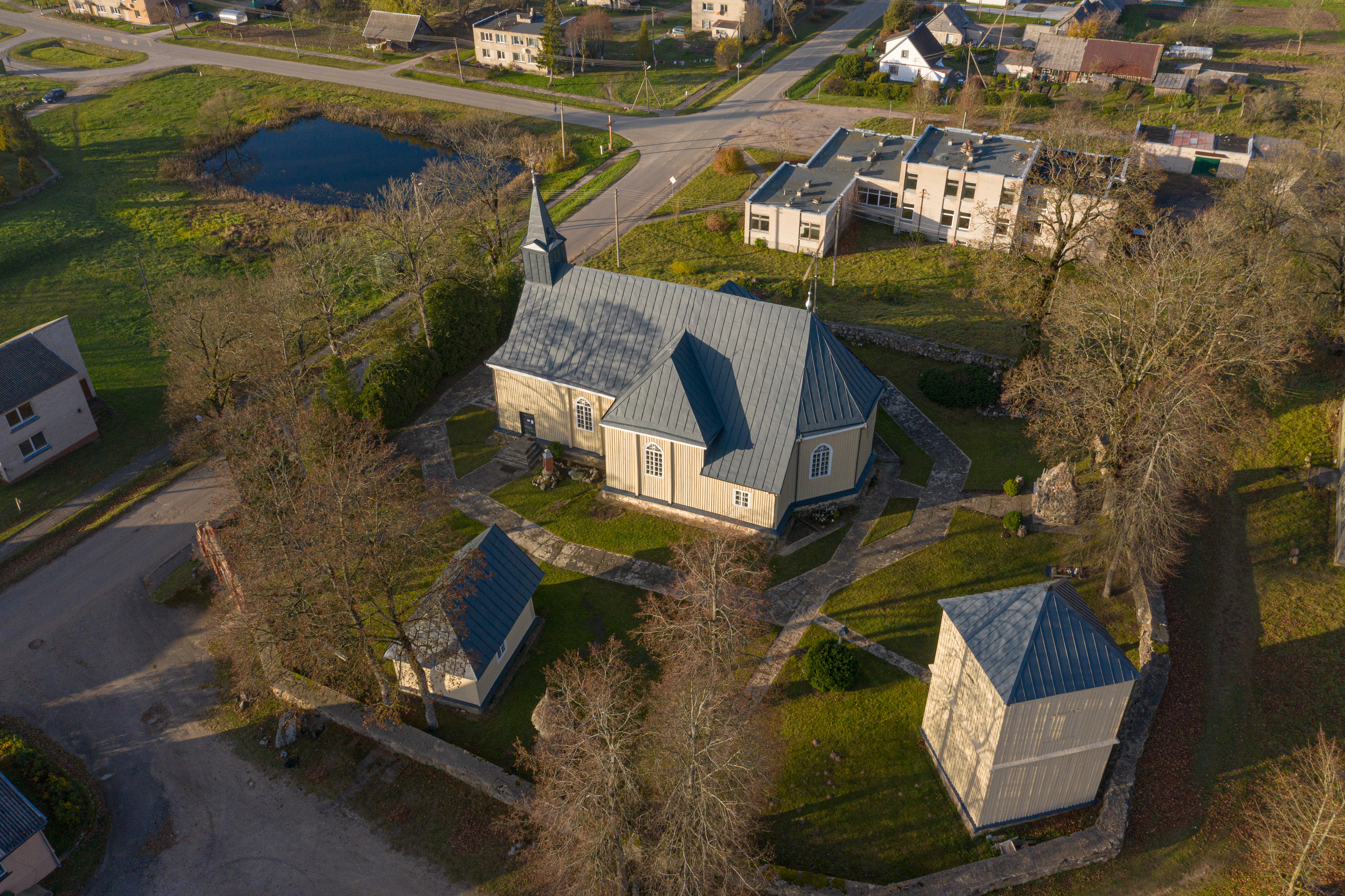
