= Perkūnas Oak =

Remarkable oak tree in Lithuania

Perkūnas’s Oak
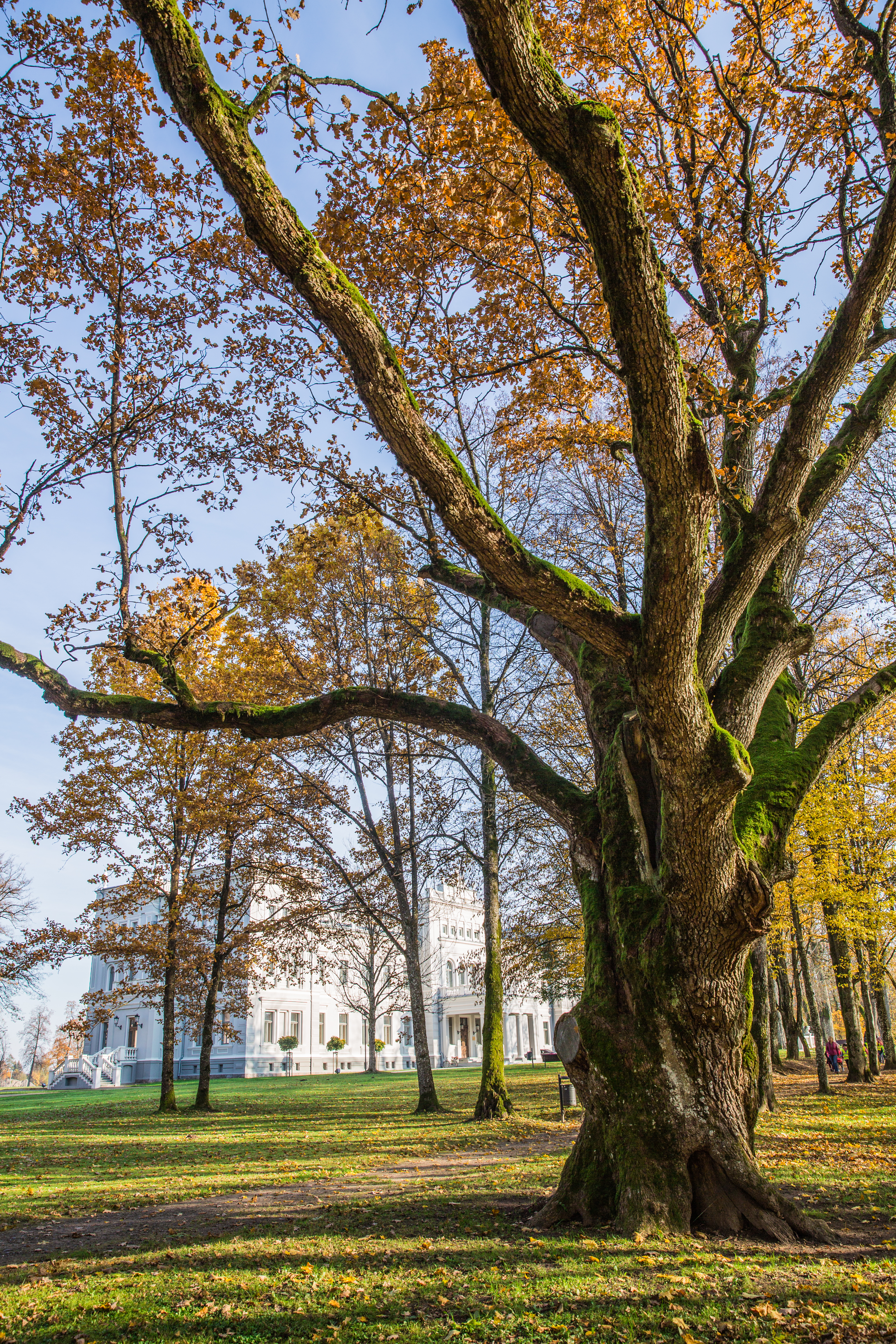
- Interactive map of Perkūnas’s Oak
- Location: Plungė, Lithuania
- Coordinates: 55°55′03.3″N 21°50′37.3″E

Perkūnas’s Oak is the oldest oak tree in Plungė Mansion Park – grows in the central area of the park next to Oginskis Palace. The diameter of Perkūnas’s Oak is 1.65 m, while its height is 25 m. The tree was declared a natural monument in 1960, and since 1987 it has been a natural monument of national significance.

== History ==
The tree itself is not only culturally significant, but also the myths and legends that surround it. It is told that during pagan times, the priestess Galinda kept an eternal holy flame burning there. When her beloved left for war with the Teutonic Order and did not return, the woman cried her eyes out. An old priest began comforting her, saying that only the holy flame could put out her earthly love. Thunder appeared in the sky and a bolt of lightning was fired into a nearby oak. The priest then saw a flower growing inside the hollowed tree. Therefore, the oak was given the name of Perkūnas, and it is said that the tree is so strong that no earthly forces can harm it. In the historical memoirs of Plungė residents, suggestions are found that Michał Mikołaj Ogiński's wife Maria used to organise performances for children under Perkūnas’s Oak.

== Gallery ==
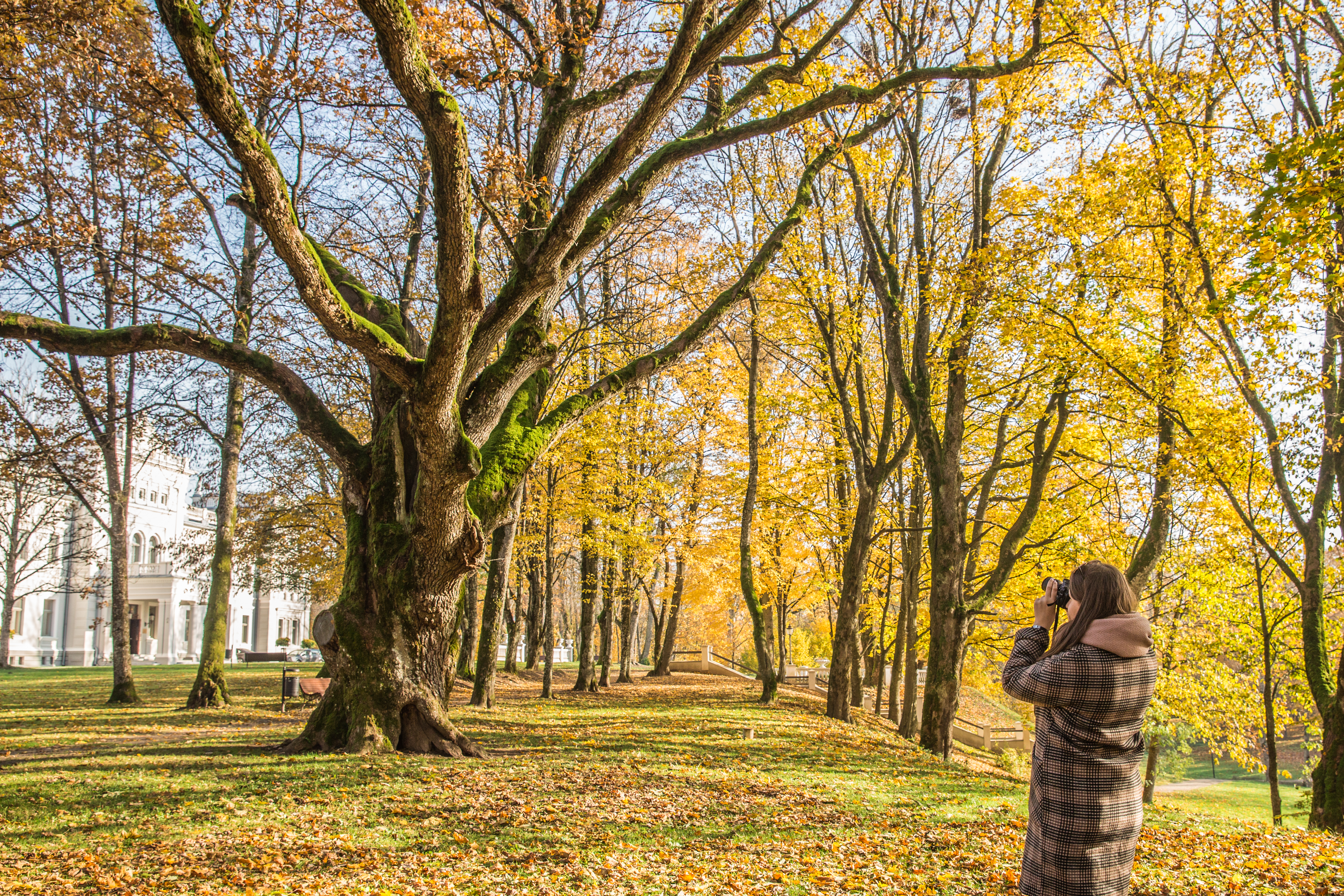

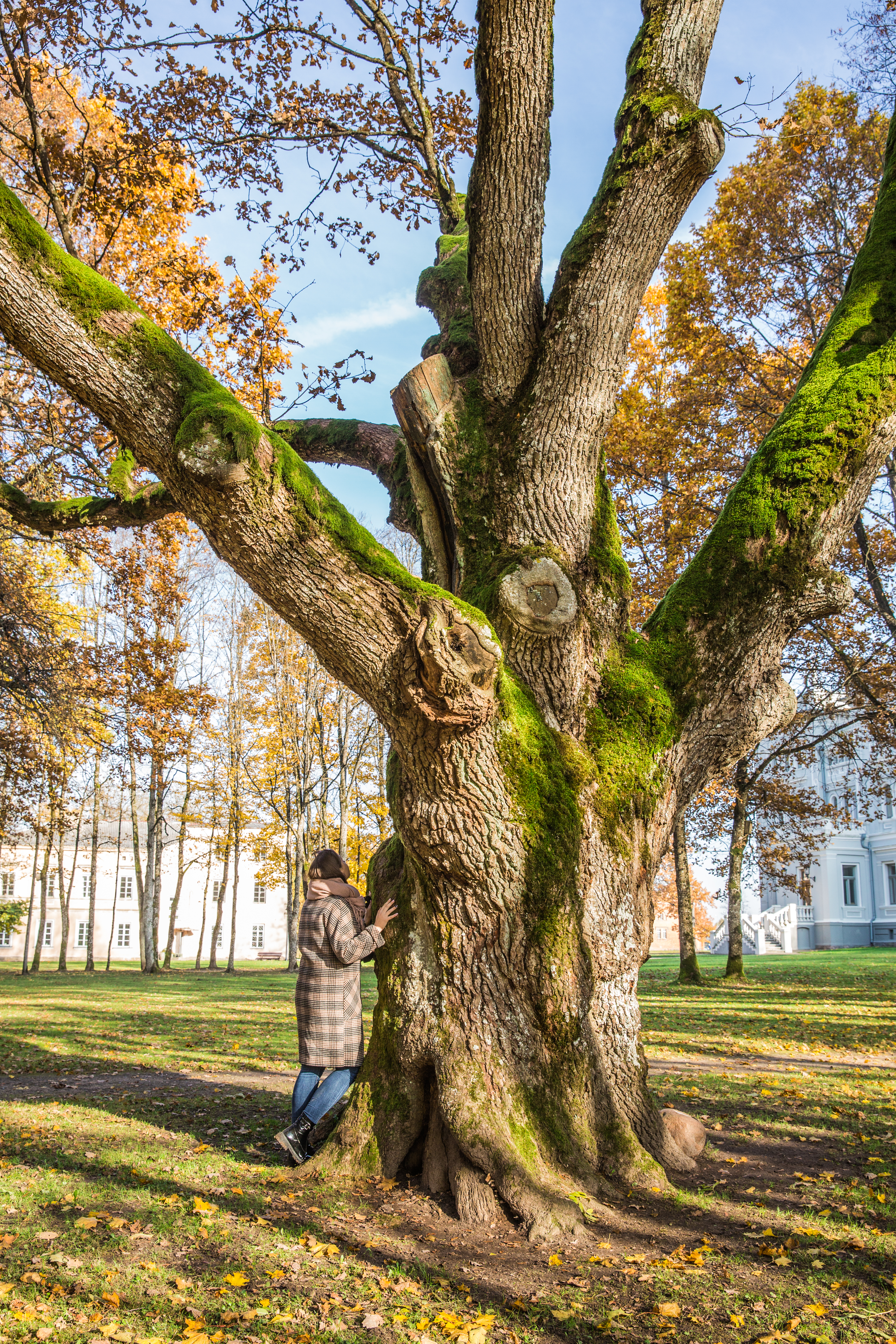

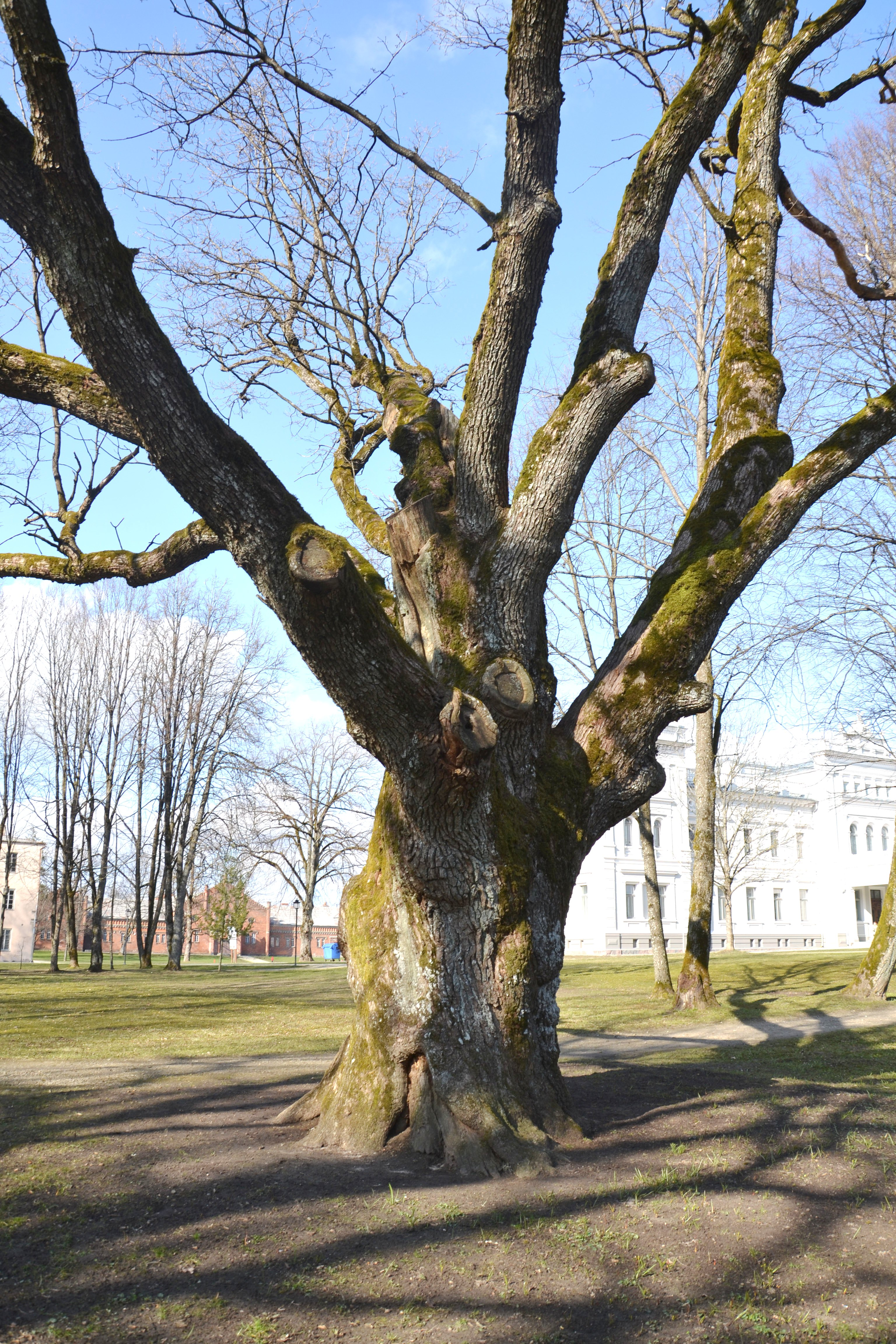

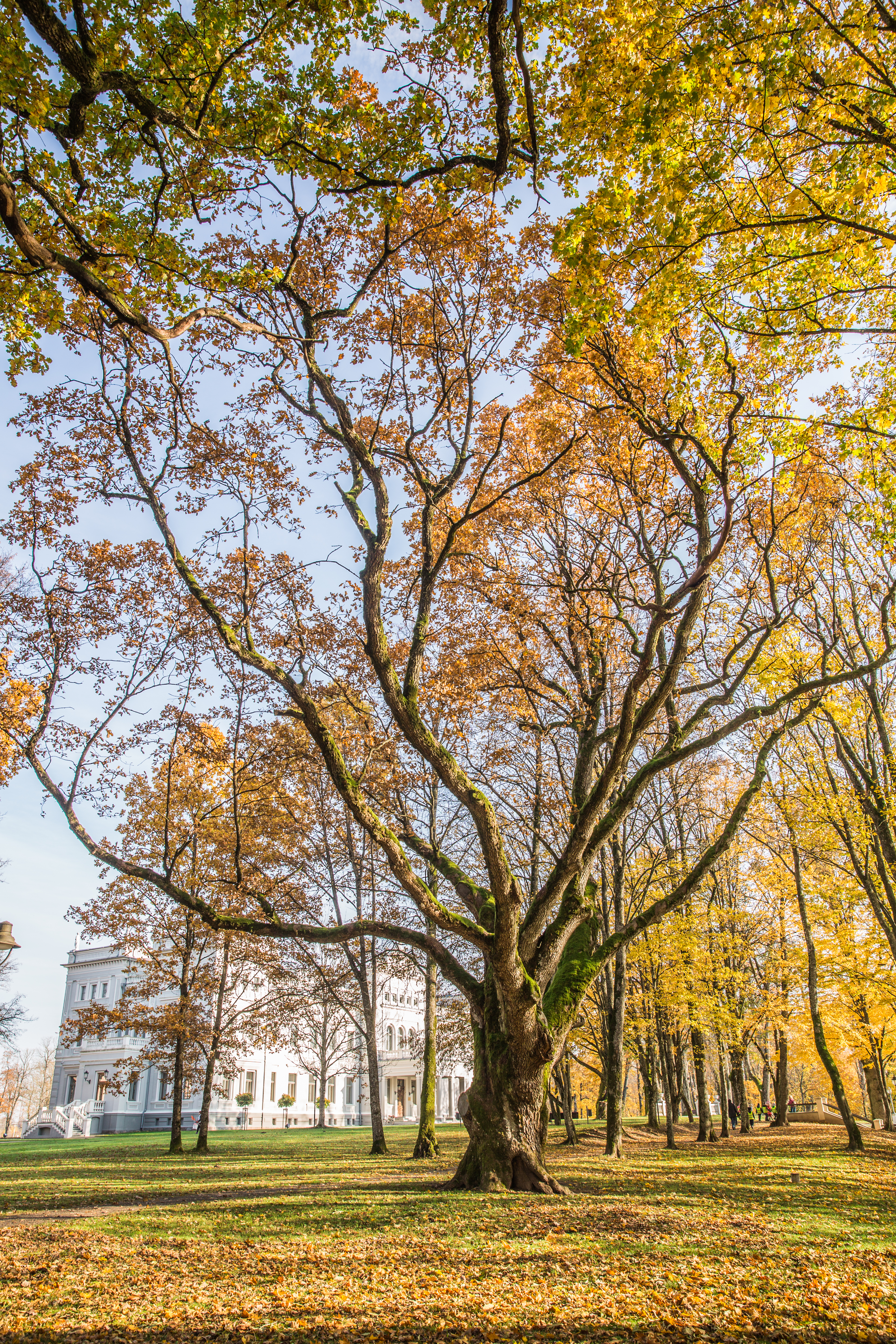

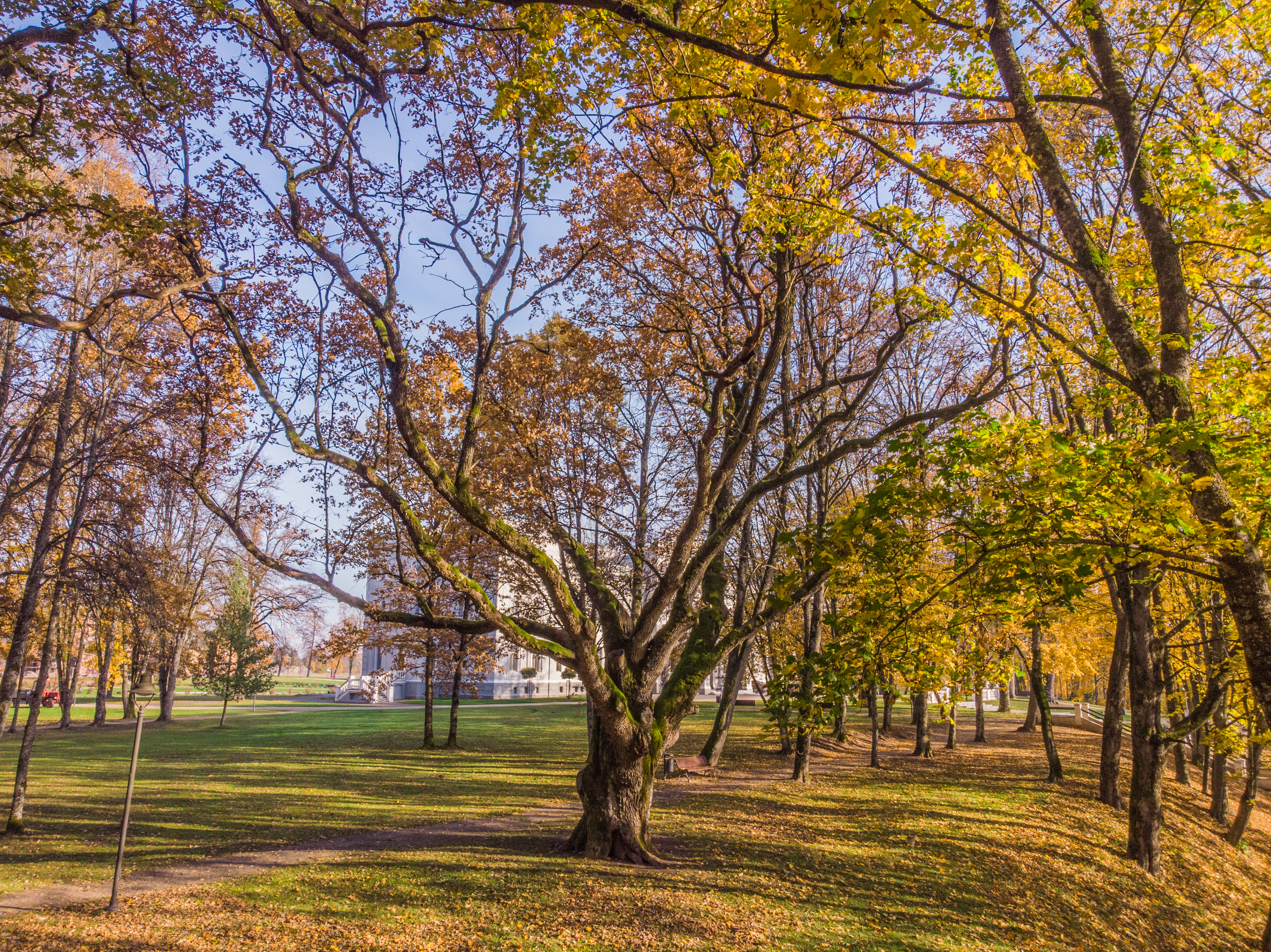
