= Jacob Bunka =

Jewish sculptor (1923–2014)

Jacob Bunka (Lithuanian: Jakovas Bunka; 13 July 1923 – 30 July 2014) was a Jewish sculptor, known as the last Jew of Plungė who carved large monumental wooden statues at Holocaust sites in Lithuania.

== Early life ==
Bunka war born in Plungė in 1923 to a Jewish family, half the town being Jewish in the interwar period. In 1941 Bunka and his family were found themselves in Siberia, where he was recruited into the Red Army.

== World War II ==
In 1942, Bunka was drafted with his father and brother to the 16th Lithuanian Division (Soviet). Bunka and his father were wounded in battle and recuperated in Zlatoust Hospital. Sent to the Belorussian front, Bunka was attached to the 1452nd Self-propelled Artillery Regiment. He was subsequently attached to the 10th Don Cossack regiment, serving in an intelligence role due to his German language skills. Bunka served in the Battle of Berlin. Bunka's father and brother died in service, while his mother and three sisters survived in Siberia. Following the end of the war Bunka served until 1947 in the Soviet occupation zone in the village of Ahrenshoop. Bunka was decorated with several medals during his service.

== Post war ==
Bunka returned to Plungė, where following the war there were 138 Jews. In 1950 he married his wife Dalija, a Lithuanian, whom he knew from his childhood. Together they raised three kids, one dying. The surviving Jewish population of Plungė emigrated over the years, including Bunka's mother and sisters who emigrated to Israel, until he remained as the last Jew of Plunge.

Bunka was awarded the Knight's cross of the Order of the Lithuanian Grand Duke Gediminas by Lithuanian president Valdas Adamkus. The 1995 "Moses in Plateliai" documentary by Rimantas Gruodis is about his life.

Bunka died in 2014, prime minister Algirdas Butkevičius expressed his condolences.

== Art and memorial sites ==
In 1986, Bunka initiated the creation of a memorial for the Plungė massacre near the village of Kaušėnai. In 2007, the Jakovas Bunka Charity was set up to care for the site. He wrote a memorial yizkor book for Plungė.

Bunka created memorials in at least 10 different mass murder sites in Lithuania, his large wooden sculptures towering above the scene. In addition, Bunka crafted small wooden figurines of figures from the lost Jewish community.

Bunka was unique in that he created Jewish imagery in traditional Lithuanian wood carving. According to Jonas Rudzinskas, chairman of the Union of Lithuanian Folk Artists, " His responsible, sincere attitude towards creative work and unique style set Jakov Bunka apart from others and he joins the ranks of our greatest folk artists who set the development of folk art."

== Exhibits ==
In 2018, Bunka's work was displayed at Lithuanian National UNESCO Commission gallery, to the 95th anniversary of his birth.
