= Plungė =

- City
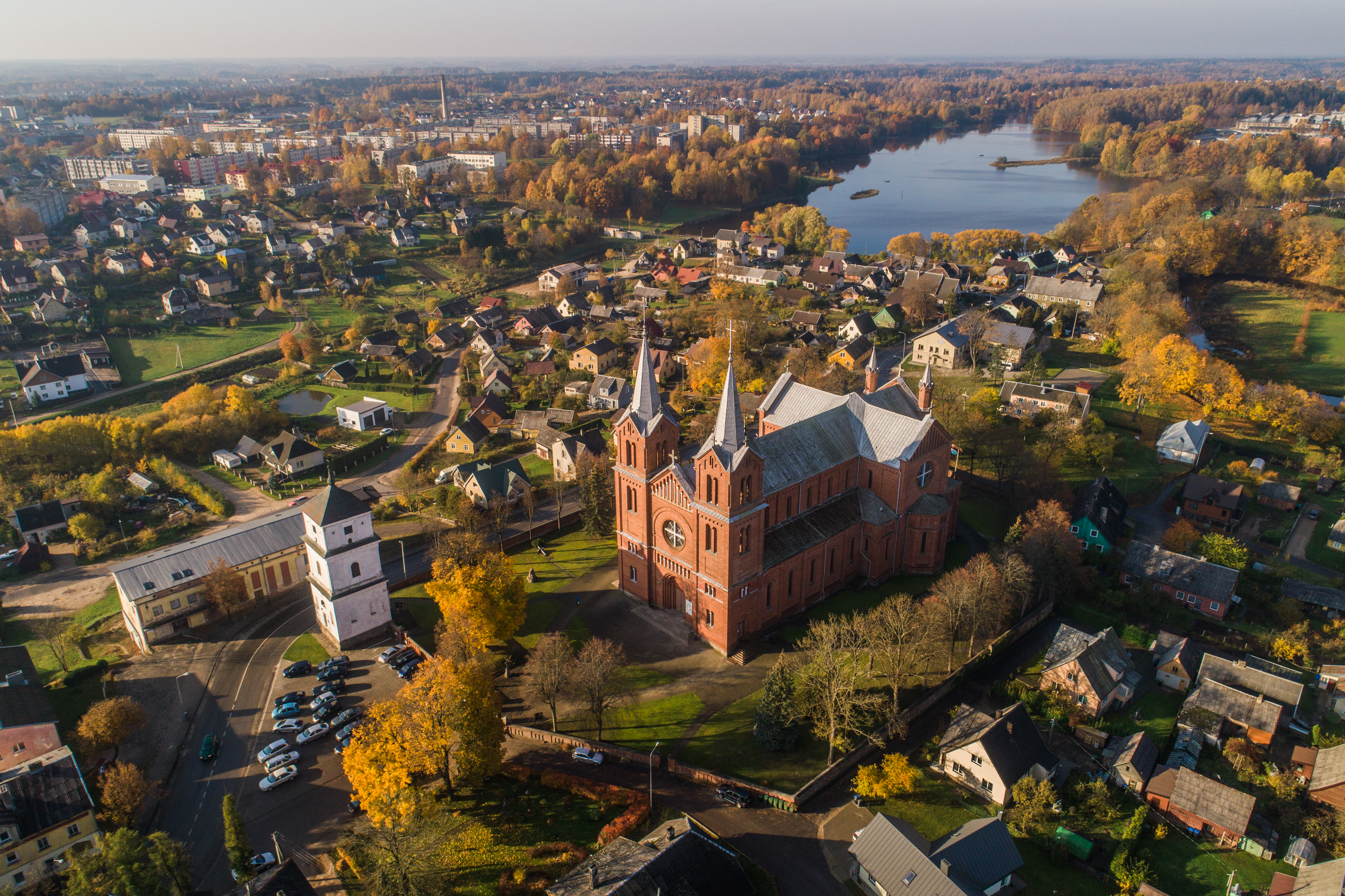
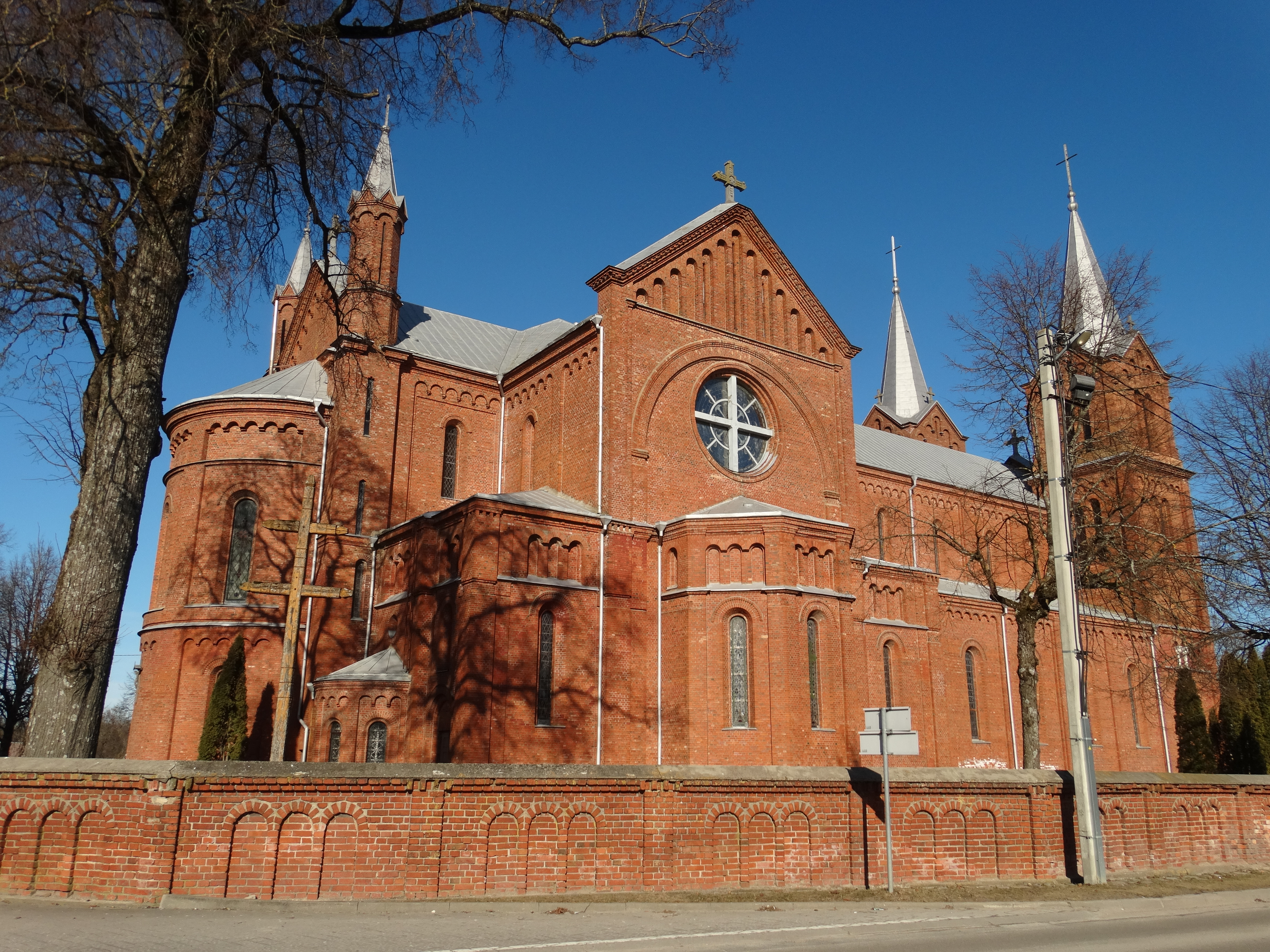
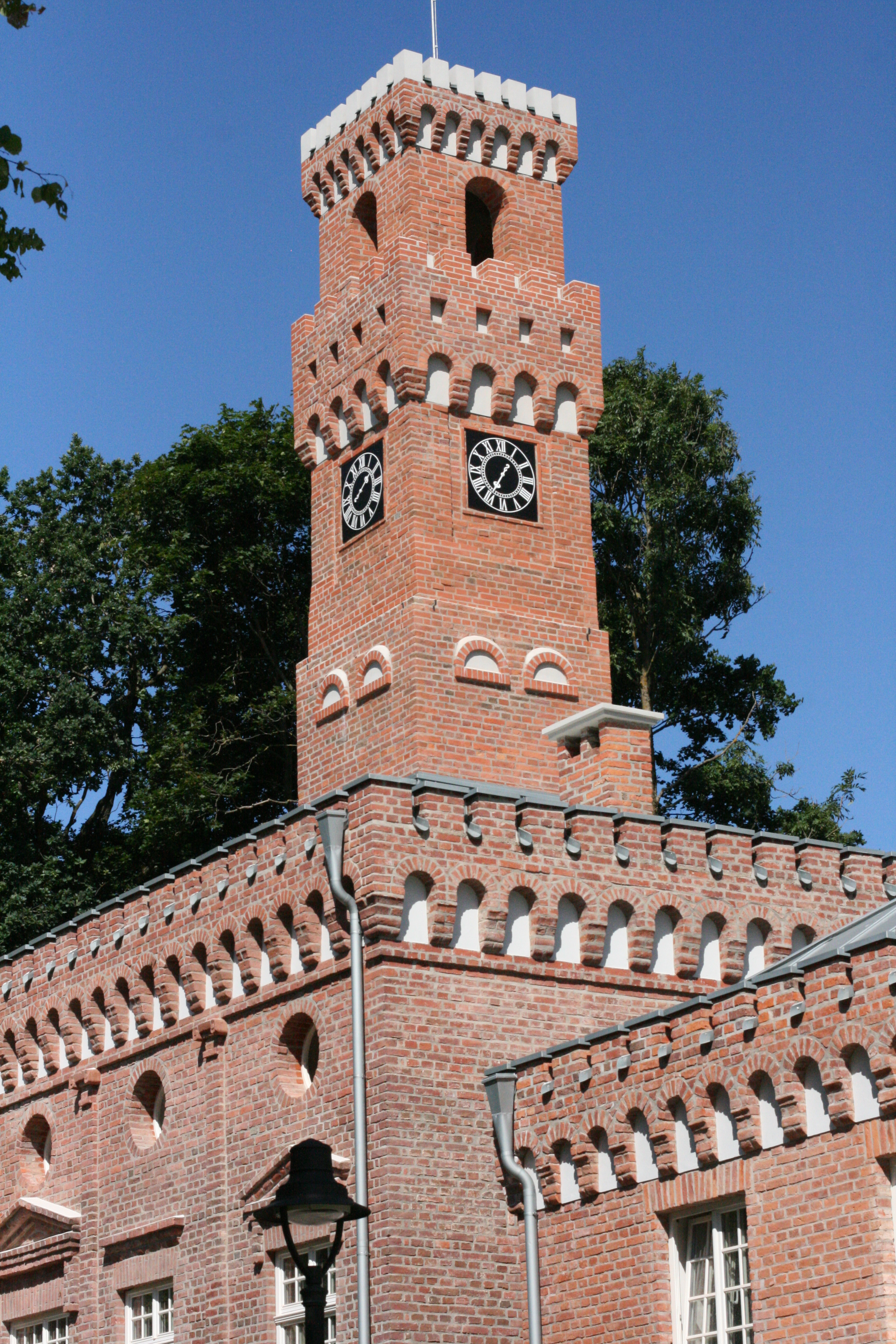
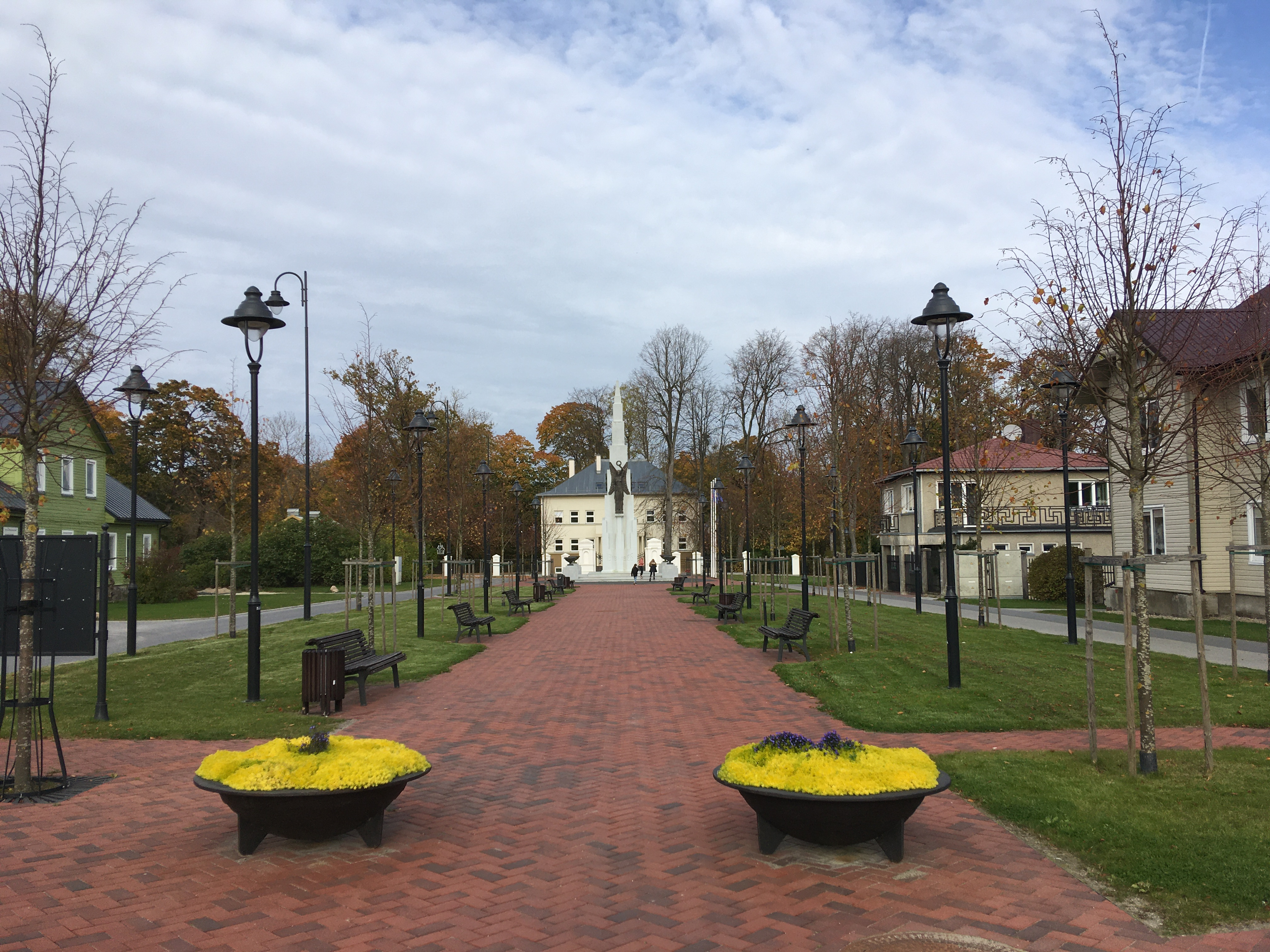
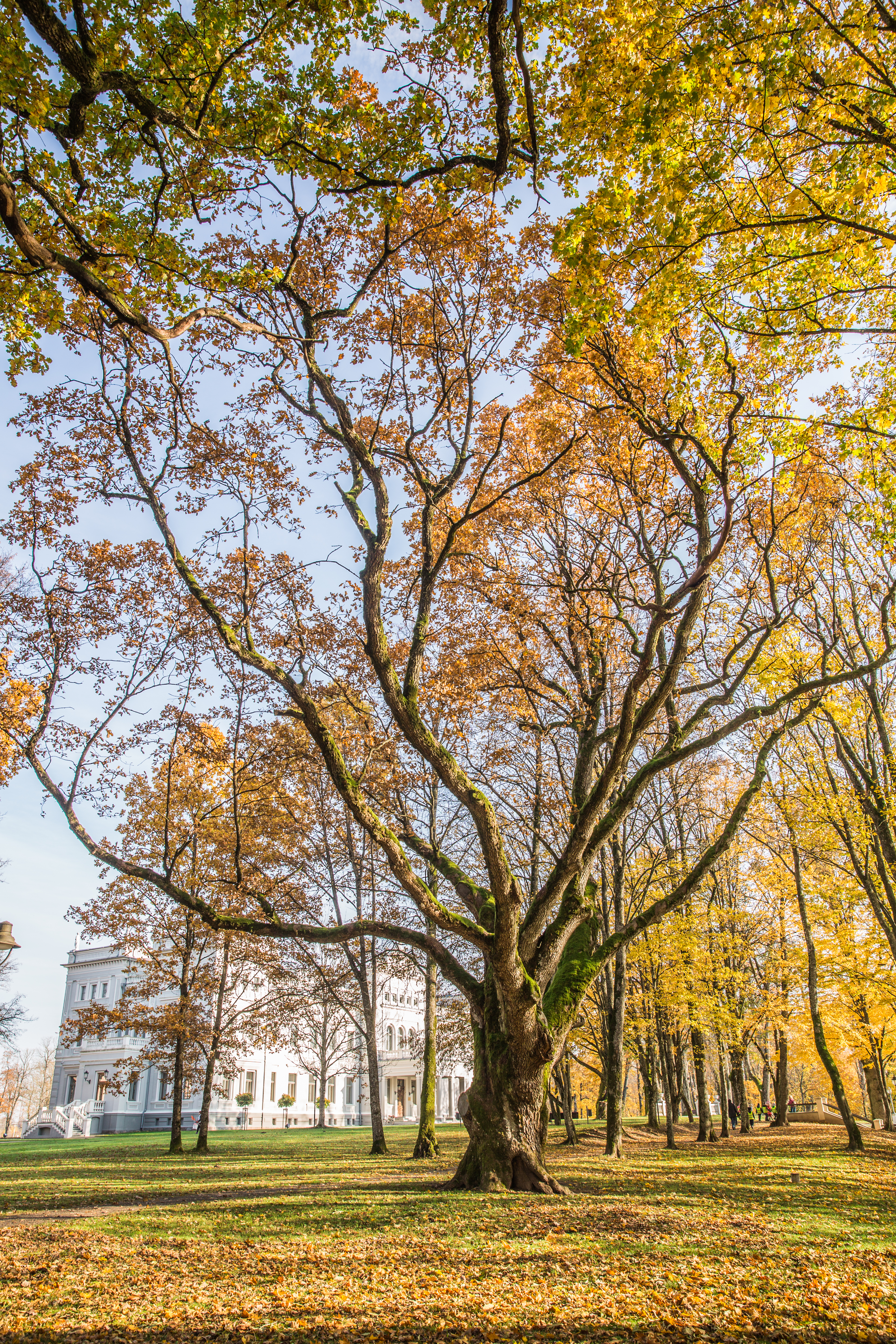
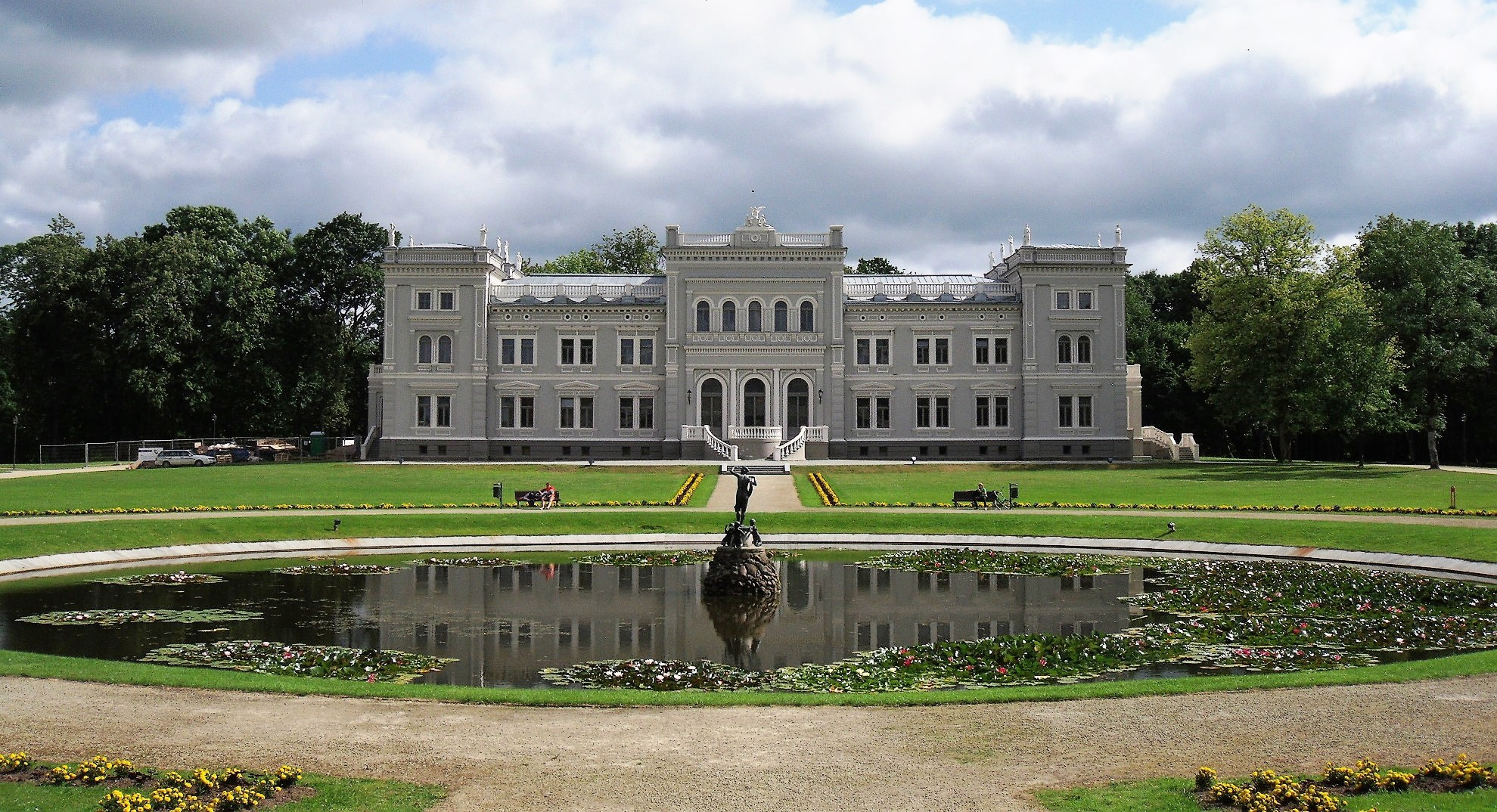
- Aerial view of Plungė Church of St. John the Baptist Clock tower of the Plungė Library Liberty Boulevard with the Independence Monument Perkūnas Oak Façade of the Plungė Manor and fountain

- Flag Coat of arms

- Location of Plungė
- Coordinates: 55°55′N 21°51′E
- Country: Lithuania
- Ethnographic region: Samogitia
- County: Telšiai County
- Municipality: Plungė district municipality
- Eldership: Plungė town eldership
- Capital of: Plungė district municipality Plungė town eldership Plungė rural eldership
- First mentioned: 1567
- Granted city rights: 1792

Population (2023)
  - Total: 17,252
- Demonym(s): Plungian(s) (English), plungiečiai or plungiškiai (Lithuanian)
- Time zone: UTC+2 (EET)
  - Summer (DST): UTC+3 (EEST)
- Website: plunge.lt

Plungė (Samogitian: Plongė; Polish: Płungiany) is a city in Lithuania with 17,252 inhabitants as of 2023. Plunge is the capital of the Plungė District Municipality, which has 33,251 inhabitants as of 2022. Two parts of the city are separated by the Babrungas River with two bridges crossing over it.

Plungė is known for Plungė Manor and its park, where the Samogitian Art Museum is located. In the Oginskiai manor park stands the Perkūnas oak natural monument. The Plungė lourdes grotto of Plungė was created in 1905 and attracts visitors. In the center of Plungė stands a monument for the 10th anniversary of regaining the independence of Lithuania and a sculpture of Saint Florian built by the Lithuanian book carrier Kazys Barzdys.

The city has a crab stick factory which exports to many countries in Europe.

== History ==
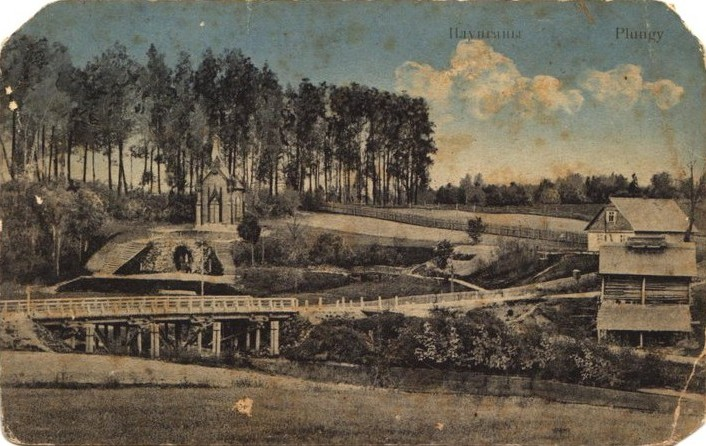
Lourdes grotto of Plungė in the early 20th century

It is thought that the territory where Plungė is situated was inhabited in 5th–1st centuries BC. After the Treaty of Melno, county seats were established in the forests of Samogitia. From the 14th century to the middle of the 16th century, Plungė was part of the Gandinga district as an ordinary settlement. Later, the population of Plungė started to grow faster and surpassed the population of Gandinga. In 1567, Plungė was first mentioned as a town. It was located in the Duchy of Samogitia in the Grand Duchy of Lithuania within the Polish–Lithuanian Commonwealth.

On January 13, 1792, Plungė was granted Magdeburg rights. From 1806 to 1873, Plungė belonged to Platon Zubov, and later – to the Ogiński family, who built a palace here in 1879.

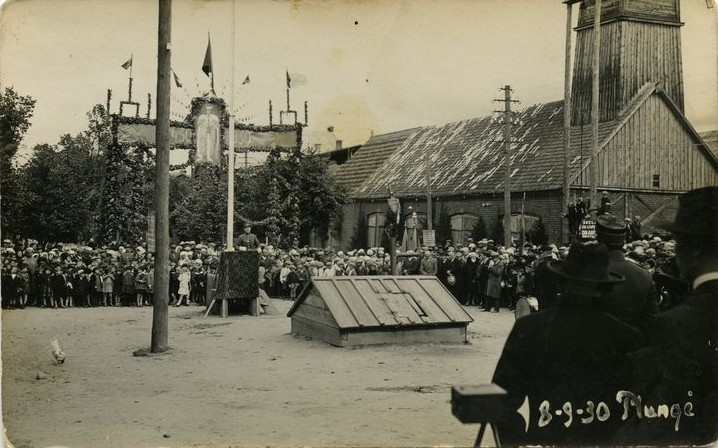
Commemoration of the 500th anniversary of the death of Vytautas the Great in Plungė in 1930

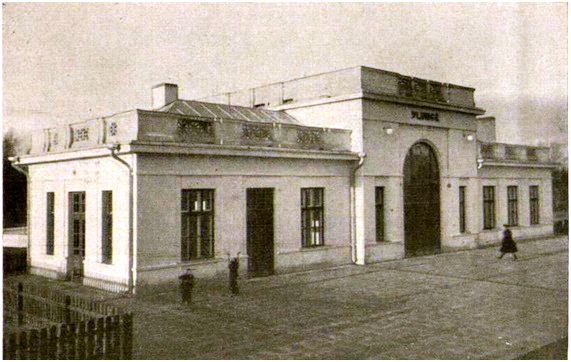
Railway station in 1930

During the interwar period a gymnasium was established in 1925, and a railway branch-line was built in 1932. In 1933, the current Catholic Church was consecrated. Since the private hospital was founded in 1939, maternity and surgical sections started operations in the city. Lithuanian Jews were active in the town's government and comprised around half of Plungė's inhabitants leading up to the Holocaust in Lithuania.

During the 1941 June Uprising in Lithuania and the German invasion as part of Operation Barbarossa, Plungė was captured by German forces on June 25, 1941. Lithuanian nationalists, led by Jonas Noreika, seized control and formed a town administration and police force. German forces killed 60 young Jewish men, accused by the Lithuanians of being a rear guard for the Red Army, shortly after the town's capture. On June 26, 1941, the day after the Germans' arrival in Plungė, Lithuanian forces moved the town's Jews into a makeshift ghetto, while carrying out beatings, torture, murders and forcing Jews to perform heavy labor. On 13 or 15 July in the Plungė massacre, the Lithuanian nationalists transported Jewish men, women and children to ditches near the village of Kausenai where they were shot. Of the 1,700 Jews living in Plungė in 1939, very few survived and often those who were victims of the Soviet deportations from Lithuania prior to the Holocaust. Remembrance sites for the events of 1941 exist in and around the town. The Jewish holocaust survivor and sculptor Jacob Bunka was one of the town's few Jews to survive the war.

During the interwar period, the years of the independence of Lithuania, Plungė's economy was based on the factory of fibre flax and cotton Kučiskis – Pabedinskiai and also on the activities of Jewish businessmen and agricultural products made by Samogitian farmers.

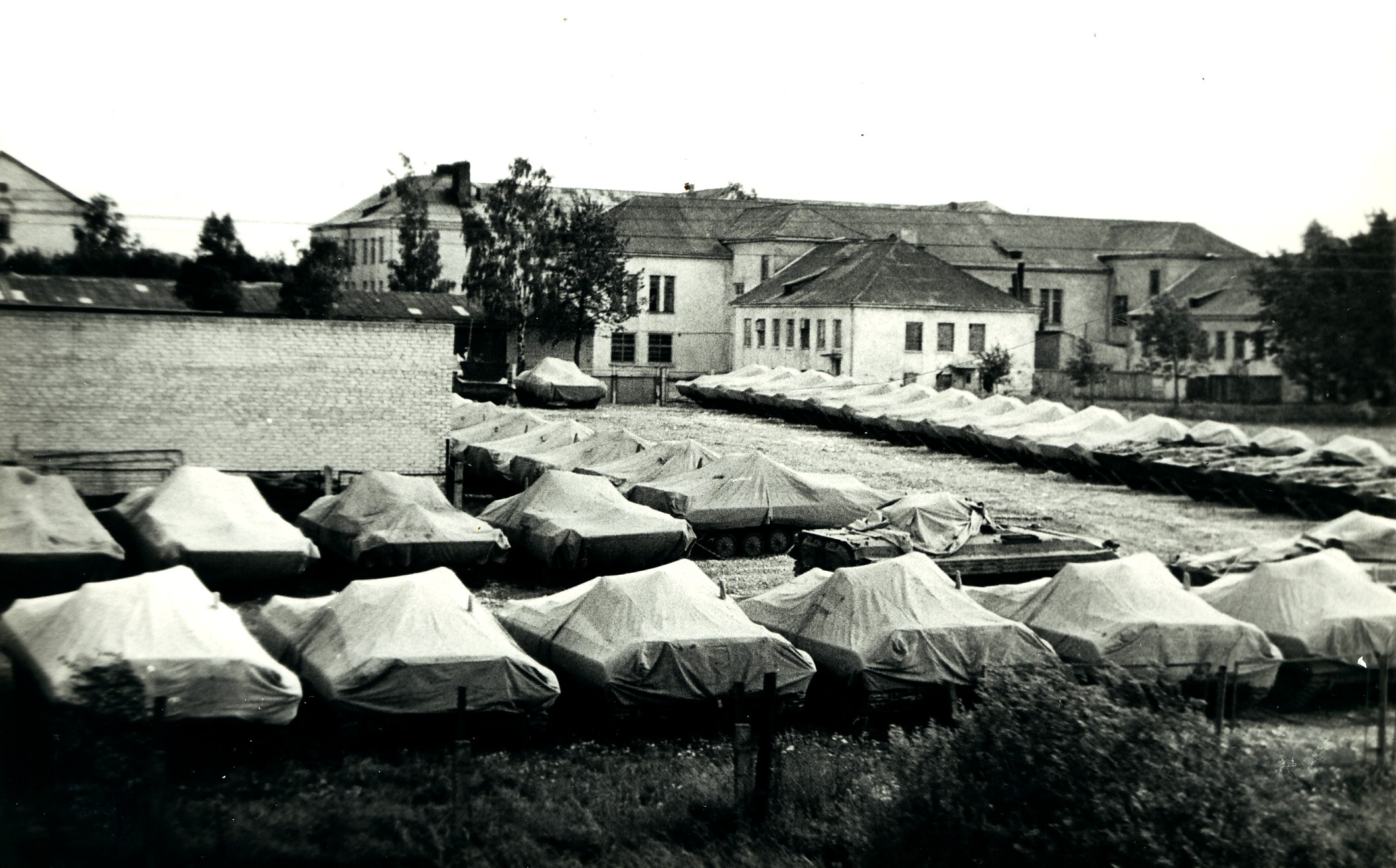
Soviet Army vehicles in Plungė in 1991, later the Soviet troops were withdrawn from Lithuania until 1993

After World War II and the Soviet occupation, Plungė started to grow rapidly – the city had 7,400 inhabitants in 1950, and by 1990 it had around 23,300 inhabitants. During the years of Soviet occupation, Lithuanians became the majority of the city's inhabitants. According to the Government's Resolution of 1963, Plungė was to become a regional centre with a strong industry. However, these plans didn't come to fruition as it became obvious that the city did not have enough water resources, although some companies were established in Plungė. However, most of these companies bankrupted after the independence of Lithuania was announced.

The coat of arms of Plungė was affirmed by the decree of the President on June 6, 1997. In 2009, Plungė was elected Lithuanian Capital of Culture. Today, Plungė is the sixteenth largest city of Lithuania having 17,252 inhabitants as of 2023.

=== Name ===
The origin of the name Plungė is not clear. One theory is that the name was given by a landowner, in which Plungė was in. Another theory is that the name comes from the river Paplunga, which flowed through the city.

The city's name is Płungiany in Polish, Plongė in Samogitian, and Plongian (פלונגיאן) in Yiddish. It was also historically known as Plungany (Плунгяны) in Russian.

== Main sights ==
- Plungė Manor
- Plungė District Municipal Public Library
- Plungė park
- St. John the Baptist Church
- St. Florian's sculpture
- Plokštinė missile base (Cold War Museum) near the city
- Litvak Remembrance Garden (monument to the Lithuanian Jews) near the city

=== Gallery ===
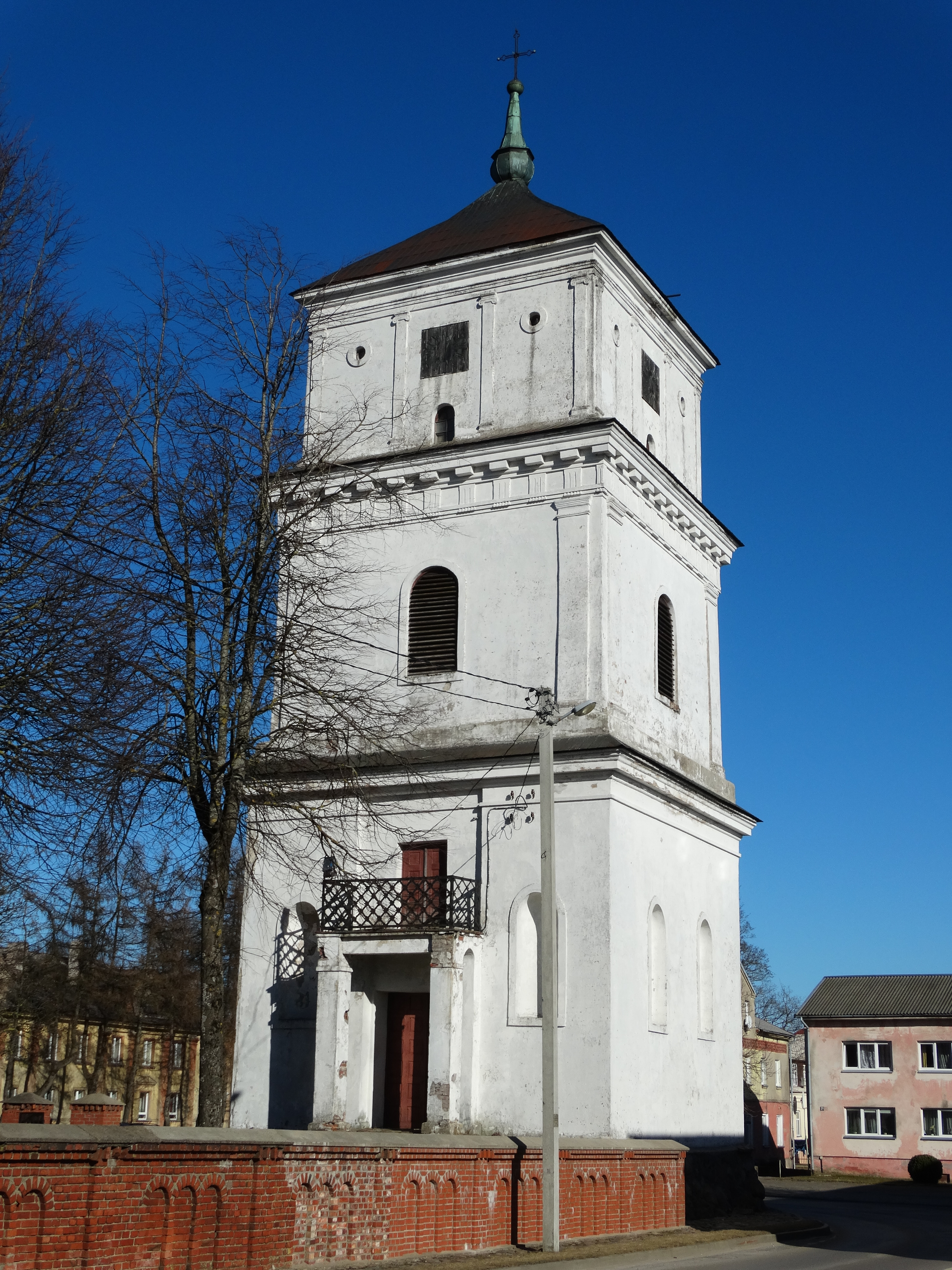
Bell tower

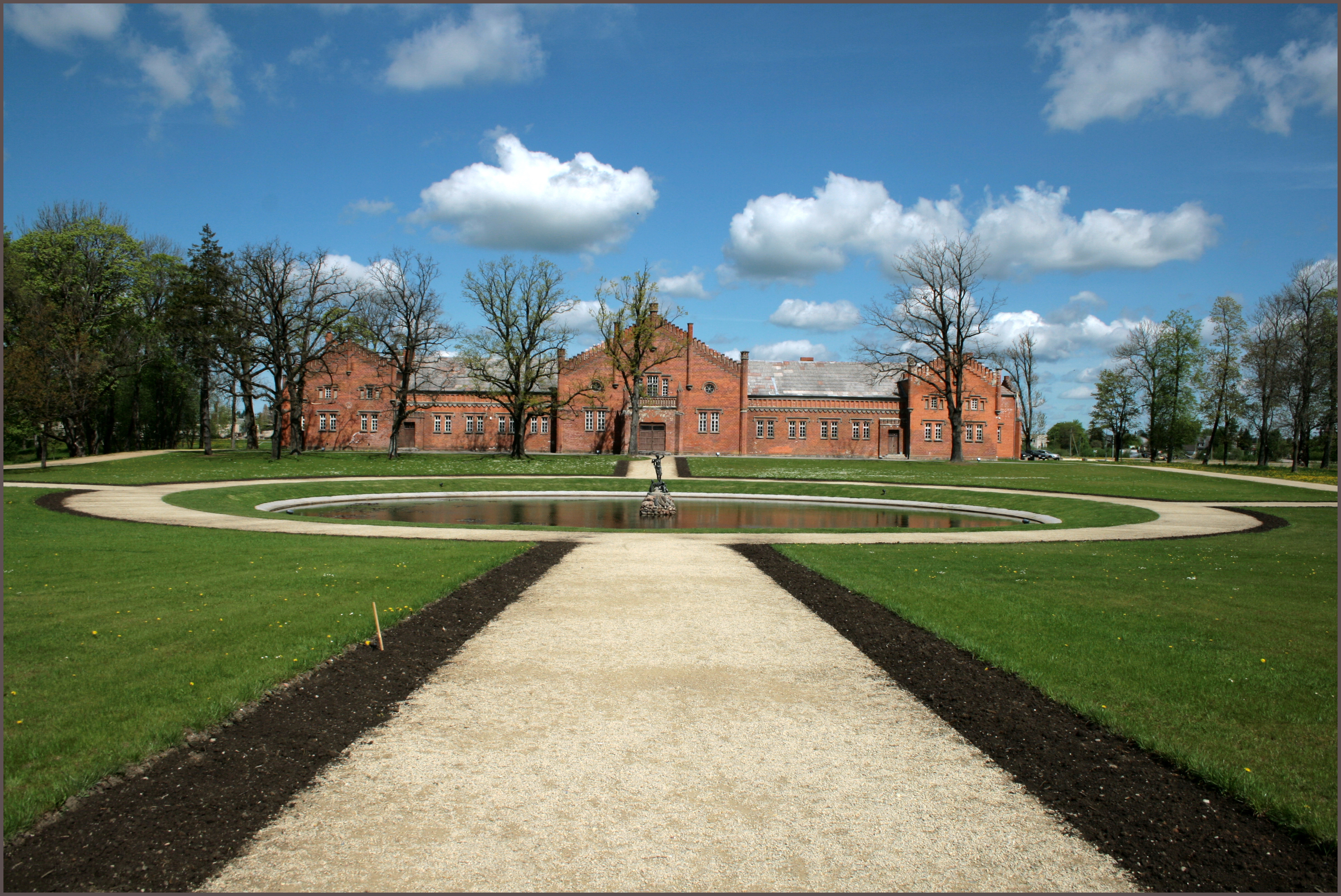
Stables of the Plungė Manor

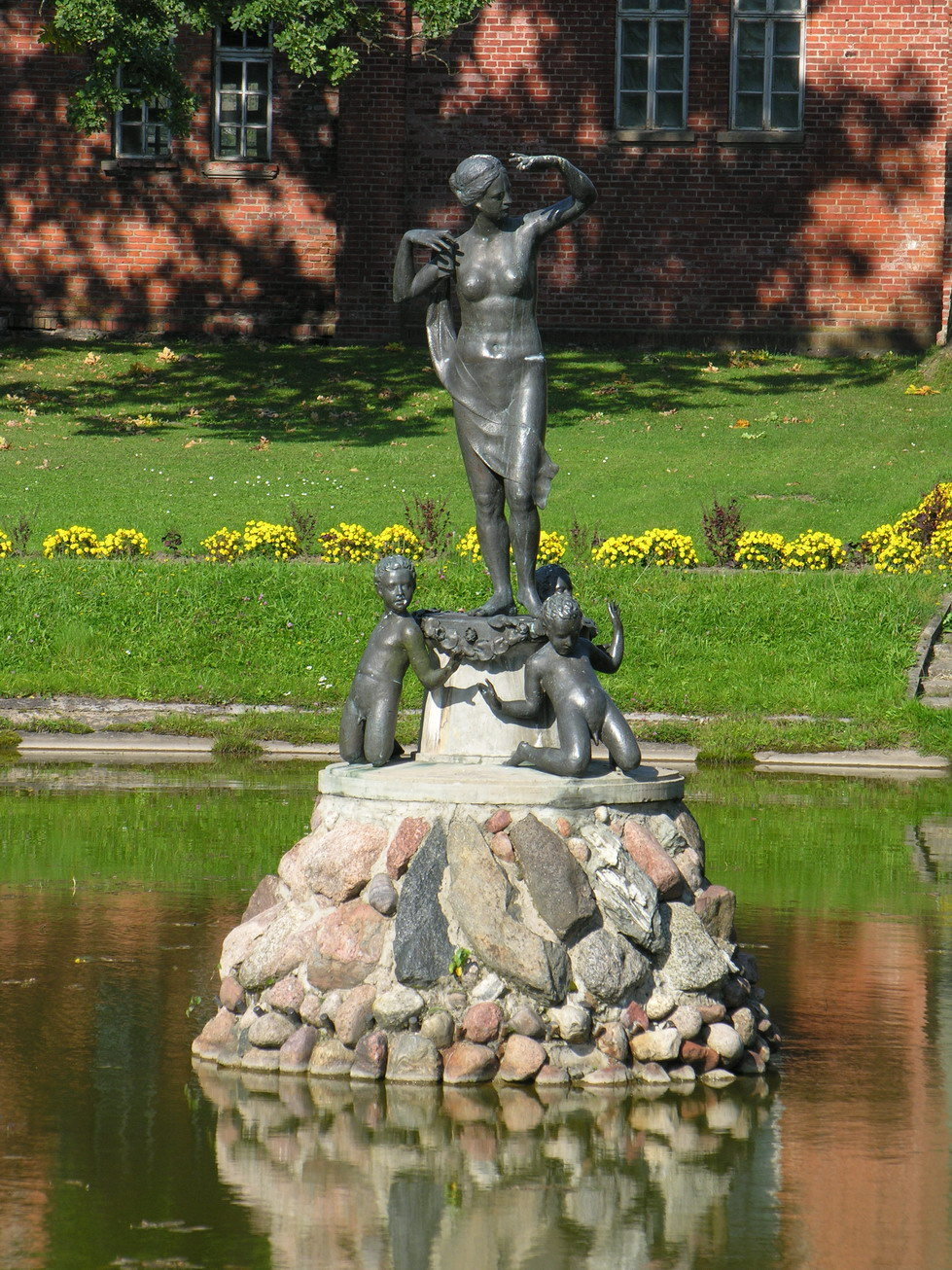
Fountain

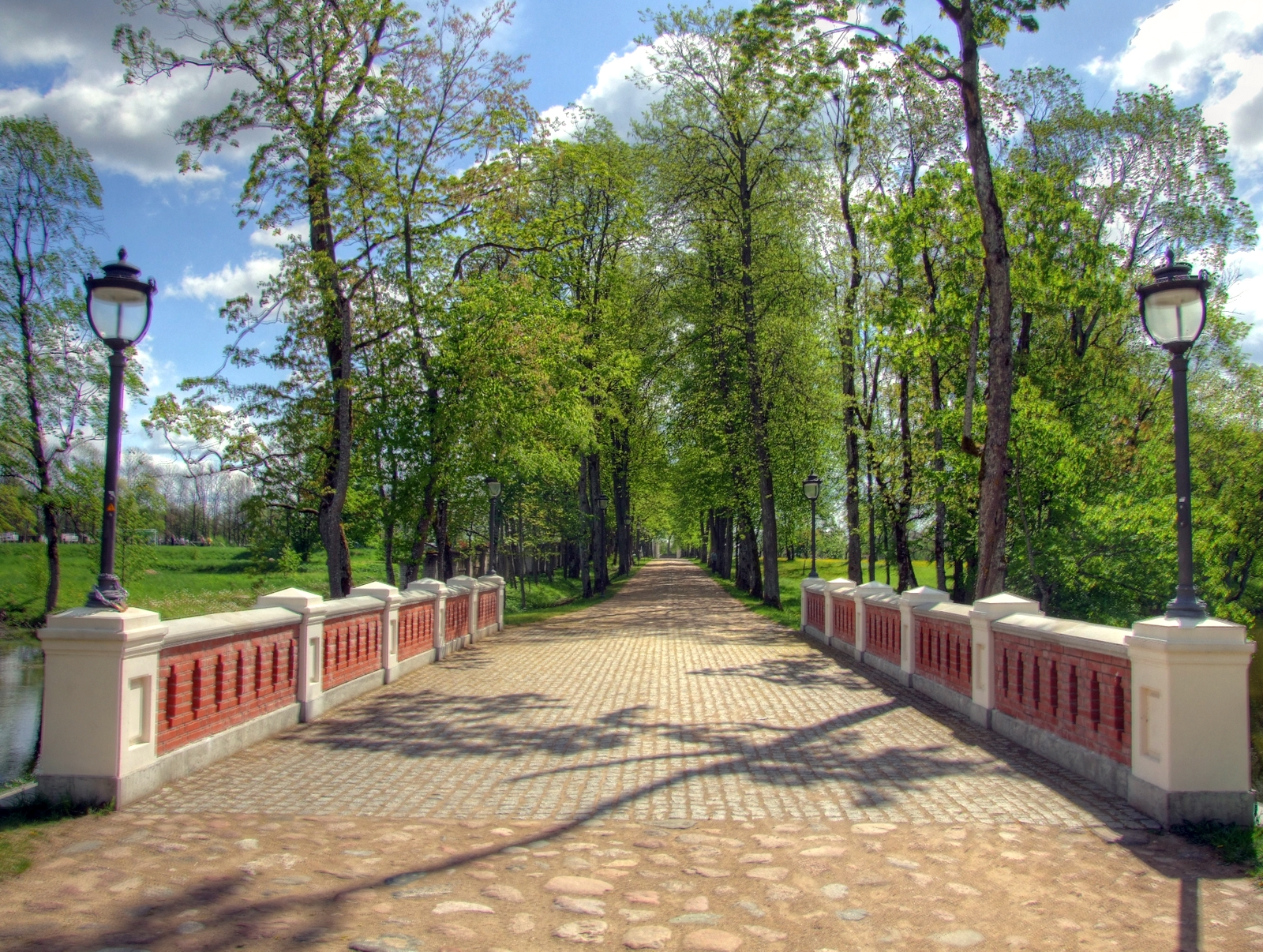
Park

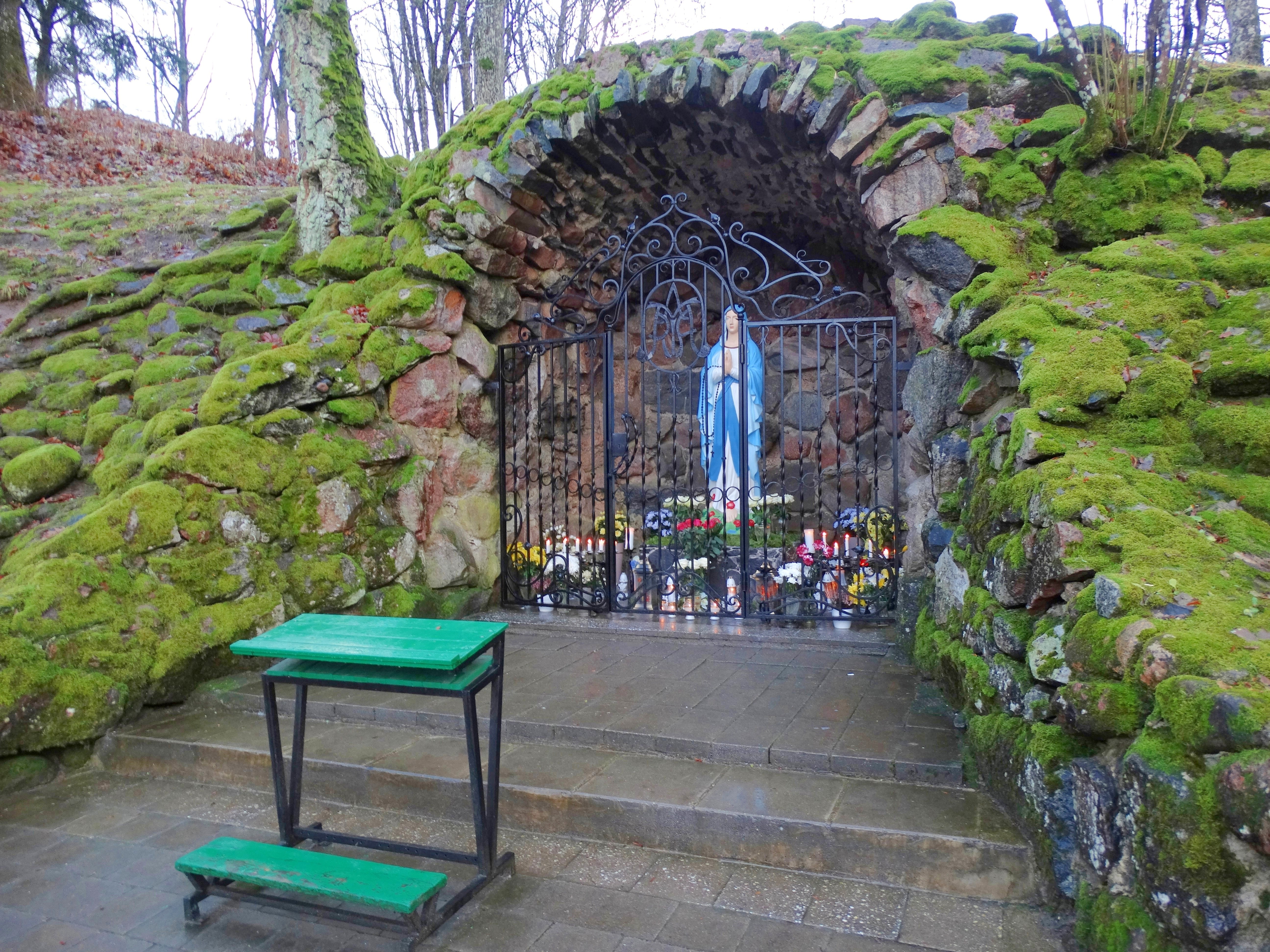
Plungė lourdes grotto

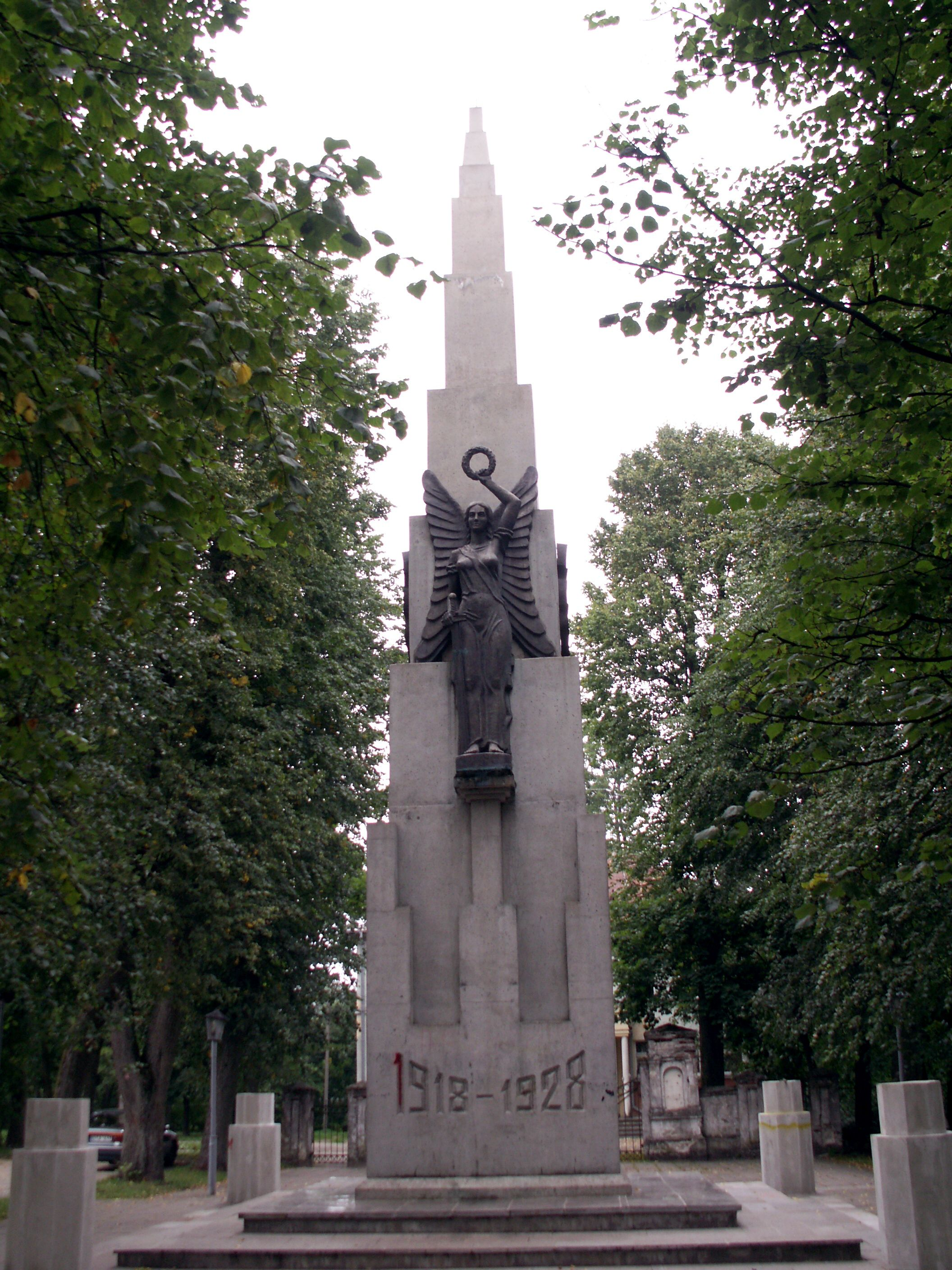
Monument "Freedom" (1928) destroyed during the Soviet occupation, restored in 1992

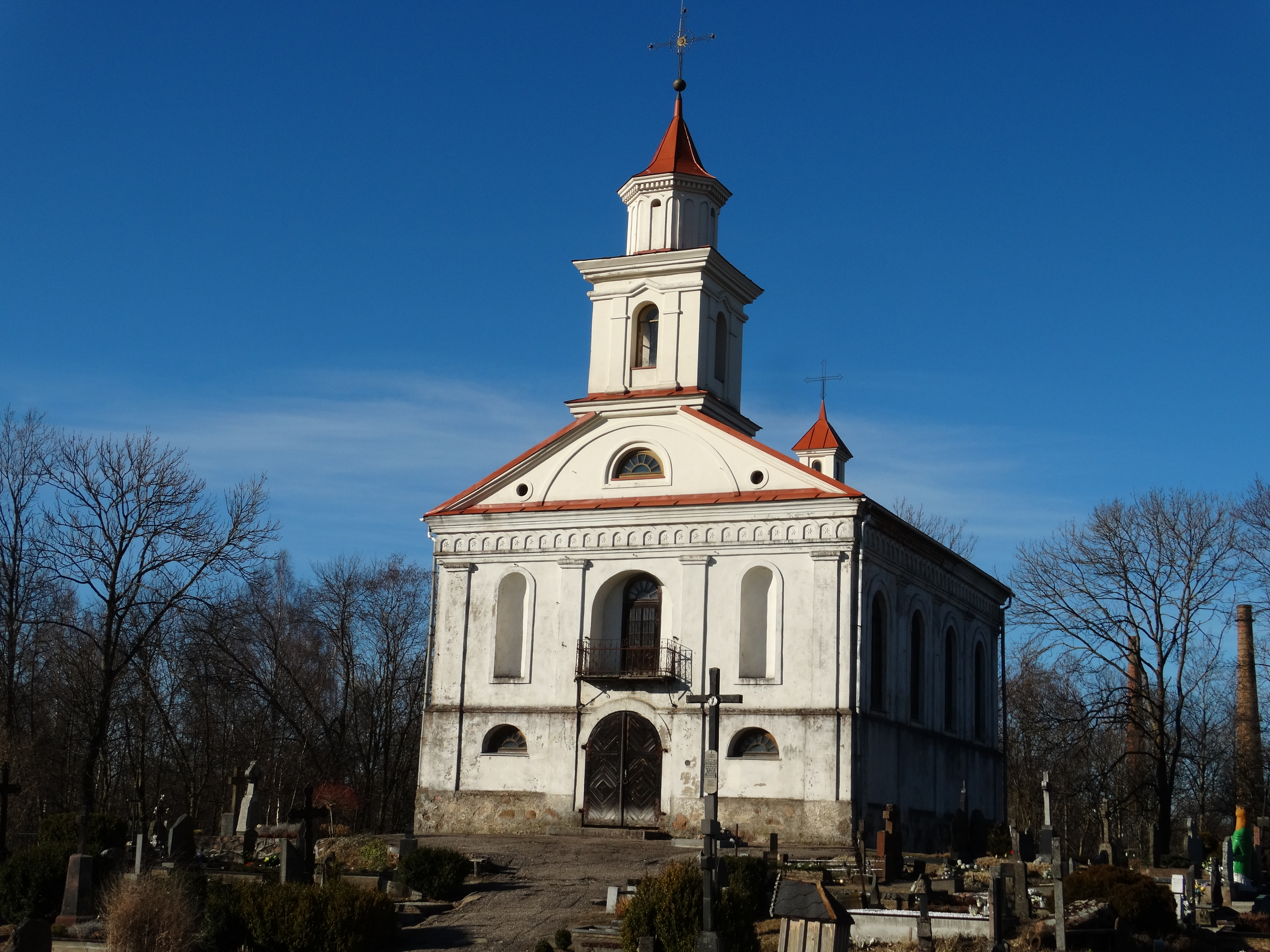
Plungė Cemetery Chapel

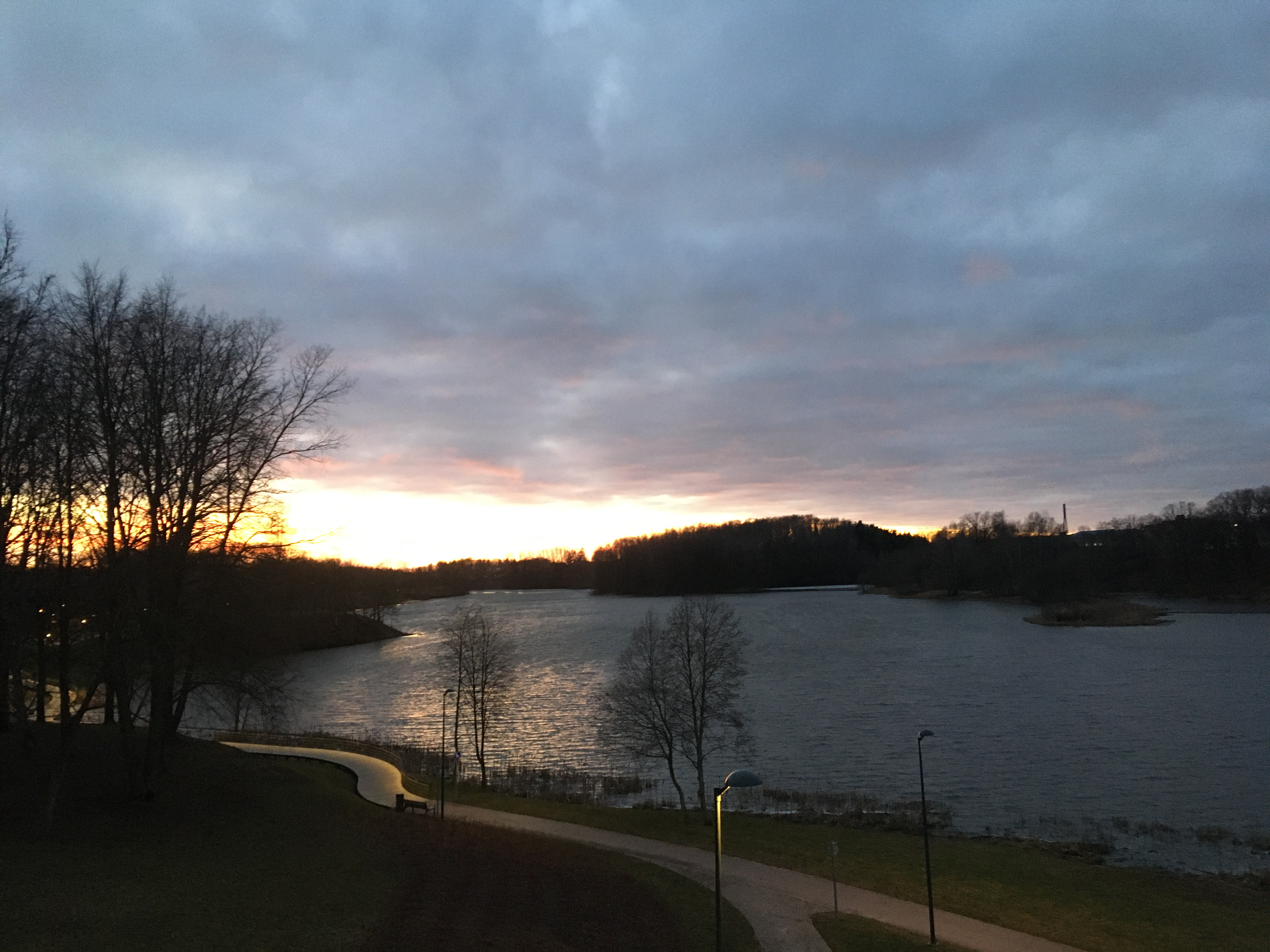
Plungė Reservoir

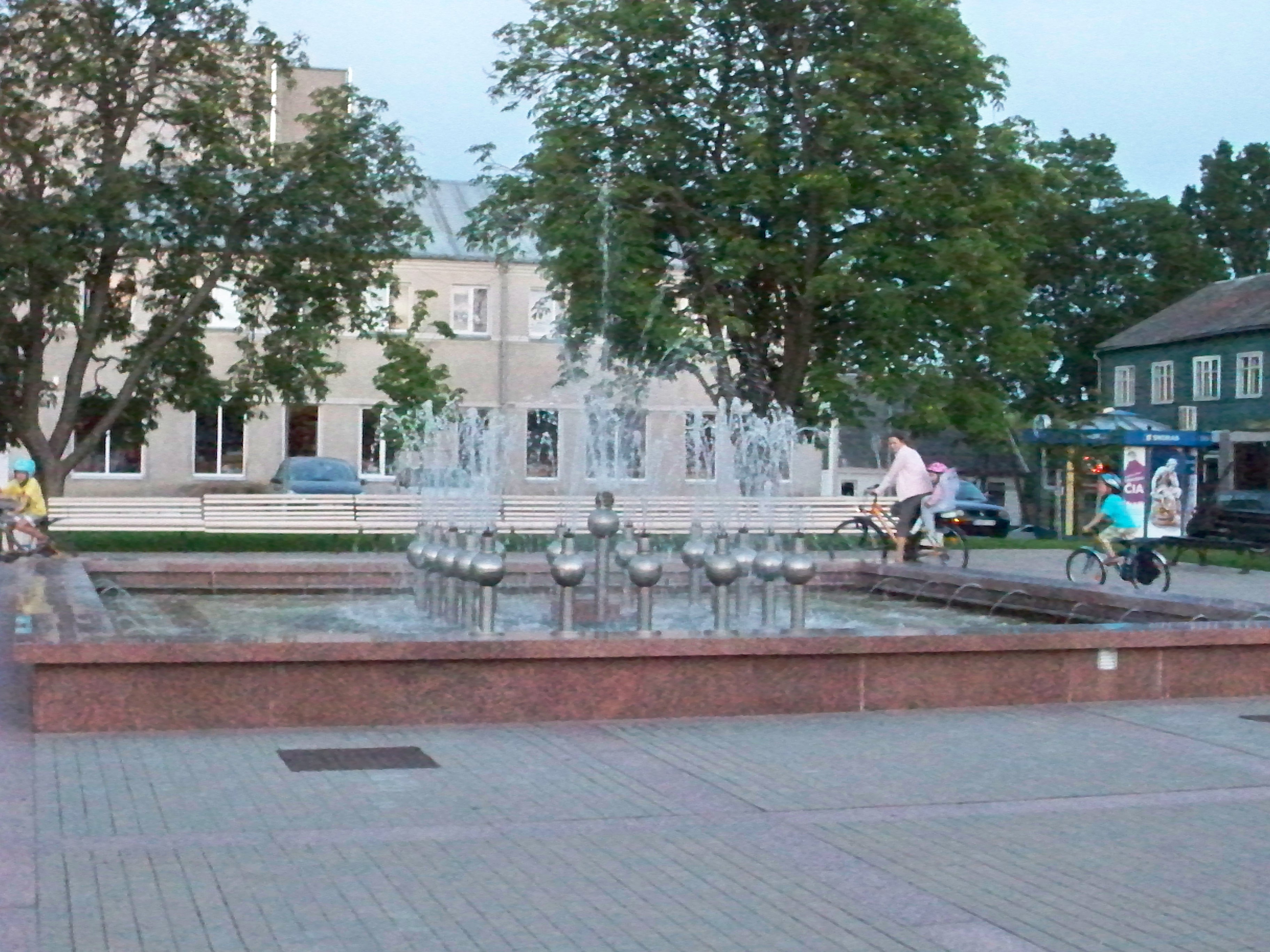
The Old Town Square

== Transport ==
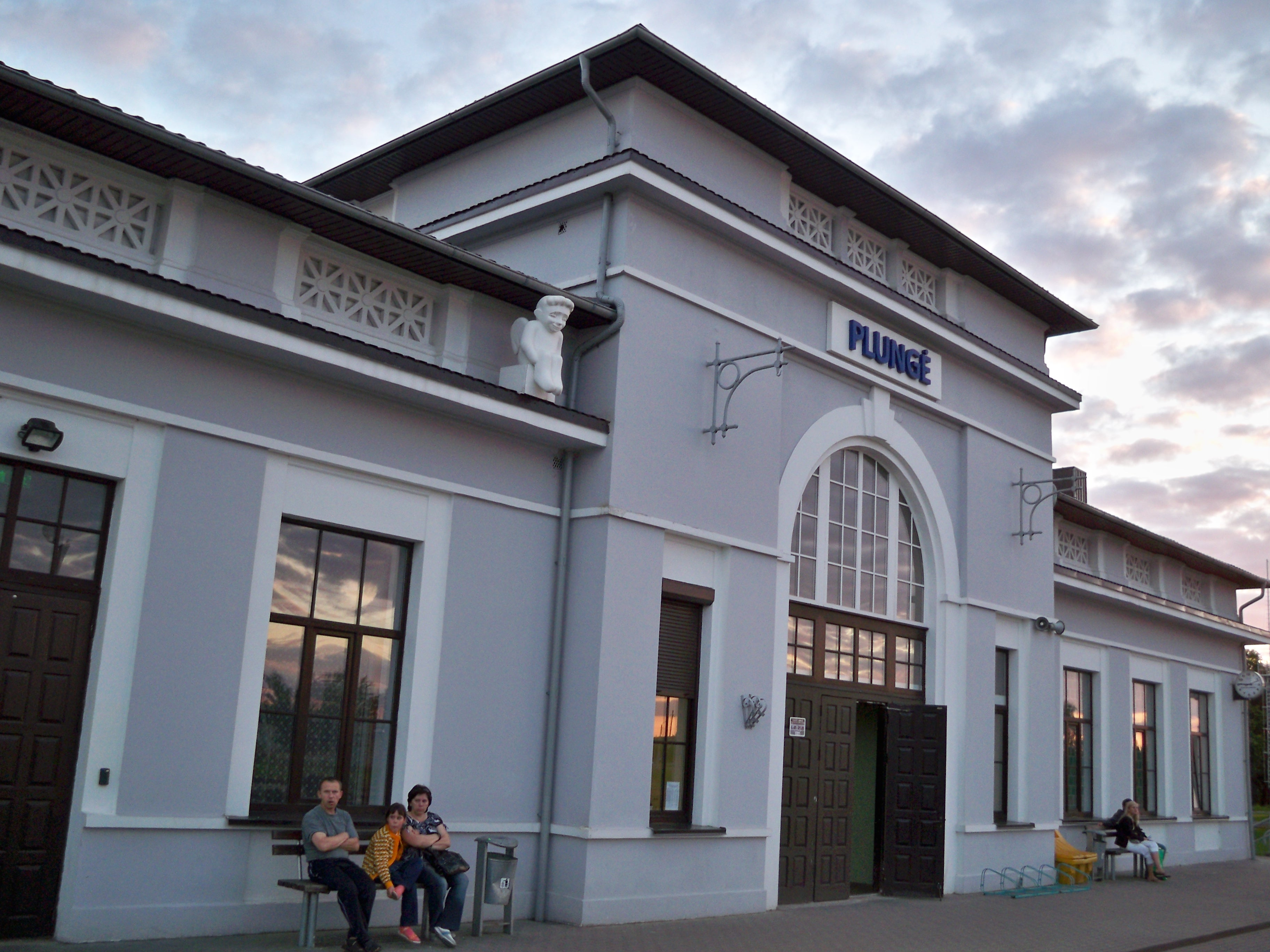
Plungė Railway Station

Highways near the city are:

- Highway A11 Šiauliai–Palanga
- Highway 164 Mažeikiai–Plungė–Tauragė
- Highway 166 Plungė–Vėžaičiai

The Plungė railway station, which was opened in 1932, offers public train transport to Vilnius–Klaipėda and Radviliškis–Klaipėda. The railway is ran and owned by the state-owned Lithuanian Railways.

Two bridges are constructed over the Babrungas River: the Plungė Gymnasium Bridge, which is dedicated for regular vehicles, and the Plungė Railroad Bridge, which is dedicated for trains.

== Sports ==
The football club FK Babrungas Plungė plays in the Lithuanian football championship "II Lyga". The team plays in the Central Stadium of Plungė, which is located near the Plungė Manor and Plungė Railway Station. The stadium, which was opened in 1939, can accommodate approximately 1,200 people today.

Today, the regional basketball club KK Olimpas plays in National Basketball League. The team was established in 1989. In 1997, BC Olimpas played in the Lithuanian Basketball League finals, where they lost to BC Žalgiris. Afterwards, the team did not appear in national competitions until 2011. KK Olimpas started to play in Regional Basketball League and won gold medals in 2012, qualifying for the National Basketball League. In 2012–2013, the National Basketball League's regular season team finished 3rd amongst 18 teams; however, it lost the quarter-finals series 2–0 to BC Žalgiris-2. Team plays in "SS Žemaitijos Suvenyras" arena, which has a capacity of 200 people.

== Twin towns – sister cities ==
Plungė is twinned with:

- Bjerkreim, Norway
- Boxholm, Sweden
- Bruntál, Czech Republic
- Golub-Dobrzyń, Poland
- Konotop, Ukraine
- (Georgia (country)) Kvareli, Georgia
- Menden, Germany
- Tukums, Latvia
- Viljandi County, Estonia

Former twin towns (until 2022):

- Krasnogorsky District, Russia

== Famous residents ==
- Chaim Yitzchak Bloch Hacohen was born there and later served as Rosh Yeshivah.
- Jacob Bunka, folk artist and creator of Holocaust memorials.
- M. K. Čiurlionis (1875–1911), Lithuanian composer and artist, lived there
- Lazarus Goldschmidt (Plungė, 1871–1950), translator of the Talmud
- Historian Zenonas Ivinskis (Plungė, 1908–1971) was born there
- Jurgita Jurkutė (Plungė, 1985), Miss Lithuania 2007, was born there
- Bronislovas Lubys (1938–2011), entrepreneur, former Prime Minister of Lithuania, signatory of the Act of the Re-Establishment of the State of Lithuania, and businessman
- Renatas Norkus, former Lithuanian ambassador to the United Kingdom.
- Wanda Rutkiewicz (1943–1992), a mountaineer, the first European woman to reach the summit of Mount Everest and the first female climber to reach K2
- Aistė Smilgevičiūtė (Plungė, 1977), singer, was born there
- Petras Vyšniauskas, Jazz saxophonist, was born and grew up there
