= List of libraries in Lithuania =

This is a list of libraries in Lithuania.

== Libraries by county ==
=== Alytus ===
- Alytus District Municipality Public Library
- Varėna District Municipality Public Library

=== Kaunas ===
- Kaunas County Public Library
- Kaunas University of Technology Library
- Library of Jonava
- Lithuanian Sports University Library, Kaunas
- Vytautas Magnus University Library, Kaunas

=== Klaipėda ===
- Klaipėda City Municipality Immanuel Kant Public Library
- Klaipėda County Ieva Simonaitytė Public Library
- Klaipeda University Library

=== Marijampolė ===
- Marijampolė Petras Kriaučiūnas Public Library
- Šakiai Public Library

=== Panevėžys ===
- Panevėžys County Gabrielė Petkevičaitė-Bitė Public Library
- Pasvalys Marius Katiliškis Public Library

=== Šiauliai ===
- Jonas Avyžius Public Library
- Šiauliai County Povilas Višinskis Public Library

=== Tauragė ===
- Jurbarkas District Municipality Public Library
- Šilalė Public Library
- Tauragė District Municipality Birutė Baltrušaitytė Public Library

=== Telšiai ===
- Plungė District Municipal Public Library, Telšiai
- Telšiai District Municipality Karolina Praniauskaitė Public Library

=== Utena ===
- Utena A. and M. Miškiniai Public Library

=== Vilnius ===
- Lithuanian Library for the Blind, Vilnius
- Martynas Mažvydas National Library of Lithuania
- Vilnius County Adamas Mickevičius Public Library
- Vilnius University Library
- Wroblewski Library of the Lithuanian Academy of Sciences

== See also ==
- History of archives of Lithuania
- Lithuanian literature
- Mass media in Lithuania

in other languages

- Copyright in Lithuania (in Russian)
- Legal deposit in Lithuania (in Lithuanian)
- Lithuanian libraries (in Lithuanian)
- Lithuanian Research Library Consortium (in Lithuanian)
