= Joniškis =

- City
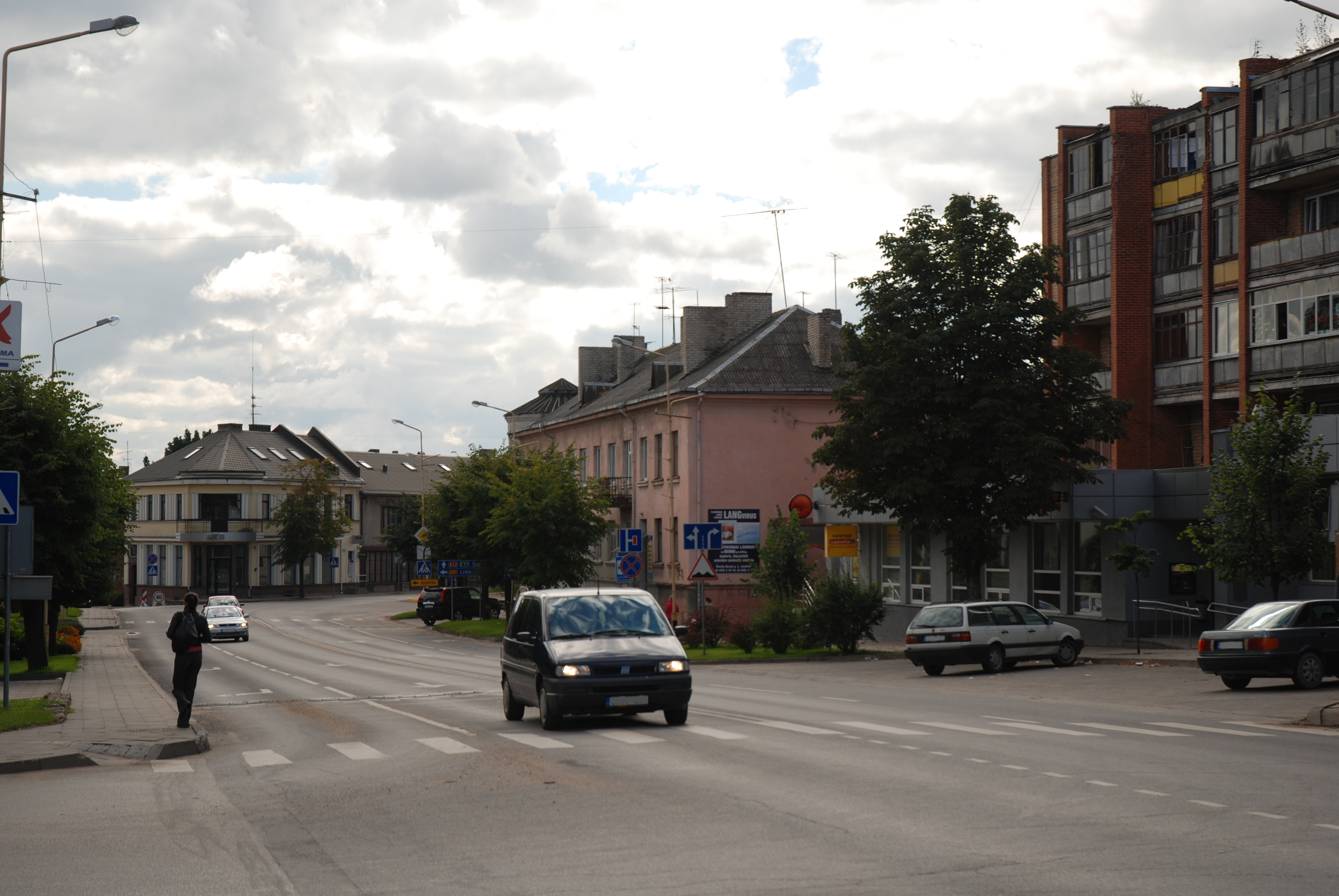

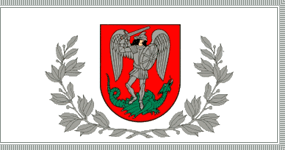
- Flag Coat of arms

- Location of Joniškis
- Coordinates: 56°14′0″N 23°36′0″E
- Country: Lithuania
- Ethnographic region: Aukštaitija
- County: Šiauliai County
- Municipality: Joniškis District Municipality
- Eldership: Joniškis eldership
- Capital of: Joniškis District Municipality; Joniškis eldership
- First mentioned: 1526
- Granted city rights: 1616

Government
  - Mayor: Vitalijus Gailius

Population (2022)
  - Total: 8,455
- Time zone: UTC+2 (EET)
  - Summer (DST): UTC+3 (EEST)
- Website: joniskis.lt

Joniškis (Samogitian: Juonėškis; Polish: Janiszki) is a city in northern Lithuania with a population of about 9,900. It is located 39 kilometers north of Šiauliai and 14 kilometers south of the Lithuania–Latvia border. Joniškis is the municipal and administrative centre of Joniškis district municipality.

== Name ==
Joniškis is the Lithuanian name of the town. Historical versions of the name in other languages include Polish: Janiszki, Russian: Янишки Yanishki, Yiddish: יאַנישאָק Yanishok, Latvian: Jānišķe, and German: Jonischken.

== History ==
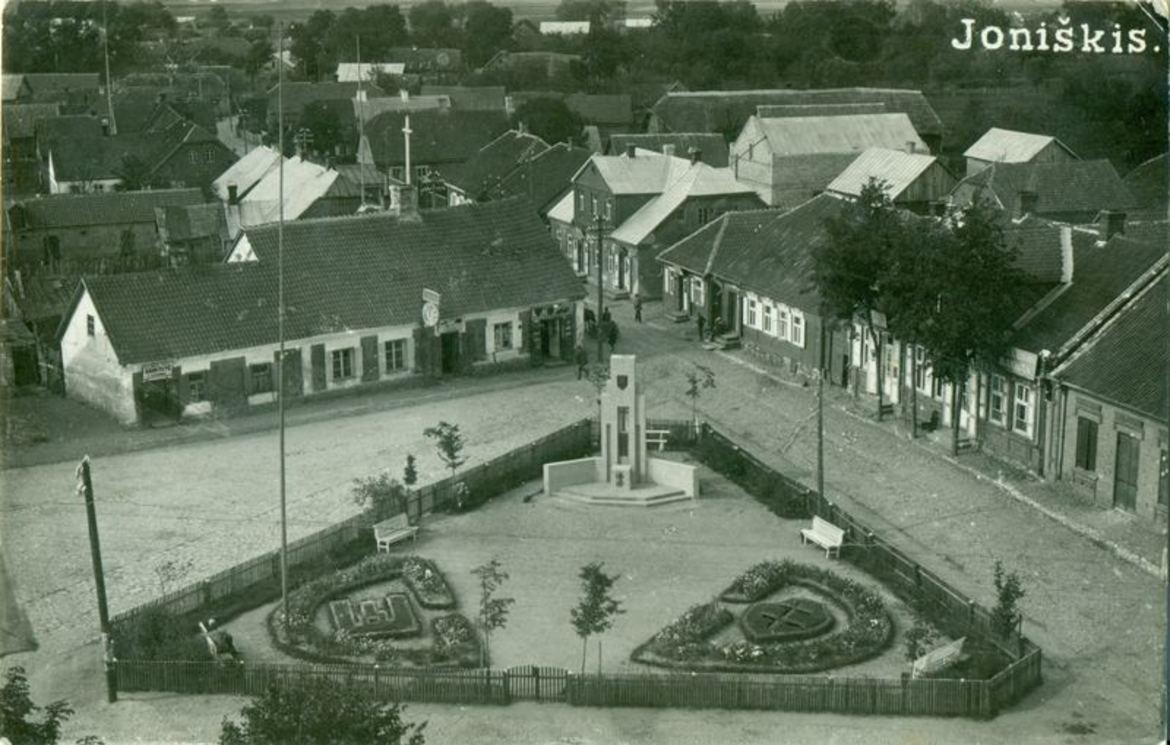
Independence Square in 1929 with the Columns of Gediminas and the Jagiellonian Cross

Joniškis was established in the beginning of the 16th century. It was mentioned in written sources on 23 February 1536 when Bishops of Vilnius and Samogitia visited the area and found that people still practiced the old pagan faith. People were worshiping the God of Thunder (Perkūnas), fire, snakes and other pagan deities. The bishop of Vilnius, John of the Lithuanian Dukes baptized the locals and established a new parish on 23 February 1536. A wooden church was built and the town of Joniškis was built around it. The bishop of Vilnius named the town Joniškis after his own name Jonas. Joniškis was on the crossroad of important trade roads. It was located in the Duchy of Samogitia in the Grand Duchy of Lithuania within the Polish–Lithuanian Commonwealth.

During World War II, the town was under Soviet occupation from 1940, and then under German occupation from 1941 to 1944. In late 1941, 148 Jewish men were shot near Joniškis in the nearby forest. The remaining Jews (men, women and children) were murdered in the forest in September 1941. 493 people were murdered in total by an Einsatzgruppen of Joniškis policemen and Lithuanian nationalists supervised by the Germans.

== Infrastructure ==
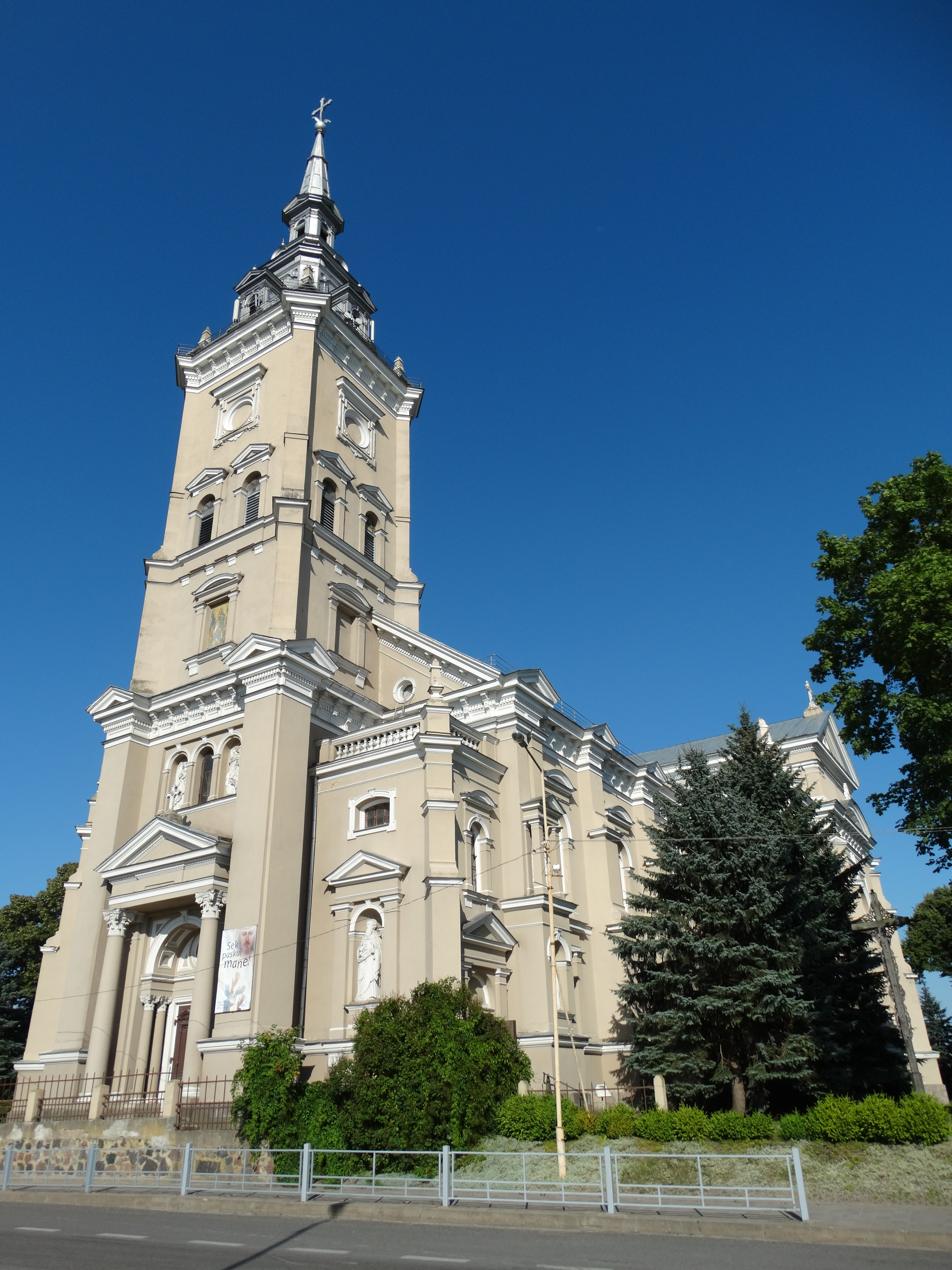
Joniškis church

With the Church of the Accession of the Holy Virgin Mary (founded in 1901) and a complex of two Jewish synagogues – the Red and White Synagogues, built in 1897 and 1823, respectively – at its center, the town has the status of an urban architectural heritage site.

A railway line connecting Riga and Šiauliai runs along the western boundary of the town. West of the railway are the town's allotment gardens, the Lutheran Cemetery and the Cemetery for the Victims of World War II. Joniškis has two water reservoirs formed by dams on the River Sidabra. Joniškis has the Jonas Avyžius Public Library of Joniškis District Municipality, the Basketball Museum and a large animal compound feed manufacturing plant "Joniškio Grūdai".

== Climate ==
Joniškis has a warm-summer humid continental climate (Dfb in the Köppen climate classification).

Climate data for Joniškis
| Month | Jan | Feb | Mar | Apr | May | Jun | Jul | Aug | Sep | Oct | Nov | Dec | Year |
|---|---|---|---|---|---|---|---|---|---|---|---|---|---|
| Mean daily maximum °C (°F) | −1.4 (29.5) | −0.4 (31.3) | 4.5 (40.1) | 11.6 (52.9) | 17.2 (63.0) | 20.2 (68.4) | 22.7 (72.9) | 21.6 (70.9) | 16.9 (62.4) | 10.1 (50.2) | 5 (41) | 1.2 (34.2) | 10.8 (51.4) |
| Daily mean °C (°F) | −3.5 (25.7) | −2.9 (26.8) | 0.8 (33.4) | 7 (45) | 12.7 (54.9) | 16.2 (61.2) | 18.8 (65.8) | 17.8 (64.0) | 13.3 (55.9) | 7.5 (45.5) | 3.3 (37.9) | −0.4 (31.3) | 7.5 (45.6) |
| Mean daily minimum °C (°F) | −5.8 (21.6) | −5.7 (21.7) | −2.8 (27.0) | 2.1 (35.8) | 7.4 (45.3) | 11.3 (52.3) | 14.4 (57.9) | 13.8 (56.8) | 9.8 (49.6) | 4.9 (40.8) | 1.4 (34.5) | −2.2 (28.0) | 4.1 (39.3) |
| Average precipitation mm (inches) | 45 (1.8) | 40 (1.6) | 41 (1.6) | 45 (1.8) | 62 (2.4) | 72 (2.8) | 85 (3.3) | 72 (2.8) | 56 (2.2) | 59 (2.3) | 52 (2.0) | 45 (1.8) | 674 (26.4) |
Source: https://en.climate-data.org/europe/lithuania/siauliai-county/joniskis-12767/

== Gallery ==
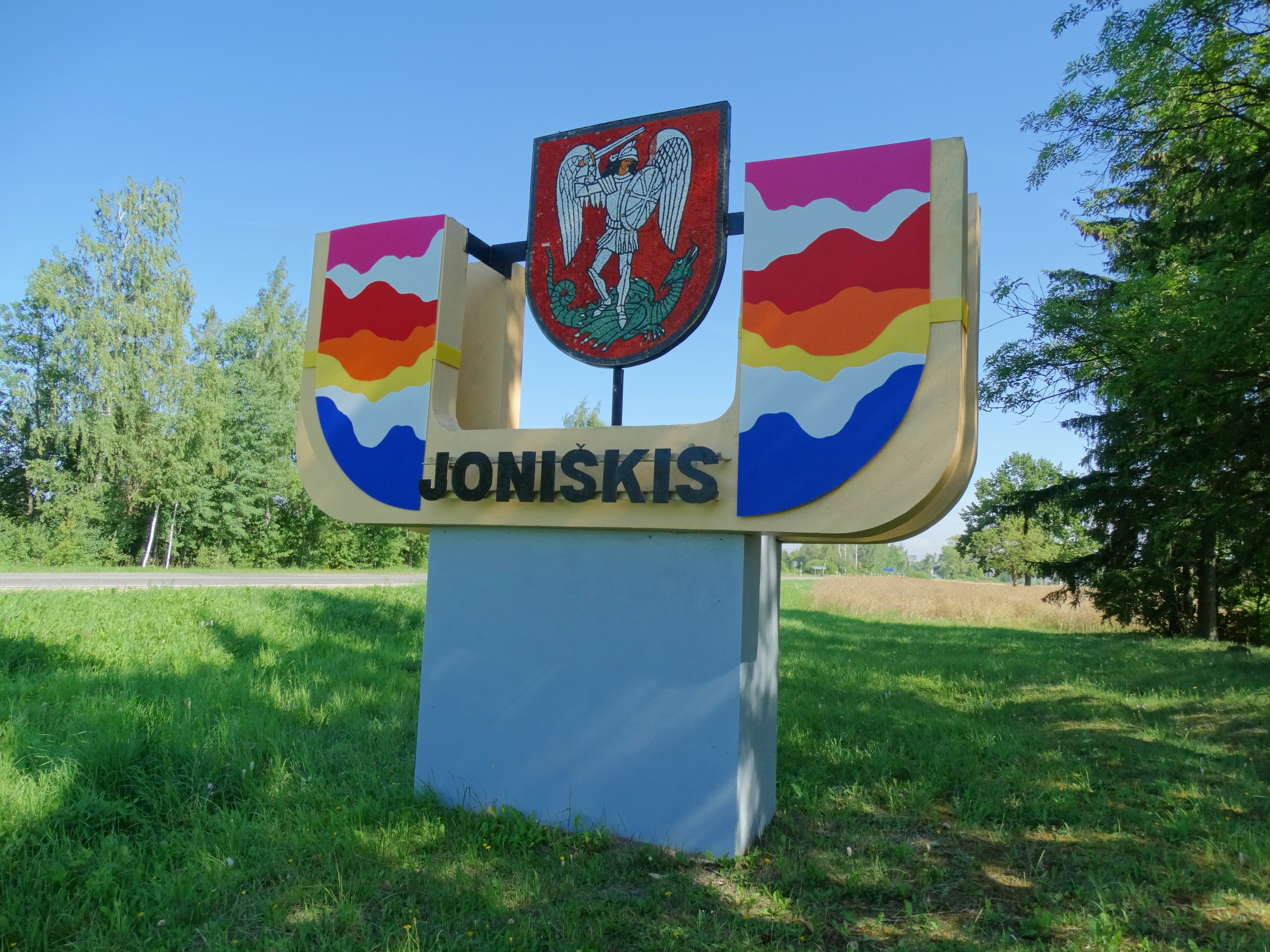
Border mark

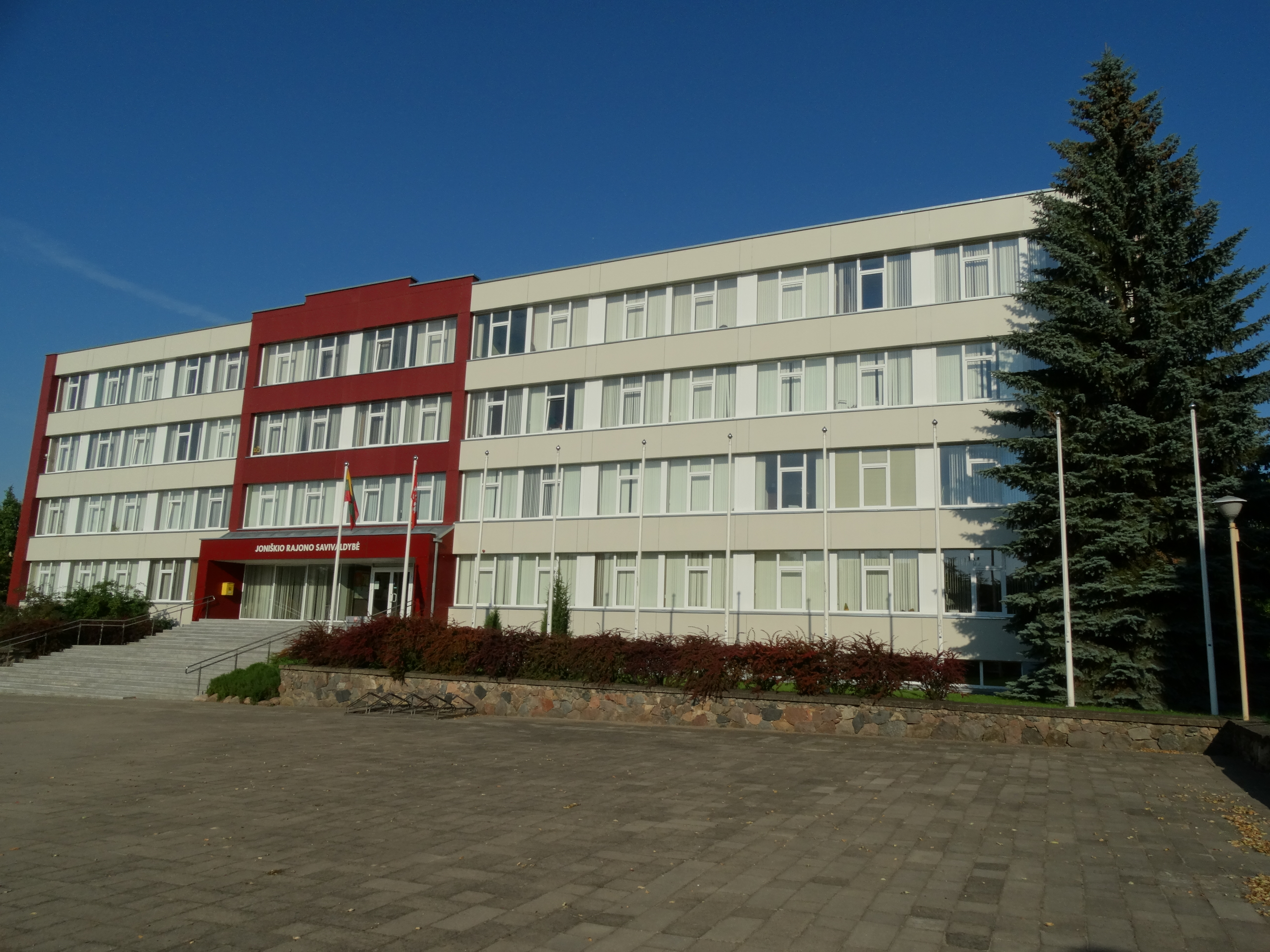
City municipality main building

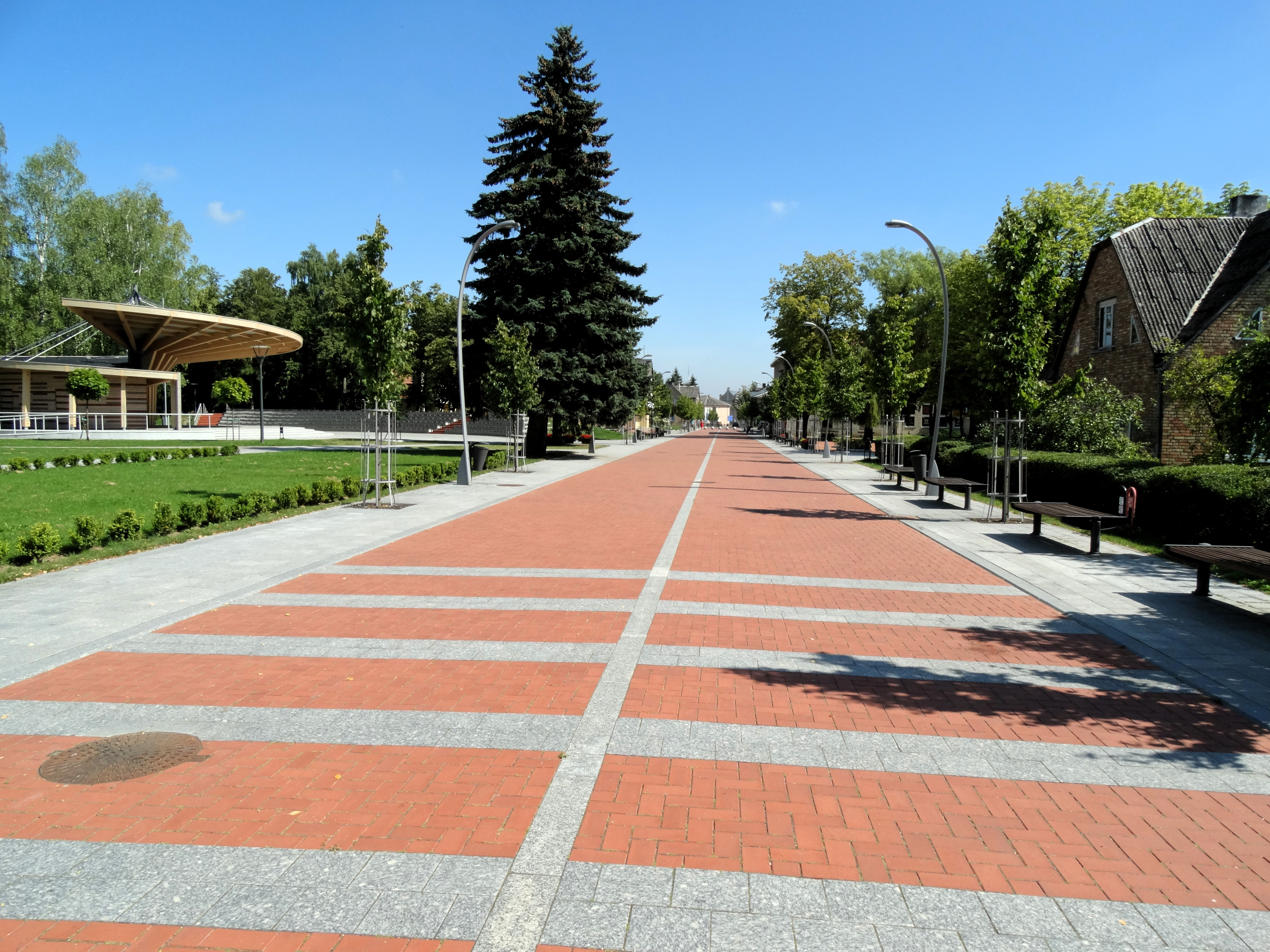
Pedestrian street

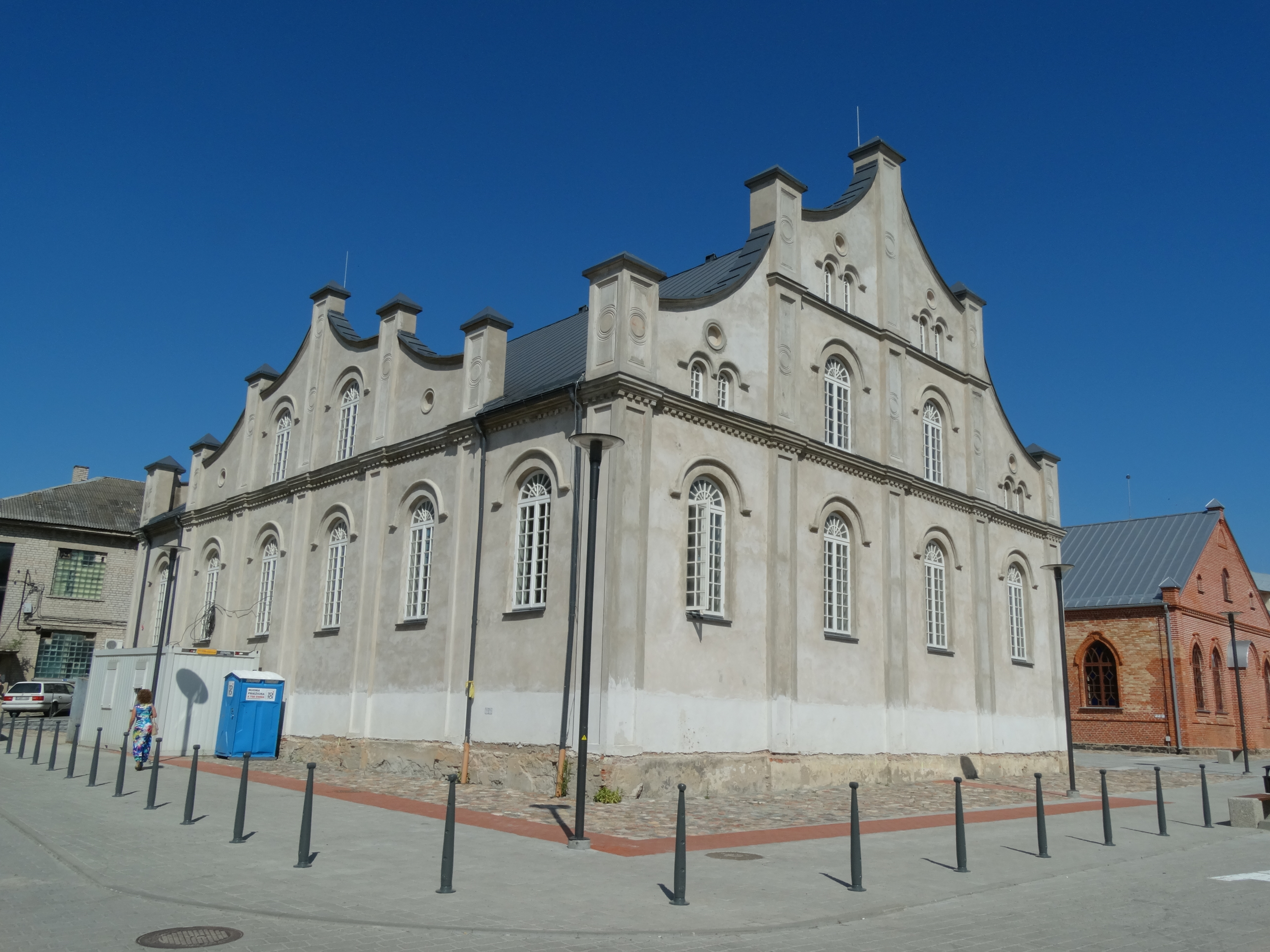
White Synagogue

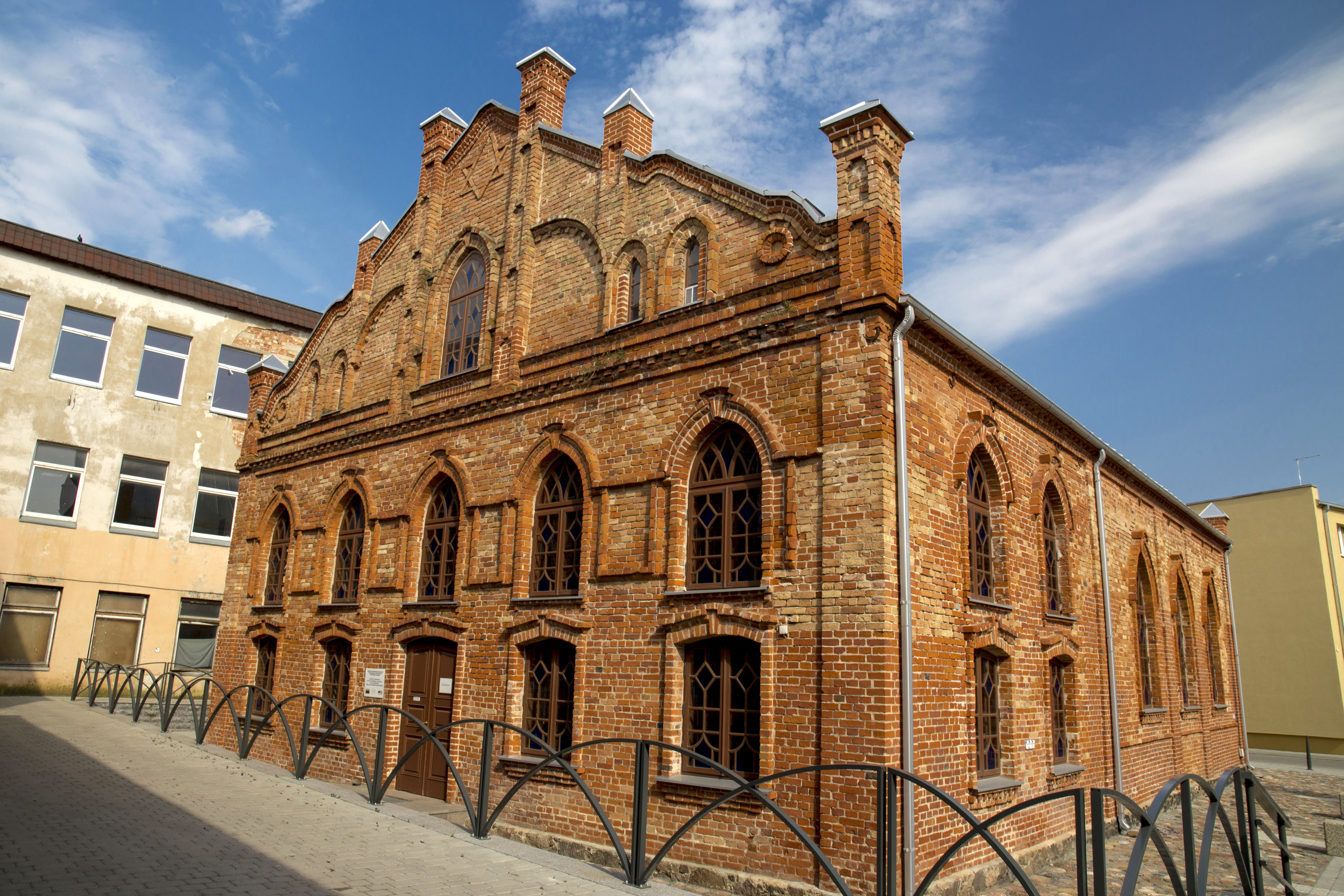
Joniškis Synagogue Complex

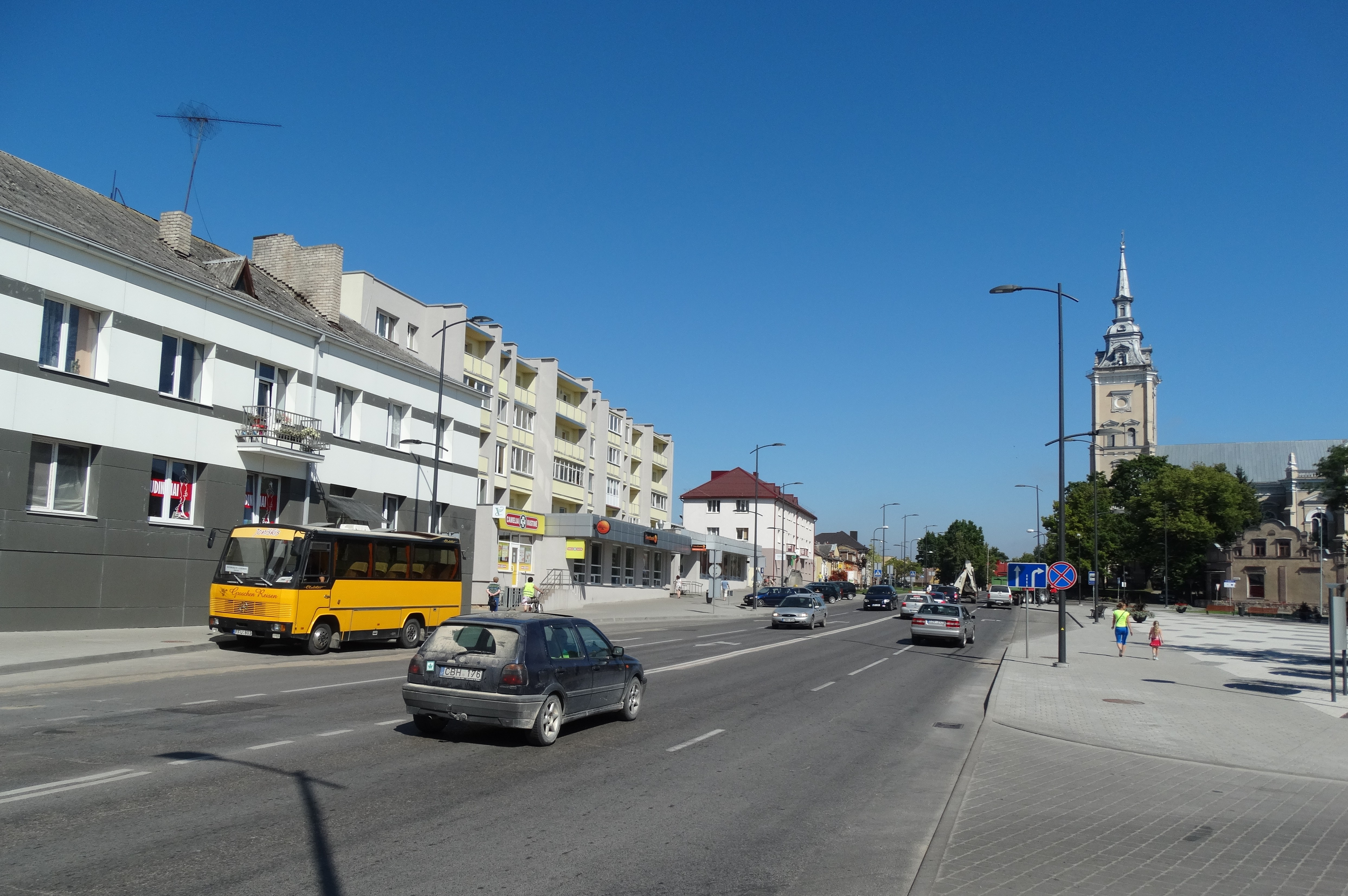
Central street (former market square)

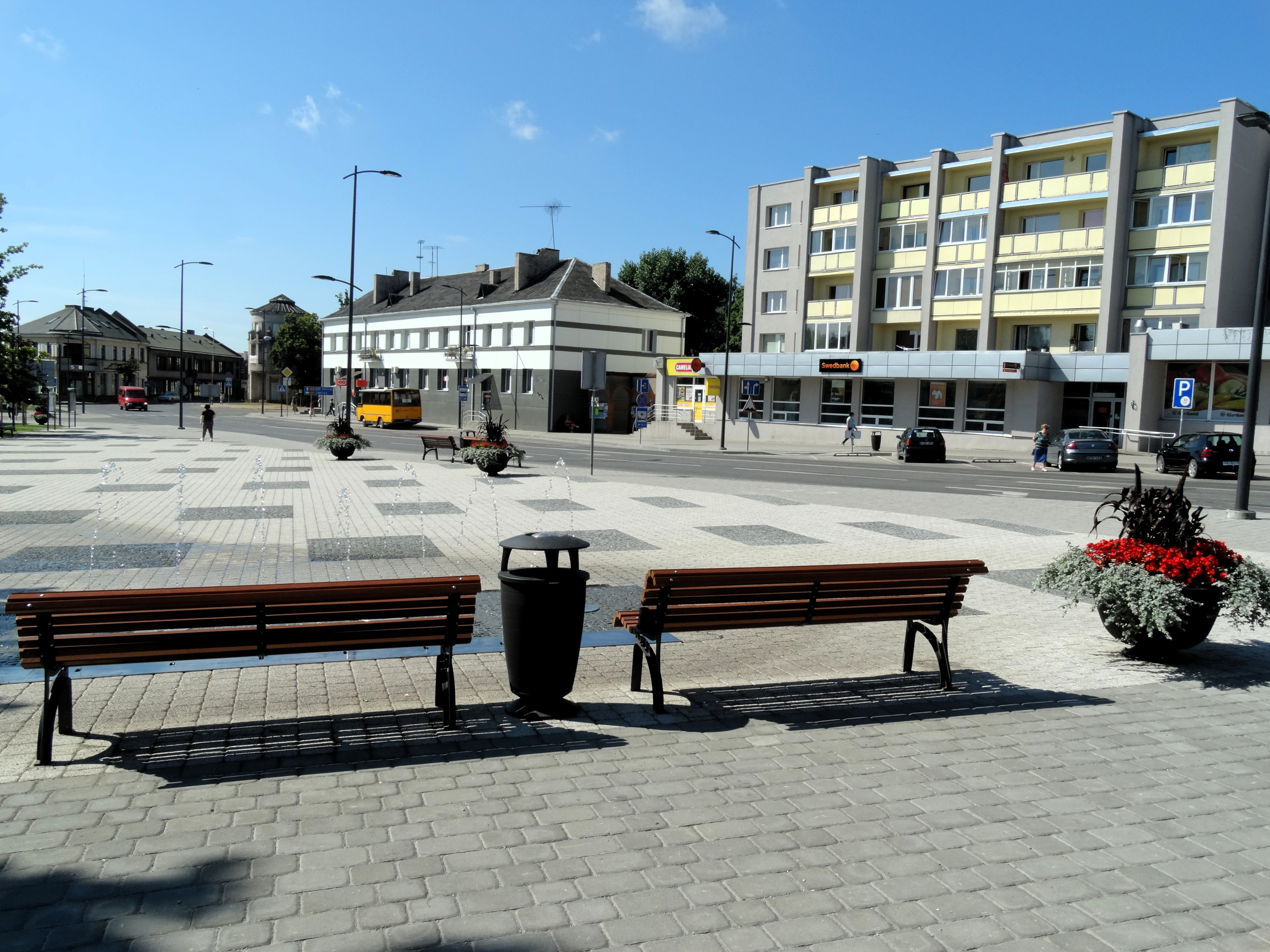
Reconstructed former market square

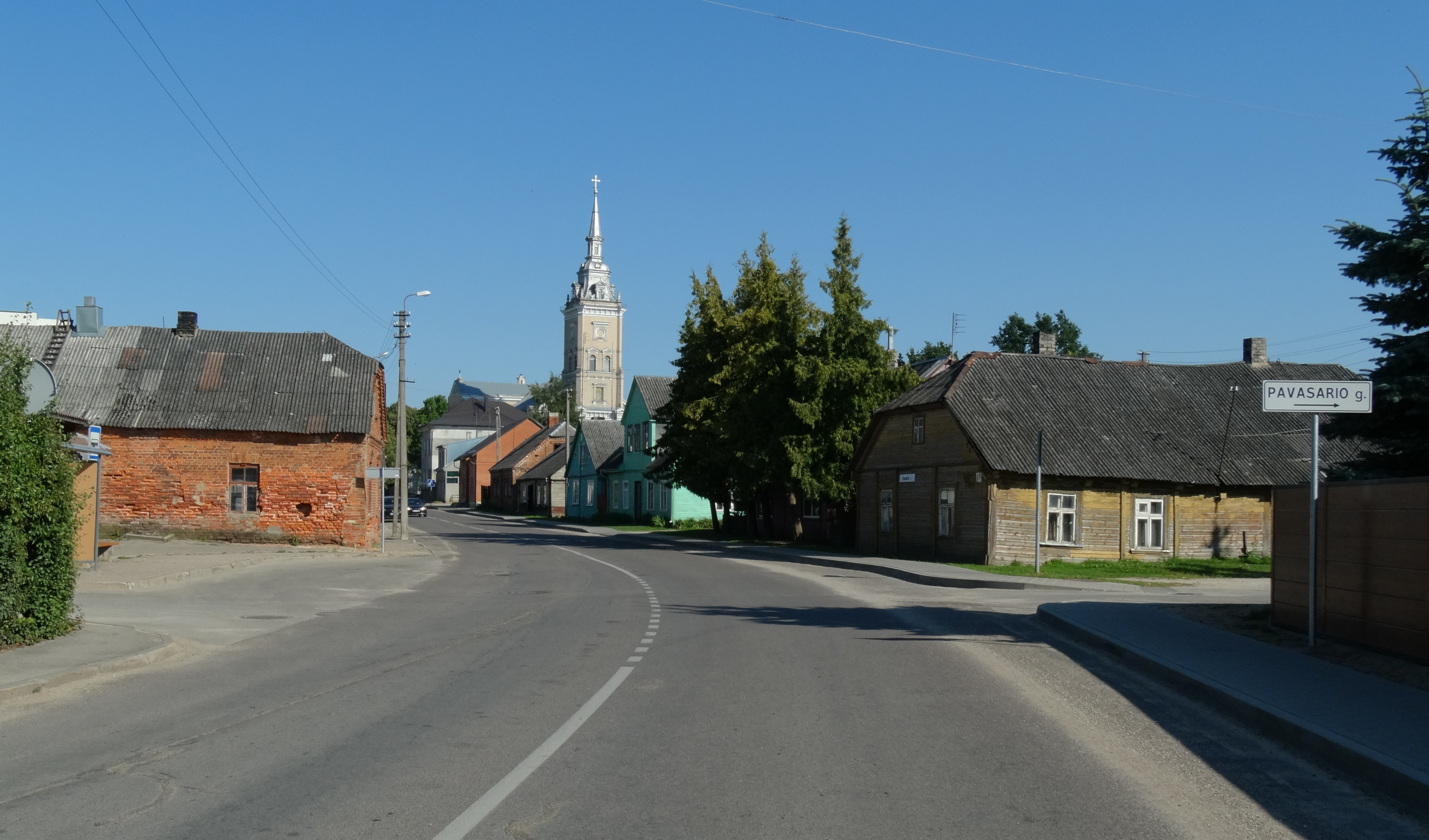
Old town

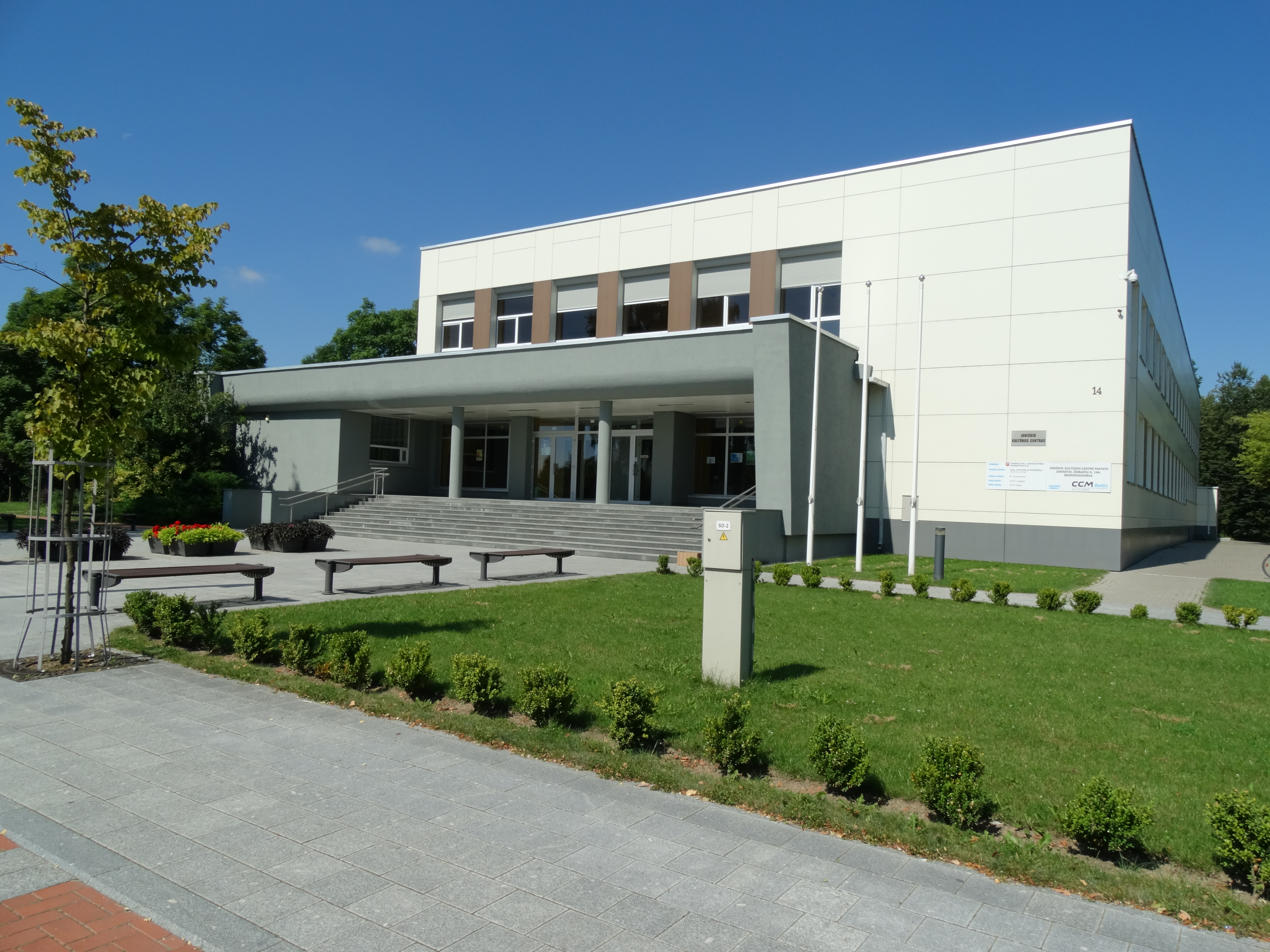
Joniškis Centre of Culture

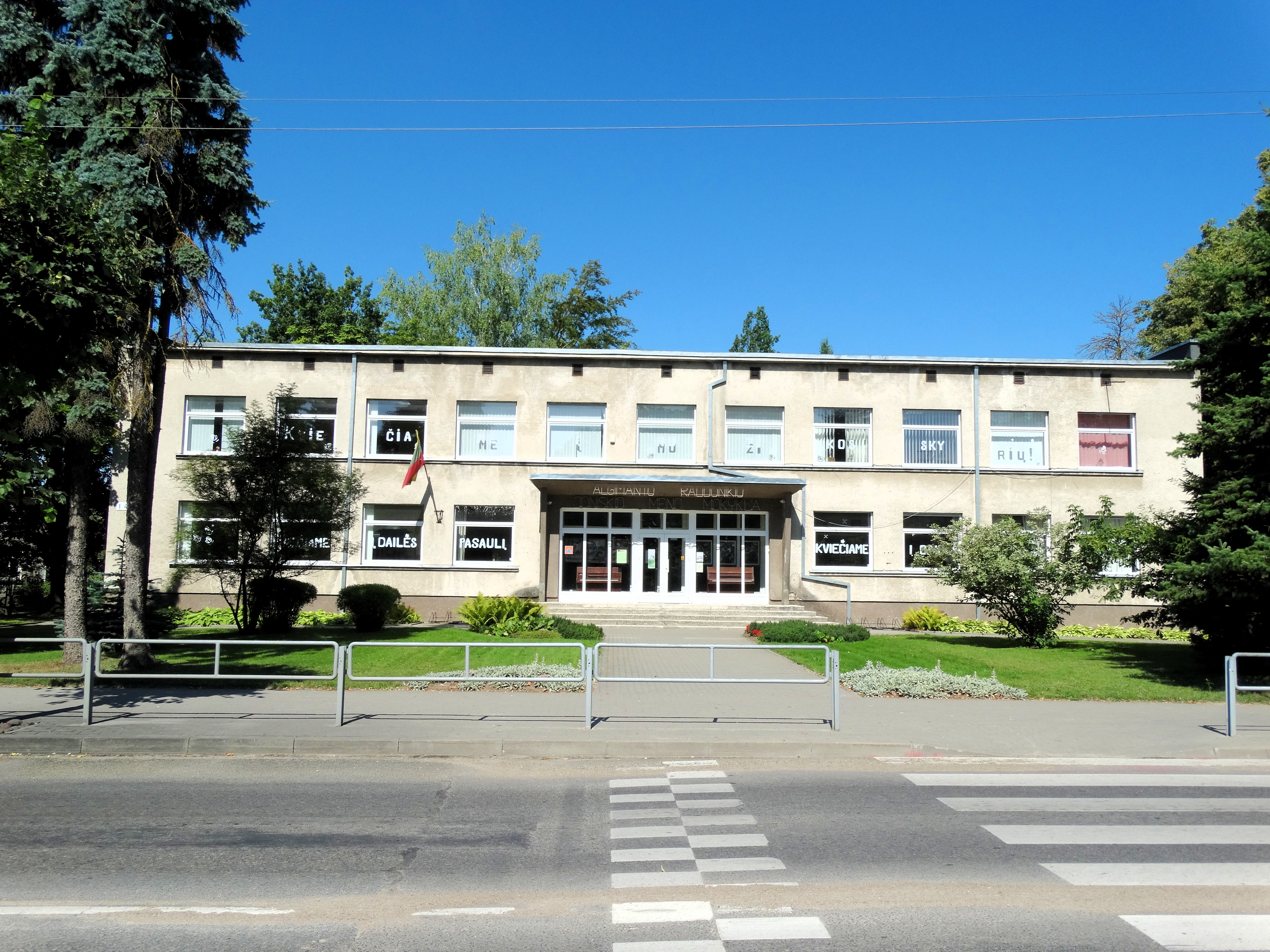
Joniškis School of Arts

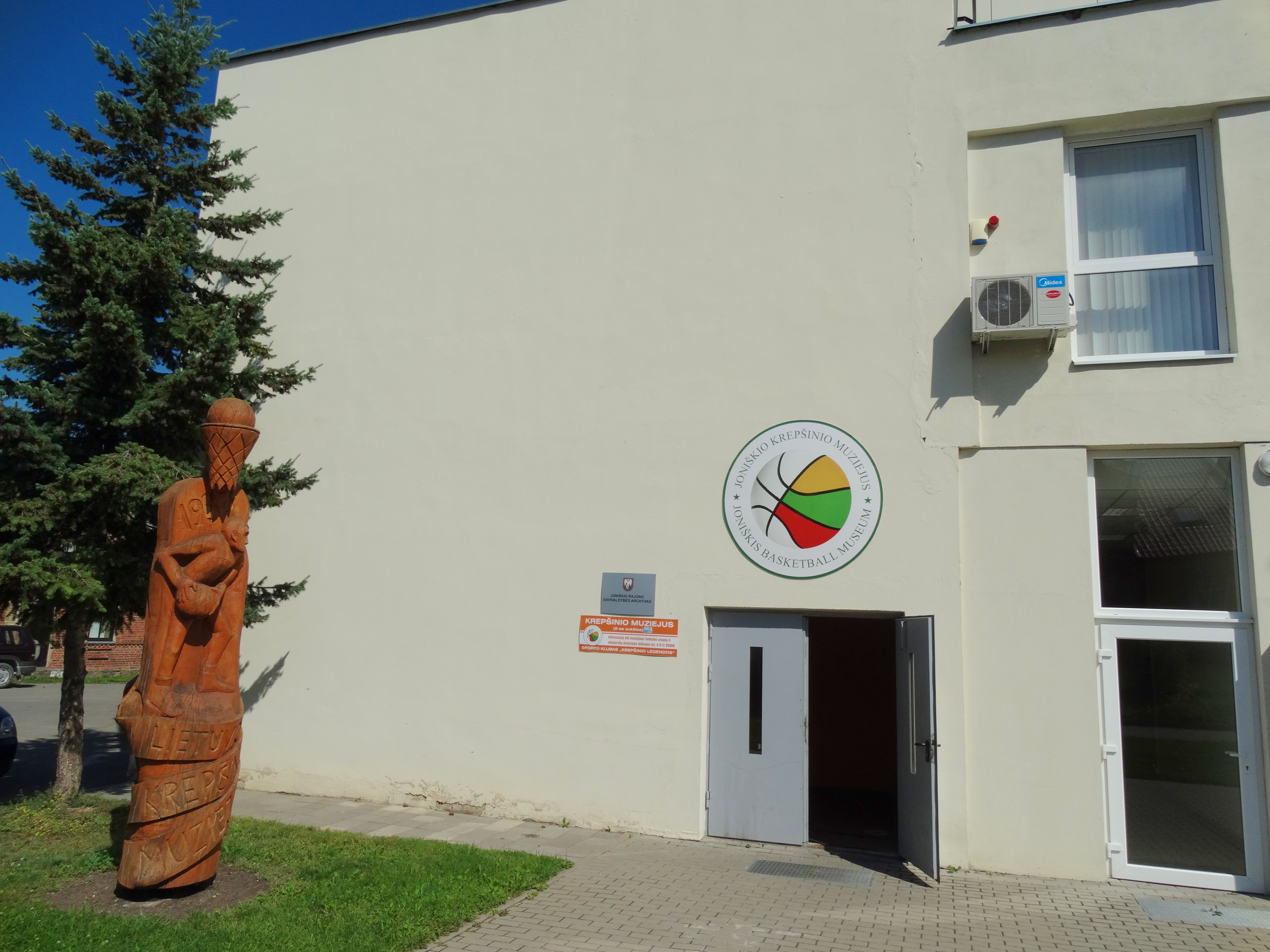
Basketball museum

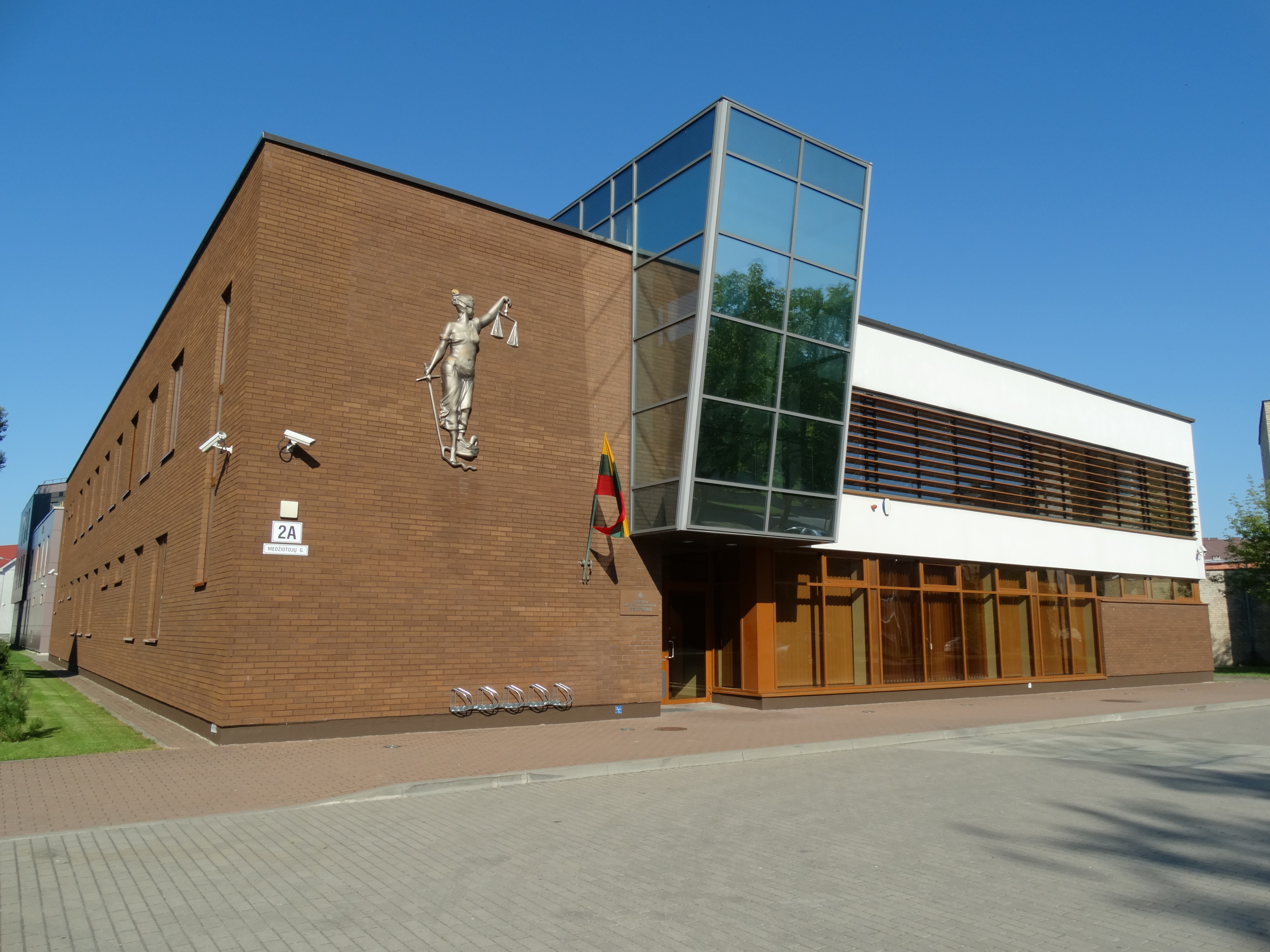
Court

== Notable people ==
- Laurence Harvey
- Maksimas Katche
- Charles Segal
- Andrius Šležas
- Adomas Varnas
- Benas Veikalas

== Twin towns – sister cities ==
Joniškis is twinned with:

- Auce, Latvia
- Dobele, Latvia
- Jelgava Municipality, Latvia
- Konin, Poland
- Novoselitsky District, Russia
- Sulingen, Germany
- Ungheni, Moldova
- Vimmerby, Sweden
- Võru, Estonia
