= Red Synagogue of Joniškis =

Former synagogue in Joniškis, Lithuania

- Lithuanian: Joniškio Raudonoji sinagoga
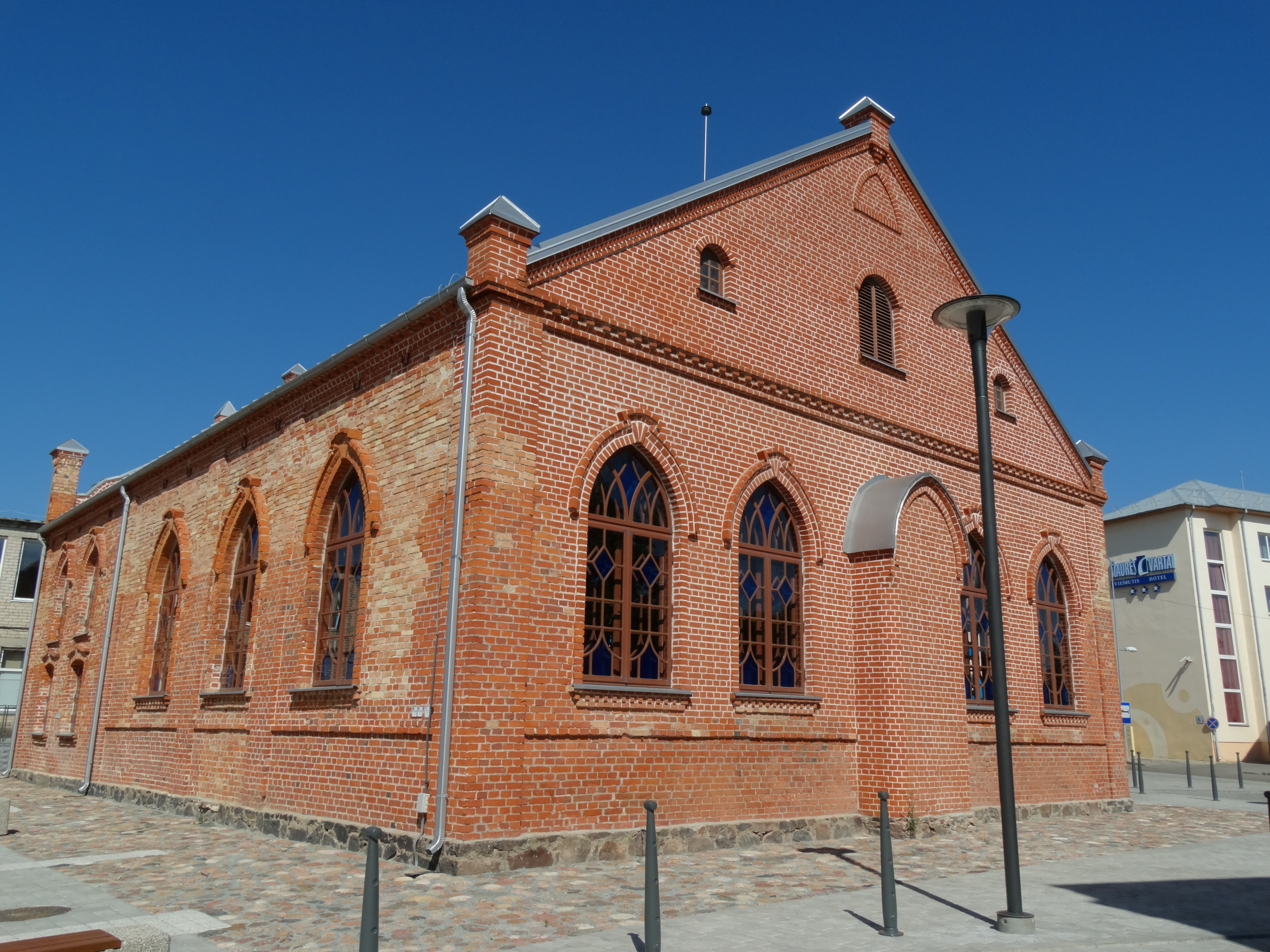
- The former synagogue in 2015

- Location of the former synagogue in Lithuania

Religion
- Affiliation: Judaism
- Rite: Nusach Ashkenaz
- Ecclesiastical or organizational status: Synagogue (1865–1941); Profane use (1941–c. 2000s); Jewish museum (since 2014)
- Status: Abandoned (as a synagogue); Repurposed

Location
- Location: 4a Miesto Square, Joniškis, Šiauliai County
- Country: Lithuania
- Interactive map of Red Synagogue of Joniškis
- Coordinates: 56°14′25″N 23°37′01″E

Architecture
- Type: Synagogue architecture
- Style: Classical Revival; Romanesque Revival
- Established: 1797 (as a congregation)
- Completed: 1865; 1911
- Materials: Brick

The Red Synagogue of Joniškis (Lithuanian: Joniškio Raudonoji sinagoga) is a former Jewish congregation and synagogue, located at 4a Miesto Square, in Joniškis, in the Šiauliai County of Lithuania. Called the Winter or Small synagogue; it was designed in the Classical Revival and Romanesque Revival styles, and completed in 1865 and rebuilt after the 1911 fire. The building operated as a synagogue until it was devastated by Nazis in 1941.

Subsequently used for profane purposes, the building was restored from 2011 and has been repurposed as a Jewish museum since 2014. The former synagogue was located adjacent to the White Synagogue of Joniškis.

== History ==
In 1797 the permit to build a synagogue in Joniškis was granted; and the synagogue completed in 1865. After World War II, the synagogue was converted into warehouse, later on into gym.

In 1997 building listed on the list of Protected Cultural Objects.

The Red Synagogue of Joniškis was renovated and re-opened to the public in 2011.

== See also ==
- History of the Jews in Lithuania
- Lithuanian Jews
