= Martynas Mažvydas National Library of Lithuania =

National library of Lithuania

Coordinates: 54°41′27″N 25°15′49″E

- Lietuvos nacionalinė Martyno Mažvydo biblioteka

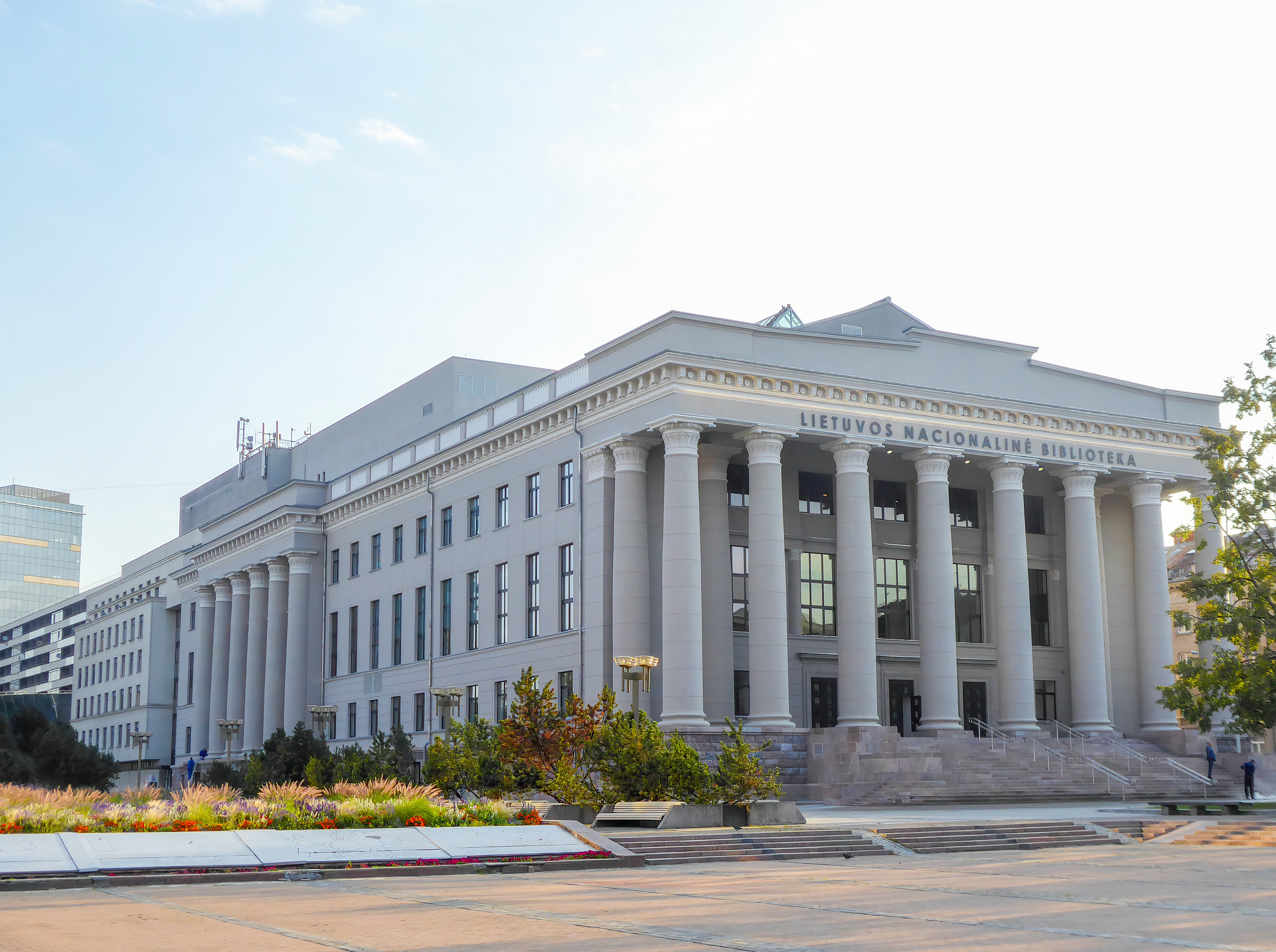
- Martynas Mažvydas National Library of Lithuania building in Gediminas Avenue, Vilnius
- Location: Gedimino ave. 51, Vilnius, Lithuania
- Type: National library
- Established: 1919; 107 years ago

Collection
- Items collected: Books, journals, newspapers, magazines, sound and music recordings, maps, prints, manuscripts, posters etc.
- Size: 6,425,401 items

Access and use
- Circulation: 395,180 (2024)

Other information
- Director: Director General Aušrinė Žilinskienė
- Website: www.lnb.lt

Martynas Mažvydas National Library of Lithuania (Lithuanian: Lietuvos nacionalinė Martyno Mažvydo biblioteka) is a national cultural institution which collects, organizes and preserves Lithuania's written cultural heritage content, develops the collection of Lithuanian and foreign documents relevant to research, educational and cultural needs of Lithuania, and provides library information services to the public.

== Duties ==
Martynas Mažvydas National Library goals are accumulation and preservation of the Lithuanian documentary cultural heritage for the future generations and ensuring its access, active participation in the knowledge society creation process, development of its activities and services using modern information technologies with the purpose to assist the learning and development processes of Lithuanian people, providing methodological support for Lithuanian libraries, carrying out research in library science, bibliography, information science and bibliology, evolving library science theory and practice and strengthening the dynamics of integration into the global library science processes.

Functions and responsibilities

- Accumulation and preservation of Lithuanian publications issued in Lithuania and abroad, carrying out the bibliographical control of documents, development of the National Archival Fund of Published Documents;
- Accumulation and storage of other documents, both printed and in other forms, which are valuable for the national culture;
- Providing services for Lithuanian and foreign citizens, institutions and organizations;
- Compilation and publishing of the national bibliography, the bibliographical indexes, compilation of union catalogues and databases;
- Provision of statistics on documents published in Lithuania and assignment of international standard numbers to them (ISSN, ISBN, ISMN);
- Creation and development of the Lithuanian Integrated Library Information System (LIBIS) and Virtual Electronic Heritage System (VEPS);
- Preservation, restoration of library holdings and valuable collections;
- Research in library science, bibliography and bibliology, organization of scientific conferences, issuance of research and methodological publications and the professional magazine "Tarp knygų" (In the World of Books);
- Organization of exhibitions, literary evenings and other cultural events, promotion of Lithuanian culture and science abroad.

== History ==
The National Library was founded in 1919. It started in Kaunas as the State Central Bookstore and in 1963 it was transferred to Vilnius, the capital of Lithuania. In 1988 the library was named after Martynas Mažvydas, the author of the first Lithuanian book, and on May 30, 1989, it was granted the status of the National Library. Since then, the official name of the library has been the Martynas Mažvydas National Library of Lithuania.

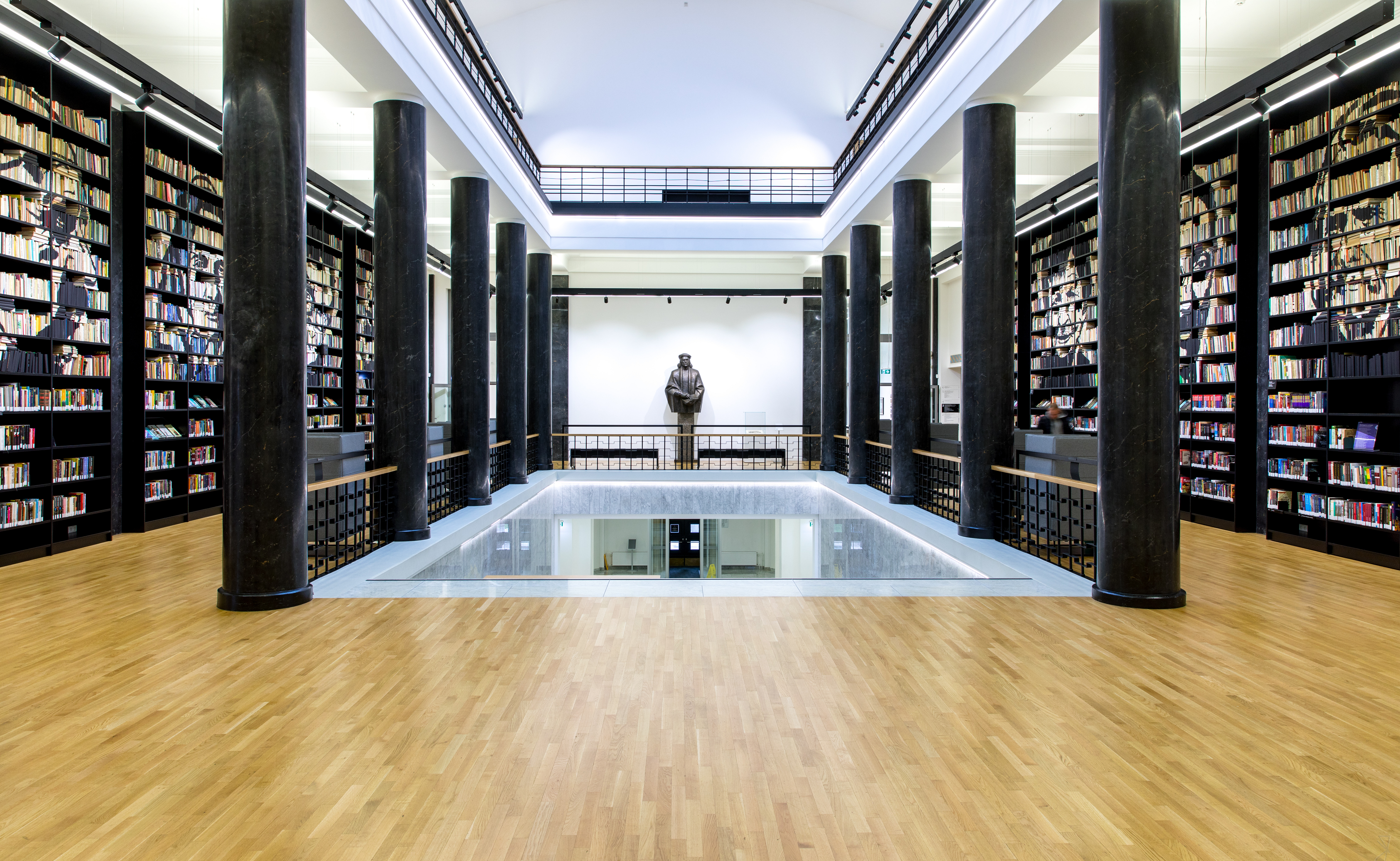
Interior

In 1990 the press of the Lithuanian diaspora began returning to Lithuania. The library received over 1 million prints that came from the US, Germany and France. After the restoration of Lithuania's independence, the development of international cooperation became possible. The National Library became a member of major international library associations and institutions. In 1992 the first cooperation agreement between the national libraries of the Baltic States (Lithuania, Latvia and Estonia) was signed.

On November 20, 1991, by resolution of the Presidium of the Supreme Council of the Republic of Lithuania, the library was entrusted with the function of a parliamentary library in addition to the functions of a national library.

In 1995 the Law on Libraries of the Republic of Lithuania defined the National Library as the main national scientific library for public use.

== Architecture ==
The National Library is a monument to the architecture of socialist realism. The authors of the building's technical design (1952) were the architect Viktor Anikin and the designer Ciprijonas Strimaitis. The library edifice was completed in 1958 and the current library building was officially opened on December 4, 1963. It was the first building in the Baltics designed and built specifically for a library.

In 1992, the construction of the library extension began and lasted for 11 years. In the summer of 2003 the library extension was officially opened. It houses additional reading rooms, document storage and study rooms.

In 1993, the library building was listed in the Registry of Cultural Property

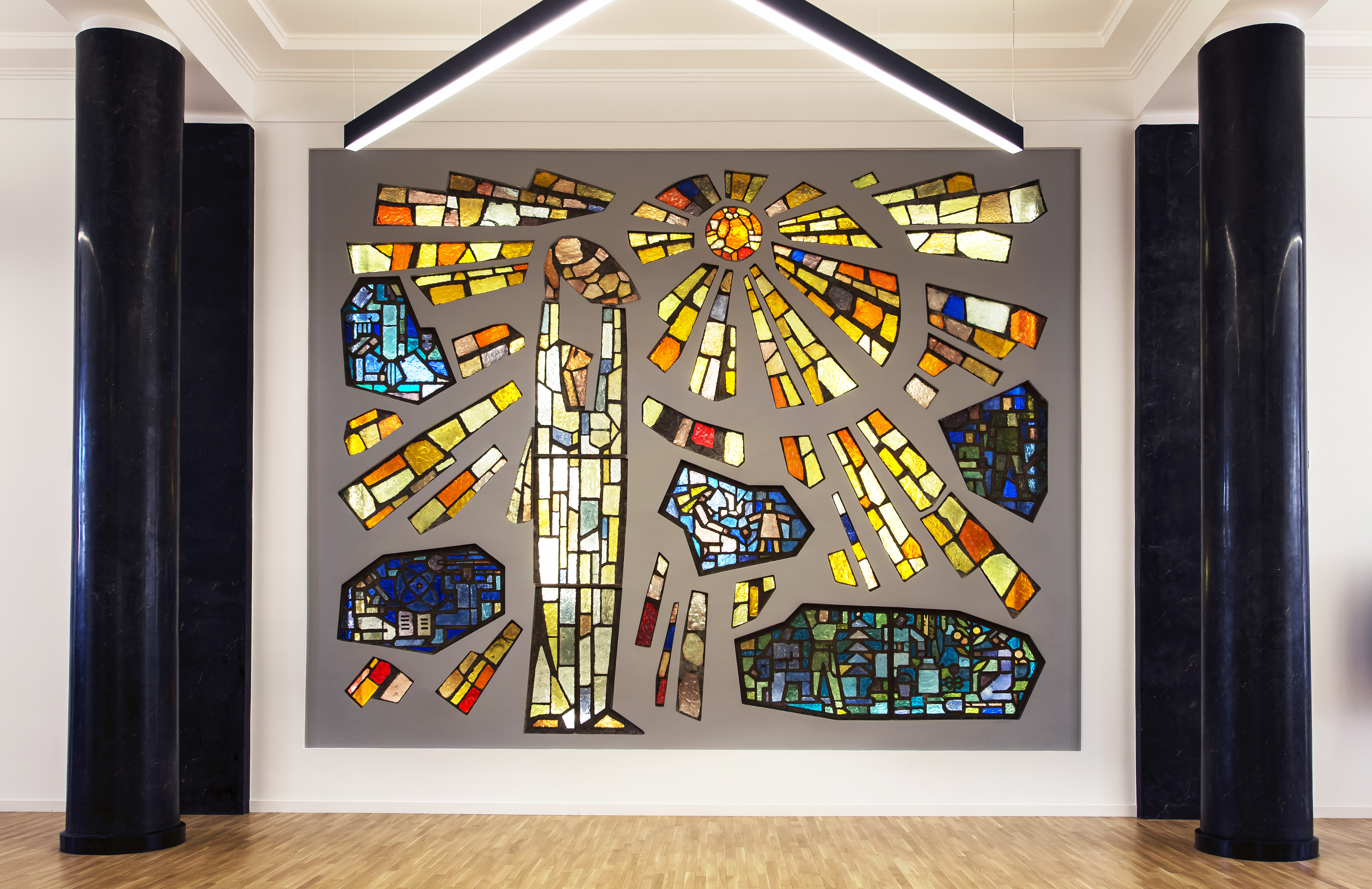
Stained glass "Į šviesią ateitį" (Into the Bright Future). Author: Antanas Garbauskas (1963)

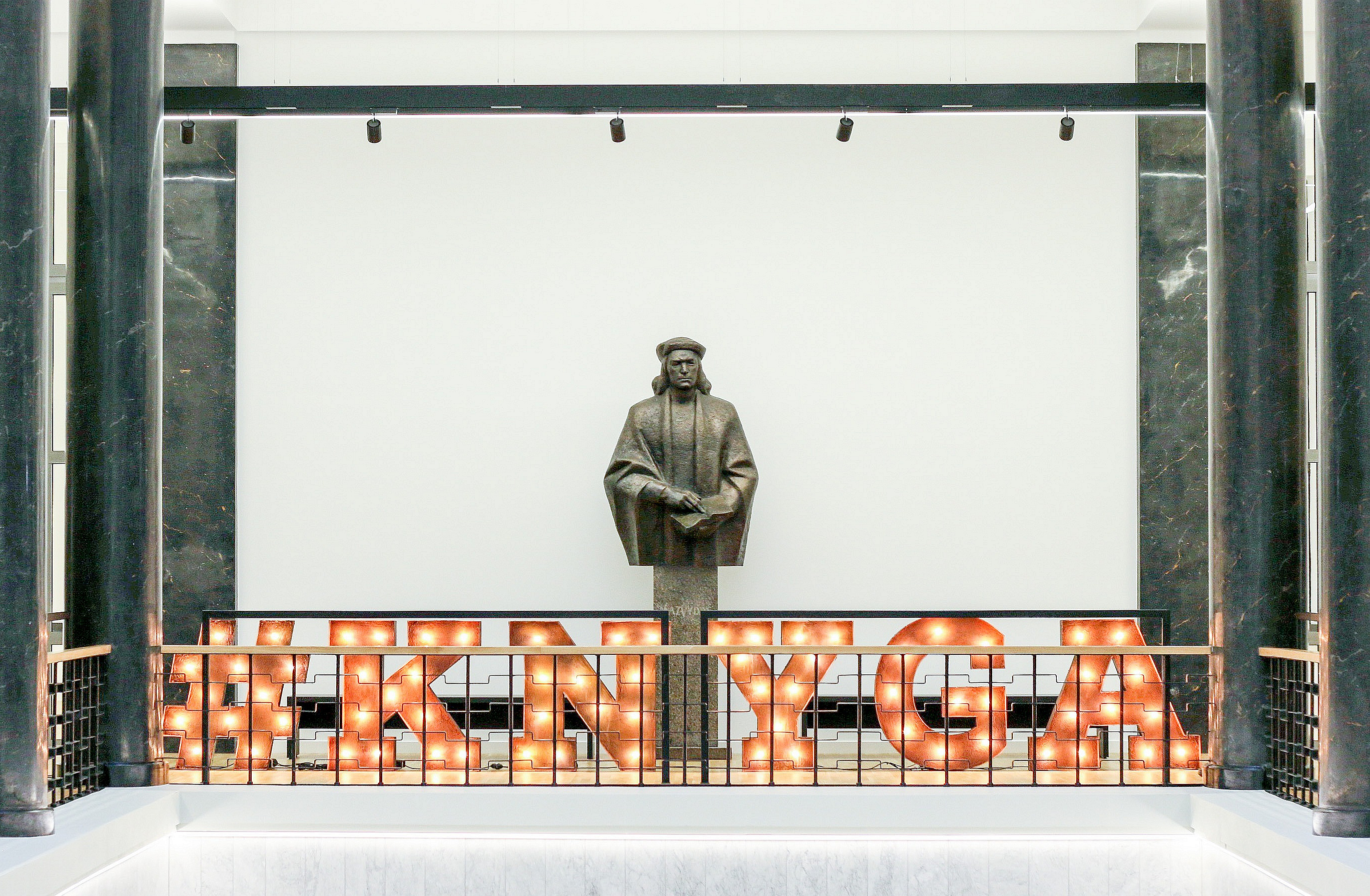
Sculpture "Martynas Mažvydas". Author: Gediminas Jokūbonis (1997)

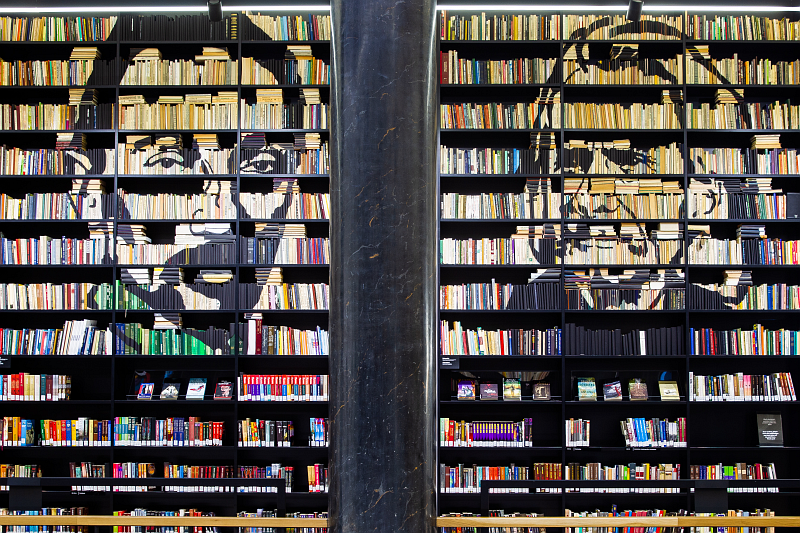
Installation "Pabudę iš knygų" (Awaken from the Books). Author: Jolita Vaitkutė (2018)

In 2008 reconstruction of the main library building began, which lasted until 2016.

== Services ==
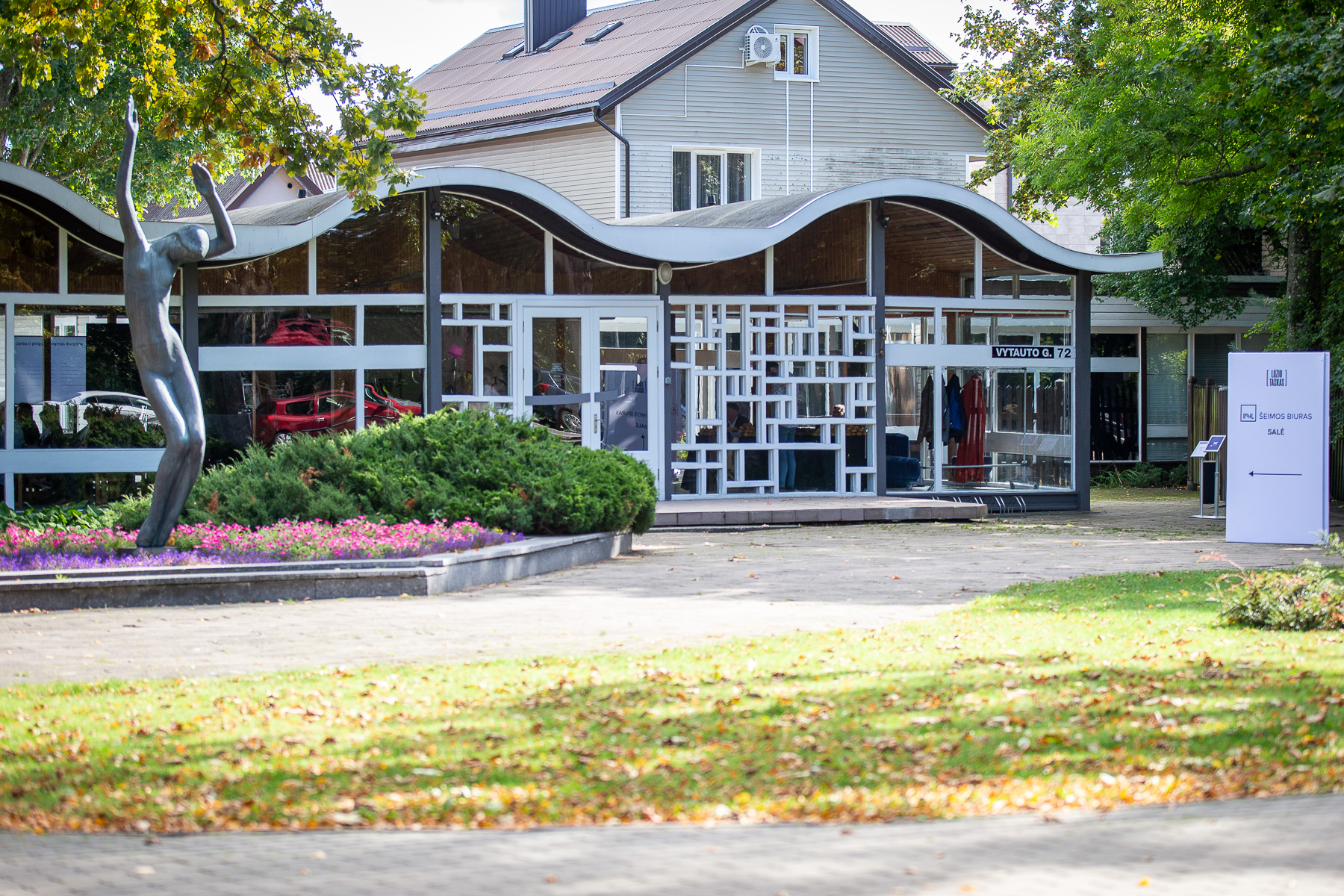
Palanga summer Reading Room

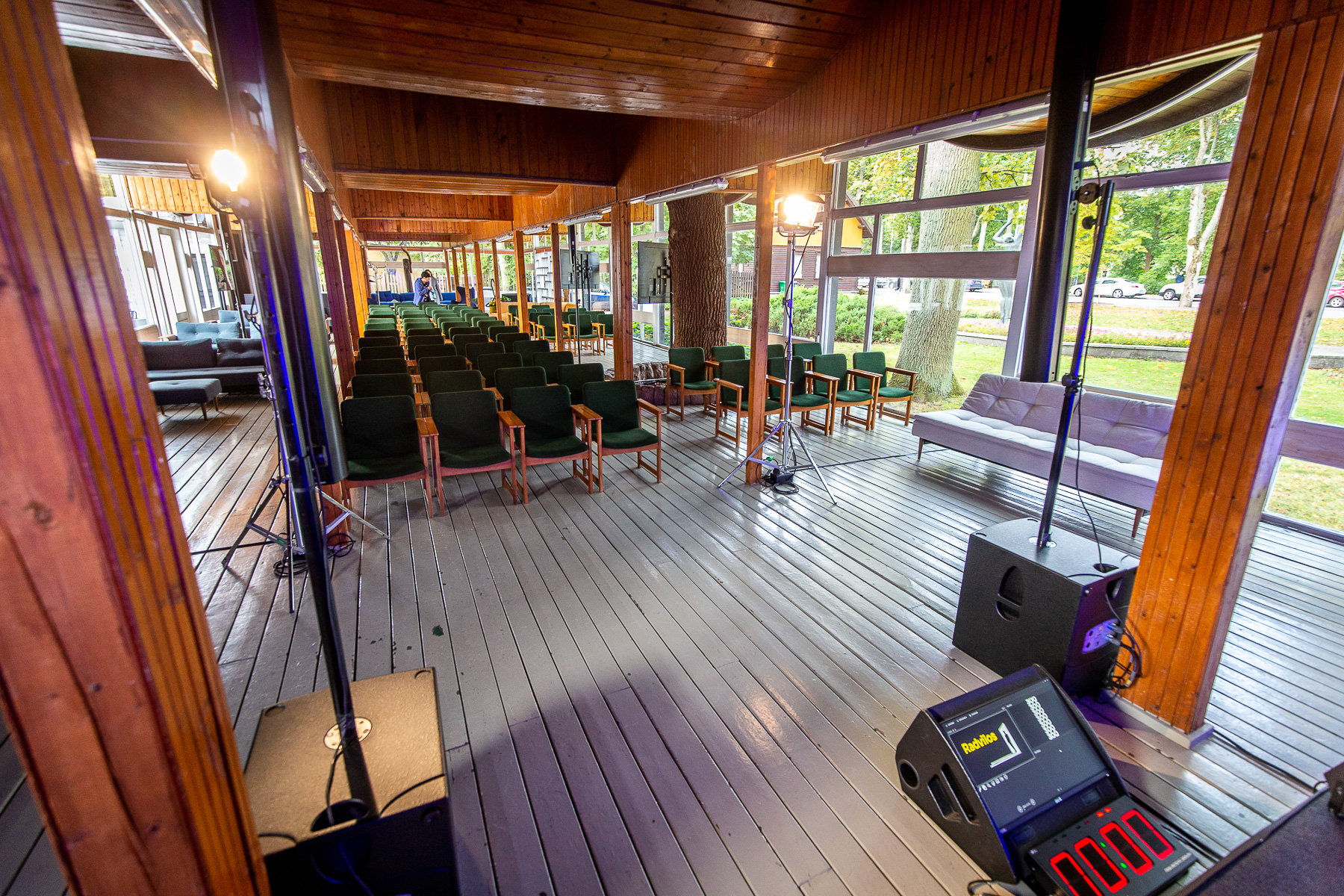
Palanga summer Reading Room

There are nine specialized reading rooms in the National Library: Humanities Reading Room, Lithuanian Studies Reading Room, Social Sciences Reading Room, Music and Visual Arts Reading Room, Rare Books and Manuscripts Reading Room, Media Reading Room, American Space, Children and Youth Literature Reading Room and during the summer in Palanga – Palanga summer Reading Room.

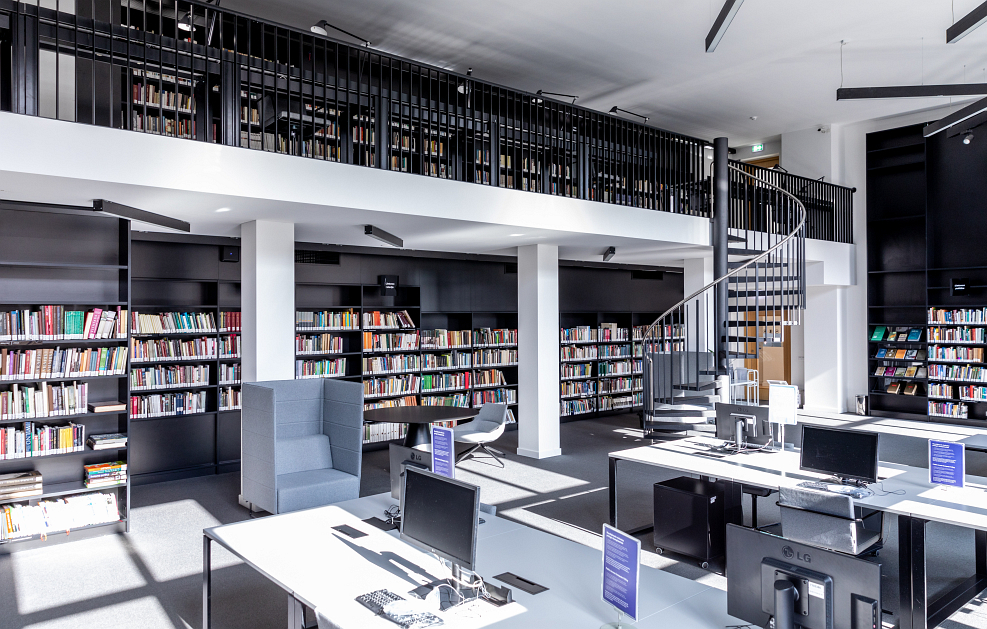
Lithuanian Studies Reading Room

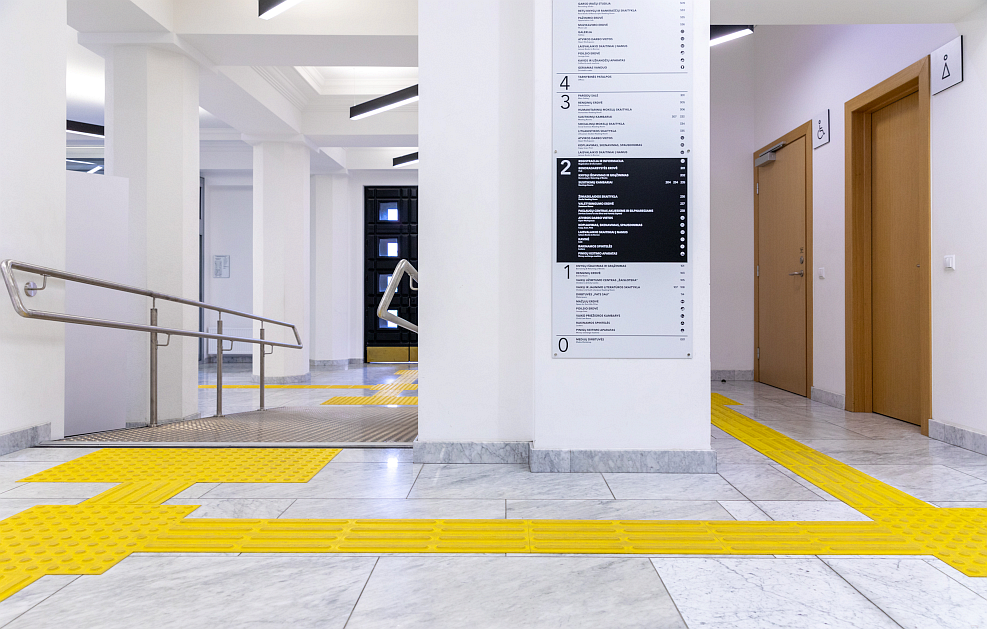
The library is equipped with tactile paths and stairway marking for the visually impaired

The library has three research centres: Judaica Research Centre, Adolfas Damušis Centre for Democratic Studies and Statehood Centre. The activities of the Statehood Centre are carried out in the Statehood space. Its open collection contains the personal library of Prof. Vytautas Landsbergis, the Chairman of the Supreme Council and Reconstituent Seimas of Lithuania.

The library has a cinema room, a music room, a sound recording studio, a TV studio, an educational room, several meeting rooms, a co-working space, a media makerspace, a children's activity centre named Žaisloteka (Toytheque) and a makerspace PATS SAU.

Exhibitions that change every few months are displayed in the Exhibition Hall and other spaces of the National Library. The library hosts various national and international cultural, social, educational, scientific and political events, meetings and conferences as well as book presentations and movie screenings. The library offers a variety of educational activities and training courses for adults, children and youth.

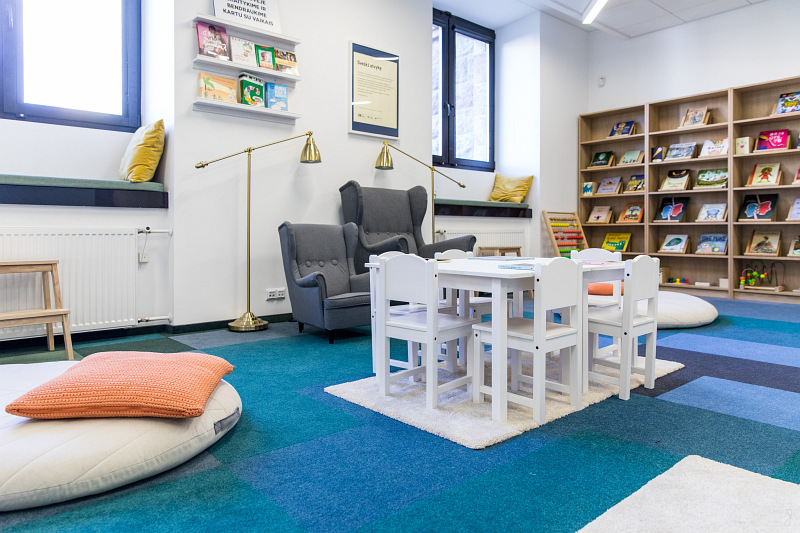
Children's and Youth Literature Reading Room

As part of the project "Promotion of Smart Use of the Web Through the Upgraded Facilities of Public Internet Access" the library has set up a workplace for visually impaired visitors.

== Document Collection ==
The National Library is in charge of collecting and safekeeping the nation's written cultural heritage and making it available to the public. The National Library's document collection contains almost 7 million items (1.8 million titles) of printed and other documents. The library has the following main collections: National Archive Collection of Published Documents, the main collection and specialised as well as personal collections.

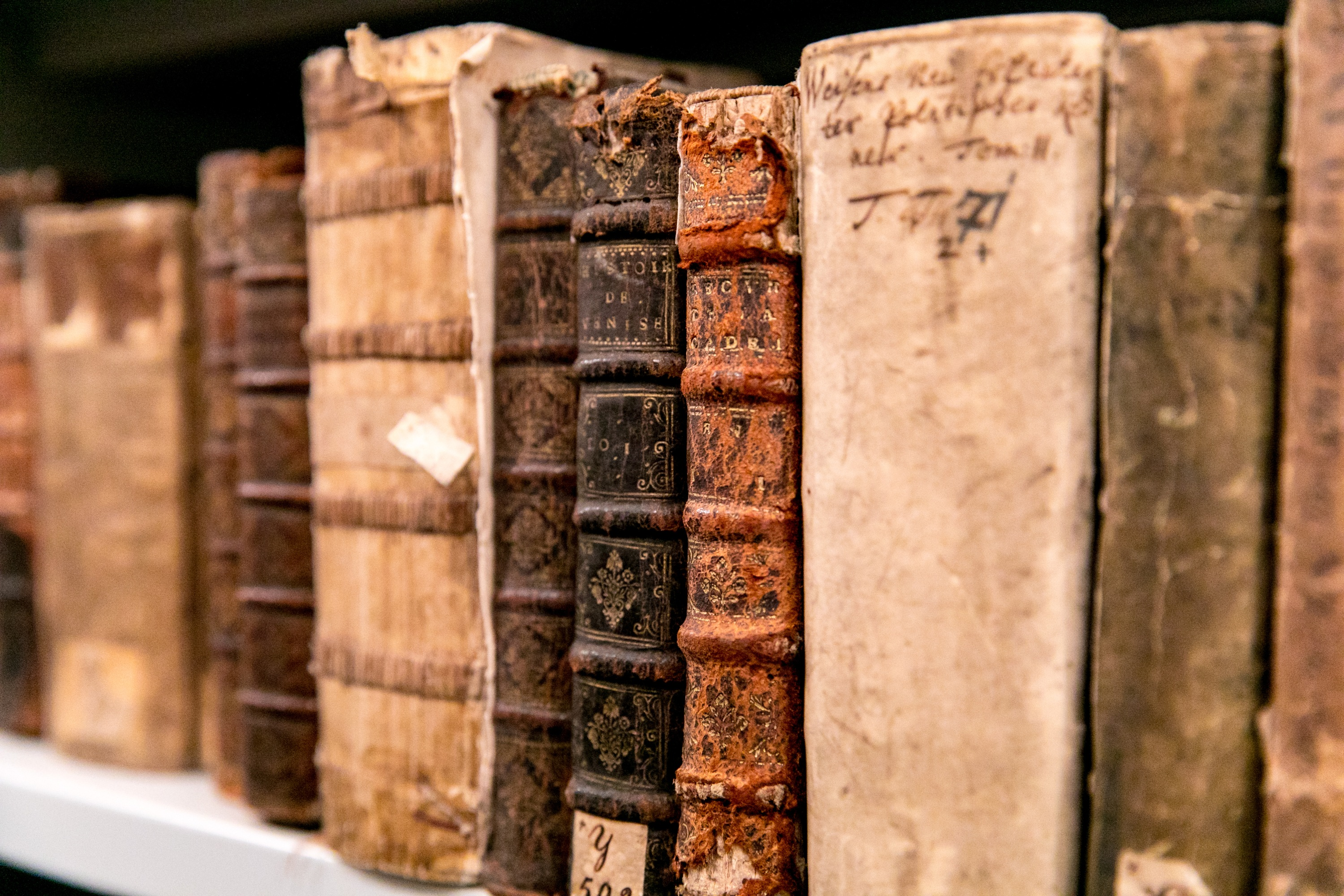
Prints dating back to the 17th century are stored in the collection of rare books and manuscripts

Lithuanian National Archive Collection of Published Documents. It contains all types of documents in Lithuanian and foreign languages published in Lithuania and various documents related to Lithuania published abroad since the 16th century: from the first printed books in the Lithuanian language to electronic documents of today. Currently, the archive stores over 2.5 million physical items. The Archive Collection also includes the audiovisual archive with over 14,000 documents such as audio and video CDs, audio and video cassettes, vinyl and shellac records, and piano rolls. In 2018, after the transfer of Braille publications and documents adapted to the needs of people with reading disabilities as well as standards and other normative documents to the archives, the National Library became the main custodian of the National Archives of Published Documents in Lithuania.

Rare Books and Manuscripts Collection. It stores approximately 70,000 of the 15th–21st century prints, over 70,000 manuscripts and archival documents of the 15th–21st centuries, and dissertations defended in Lithuania since 1994. Particularly valuable collections are the parchment collection (151 parchments), a collection of incunables (90 items) and a collection of documents from late 14th to first half of the 20th century written in the Old Church Slavonic language. The largest part of the manuscripts collection consists of the archives of private persons (Lithuanian writers, scientists, artists, cultural activists who lived in Lithuania and abroad) from the 19th and 20th centuries. It also stores the memorial collections entrusted to the library by various prominent figures of the Lithuanian history: the Lozoraitis family of diplomats, the philosopher Antanas Maceina, the poet Tomas Venclova and others.

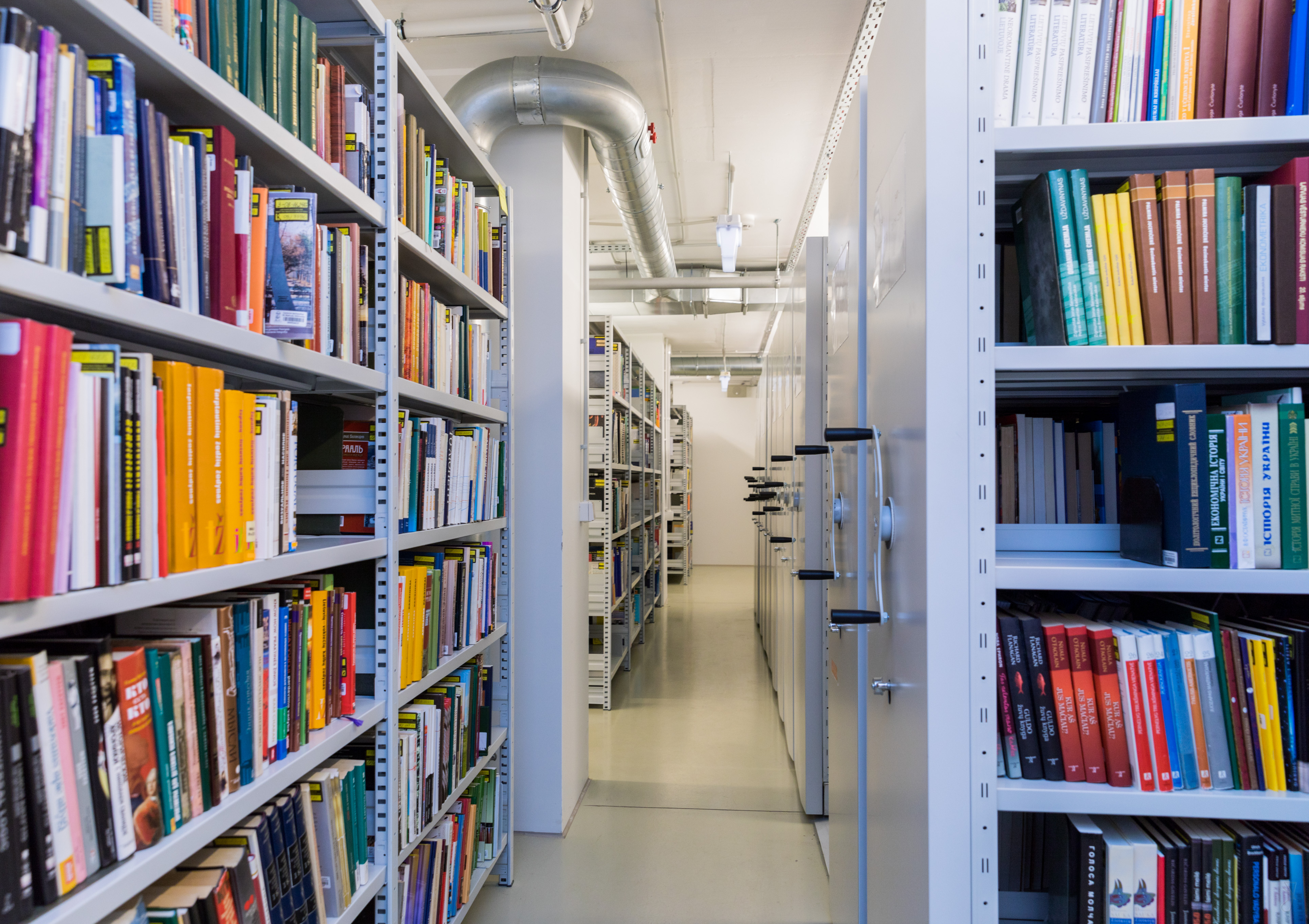
General collections

Judaica Collection. It contains publications of culturology, religion, theology, global and Lithuanian Jewish history in Yiddish and Hebrew as well as classical and contemporary Jewish literature (in various languages). Biographies of prominent Lithuanian Jews, Jewish cookbooks, reference books, encyclopaedias, dictionaries, and bibliographic publications are also stored here.

Music and Visual Arts Collection. It contains audio and video documents, sheet music and small prints of music and visual arts (posters, placards, postcards, ex-libris). The collection has a total of over 300,000 documents. Exceptionally valuable is the collection of Lithuanian shellac records (2,566 titles) dating back to early 20th century.

Children and Youth Literature Collection. It stores fiction books for children and youth of Lithuanian and foreign authors translated into Lithuanian as well as publications related to children and youth literature: encyclopaedias, dictionaries, reference books, textbooks, exercise books, information publications and other types of literature, periodicals for children and adolescents (about 132,000 physical items).

General Collection. It stores about 60 percent of documents accumulated in the library: Lithuanian and foreign books, serial publications and periodicals, cartography documents published since 1826 to date in a variety of themes and genres in more than 90 languages.

== Cooperation ==
The National Library cooperates with various national and international library institutions and organizations. Since 1992 the library has been a member of the International Federation of Library Associations and Institutions (IFLA) and it participates in the activities of the Conference of European National Librarians (CENL), the Conference of Directors of National Libraries (CDNL), the Association of European Research Libraries (LIBER), Bibliotheca Baltica, International Board on Books for Young People (IBBY), International Association of Music Libraries, Archives and Documentation Centres (IAML), International organization Electronic Information for Libraries (EIFL), Lithuanian Association of Research Libraries and other organizations. The library is actively involved in international projects carried out by these institutions. Since 2007 the National Library has been involved in the development of the Europeana digital library, and since 2018 it has been the national aggregator of this program.

== Projects ==
The National Library's involvement in national and international networks provides for the realization of significant projects which determine positive changes in Lithuanian libraries.

- In 2008–2012 the National Library together with the Ministry of Culture of the Republic of Lithuania and Bill & Melinda Gates Foundation implemented the project "Libraries for Innovation", which enhanced the availability to patrons of information technologies for access to information resources and communication, especially focusing on people in remote parts of the country, as well as those in social risk categories.
- While implementing the Strategy on Digitization of the Lithuanian Cultural Heritage, Digital Content Preservation and Access, the National Library continues the creation of digital cultural heritage content and establishment of electronic services. 2010–2012 is the period of the realization of the project "Development of the Virtual Electronic Heritage System". The website of the project: epaveldas.lt.
- The National Library is carrying out a programme for creating the Lithuanian Integrated Library Information System (LIBIS), and in 2009–2012 it initiated the investment project "Development of Interactive Electronic Services for Ordering and Receiving Publications at Public Libraries". The major goal of the project is a development of electronic services in Lithuanian public libraries. The website of the project: ibiblioteka.lt
- The Children's Literature Centre of the National Library is further implementing the Reading Promotion Programme adopted by the Government of the Republic of Lithuania with the purpose to encourage reading among people from diverse age and social groups, advance their reading skills, and also raise the prestige of reading. The website of the programme: www.skaitymometai.lt.

== See also ==
- List of libraries in Lithuania
