= White Synagogue of Joniškis =

Former synagogue in Joniškis, Lithuania

- Lithuanian: Joniškio Baltoji sinagoga
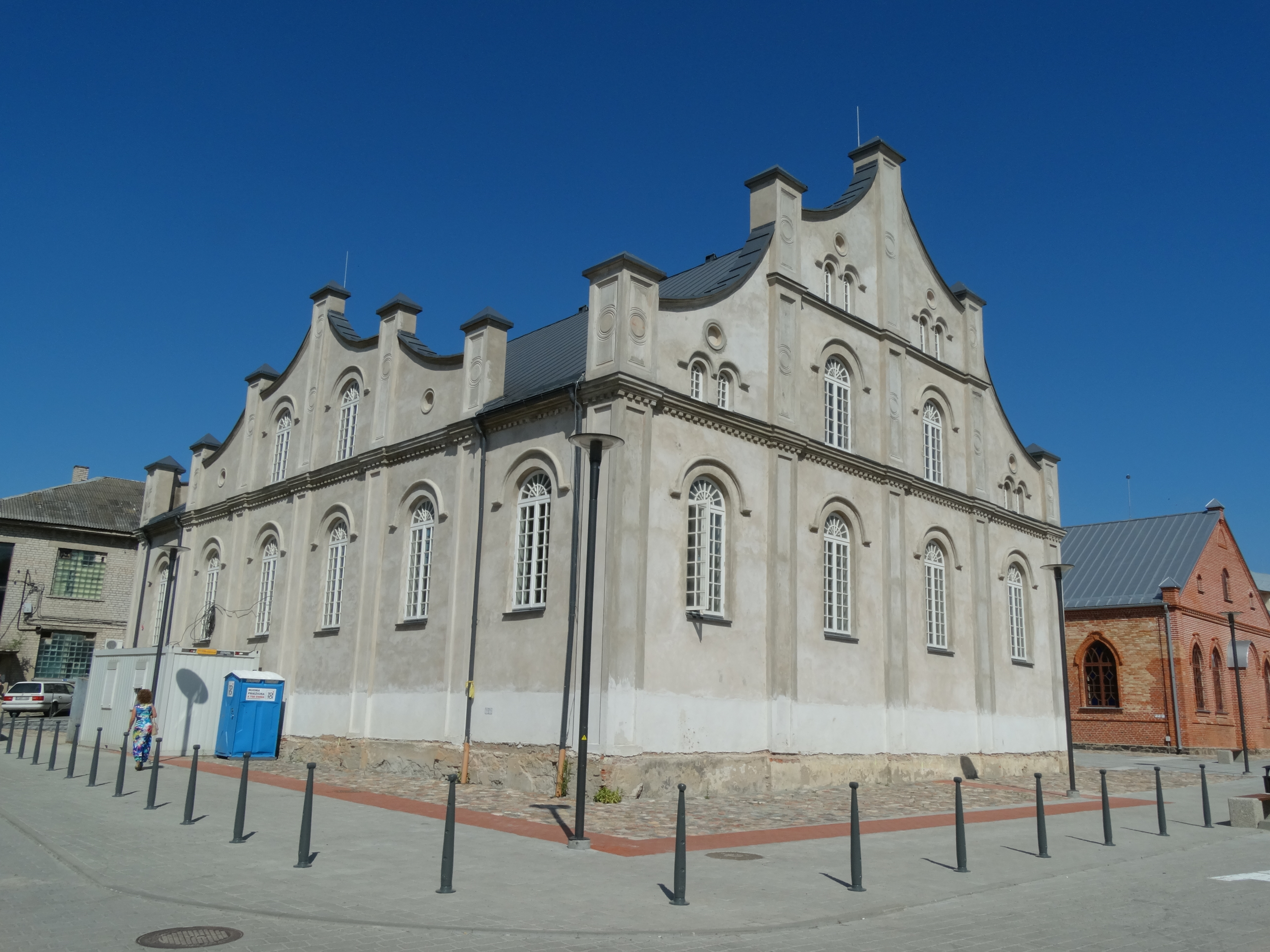
- The former synagogue in 2015

- Location of the former synagogue in Lithuania

Religion
- Affiliation: Judaism (former)
- Rite: Nusach Ashkenaz
- Ecclesiastical or organisational status: Synagogue (1865–1941); Profane use (1941–c. 2000s); Cultural center (since 2014)
- Status: Abandoned (as a synagogue); Repurposed

Location
- Location: 4b Miesto Square, Joniškis, Šiauliai County
- Country: Lithuania
- Coordinates: 56°14′24″N 23°37′00″E

Architecture
- Architect: Saulutė Domanskienė
- Type: Synagogue architecture
- Style: Classical Revival; Romanesque Revival
- Established: 1797 (as a congregation)
- Completed: 1823
- Materials: Brick

The White Synagogue of Joniškis (Lithuanian: Joniškio Baltoji sinagoga) is a former Jewish congregation and synagogue, located at 4a Miesto Square, in Joniškis, in the Šiauliai County of Lithuania.

Completed in 1823, the building, also known as the "Summer" synagogue, was designed by Saulutė Domanskienė in the Classical Revival and Romanesque Revival styles. It stands adjacent to the town’s Red Synagogue and served as a center of Jewish religious life until 1941, when it was severely damaged during the Nazi occupation.

Subsequently used for profane purposes, the building was restored in 2011 and, since 2014, has been repurposed as a cultural center. The former synagogue was located adjacent to the Red Synagogue of Joniškis.

== History ==
In 1797, the permit to build a synagogue in Joniškis was granted; and the synagogue was completed in 1823. After the Second World War, the synagogue was converted into warehouse and then, later on, into gym.

== See also ==
- History of the Jews in Lithuania
- Lithuanian Jews
