= Plungė District Municipal Public Library =

Public library in Lithuania

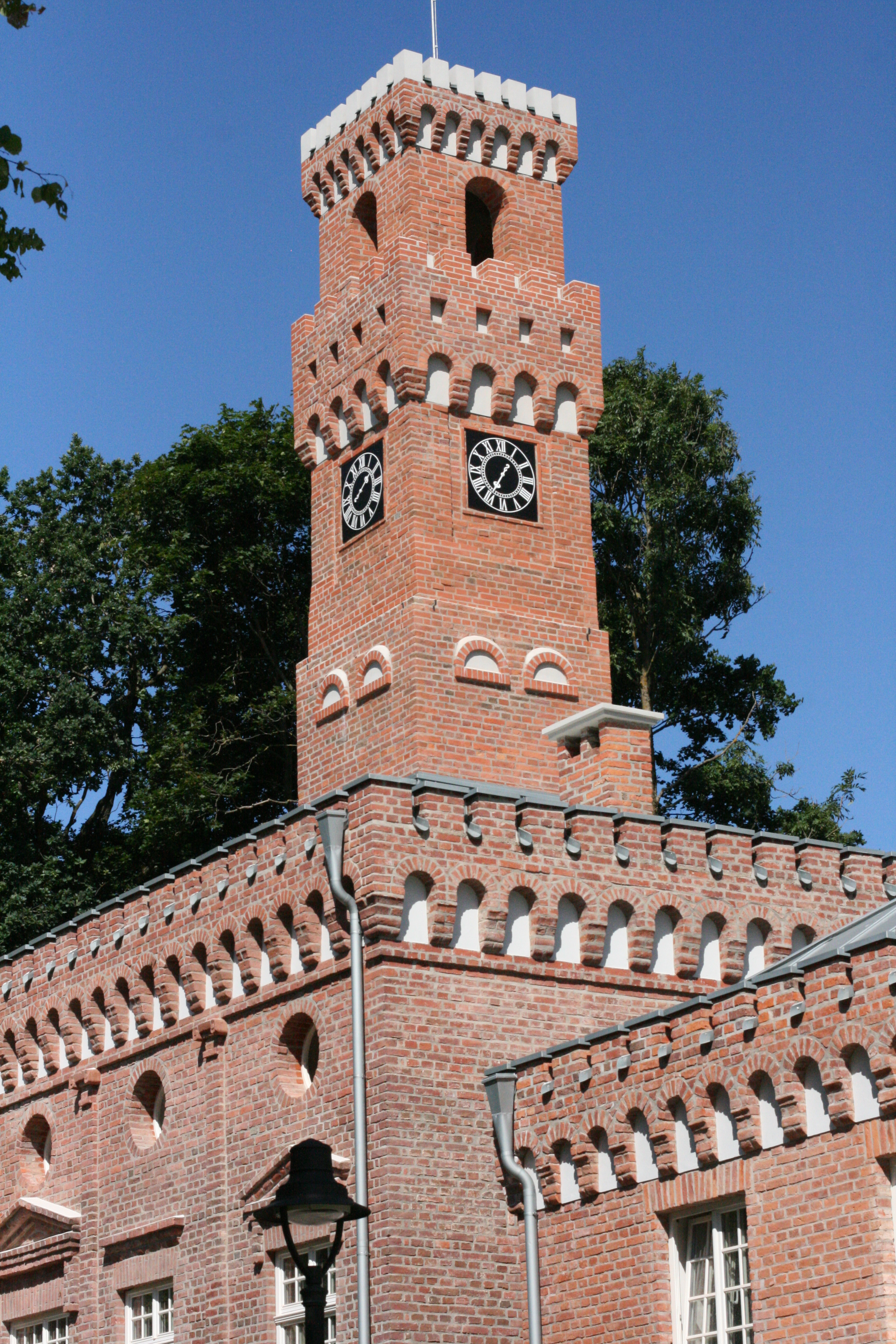
- Library's clock tower
- 55°54′58″N 21°50′49″E
- Location: Plungė, Telšiai County, Lithuania
- Branches: 18

Other information
- Director: Violeta Skierienė
- Website: www.plunge.rvb.lt/lt//

Plungė District Municipal Public Library is a public library located in the town of Plungė, county of Telšiai, Samogitian region, Lithuania. The library has branches around the town and in nearby villages.

The current library is located in a historical building in Plungė park.

== History ==
=== Zubov's era ===
After the 3rd partition of the Polish–Lithuanian Commonwealth, which occurred in 1795, Catherine II, the ruler of the Russian Empire, for loyalty to the tsar's throne and zealous service, offered 170,000 acres of land to Platon Zubov (1767–1822), who was one of the initiators of the Two Nations partition. In 1806 Count Platon Zubov bought the Plungė estate with the surrounding buildings from Vikentij Potocki. Thus, the period of Zubovai ruling in Plungė began, and it lasted 67 years (1806–1873). The documents, recorded memories, stories and legends of this period have remained up to now.

Platon Zubov ruled Plungė until his death in 1822. The only legitimate heir to Platon Zubov, daughter Alexandra (1822–1824), who was born after his death, died at the age of just 2. Platon's relatives did not agree that a large inheritance of the Count would accrue only to his wife. Accordingly, the assets were distributed among Platon Zubov's brothers and their children. In the absence of historical sources, it is very difficult to figure out who in Zubov's family inherited Plungė's estates after the death of Platon. Well-known documents of the archives are sparse, and the secondary sources contradictory. So far it has remained unclear whether all Plungė possessions inherited from Platon went to one heir, or whether they were distributed among a few family representatives.

In the Zubovai family genealogical tree diagram there are two possible versions of ruling Plungė possessions after the death of Platon Zubov, i. e. during the period from 1822 until 1873 when his brother Alexander's son Platon Zubov (1835–1890) sold the Plungė estate to Michał Mikołaj Ogiński. One of the genealogical tree branches belongs to Platon Zubov's brother Nicholas (1763–1805), who in 1822 was already dead. Thus, the Plungė estate lands might have been inherited by his son (Platon's nephew) Alexander (1797–1875), and later – the latter's son Platon Alexandrovich (1835–1890). Another branch shows that after the death of Platon Zubov, Plungė possessions could have been accrued to his brother Dimitri (1764–1836), and then – to Dimitri's son Nicholas (1801–1871).

=== Castle tower ===
In the 19th century the ruling period of Counts Zubovai was very important for Lithuania. Many representational and ceremonial buildings were constructed, roads were repaired, business was flourishing and educational and cultural institutions were established. Apparently, the Zubovai family who had many lands in other places of Lithuania was not residing in Plungė. They used to come here on business and built several buildings. A belfry of the church, All Saints Chapel in the old cemetery of Plungė, Italian-style Romantic Neo-Gothic style castle villa-conservatory in Plungė Park built by Zubovai have remained until today. The castle stands in the southern part of the park, about 300 metres away from the central palace. It was built in the middle of the 19th century during the Romantic Period when in the whole of Europe there was a tendency to follow the Middle Ages. It has a tower of 12 m in height, with a clock visible from all four sides. The clock has a very rare and unique anchor mechanism created by Parisian clockmaker Ž. L. Amant in 1741. Because of this clock, earlier the townspeople called it “dziegorinė”, later on and now – “laikrodine” (“clock tower”).

On the south side of the clock's foundations there is a record with the date – 1846. It is the oldest still extant building of the Plungė estate and the oldest known stone building in the whole of Plungė. This date indicates that the castle clock tower was built during the period of Zubovai ruling. According to the archaeological research, it was found that the castle was built on top of the foundations of another much older representative building in the 17th century, a large, five-room, U-shaped manor ensemble. In the middle of the 19th century next to the castle clock tower a greenhouse was built. Archaeologists have found that the northern and eastern stone walls of the former 17th century building were used for building the northern walls of the castle and greenhouse, and also for building the eastern wall of the conservatory's stove; the foundation of the old building middle wall was used to build the southern walls of the castle and conservatory.

The castle clock tower is similar to the Palazzo Vecchio palace in Florence. It's like a small copy of this palace. The construction of the Palazzo Vecchio palace, by the Italian architect Arnolfo di Cambio (1245–1302), began in 1299. Documents still have not revealed why the castle of such construction was built in Plungė, and which member of the Zubov family had decided to build it. However, memories of the Zubov family representatives were recorded. Vladimir Zubov (1909–2007) wrote that Nicholas Dimitrijevic Zubov (1801–1871) had built a small Italian-style castle for his wife Alexandra de Raymond de Mormoiron (1807– 1839), who came from Marquis de Modena family and was born in Petersburg. Her father was Frenchman Gabriel (1774–1833), who was born in Paris and worked as an oberger master. In 1873 Duke Mykolas Oginskis bought the Plungė estate with a nice castle clock tower in the park from Count Platon Alexandrovich Zubov. Oginskis used the castle of Zubovai as a gardener's office and greenhouse. On the ground floor there lived a gardener, and on the first floor – a clockmaker. Therefore, during the period of Oginskiai ruling the castle was sometimes referred to as a gardener's house or greenhouse. The clock tower via a balcony was attached to another smaller building, next to which there was an extension – summer greenhouse – a large room separated with a glass wall. Flowers and vegetables grew in a close. Exotic plants used to be grown there: palms, grapes, pineapples.

=== War and postwar periods ===
During the interwar period, the Second World War and post-war years. the building was primarily used as accommodation. The remains of the conservatory were being gradually turned into greenhouses. At this time the castle tower's clock had already stopped working. During the Soviet Union period, the Young Pioneers organization was established in the castle.

When Lithuania regained its independence the facilities were closed and abandoned, leading to believe that this unique building was doomed to collapse. It was only until the proposal of a new site for Plungė Municipal Library that the clock tower castle was on the right path to serve a new purpose for the community. Various campaigns were held in order to make the dream come true.

In 2011 the castle tower's clock was restored by metal restorer Tadeušas Kvakšys. In October 2012 restoration and reconstruction work in the castle clock tower was finished, and Plungė District Municipal Public Library moved to the new building.

== Branch libraries ==
Currently Plungė District Municipal Public Library has branches in the following locations: Plungė’s branch library (J.Tumo - Vaižganto street 81, Plungė); Aleksandravas village; Alsėdžiai; Didvyčiai village; Gegrėnai village; Grumbliai village; Kantaučiai village; Kuliai; Narvaišiai village; Plateliai; Stalgėnai village; Staneliai village; Šateikiai village; Varkaliai village; Žemaičių Kalvarija; Žlibinai village.

Three libraries in Glaudžiai, Karklėnai and Kantaučiai villages have been recently closed by March 1, 2021 decision of Plungė’s municipality council No. T1-287.

Information from library’s website on 25 March 2022: https://www.plunge.rvb.lt/lt/struktura-ir-kontaktai1/110-straipsnis/734-miesto-miesteliu-ir-kaimu-bibliotekos

== European Voluntary Service ==
Plungė Library has been actively participating in various programs, including Erasmus+ and National volunteering. Volunteers make a significant contribution to the Library and diligently complete their assigned tasks.

- Meeting and greeting library customers;
- Helping and preparing various events within the library;
- Learning Lithuanian language;
- Meeting with non-governmental organizations;
- Gaining knowledge and awareness about history (culture, heritage) of Plungė region.
- Self-realization and many other creative tasks if they like.

== See also ==
- List of libraries in Lithuania
