= Jonas Avyžius Public Library =

Public library in Lithuania

Coordinates: 56°14′22″N 23°36′56″E

Jonas Avyžius Public Library of Joniškis District Municipality was founded in 1937 in Joniškis, Lithuania. Valentina Ivanovaitė became the first librarian. At the beginning the Library's collection consisted of 600 books placed in two rooms.

In 1940 the public library moved into premises near the centre of town. A lot of books were lost and only a few new books have recently been received. During the war, the library was visited mostly by children as the German establishment, which conscripted adults for forced labour in Germany was in the same building. After the War the library's situation was complicated by the lack of premises, furniture, or skilled employees, but libraries and reading rooms began opening in the villages and rural areas.

In 1951 the public library became the district library serving libraries in the district. In 1956 the first librarian having completed higher education in the field, Irena Bernotaitė-Rudokienė, had started as head of the library. The new head started to look for new premises, furniture, to and improve reader services. The library moved six times in that decade.

In 1976 all the libraries in the district were connected in a centralized system. Joniškis District Library became the District Central Library with 40 branches in the villages and 1 in Žagarė town.

On July 1, 1996, the library changed its name to Joniškis District Public Library. The premises of the library have been expanded and renovated. In 1996 the new reading room was set up. In 1998 the Department of Children's Literature was moved to the new premises.

In 2001 the Public Library received the Matas Slančiauskas Award for its ethnological activities. The library's specialists are involved in regional and national projects and programmes, organizing various literary, ethnological events and exhibitions.

Beginning in 2001, new technologies have been incorporated into the library making Joniškis Public Library capable of participating in LIBIS (Lithuanian Integrated Library Information System) and allowing creation of a computer catalogue. The records and descriptions of articles of regional periodical publications are presented to the LIBIS Unified catalogue.

In 2004 the public library was named in honour of Jonas Avyžius, one of the most famous Lithuanian writers, who was born near Joniškis. Now, the public library consists of 5 departments: Completing and filing of documents, Readers’ service, Bibliographical and Information, Children's Literature, Methodical and 23 branches. The branch of the town of Žagarė and the other 4 branches in the villages are computerized.

In 2004 a Mobile library was organized. It serves the residents of 7 villages.

== See also ==
- List of libraries in Lithuania
