= Library of Jonava =

Library in Jovana, Lithuania

Coordinates: 55°04′25″N 24°16′39″E

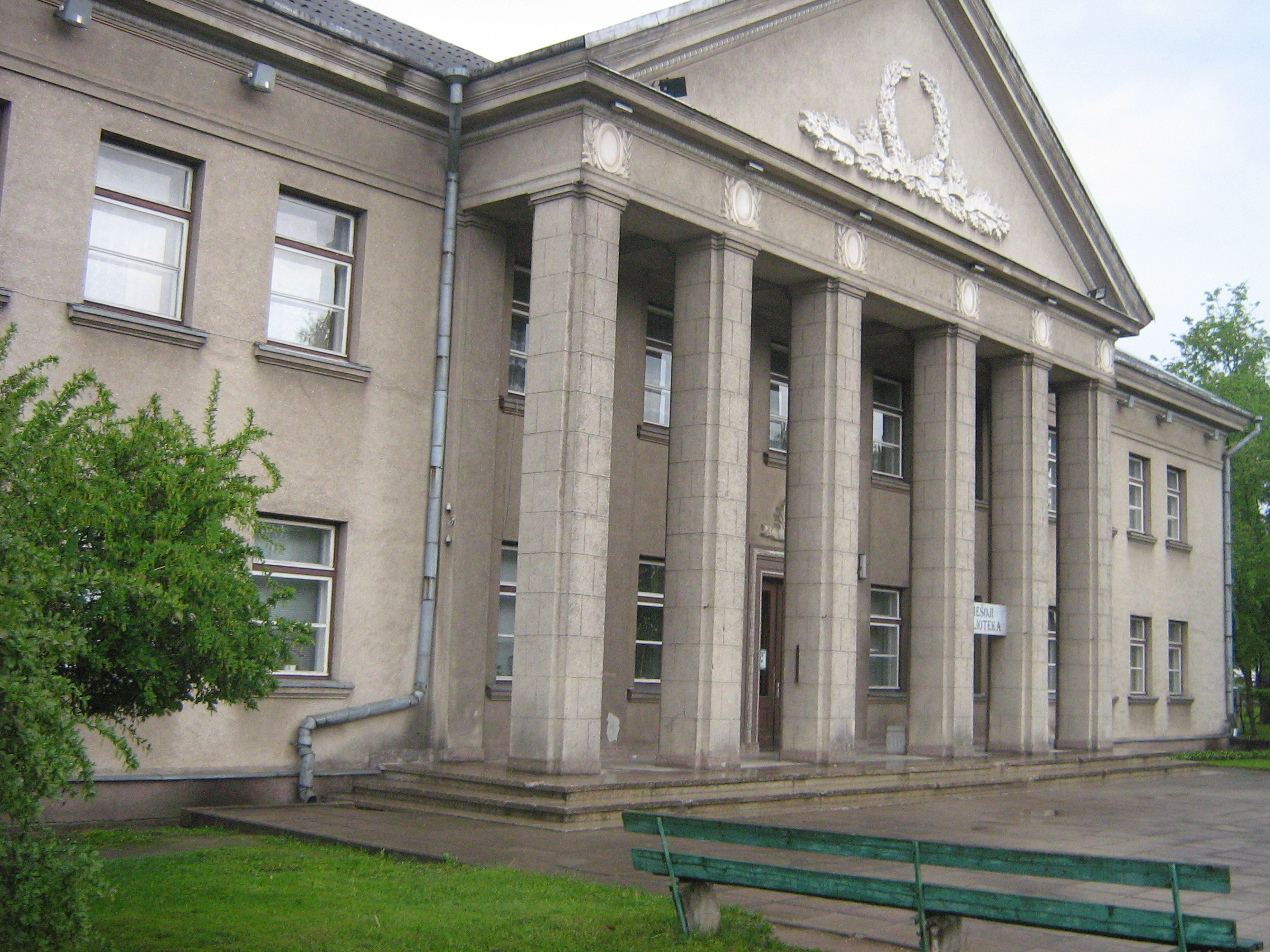
- Location: Žeimių g. 9 Jonava, Lithuania
- Established: 1939

Other information
- Director: Skirmutė Gajauskaitė
- Website: Official website

Library of Jonava or Public library of Jonava district municipality (Lithuanian: Jonavos rajono savivaldybės viešoji biblioteka) is a public library in the town of Jonava, Lithuania. It currently serves a population size that is between 10,000 and 100,000.

During World War II, the library was closed and all books were destroyed. From 1945 to 1946, the public library was re-opened.

== See also ==
- List of libraries in Lithuania
