= Piotrków Trybunalski Ghetto =

Nazi ghetto in occupied Poland

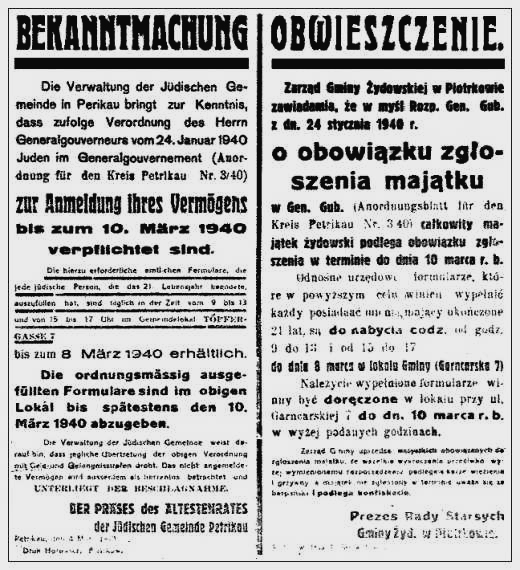
- Ghetto announcement, 24 January 1940 at Piotrków Trybunalski
- Location: Piotrków Trybunalski, German-occupied Poland; 51°24′34″N 19°42′06″E
- Incident type: Imprisonment, forced labor, starvation
- Organizations: SS
- Camp: Treblinka, Majdanek
- Victims: 28,000 Polish Jews

The Piotrków Trybunalski Ghetto (Yiddish: פּיִעטריקאָװ) was created in Piotrków Trybunalski on October 8, 1939, shortly after the 1939 German Invasion of Poland in World War II. It was the first Nazi ghetto in occupied Europe. founded on October 8, 1939 The town was occupied by the Wehrmacht on September 5, 1939. Piotrków was made into a county seat (Kreis) of the newly created Łódź District (Regierungsbezirk Litzmannstadt) of the German territory of Reichsgau Wartheland. The ghetto was put under the command of Hans Drexler, an appointed Nazi Oberbürgermeister who also created the ghetto. In total, some 16,500 to up to 28,000 Jews went through the Piotrków Ghetto which was liquidated beginning 14 October 1942 in four days of deportations to Treblinka and Majdanek aboard overcrowded Holocaust trains.

== History ==
The Piotrków Ghetto was the first wartime ghetto of its kind. Set up in one of Poland's oldest cities with a thriving Jewish community, it took until late January 1940 for the new inmates to move into it. First, the Judenrat (Jewish Council) was established and ordered to issue an announcement about the relocation, but this had no effect. Consequently, the Germans themselves evicted the Jews from their homes, transferring them to the ghetto by force. Eventually, up to 28,000 Jews were squeezed into a part of town where only 6,000 people previously lived. The homes vacated by the Jews were assigned to Christians and members of the German minority who took over their businesses after the relocation. It was an open type ghetto –- an early variant of Nazi ghettoization -– without the barbed wire fences introduced later throughout all of occupied Poland. Only warning signs with skulls were placed along the boundaries, and the main gate erected. The ghetto was pronounced closed from the outside on October 28, 1939.

The initial population of about 10,000 Jews were not required to use permits to move around town, but shootings by Ordnungspolizei became commonplace and a curfew in the ghetto was introduced. The influx of refugees expelled from other places, including Warsaw, Łódź, Bełchatów, Kalisz, Gniezno and Płock, caused the ghetto population to more than double by 1942. Jews were not allowed to use main streets. Many were sent as slave labor to prewar factories taken over by the Germans, including Hortensja Glassworks (pl), the Kara industrial glass factory, and the Bugaj wood factory on the lake (pl). Captured Jews were sent to build new fortifications and ditches. More Jewish refugees and displaced persons came from neighbouring villages as well.

== Liquidation of the ghetto ==
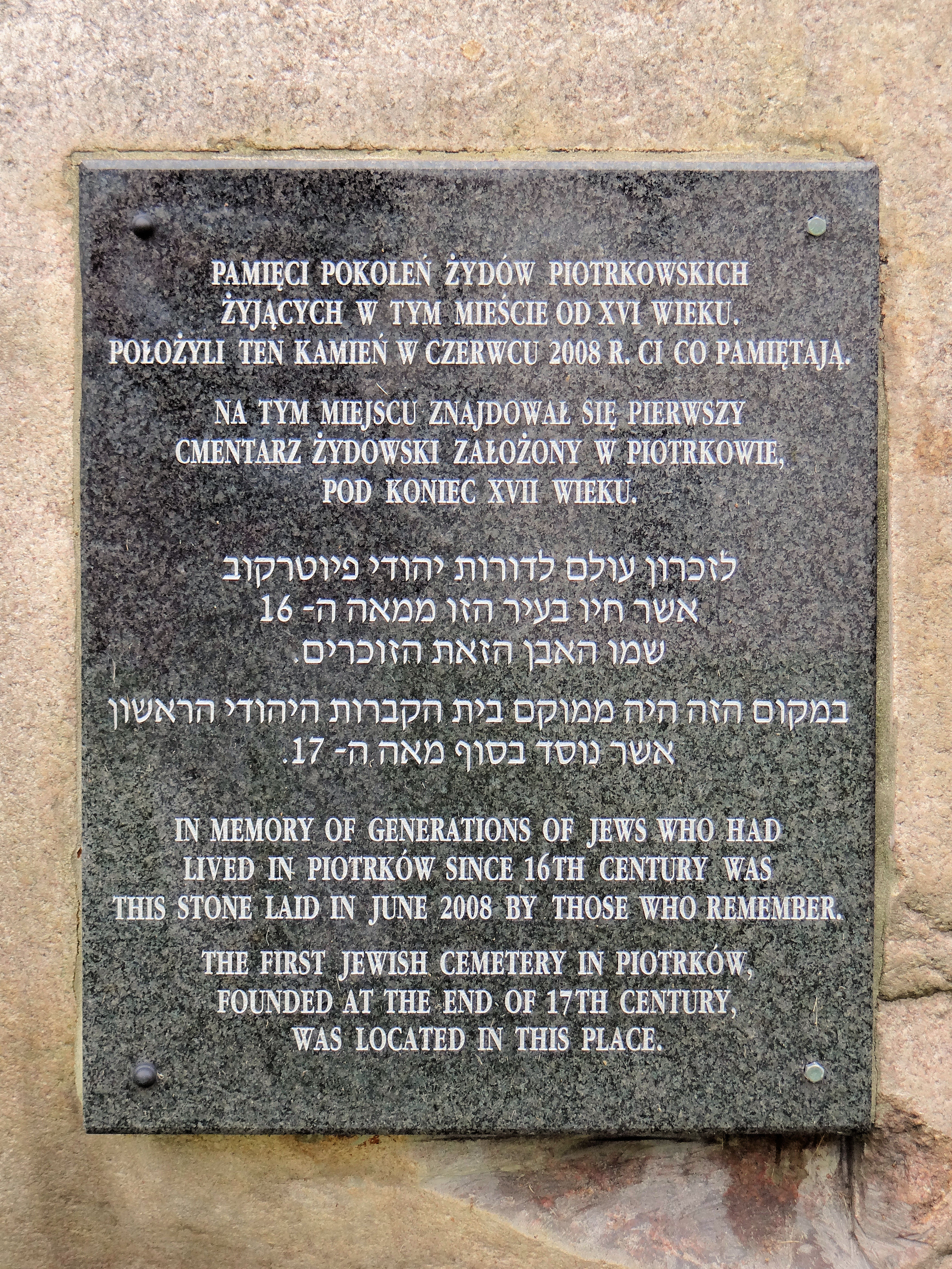
Commemorative plaque at the former historic Jewish cemetery

The ghetto liquidation action began on the night of October 13, 1942, commanded by SS-Hauptsturmführer Willy Blum. About 1,000 Jews unable to move were shot in their homes for "insubordination". By the next morning, some 22,000 Jews were herded onto the square by the synagogue in order to undergo a "selection". In the course of the next few days, Jews were marched in columns to the railway station and loaded onto the awaiting freight trains without food or water, 150 to one car.

Following the 1942 deportations to Majdanek and Treblinka death camps, some 3,500 Jewish factory workers still remained in the small ghetto. However, mass executions became more frequent in 1943, even inside the depleted synagogue, in the Jewish cemetery, and at an execution site near Raków. By 1944 only 1,000 Jews were still alive. As the Soviet front began to approach, they were loaded onto freight trains and sent to Buchenwald and Ravensbrück, never to return.

== See also ==
- The Holocaust in Poland
- Jewish ghettos in German-occupied Poland
