= Piotrków Trybunalski =

- City county
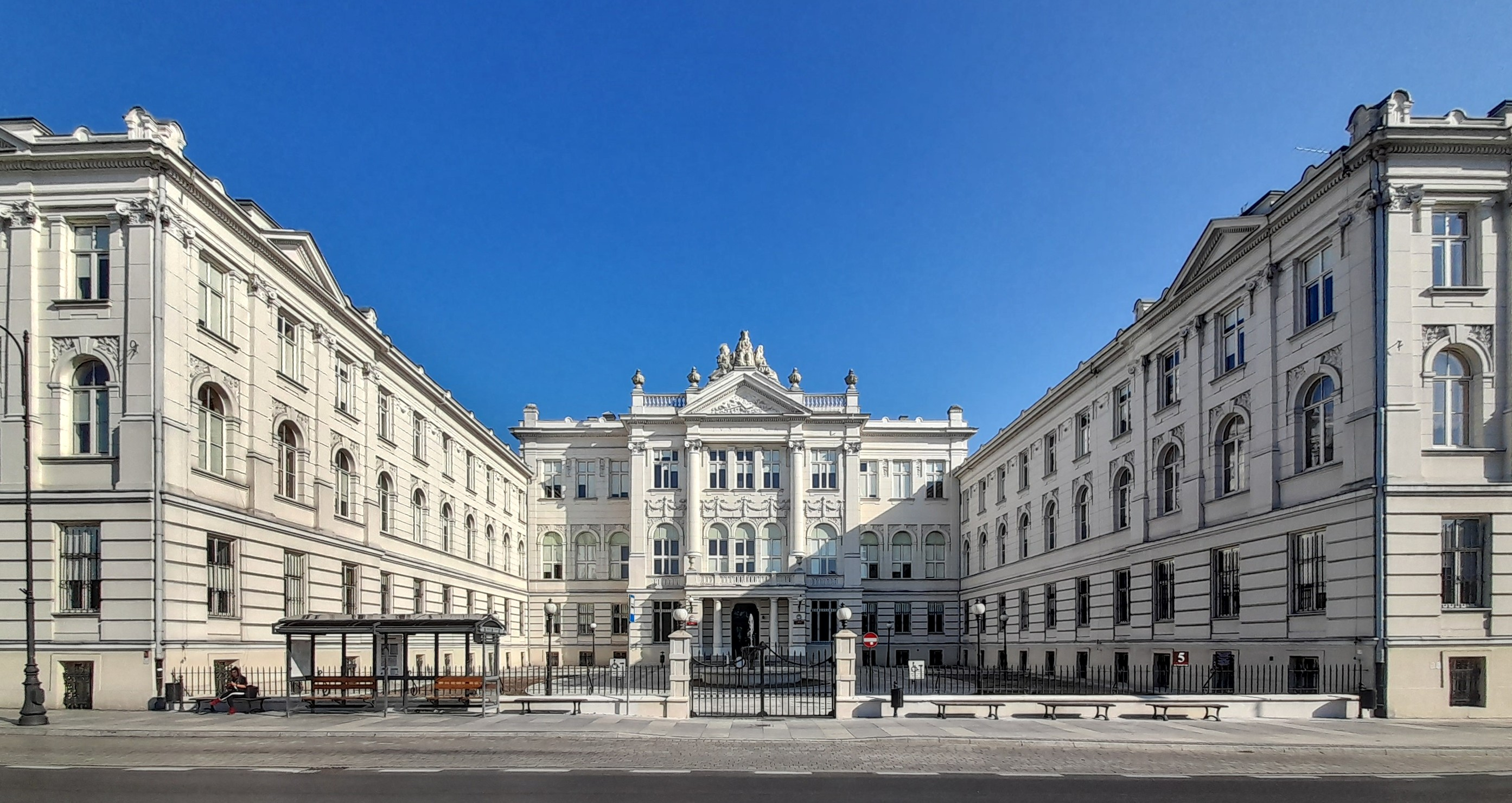
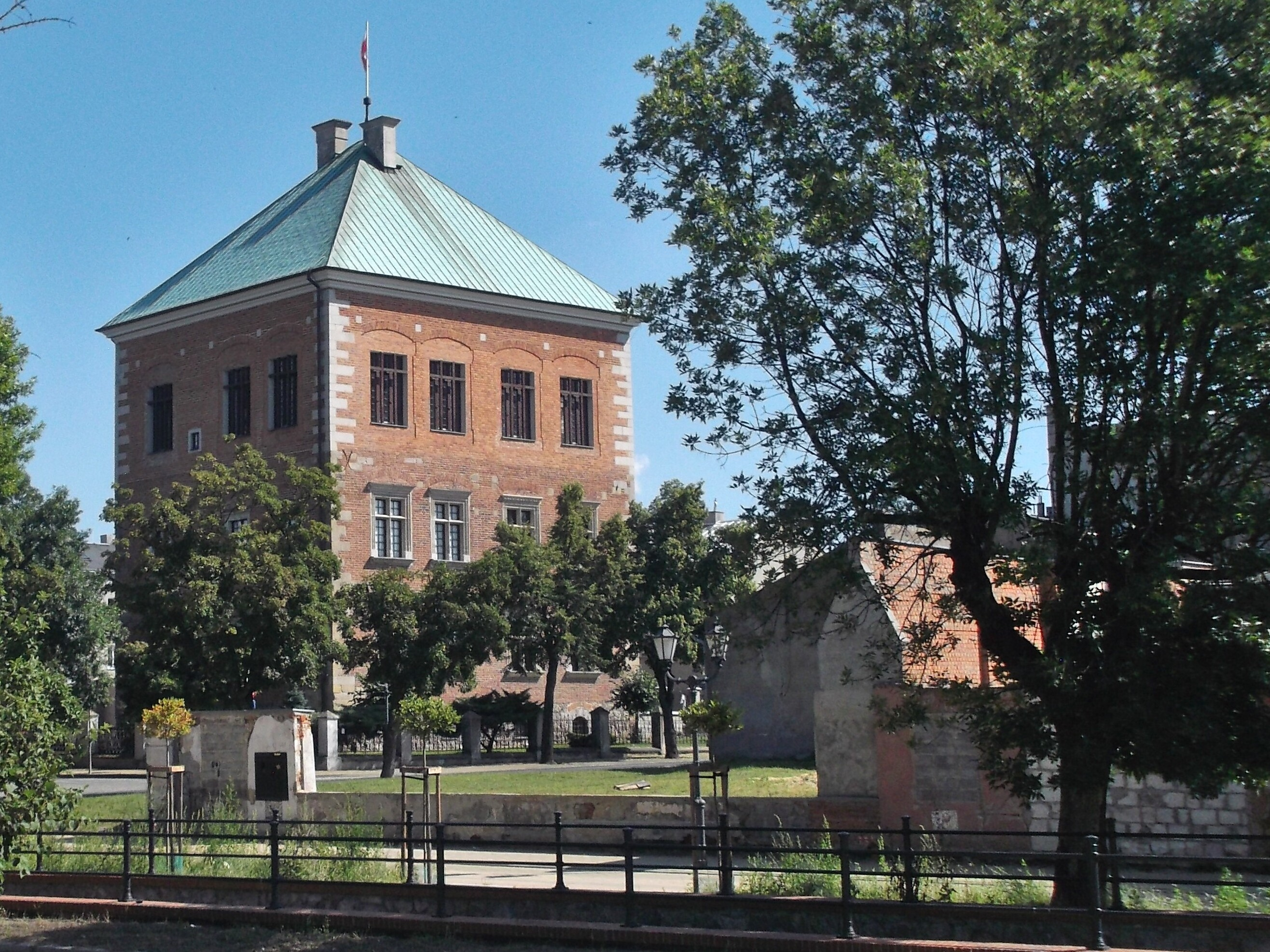
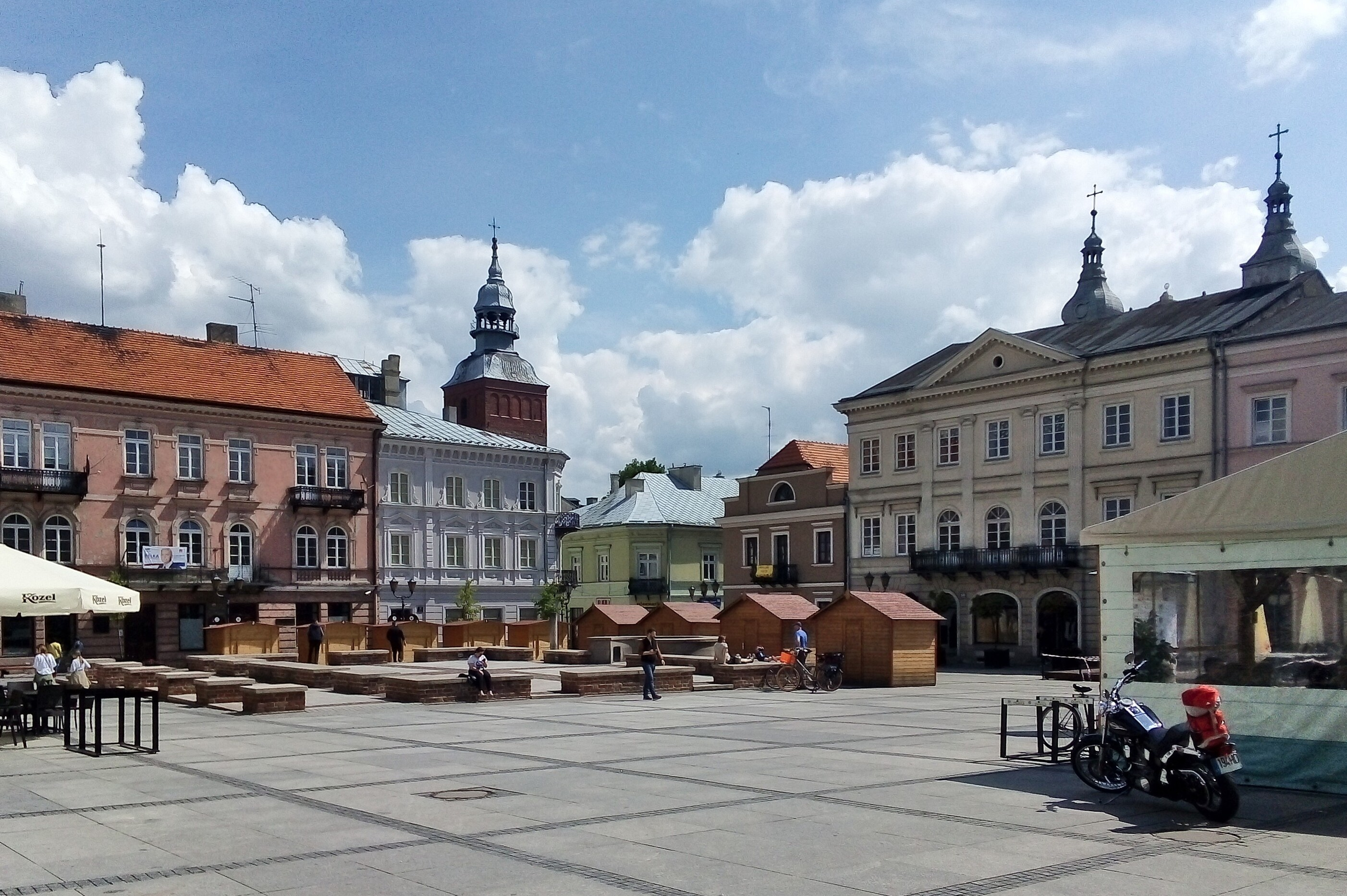
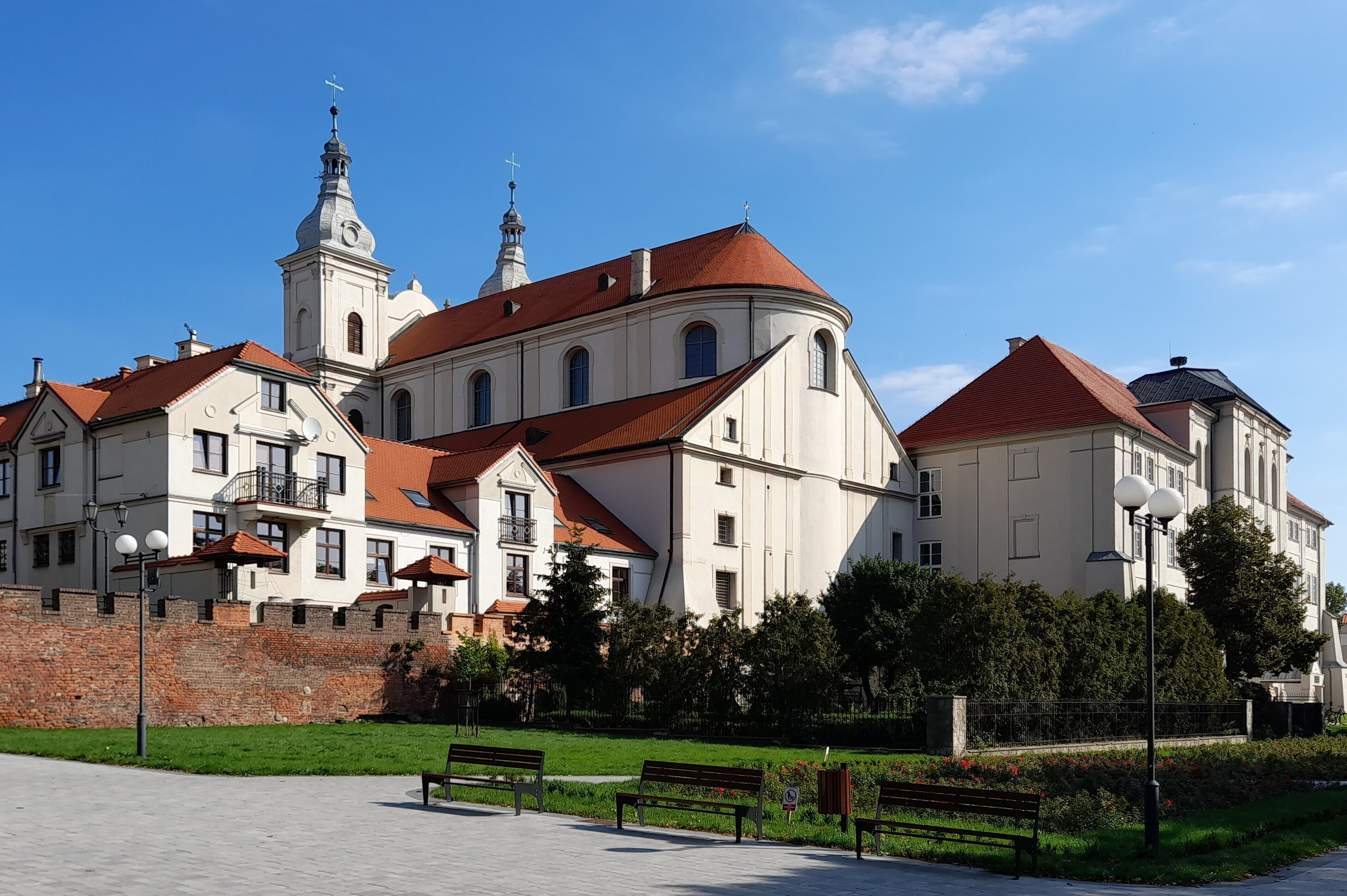
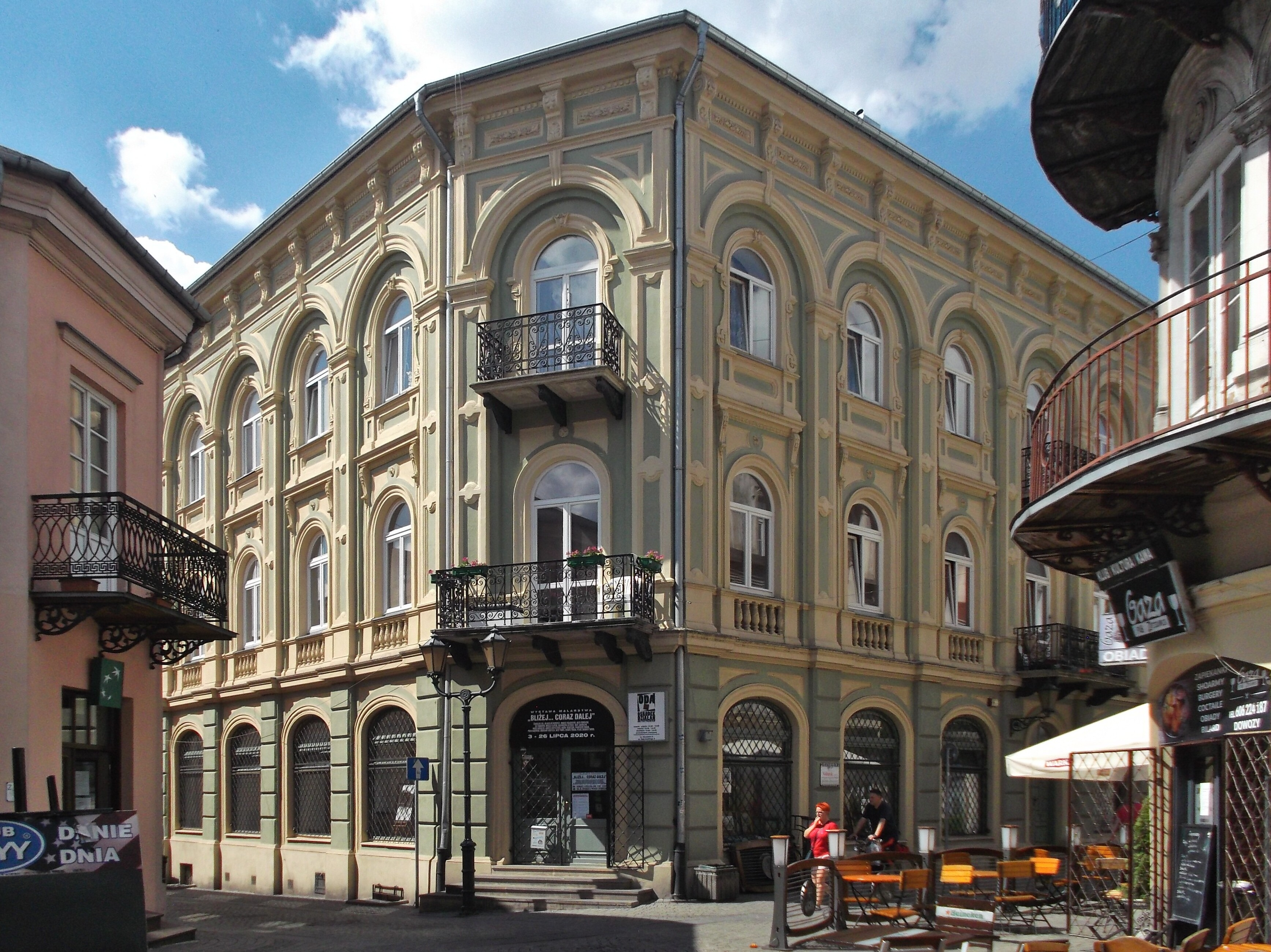
- Regional Court Royal Castle Market Square Jesuit Monastery Sieradzka Street

- Flag Coat of arms

- Location within Poland
- Coordinates: 51°24′N 19°41′E
- Country: Poland
- Voivodeship: Łódź
- County: city county
- Established: before 1217
- Town rights: 13th century

Government
  - Mayor: Juliusz Wiernicki (KO)

Area
  - Total: 67.27 km^{2} (25.97 sq mi)

Population (31 December 2021)
  - Total: 71,252 ▼
- Time zone: UTC+1 (CET)
  - Summer (DST): UTC+2 (CEST)
- Postal code: 97–300 to 97–312
- Area code: +48 044
- Car plates: EP
- Website: https://www.piotrkow.pl

Piotrków Trybunalski ([ˈpʲɔtrkuf trɨbuˈnalskʲi]; also known by alternative names), often simplified to Piotrków, is a city in central Poland with 71,252 inhabitants (2021). It is the capital of Piotrków County and the second-largest city in the Łódź Voivodeship.

Founded in the late Middle Ages, Piotrków was once a royal city and holds an important place in Polish history; the first parliament sitting was held here in the 15th century. It then became the seat of a Crown Tribunal, the highest court of the Polish–Lithuanian Commonwealth. The city also hosted one of Poland's oldest Jewish communities, which was entirely destroyed by the Holocaust. The old town in Piotrków features many historical and architectural monuments, including tenements, churches, synagogues and the medieval Royal Castle.

== Etymology and other names ==
According to tradition, but not confirmed by historical sources, Piotrków was founded by Piotr Włostowic, a powerful 12th century magnate from Silesia. The name of the city comes from the Polish version of the name Peter (Piotr), in a diminutive form (Piotrek, or "Pete"). Trybunalski indicates that tribunal sessions (including the Crown Tribunal) were held in the town. The town has been known in Yiddish as Petrikev (פּעטריקעװ), in German as Petrikau, and in Russian as Petrokov (Петроков).

== Location, demographics and statistics ==
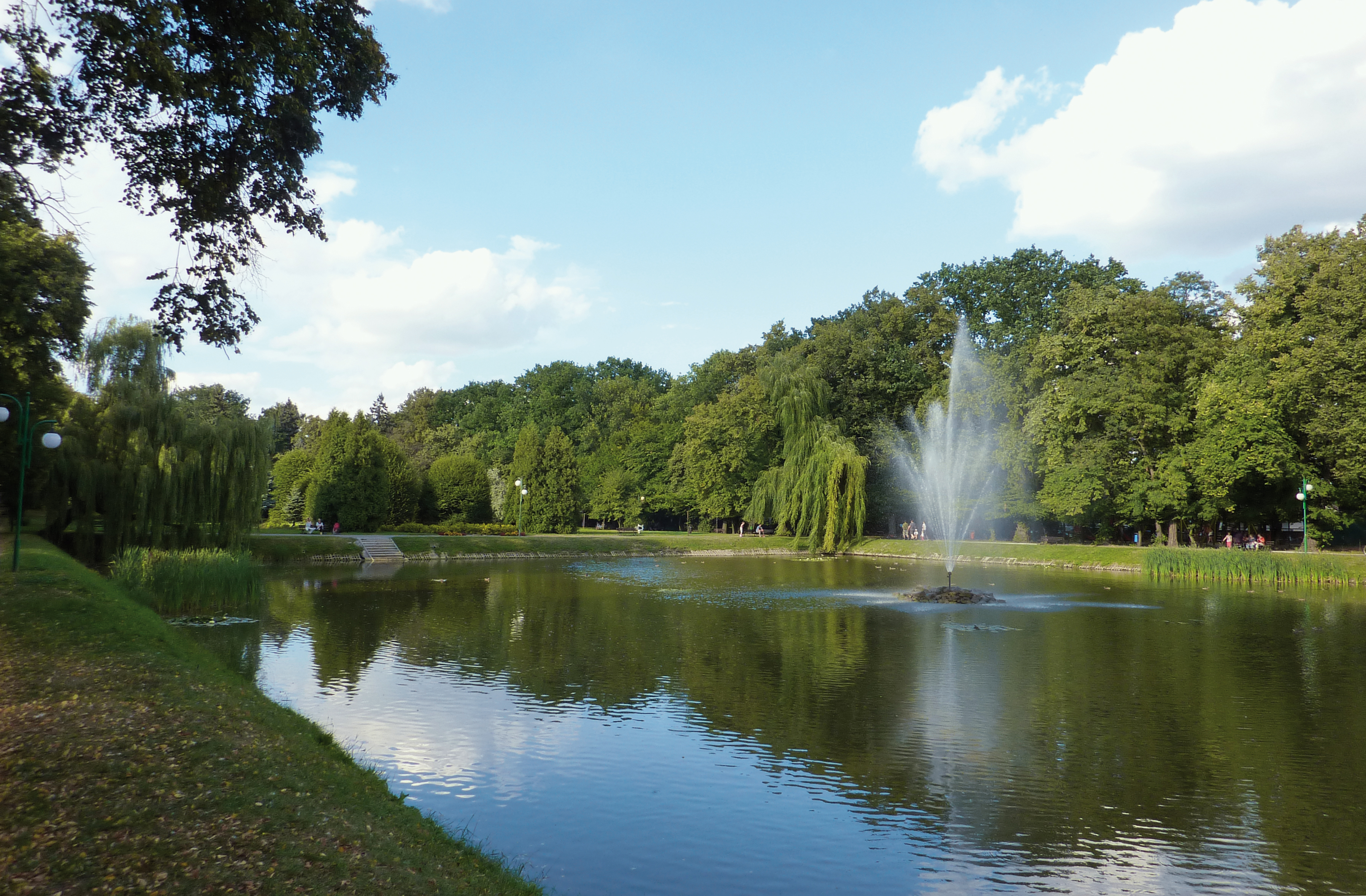
Poniatowski Park

Piotrków Trybunalski is situated in the middle-west part (Piotrków Plains) of the Łódź Uplands. The population of the city is approximately 80,000 and its area is nearly 68 square kilometres (26 sq mi). The landscape of the Piotrków region and its geological structure was formed during the glaciation of 180,000–128,000 years ago. There are hardly any forests on the Piotrków Plains.

Two rivers cross the region, the Wolbórka and the Luciąża, which with their tributaries flow into the Pilica River and belong to the catchment area of the Vistula River. The watershed of Poland's two main rivers, the Vistula and the Oder (Odra), runs along the meridional line three km west of Piotrków. Two small rivers, the Strawa and the Strawka flow through the city, and it is between their valleys that the first settlement of Piotrków was founded in the early Middle Ages. Recently two more rivers have been included within the boundary of the city area—the Wierzejka, which in the western part of the city forms a reservoir, and the Śrutowy Dołek to the south of Piotrków.

The city is 200 m (656.17 ft) above sea level. The average temperature during the year is about 8 °C (46 °F), the coldest month is January (ranging from −20 to 2.5 °C (−4.0 to 36.5 °F)), the warmest is July (with 18 °C (64 °F) on average). Yearly rainfall is from 550 to 600 mm (22 to 24 in). The sandy soil of the region is not fertile.

== History ==
=== Middle Ages ===
In the early Middle Ages the Piotrków region was part of the province of Łęczyca of Poland ruled by the Piast dynasty. In c. 1264 it became part of a separate principality. The foundation of the city and its development were connected with its geographical position and the advantageous arrangement of the roads linking the provinces of Poland in Piast times. At first, a market town and a place of the princes' tribunals (in the 13th and 15th centuries), Piotrków became an administrative center (the capital of the district since 1418), and in later centuries it also became an important political center in Poland. The first record of Piotrków is in a document issued in 1217 by Polish monarch Leszek I the White, where there is a mention of the duke's tribunal held "in Petrecoue". Medieval Piotrków was a trading place on the trade routes from Pomerania to Russia and Hungary, and later from Masovia to Silesia.

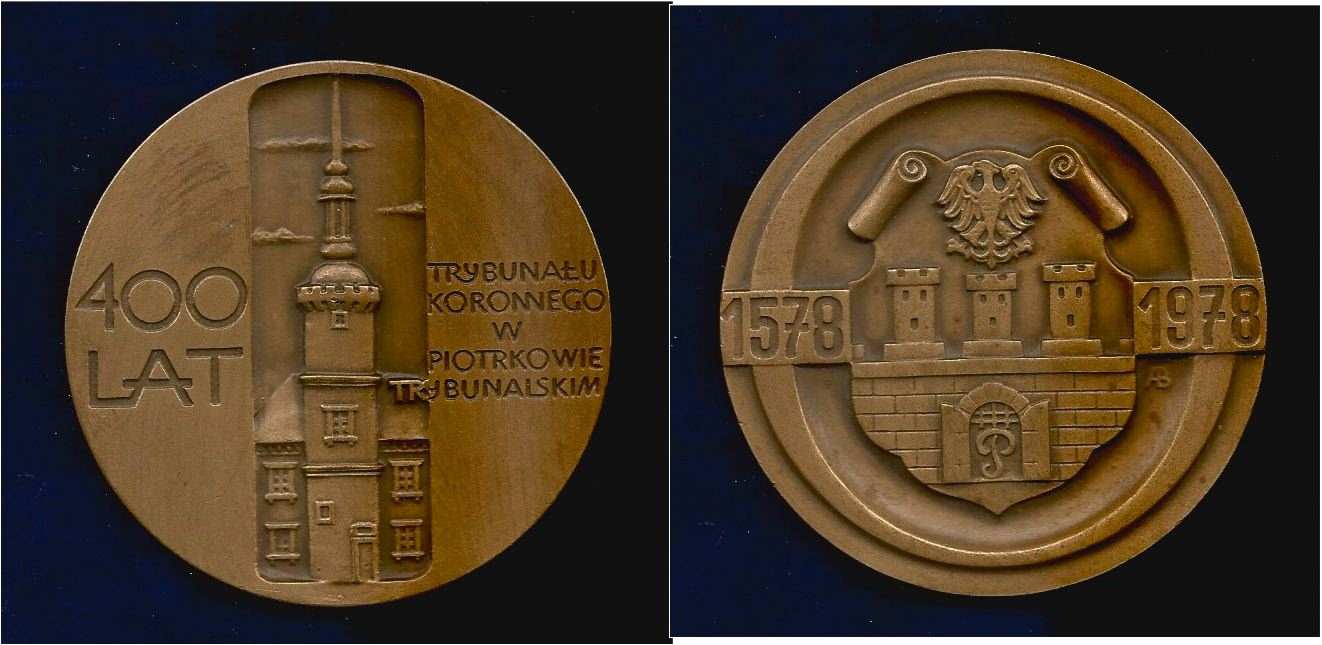
Polish medallion from 1978 commemorating the 400th anniversary of the Crown Tribunal, then the highest court of Poland in Piotrków Trybunalski.

During the 13th century, apart from the tribunals, Polish provincial princes made Piotrków the seat of some assemblies of the Sieradz knights, which according to historical sources were held in 1233, in 1241, and in 1291. It might have been during the 1291 assembly that the Prince of Sieradz, Władysław I the Elbow-high, granted Piotrków civic rights, because in documents from the beginning of the 14th century he mentions "civitate nostra Petricouiensi".

The first certificate of foundation and the other documents were burnt in a great fire which destroyed the city around 1400. The privileges and rights were re-granted by King Władysław II Jagiełło in 1404. The city walls were built during the reign of King Casimir III the Great, and after the great fire, they were rebuilt at the beginning of the 15th century. During the reign of Casimir III, many expelled German Jews from the Holy Roman Empire migrated to the town, which grew to have one of the largest Jewish settlements in the kingdom.

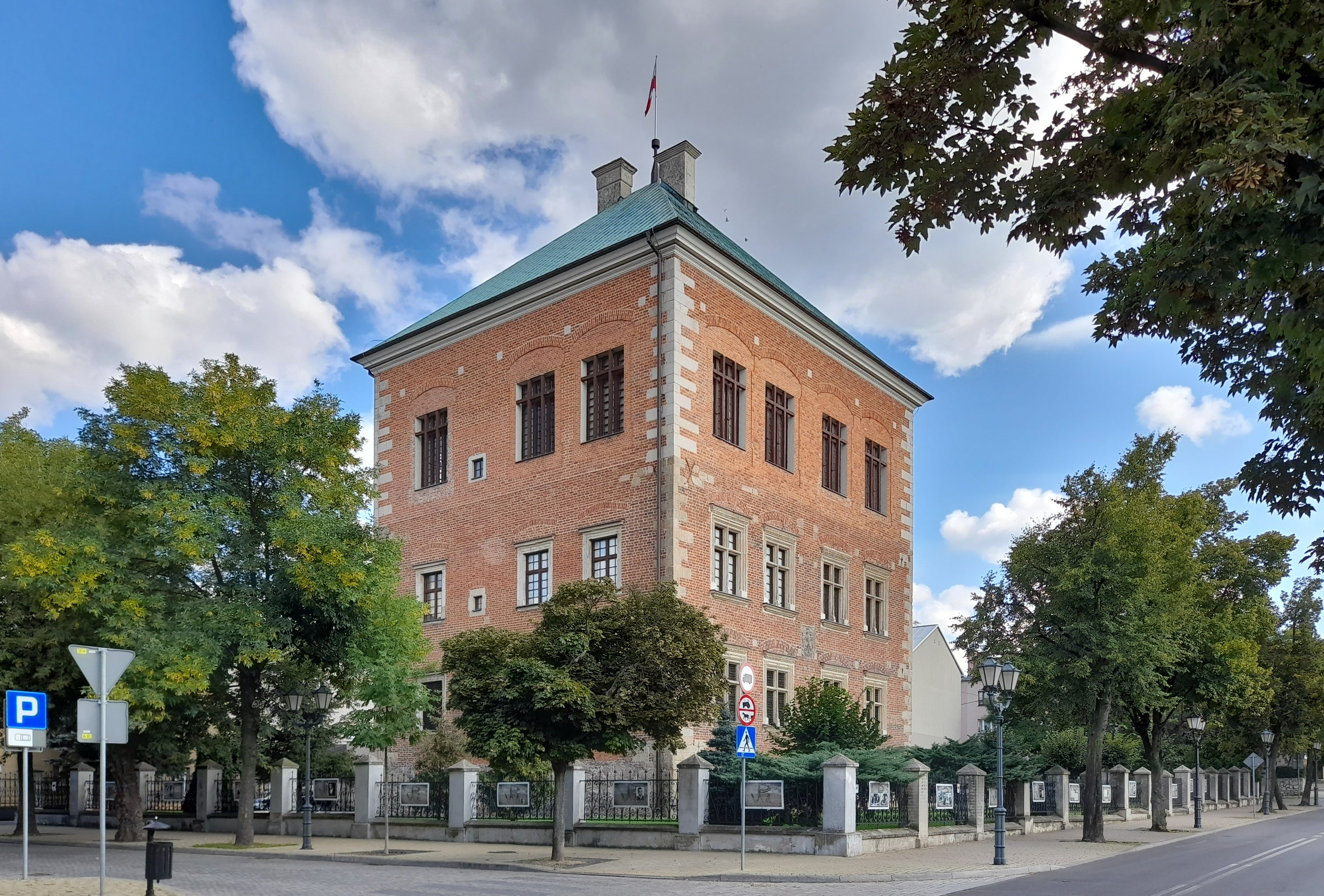
Gothic-Renaissance Royal Castle, now a museum

Between 1354 and 1567 the city held general assemblies of Polish knights, and general or elective meetings of the Polish Sejm (during the latter Polish kings of the Jagiellon dynasty were elected there). In Piotrków, two Grand Masters of the Teutonic Order pledged allegiance to Polish King Casimir IV Jagiellon in 1469 and 1470. It was in the city of Piotrków that the Polish Parliament was given its final structure with the division into an Upper House and Lower Chamber in 1493. King John I Albert published his "Piotrków privilege" on 26 May 1493, which expanded the privileges of the szlachta (nobility) at the expense of the bourgeoisie and the peasantry.

=== Modern period ===
Piotrków became part of the Polish–Lithuanian Commonwealth in 1569. When the seat of the Parliament was moved to Warsaw, the town became the seat of the highest court of Poland, the Crown Tribunal, and trials were held there from 1578 to 1793; the highest Lithuanian court was held in Grodno. Piotrków's Jewish population was expelled in 1578 and only allowed back a century later. The town became a post station in 1684. Around 1705, German settlers (often Swabians) arrived in the town's vicinity and founded villages; they largely retained their customs and language until their expulsion in 1945.

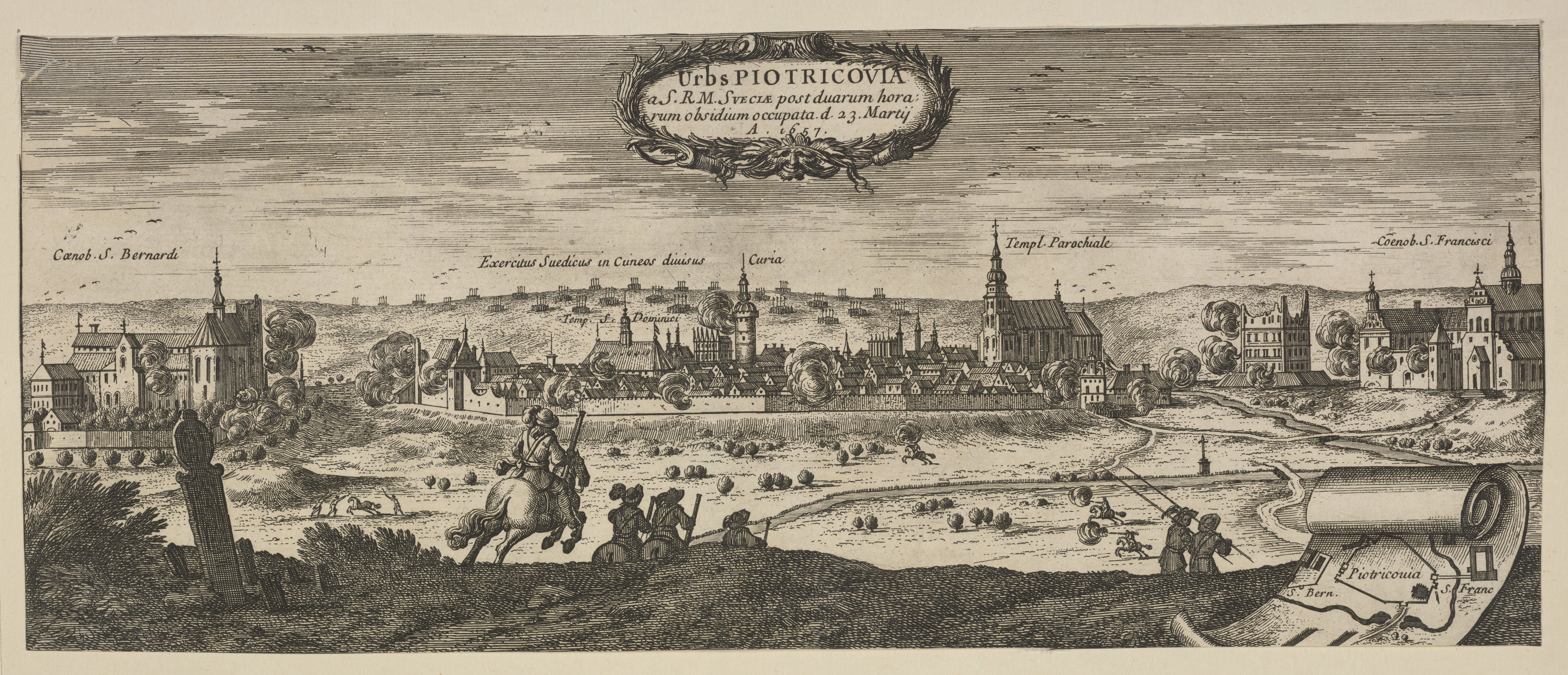
Piotrków in 1657

While the importance of Piotrków in the political life of the country had contributed to its development in the 16th century, the city declined in the 17th and 18th centuries, due to fires, epidemics, wars against Sweden, and finally the Partitions of Poland. One of two main routes connecting Warsaw and Dresden ran through the city in the 18th century and Kings Augustus II the Strong and Augustus III of Poland often traveled that route.

The first official inventory of important buildings in Poland, A General View of the Nature of Ancient Monuments in the Kingdom of Poland, led by Kazimierz Stronczyński from 1844 to 1855, describes the Great Synagogue of Piotrków as one of Poland's architecturally notable buildings.

In 1793, the Kingdom of Prussia annexed the town in the Second Partition of Poland and administered it as part of the Province of South Prussia. During the Napoleonic Wars, Piotrków became part of the Duchy of Warsaw (1807–15) and was a district seat in the Kalisz Department. After the defeat of Napoleon in 1815, Piotrków became part of Congress Poland, a puppet state of the Russian Empire.

When the Warsaw–Vienna railway was built in 1846, there was a slight increase in the economic and industrial development of Piotrków.

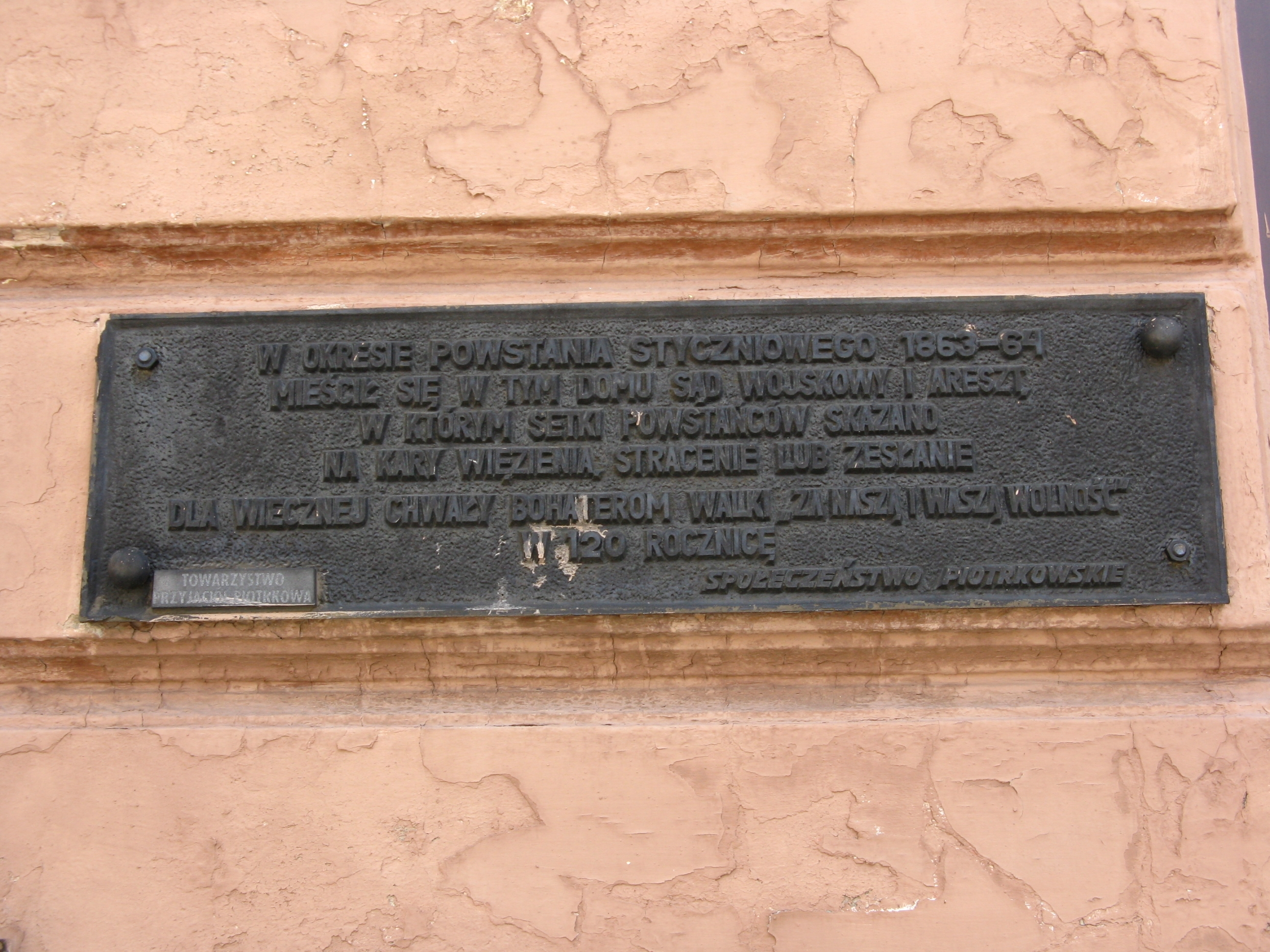
Memorial plaque at the site of the former prison for Polish insurgents of 1863–1864

In January 1863, the Polish January Uprising broke out. Among local Polish insurgents were many young people and Poles conscripted into the Russian army, who were stationed in the city. The Russians established a prison for captured insurgents in Piotrków. Thousands of Poles passed through the prison, were subjected to flagellation and tortures, and then either deported to the Warsaw Citadel or to Siberia, or executed in Piotrków. Two insurgents, wanting to escape from torture, committed suicide by jumping out of the prison windows. As punishment for supporting the uprising, the Russians closed down the Bernardine monastery in 1864, and the last Bernardine monks were expelled in 1867.

In 1867 the Russian authorities formed the Piotrków Governorate, which included Łódź, Częstochowa, and the coal fields of Dąbrowa Górnicza and Sosnowiec. According to the Russian census of 1897, out of the total population of 30,800, Jews constituted 9,500 (around 31% percent). The province had the best developed industry of all of Congress Poland until 1914. Many Poles demonstrated and went on strike during the 1905 Russian Revolution.

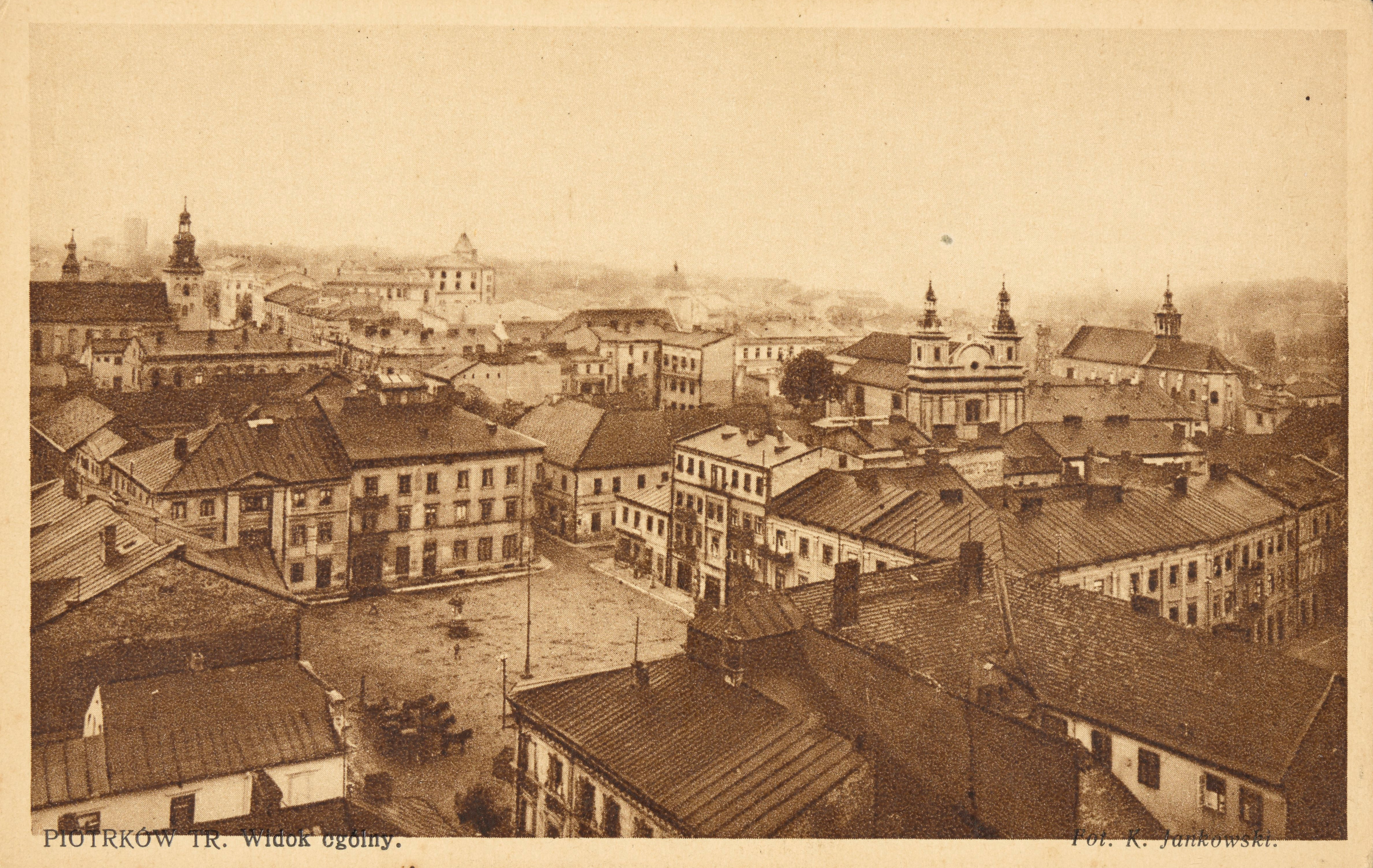
Old Town in the 1930s

During World War I, Piotrków was occupied by Austria-Hungary. From 1915 to 1916, it was a center for Polish patriotic activity. The city was a seat of the Military Department of the National Committee, and a headquarters for the Polish Legions, which were voluntary troops organized by Józef Piłsudski, Władysław Sikorski and others to fight against Russia. Piotrków became part of restored independent Poland in 1918, following the defeat of the Central Powers in the war.

In the interwar period, Piotrków was the capital of Piotrków County in the Łódź Voivodeship, and lost its previous importance. In 1922, the old monastery was restored to the Bernardines. In 1938 the town had 51,000 inhabitants, including 25,000 Jews and 1,500 Germans. The town had a large Jewish settlement and until the Holocaust a thriving Hebrew printing and publishing industry.

=== World War II ===
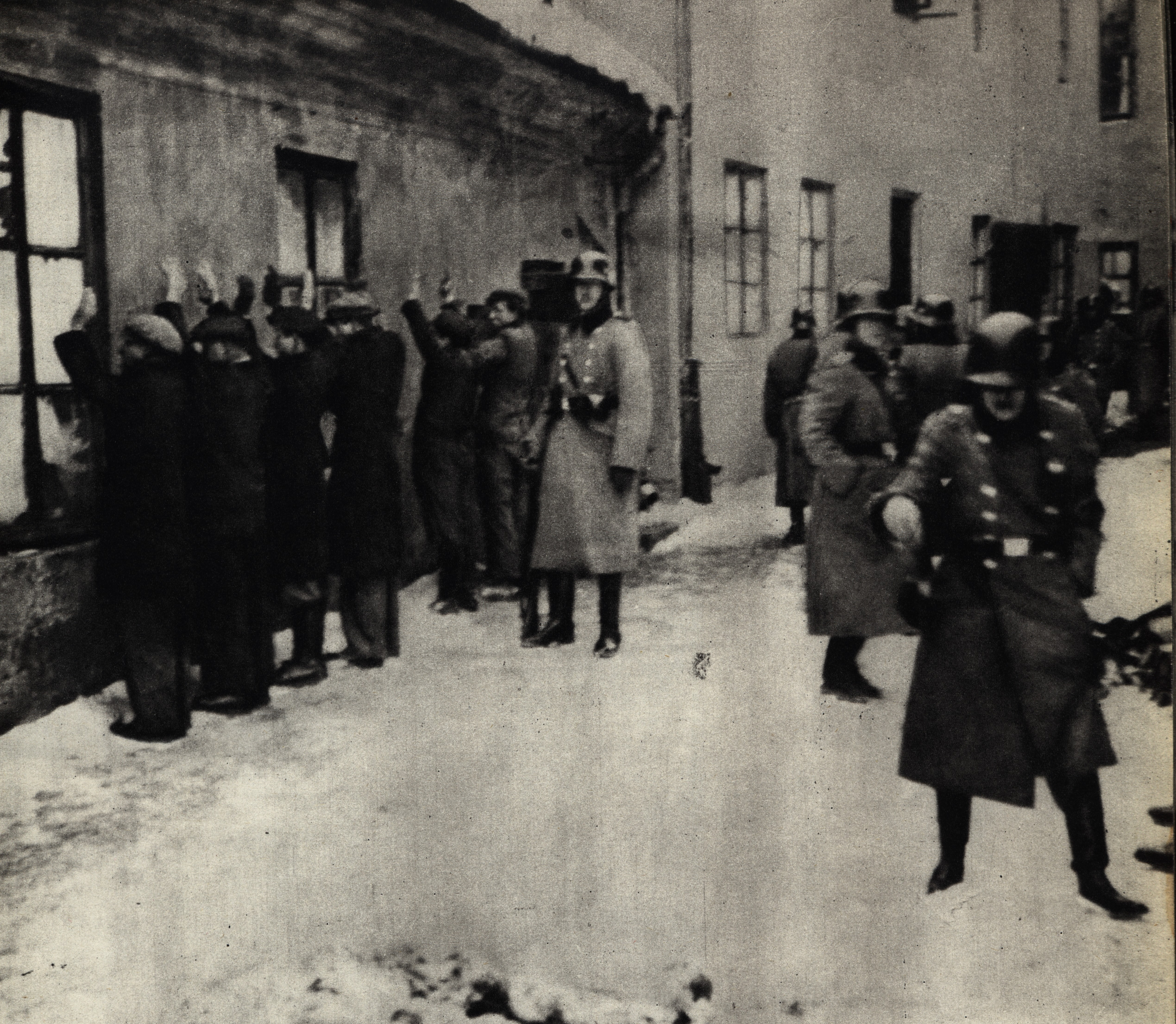
A roundup in German-occupied Piotrków Trybunalski

During the invasion of Poland at the beginning of World War II, Piotrków was the setting for fierce fighting between the Polish 19th Infantry Division and the 16th Panzer Corps of the German Wehrmacht on 5 September 1939. On the next day, German troops committed a massacre of Polish prisoners of war, including 19 officers, in the present-day neighbourhood of Moryca (see also German atrocities committed against Polish prisoners of war). The Einsatzgruppe II then entered the city to commit various crimes against the population. The town was occupied by Nazi Germany for the following six years.

In autumn of 1939, the Germans carried out mass arrests of dozens of Poles, including teachers, local activists, judges, parliamentarians, editors and bank employees, however some were later released. 47 Poles arrested in Tomaszów Mazowiecki, including Tomaszów's mayor, were also imprisoned in Piotrków. Further mass arrests of hundreds of Poles were carried out in January, March, June and August 1940. Among Poles arrested in March were 12 teachers and students of secret Polish schools. On 29 June 1940 the Germans carried out a massacre of 42 Poles from the prison in the Wolborski Forest in the northern part of the city. Among the victims were 14 students aged 17–18, eight reserve officers, and people of various professions, including pharmacists, an architect, railwayman, teacher, farmer and local secretary. 121 Poles from the local prison were deported to the Auschwitz, Gross-Rosen and Dachau concentration camps in June 1940. Many Poles, who were born or lived in the city, were murdered by the Russians in the large Katyń massacre in April–May 1940.

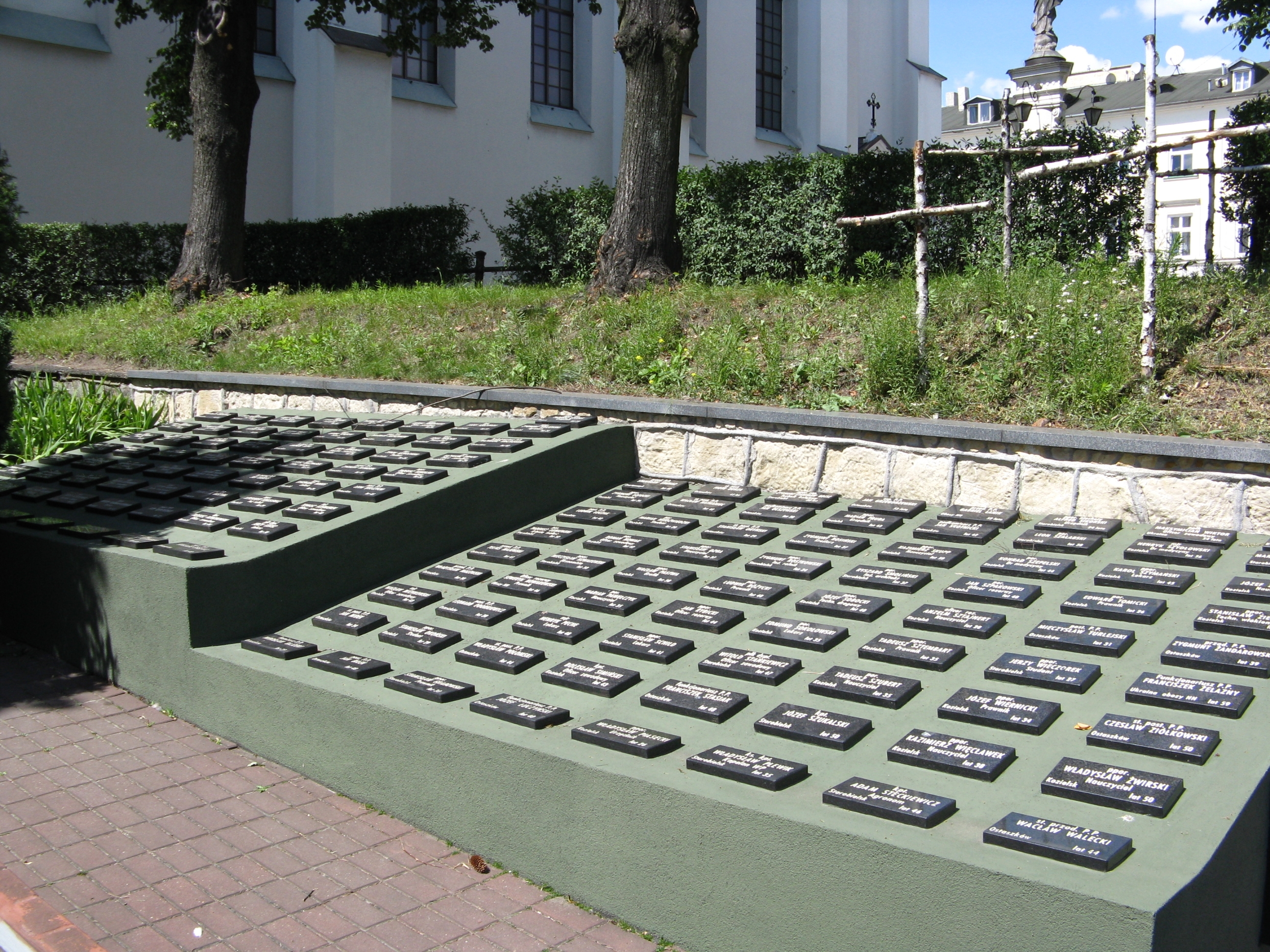
Memorial to the victims of the Katyń massacre

As early as October 1939 Piotrków became the site of the first Jewish ghetto of World War II set up in occupied Poland. Approximately 25,000 people from Piotrków and the nearby towns and villages were imprisoned there. During the Holocaust 22,000 were sent to the Treblinka extermination camp, while 3,000 were imprisoned in other Nazi concentration camps. A personal account of the Holocaust, In the Mouth of the Wolf details the escape of the author Rose Zar (née Rose Guterman) from the Piotrków Ghetto and hiding in plain sight, by working for the Wehrmacht and the SS. The secret Polish Council to Aid Jews "Żegota", established by the Polish resistance movement, operated in the city.

From the first months of the war, Piotrków was a center for underground resistance. From the spring of 1940, it was the seat of the district headquarters of the Armia Krajowa, or Home Army. In the summer of 1944, the 25th Infantry Regiment of the Home Army was formed in the district; it was the largest military unit of the Łódź Voivodeship, and fought against the Germans until November 1944. In the city and district, there were also other partisan groups: the Military Troops (connected with the Polish Socialist Party), People's Guard and People's Army (Polish Workers' Party), Peasants' Battalions (Polish People's Party), the National Military Organization and the National Armed Forces (National Party). In 1944, during the Warsaw Uprising, the Germans deported over 15,000 Varsovians from the Dulag 121 camp in Pruszków, where they were initially imprisoned, to Piotrków. Those Poles were mainly old people, ill people and women with children. After the fall of the uprising, the headquarters of the Polish Red Cross was temporarily located in the local Royal Castle from October 1944 to January 1945.

On 18 January 1945 the Soviet Red Army entered the city, dislodging the German troops. The city was restored to Poland, but with a Soviet-installed communist regime, which stayed in power until the Fall of Communism in 1989. Anti-communist partisans continued to fight in the vicinity in the following years.

=== Recent times ===
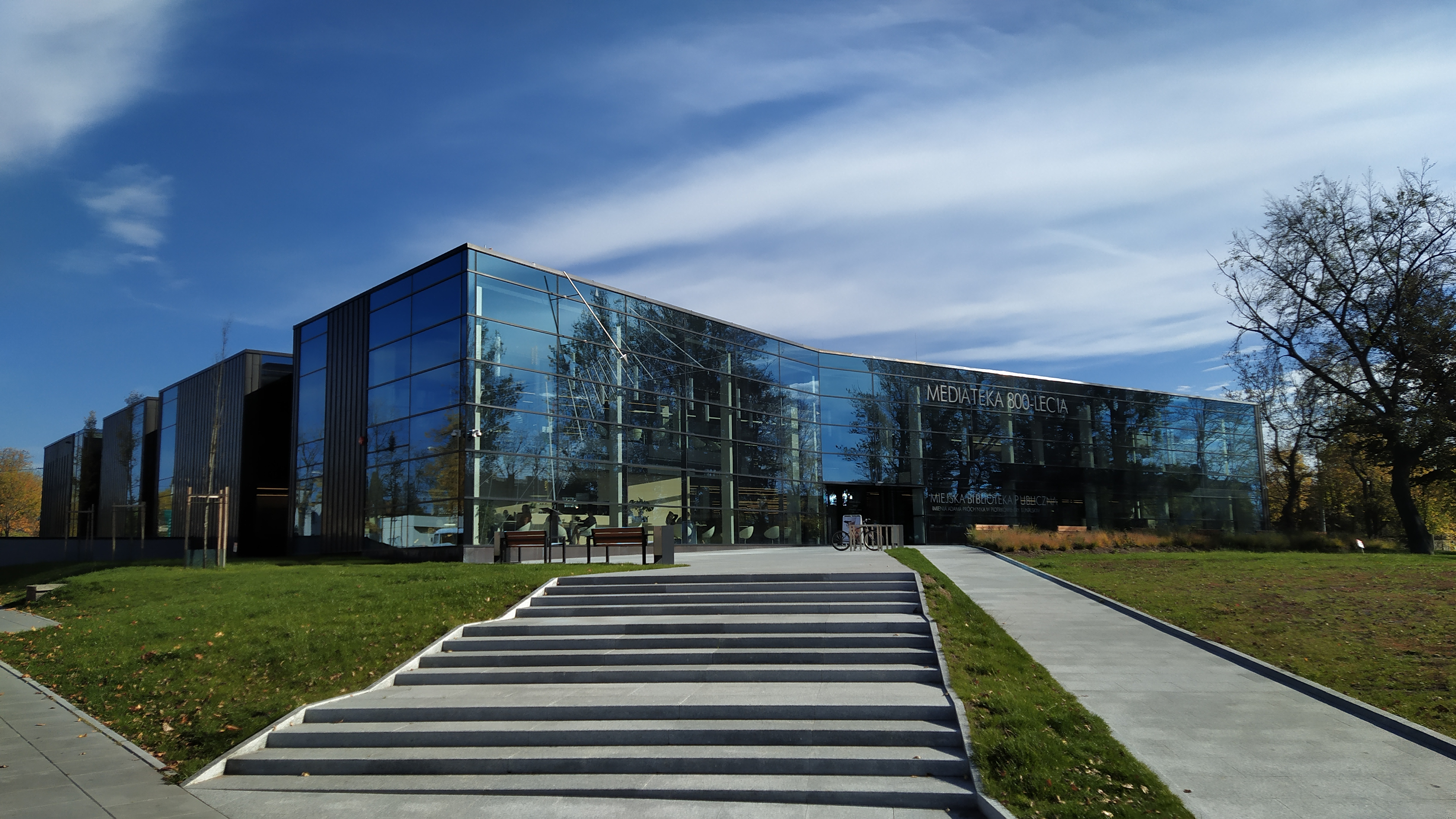
Adam Próchnik Municipal Library

From 1949 to 1970, Piotrków was transformed into an industrial center.

Piotrków remained a district capital in the Łódź Voivodeship, until 1975. Then, following the changes in the administrative division of the country, the city became the capital of the new Piotrków Voivodeship, thus regaining the status of an important administrative, educational and cultural center of Poland. In 1999, the Piotrków Voivodeship was dissolved and Piotrków became the capital of Piotrków County within the Łódź Voivodeship.

== Economy ==
Piotrków, thanks to its location, is known as the second largest "logistic center" after Warsaw. There is a high concentration of warehouses and distribution centers around the city. The biggest distribution centers are:

- Prologis Park Piotrkow I and Prologis Park Piotrkow II owned by ProLogis
- IKEA Distribution Center owned by IKEA
- Logistic City – Piotrków Distribution Center owned by local concern Emerson
- Poland Central

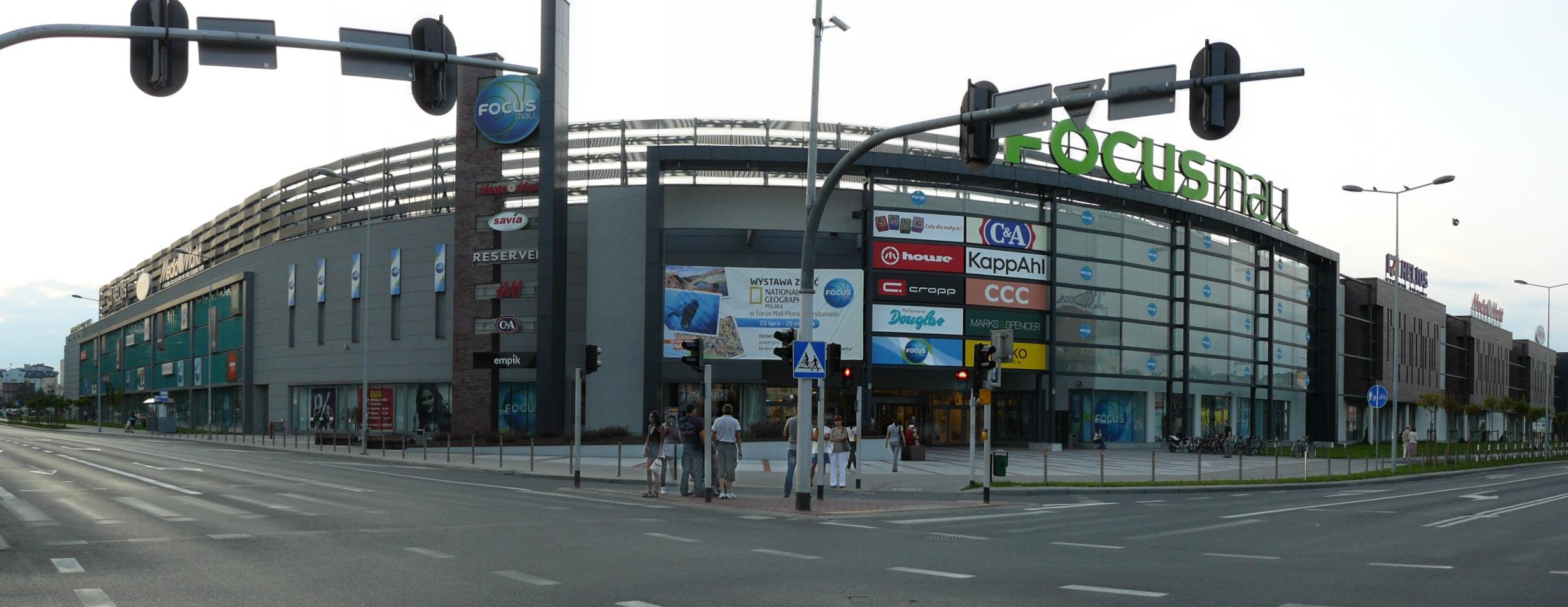
Focus Mall shopping center.

In Piotrków are also located:

- Emerson Polska – self-copying computer paper
- Häring – facility producing fuel injection equipment (for Mercedes-Benz, Bosch, Volkswagen)
- Metzeler Automotive Profile Systems – car profiles
- Kiper brewery
- FMG Pioma S.A. – mining machinery, conveyor belts
- Sigmatex Sp. z o.o. – knitted fabrics

and many small and medium textile processing factories.

== Transport ==
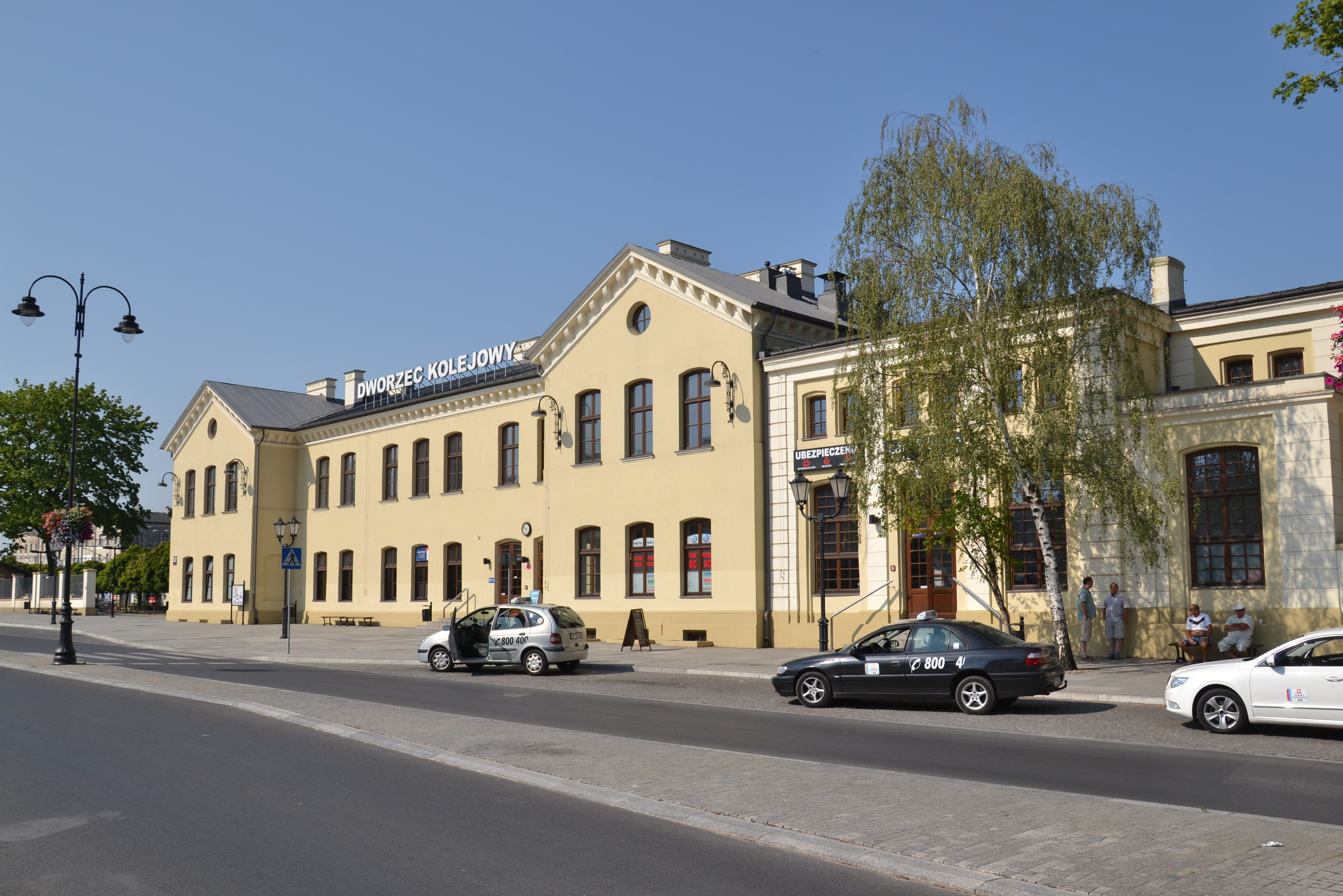
Main train station

Piotrków lies almost in the center of Poland. It has a train station on the PKP rail line 1 from Warsaw to Częstochowa. Direct trains go among others to Kraków, Zakopane, Katowice, Bielsko-Biała, Wrocław, Łódź, Poznań, Szczecin, Świnoujście, Gdynia, Olsztyn and Białystok.

=== Roads ===
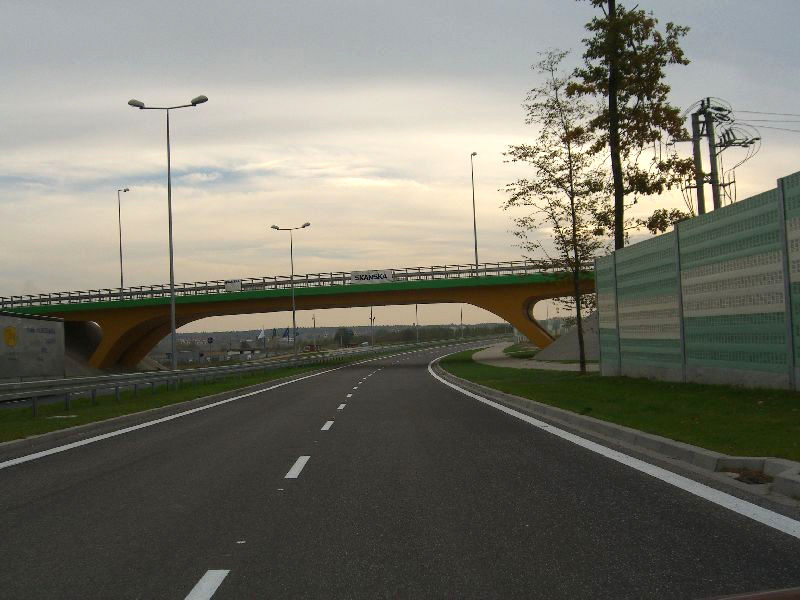
Eastern bypass

A highway, an expressway and three national roads cross Piotrków:

- A 1 Gdańsk – Gorzyczki, part of European route E75
- S 8 Kudowa-Zdrój – Budzisko, part of European route E67
- DK 12 Łęknica – Dorohusk, eventually to be upgraded to the S12 expressway
- DK 74 Wieluń – Zosin
- DK 91 Gdańsk – Podwarpie

=== Airports ===
There is a small airfield for light passenger aircraft in Piotrków. The nearest airport is Łódź Władysław Reymont Airport in Łódź. Two large international airports are Warsaw Frédéric Chopin Airport about 133 km (83 mi) from Piotrków and Katowice International Airport about 137 km (85 mi) from Piotrków.

== Educational institutions ==
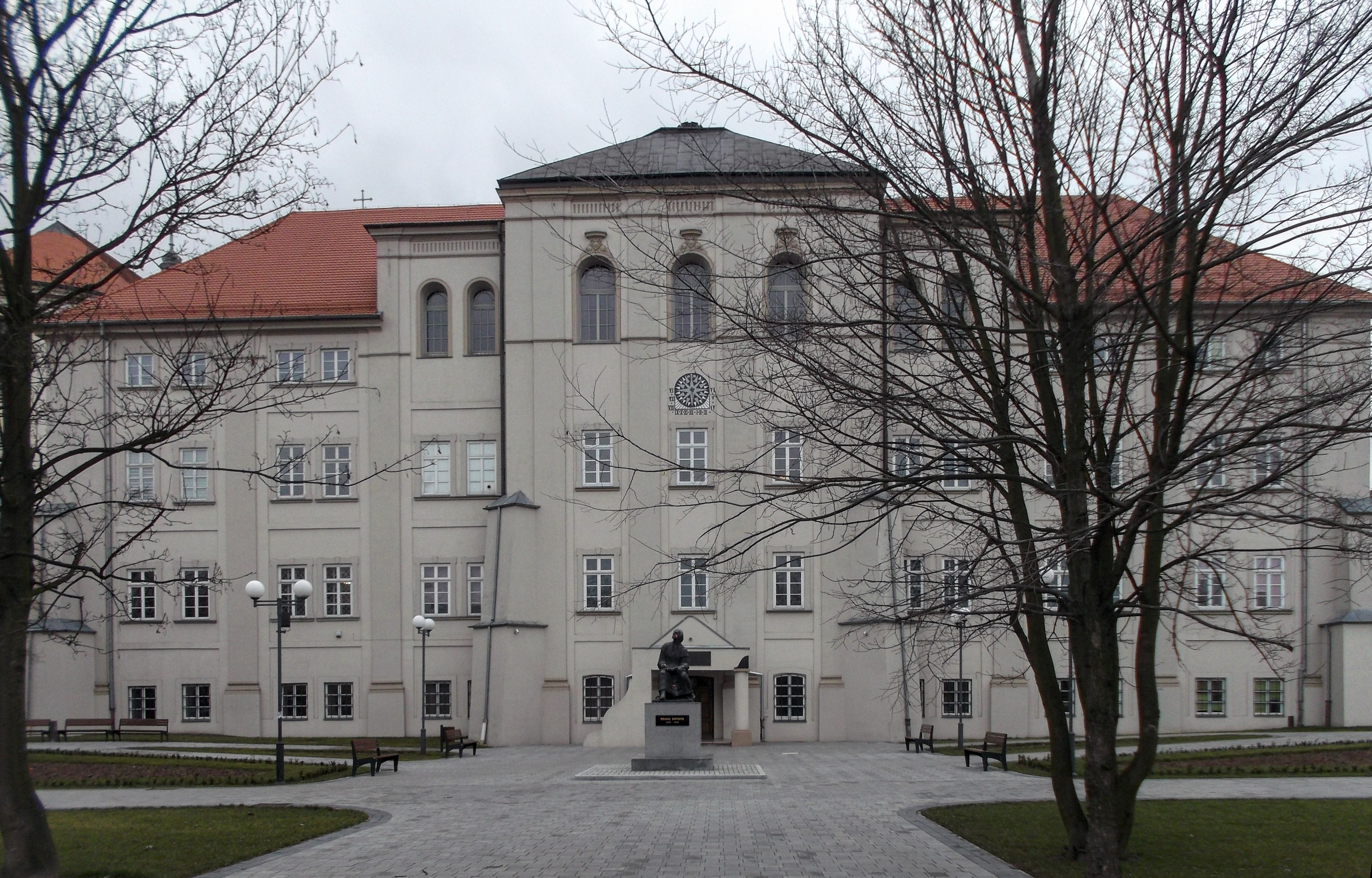
Bolesław I the Brave High School, founded in 1675

- Wyższa Szkoła Handlowa in Piotrków Trybunalski
- Wyższa Szkoła Kupiecka in Łódź, branch in Piotrków
- Jan Kochanowski University in Kielce, branch in Piotrków
- Bolesław I the Brave High School in Piotrków Trybunalski

== Politics ==
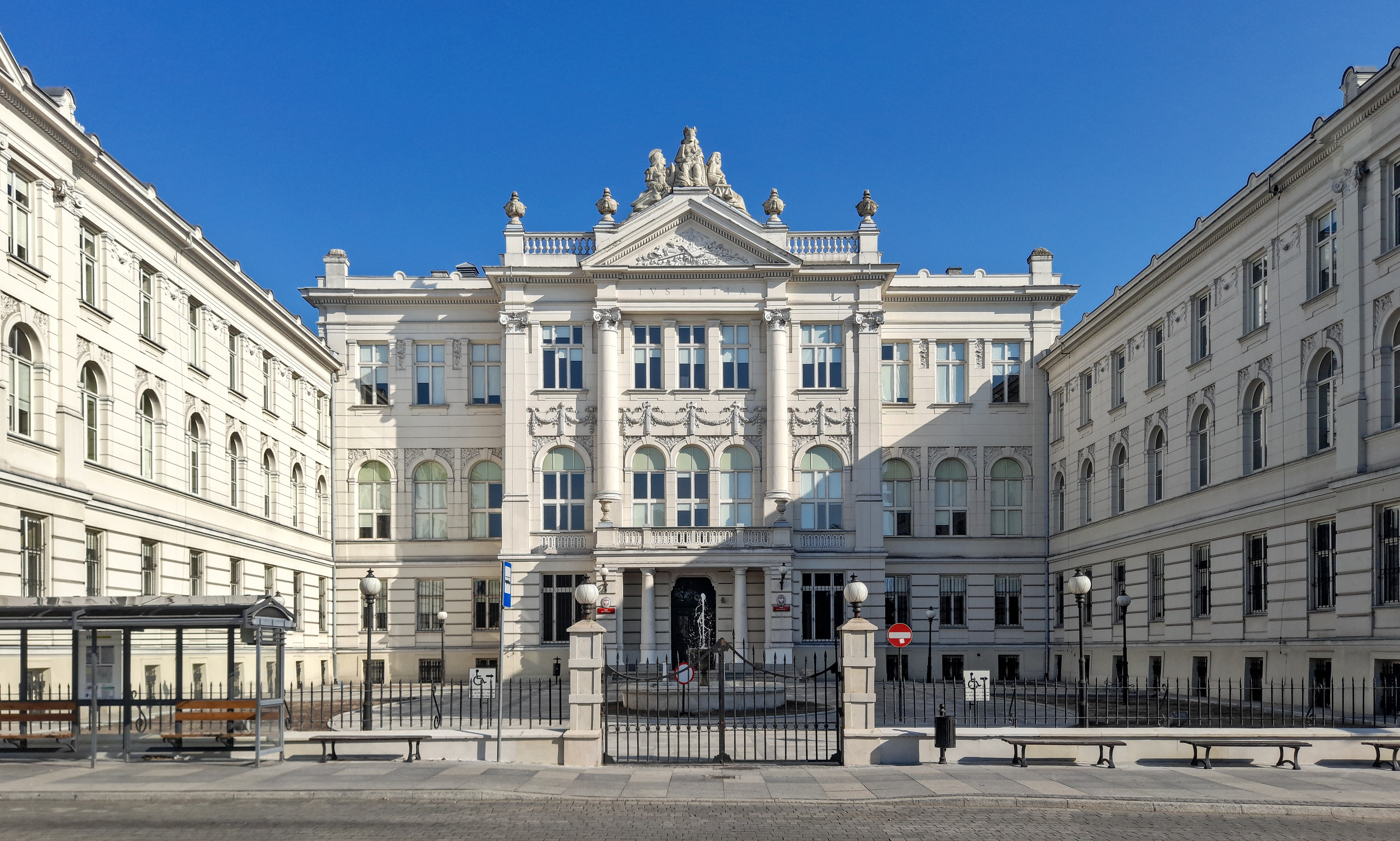
High Court of Piotrków

=== Piotrków Trybunalski/Skierniewice constituency ===
Members of Parliament (Sejm) elected by the Piotrków/Skierniewice constituency

- Antoni Macierewicz, Law and Justice
- Dariusz Seliga, Law and Justice
- Marcin Witko, Law and Justice
- Robert Telus, Law and Justice
- Elżbieta Radziszewska, Civic Platform
- Dorota Rutkowska, Civic Platform
- Marek Domaracki, TR
- Krystyna Ozga, PSL
- Artur Ostrowski, SLD

== Sports ==
- Piotrcovia Piotrków Trybunalski – women's and men's handball team playing in the Polish Ekstraklasa Women's Handball League and the Polish Ekstraklasa Men's Handball League
- Concordia Piotrków Trybunalski – men's football team playing in the lower leagues.

== Notable people ==
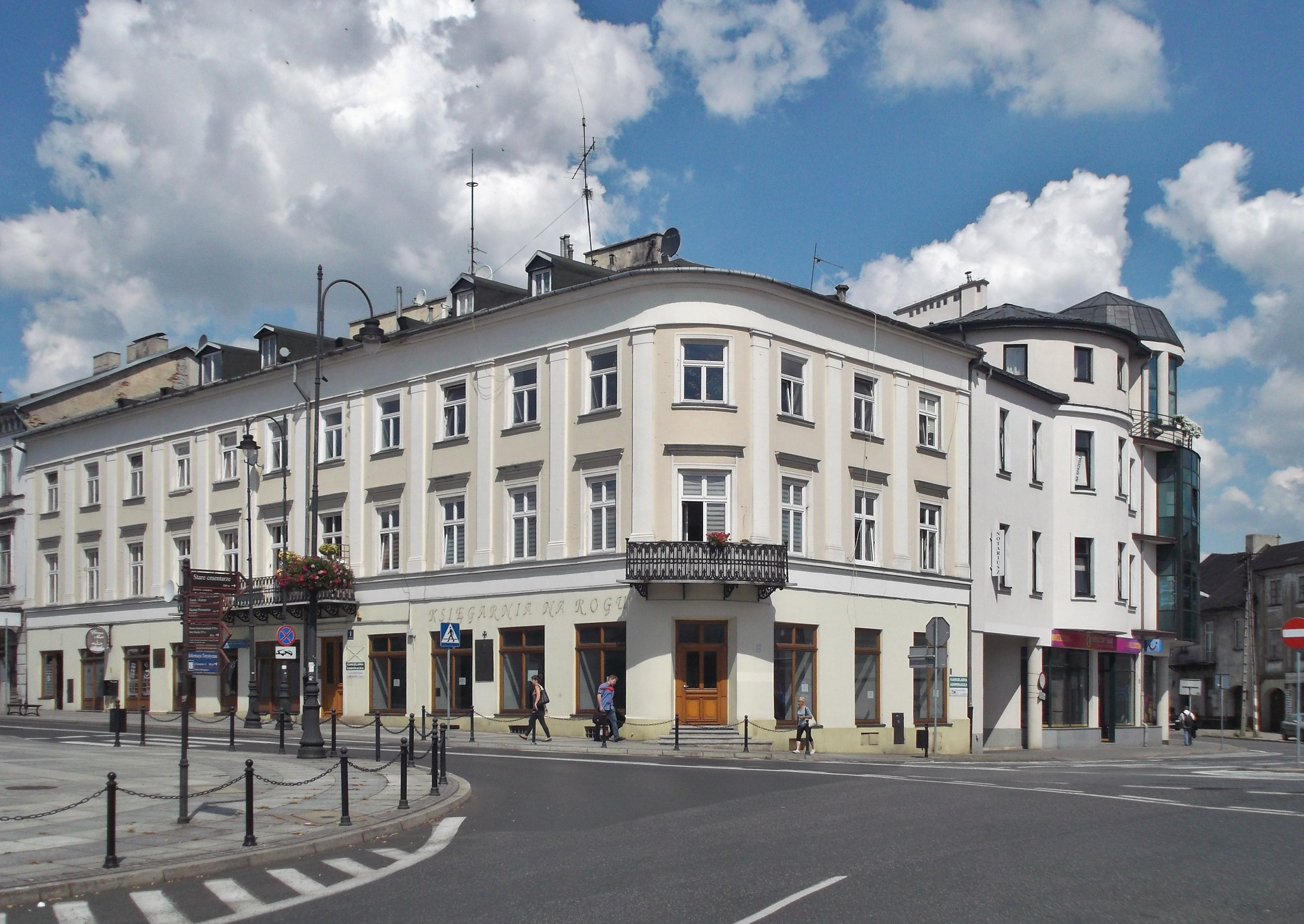
Birthplace and childhood home of Stefan Rowecki

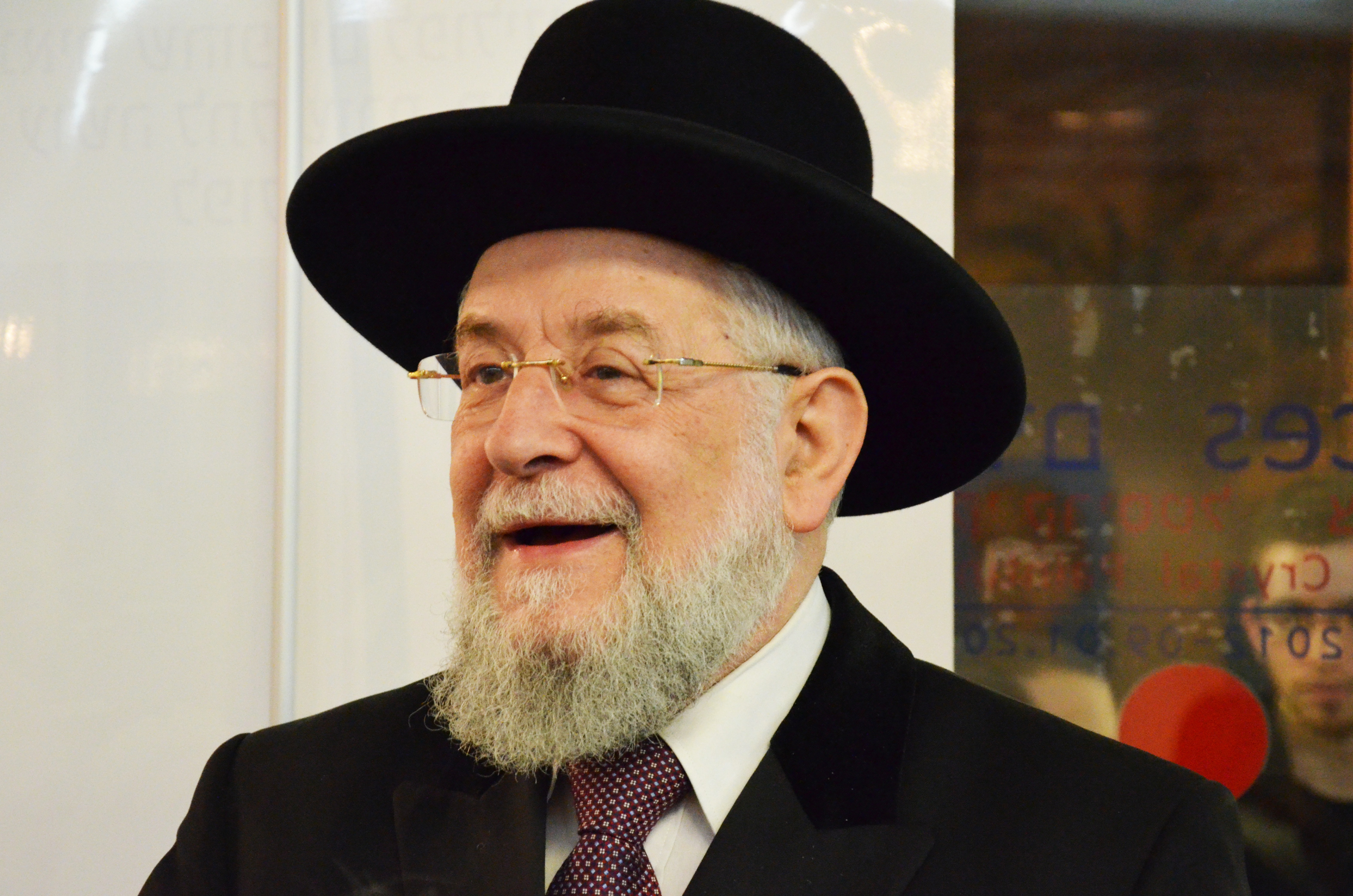
Yisrael Meir Lau, the Chief Rabbi of Israel, was born in Piotrków

- Michał Bąkiewicz (born 1981), volleyball player and coach
- Władysław Biegański (1857–1917), medical doctor, philosopher, and social activist
- Moshe Bromberg (1920–1982), Polish-Jewish painter
- Wioletta Frankiewicz (born 1977), runner
- Maciej Ganczar (born 1976), literary scholar specializing in German literature, literary translator
- Michael Heilprin (1823–1888), Polish-American Jewish biblical scholar, critic, and writer
- Ben Helfgott (born 1929), Polish-born British Jewish Olympic weightlifter
- Michał Jonczyk (born 1992), footballer
- Yisrael Meir Lau (born 1937), Chief Rabbi of Tel Aviv, chairman of Yad Vashem, Ashkenazi Chief Rabbi of Israel
- Naphtali Lau-Lavie (1926–2014), Israeli journalist, author, and diplomat
- Grigory Levenfish (1889–1961), chess player
- Kamil Majchrzak (born 1996) professional tennis player
- John Michael Małek (1928–2022), Polish-American, born in Piotrków Trybunalski
- Alice Miller (1923–2010), Polish-Swiss psychologist
- Adam Muszka (1914–2005), Polish-French painter and sculptor
- Michał Rawita-Witanowski (1858–1943), Polish historian and pharmacist, founder of the local museum
- Ernestine Rose (1810–1892), feminist writer and human rights activist
- Stefan Rowecki (1895–1944), general and journalist
- Irena Sendler (1910–2008), humanitarian and nurse of the Polish resistance movement in World War II, head of the children's section of the Żegota, who rescued 2,500 Jewish children during the Holocaust, lived in Piotrków in the 1920s
- Wojciech Szala (born 1976), footballer
- Adam Szymczyk (born 1970), art critic and curator
- Mala Tribich (born 1930), Holocaust survivor and educational speaker
- Mariusz Trynkiewicz (born 1962), serial killer
- Chaim Elozor Wax (1822–1887), famous rabbi
- Thaddeus Wronski (1887–1965), Polish-American opera singer and conductor, founder and director of the Detroit Civic Light Opera
- Sabina Zimering (1923–2021), Polish-American ophthalmologist and memoirist

== International relations ==
=== Twin towns – sister cities ===
Piotrków Trybunalski is twinned with:

| – Esslingen am Neckar, Germany (1992); – Maladziečna, Belarus (1996); – Rivne, Ukraine (1997); – Velenje, Slovenia (1998) | – Mosonmagyaróvár, Hungary (2001); – Marijampolė, Lithuania (2002); – Vienne, Isère, France (2005); – Neath Port Talbot, Wales (2007); – Ness Ziona, Israel (2016) |

Piotrków Trybunalski is also partnered with:

- – Udine, Italy
- – Schiedam, Netherlands

== Image gallery ==
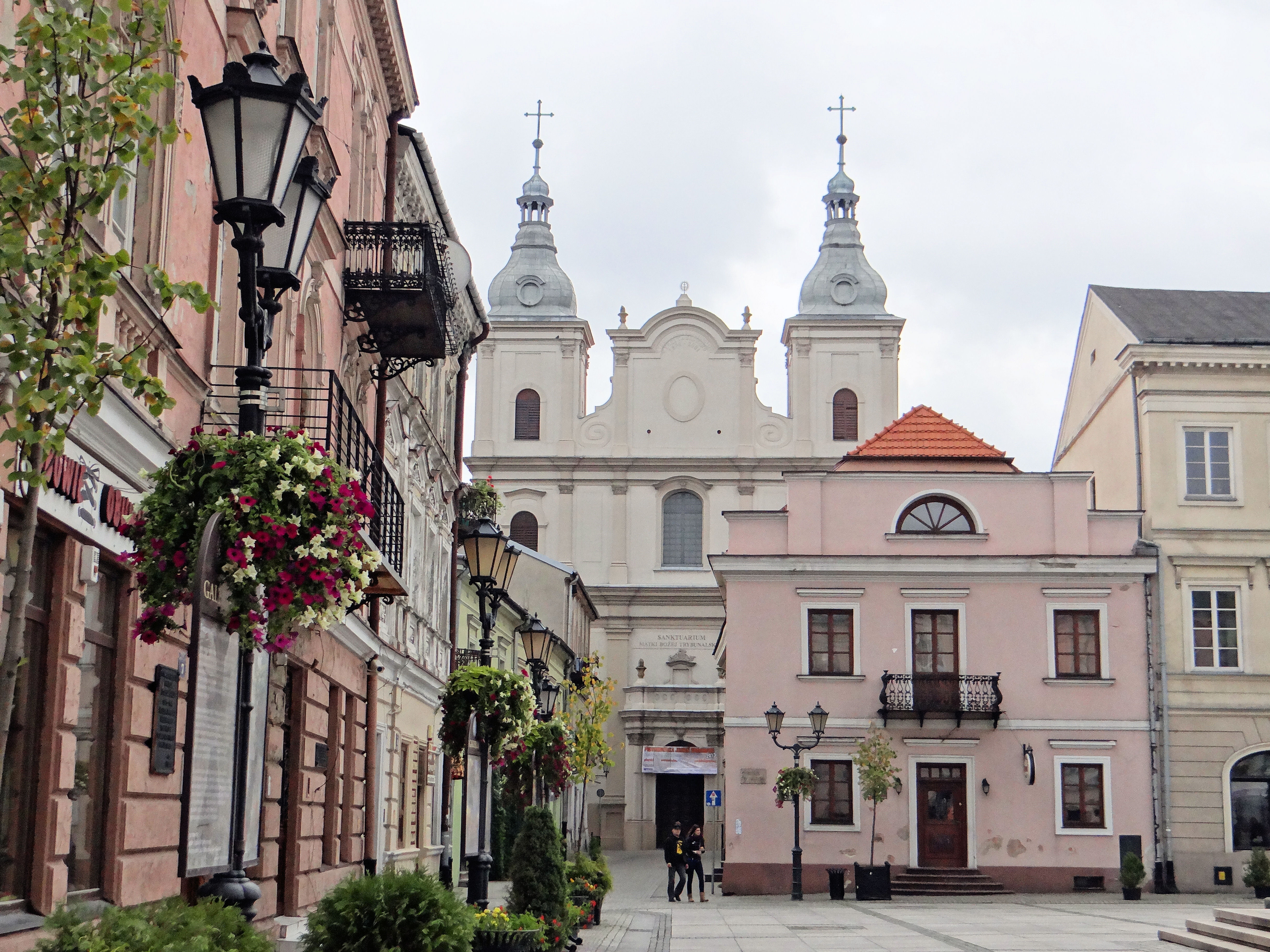
Baroque Jesuit Church

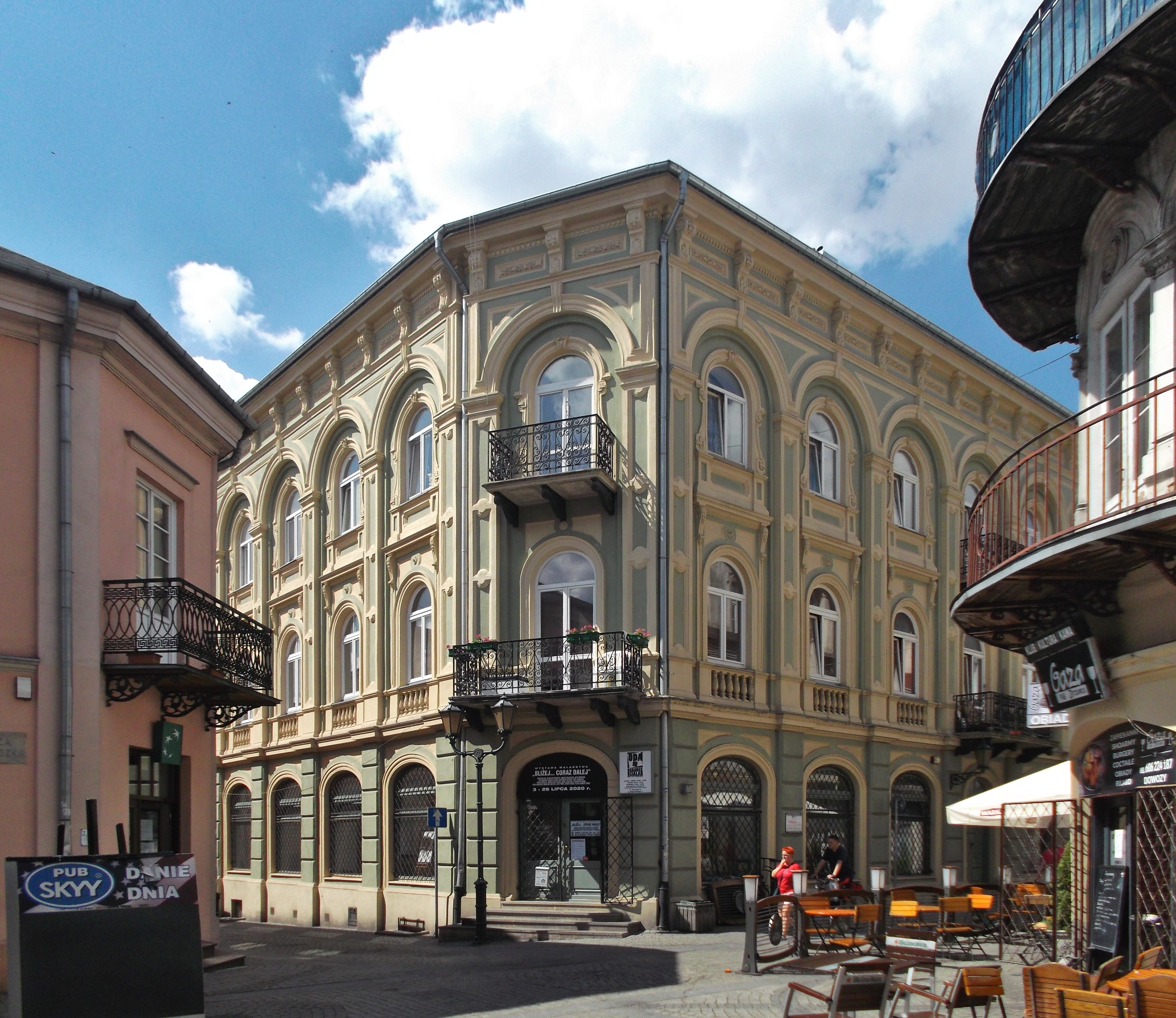
Inside the Old Town

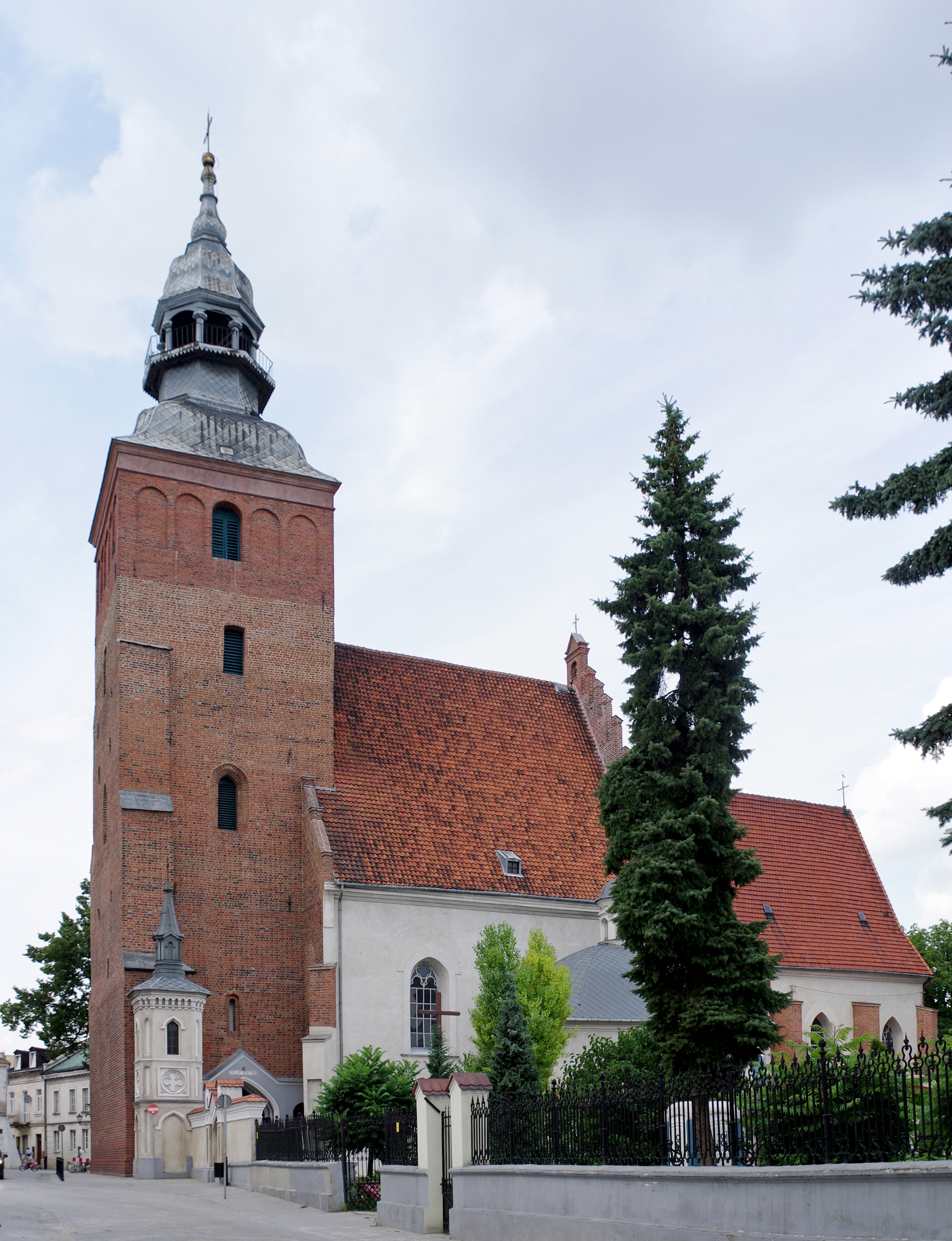
St. James Parish Church

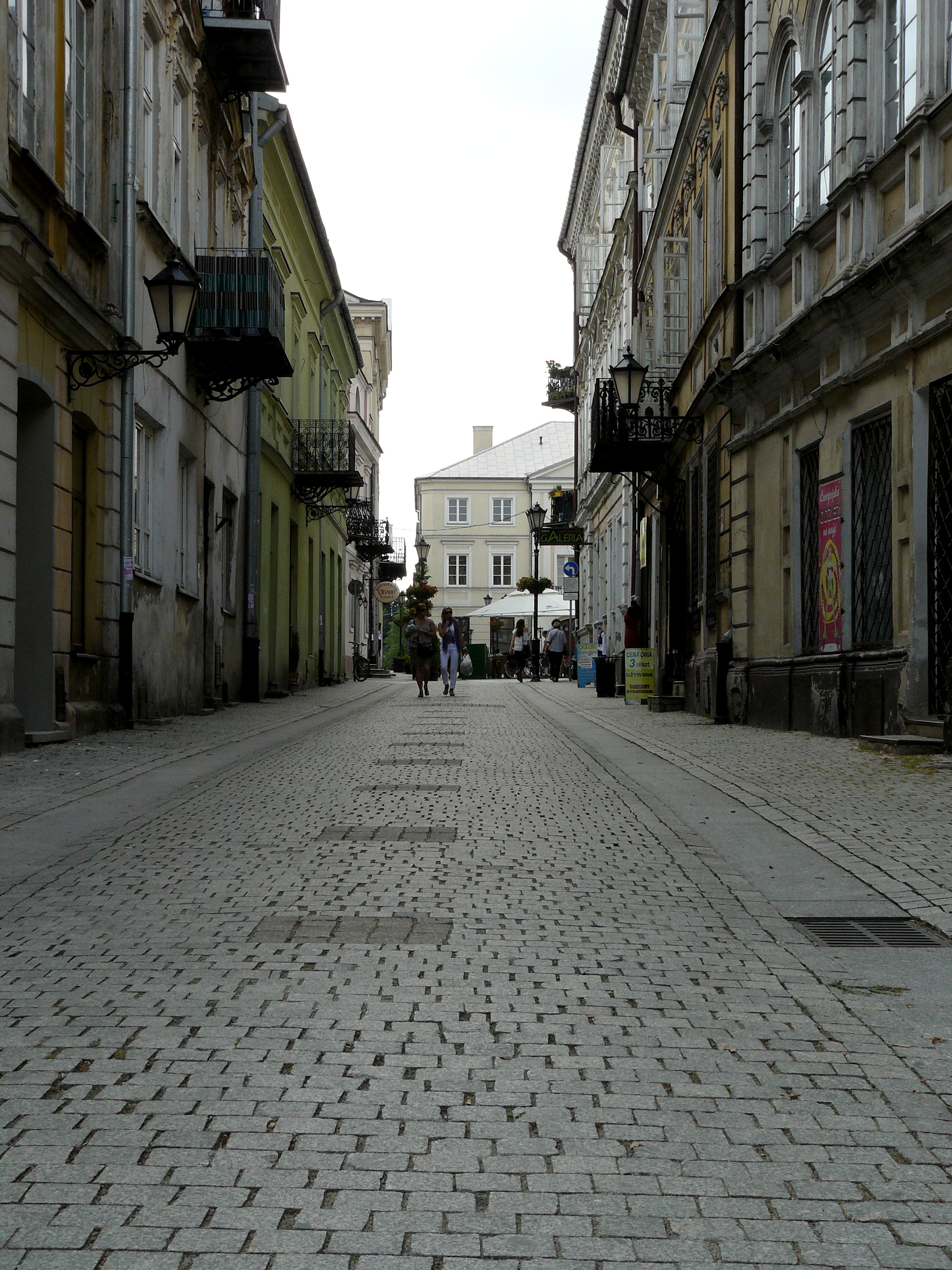
Grodzka street near the Market Square

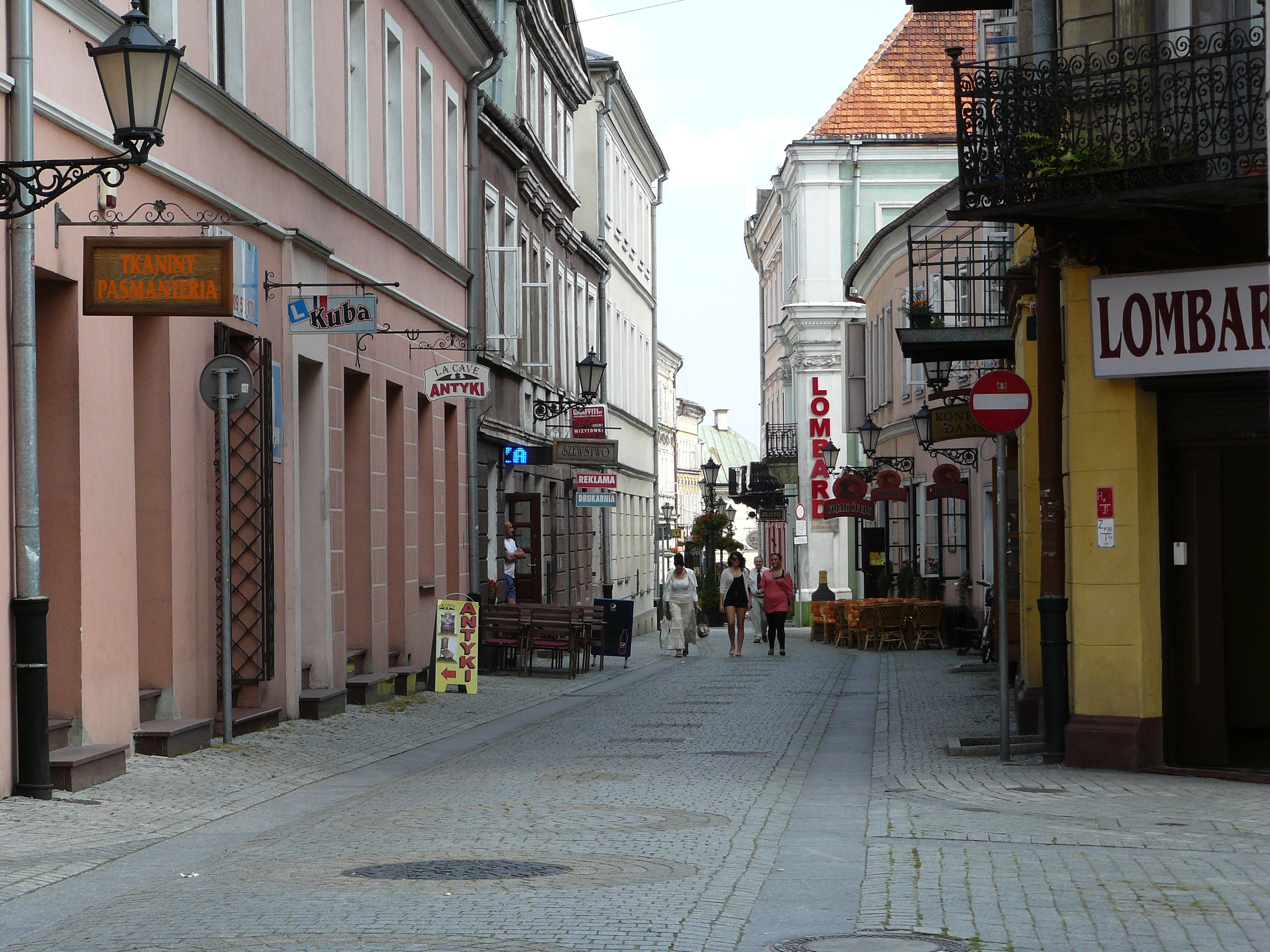
Szewska street in the Old Town

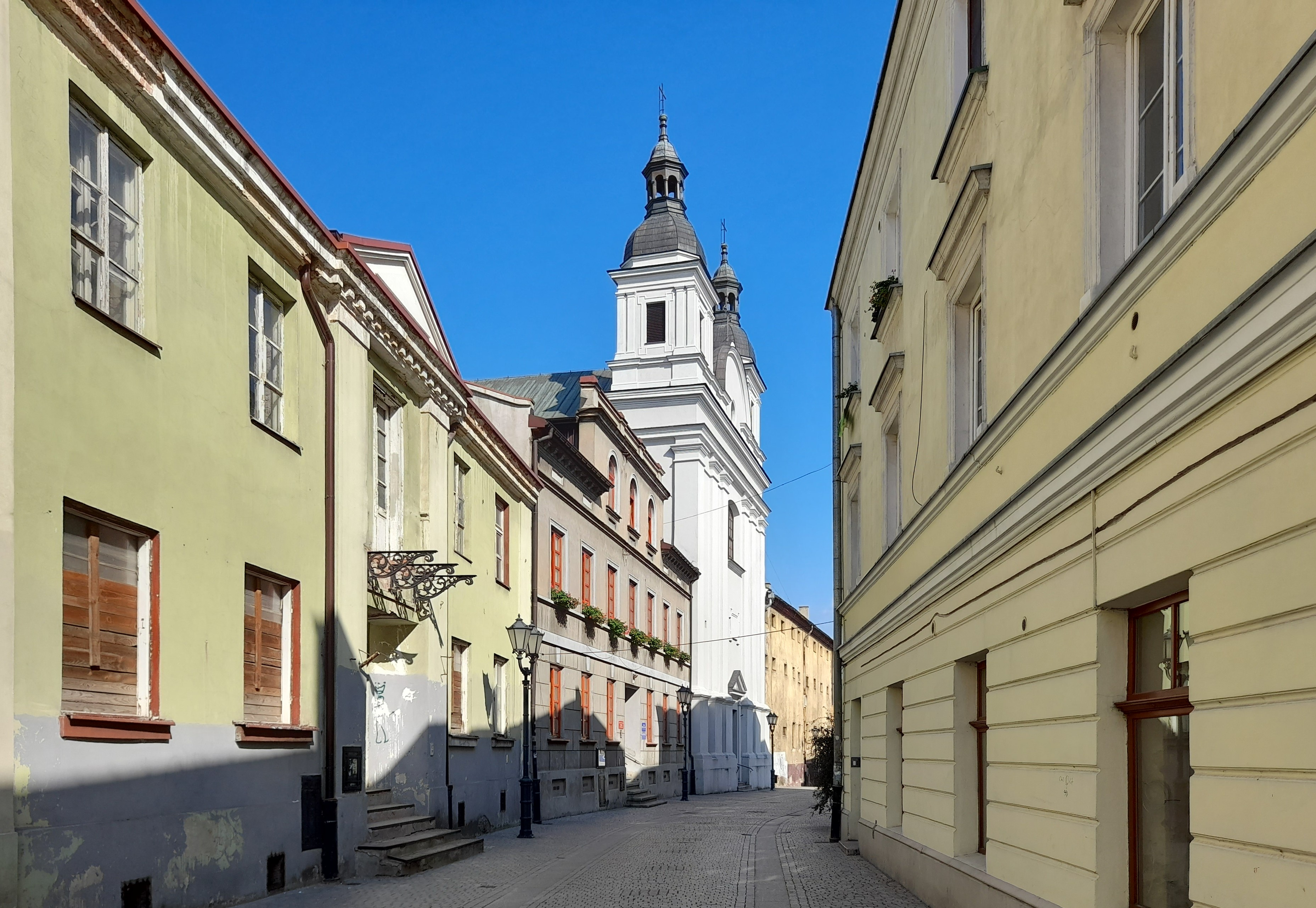
Rwańska Street in the Old Town with the Evangelical Church

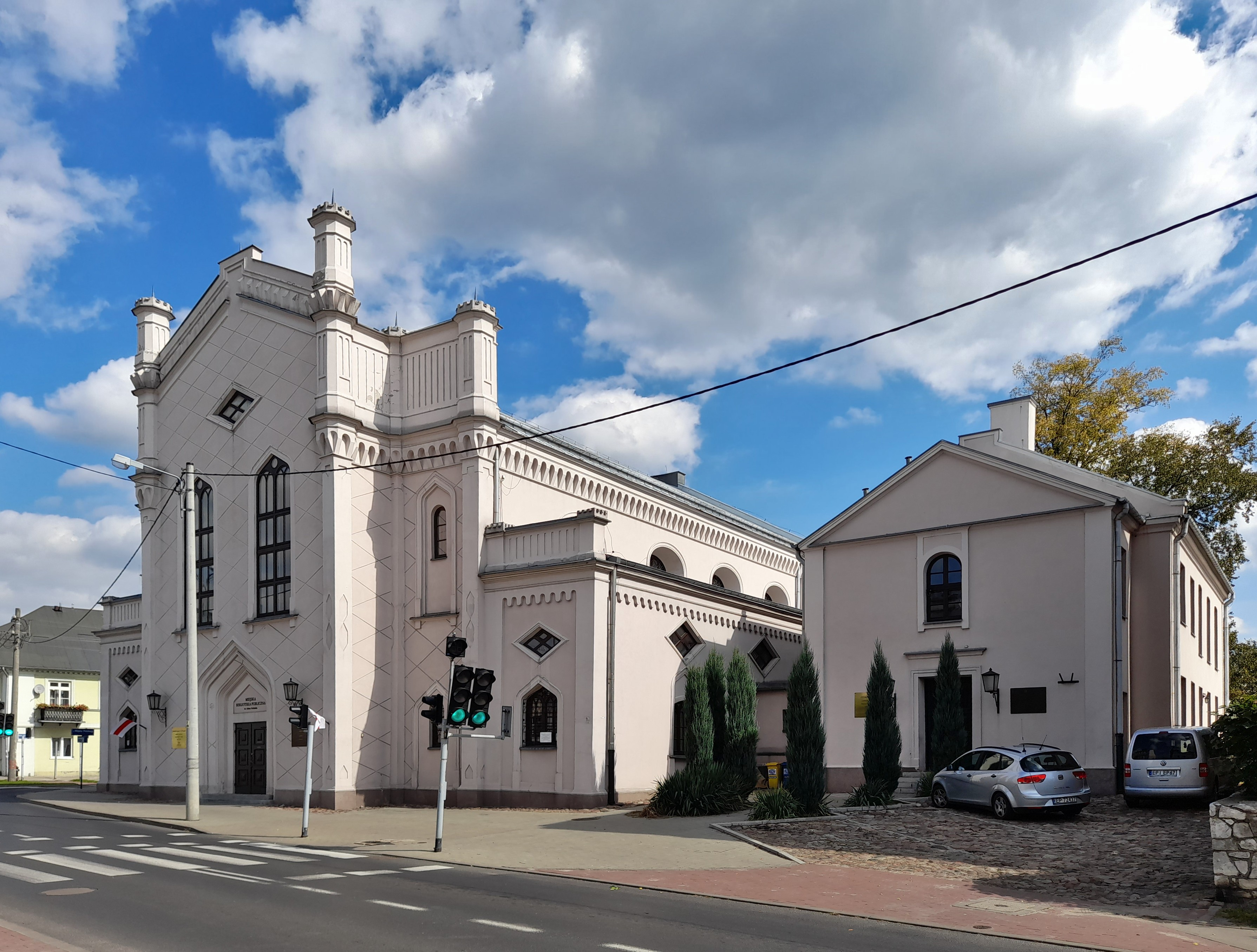
Great Synagogue

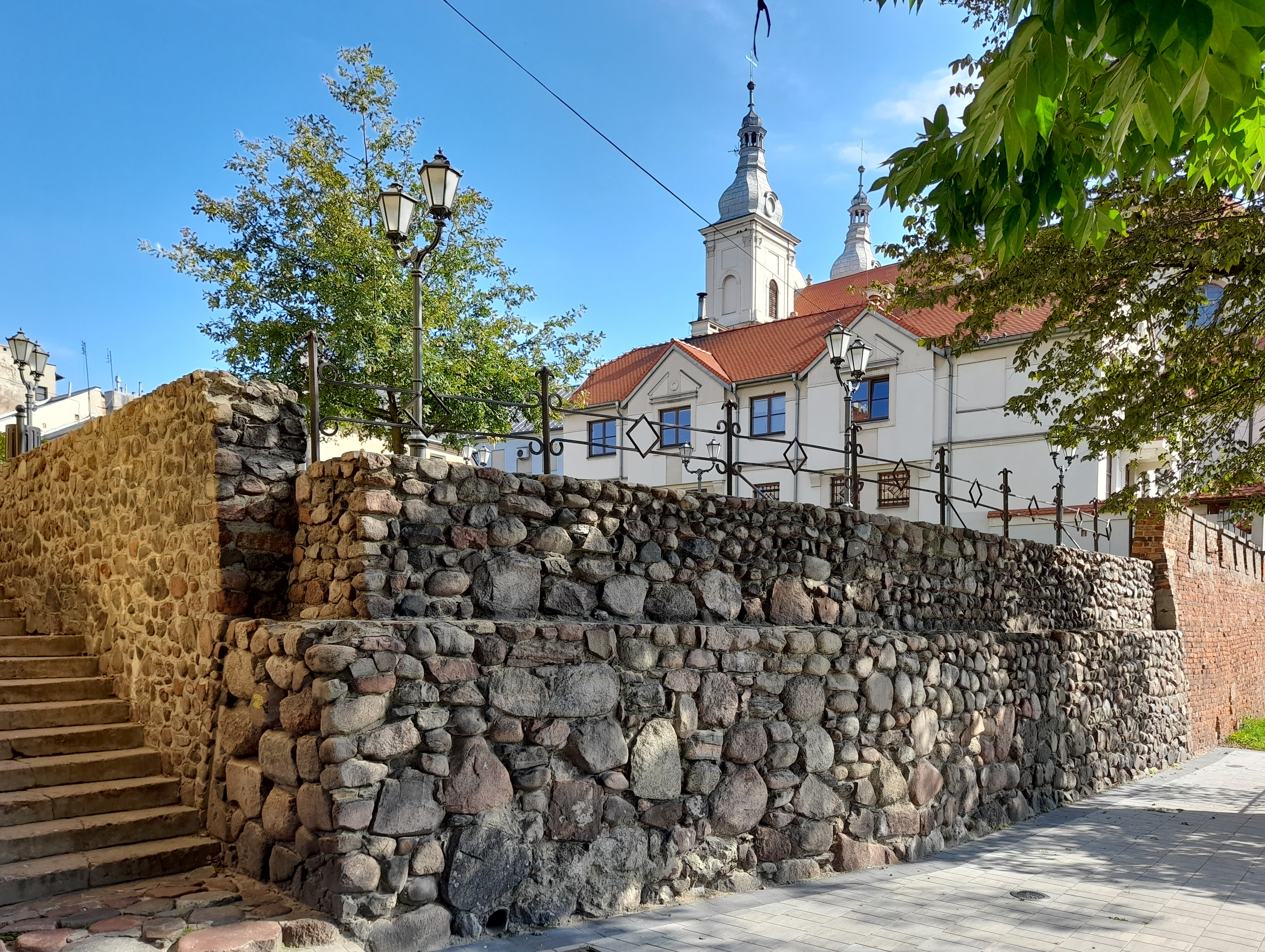
Remaining old city walls

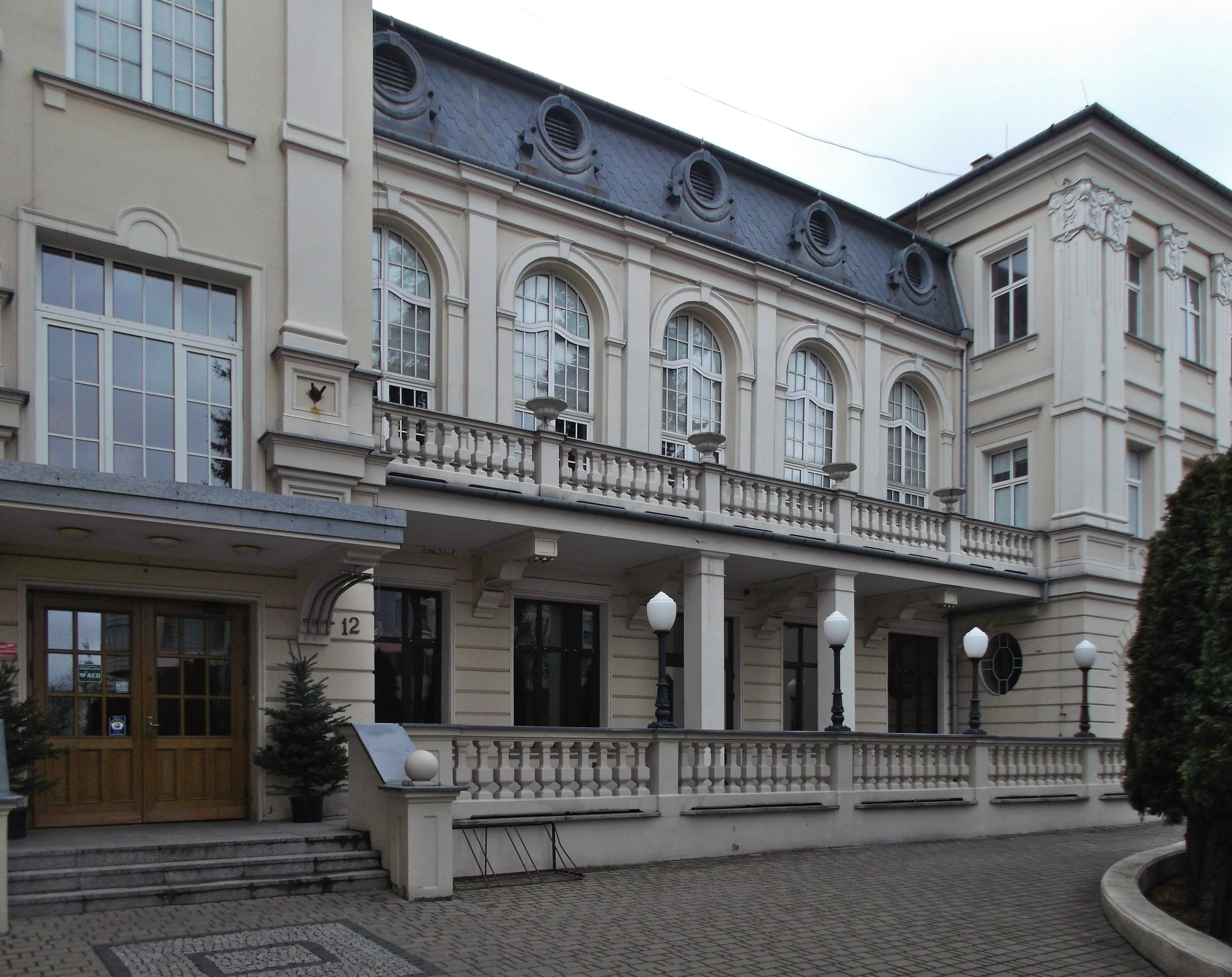
Municipal Culture Center

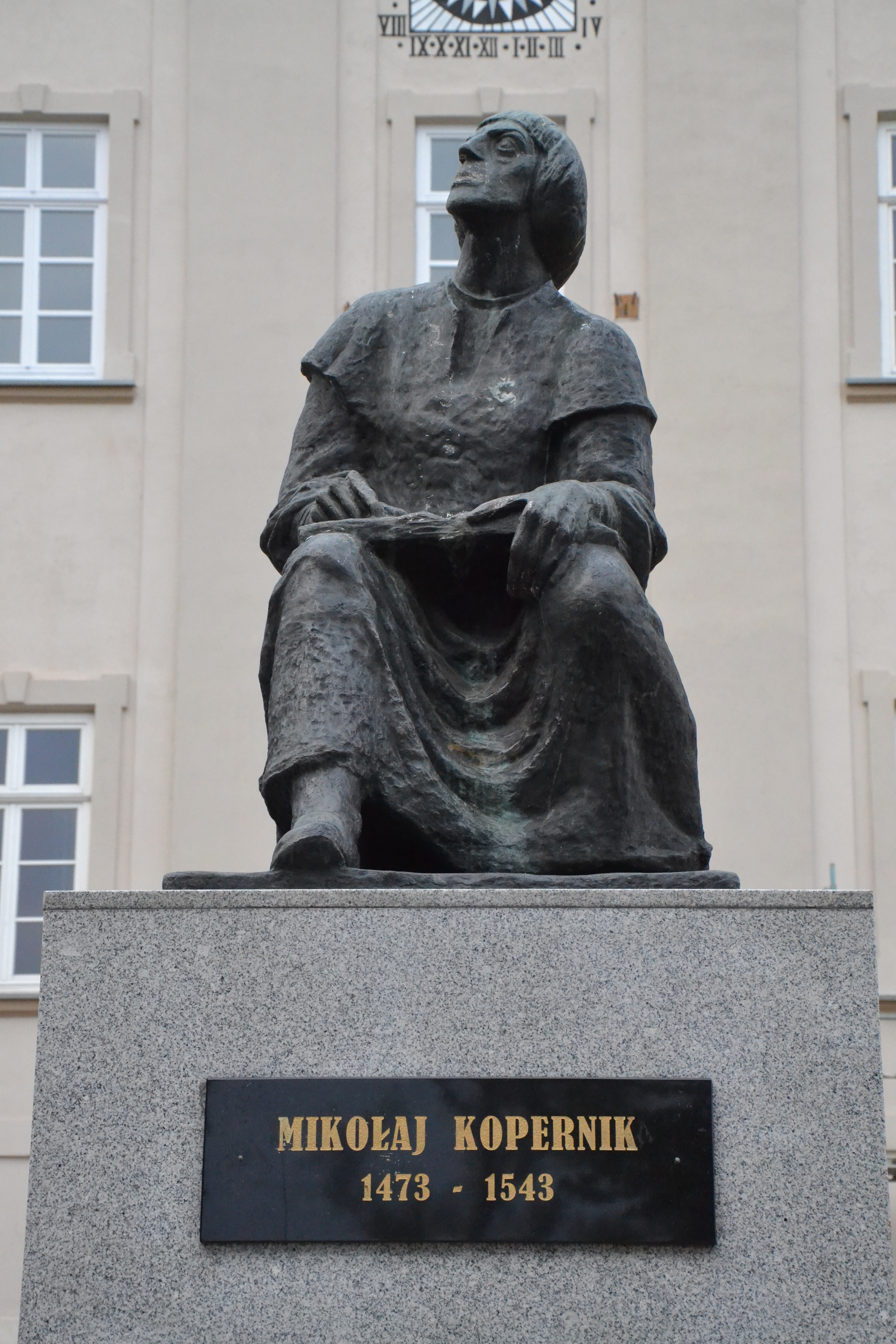
Nicolaus Copernicus Monument

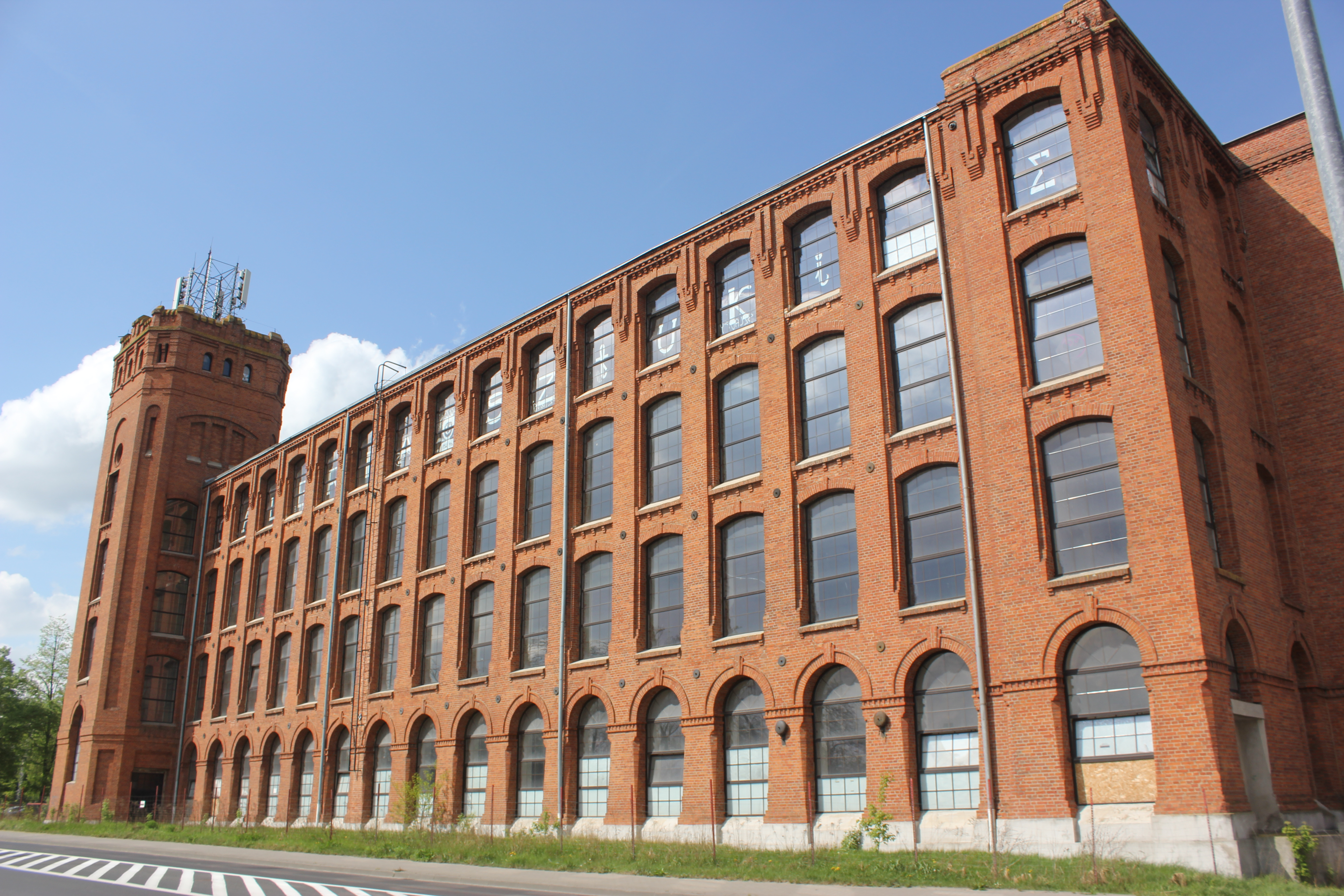
Piotrkowska Manufaktura, a former textile factory

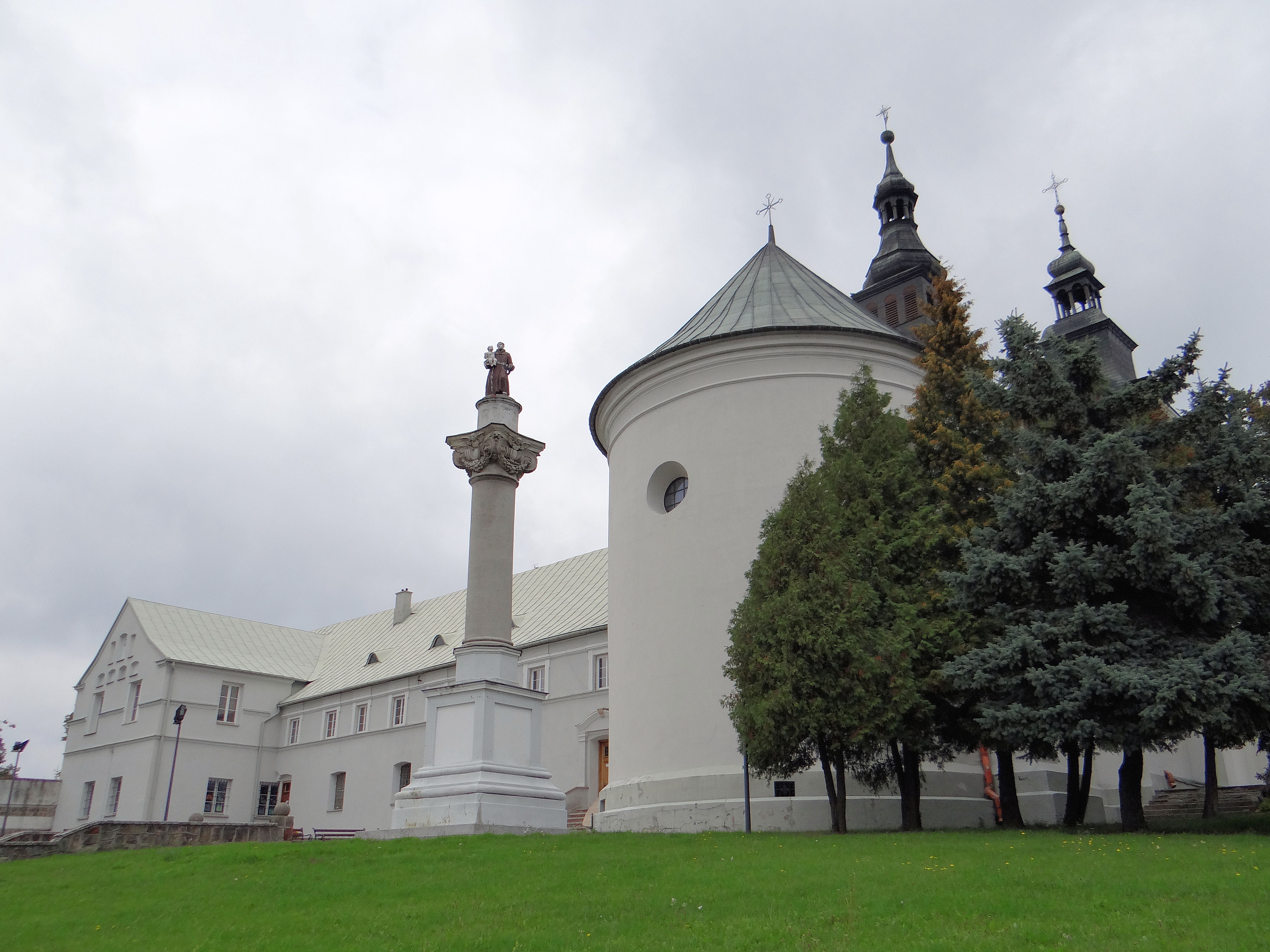
Bernardine Monastery
