= Great Synagogue (Piotrków Trybunalski) =

Destroyed synagogue in Piotrków Trybunalski, Poland

- Polish: Wielka Synagoga w Piotrkowie Trybunalskim
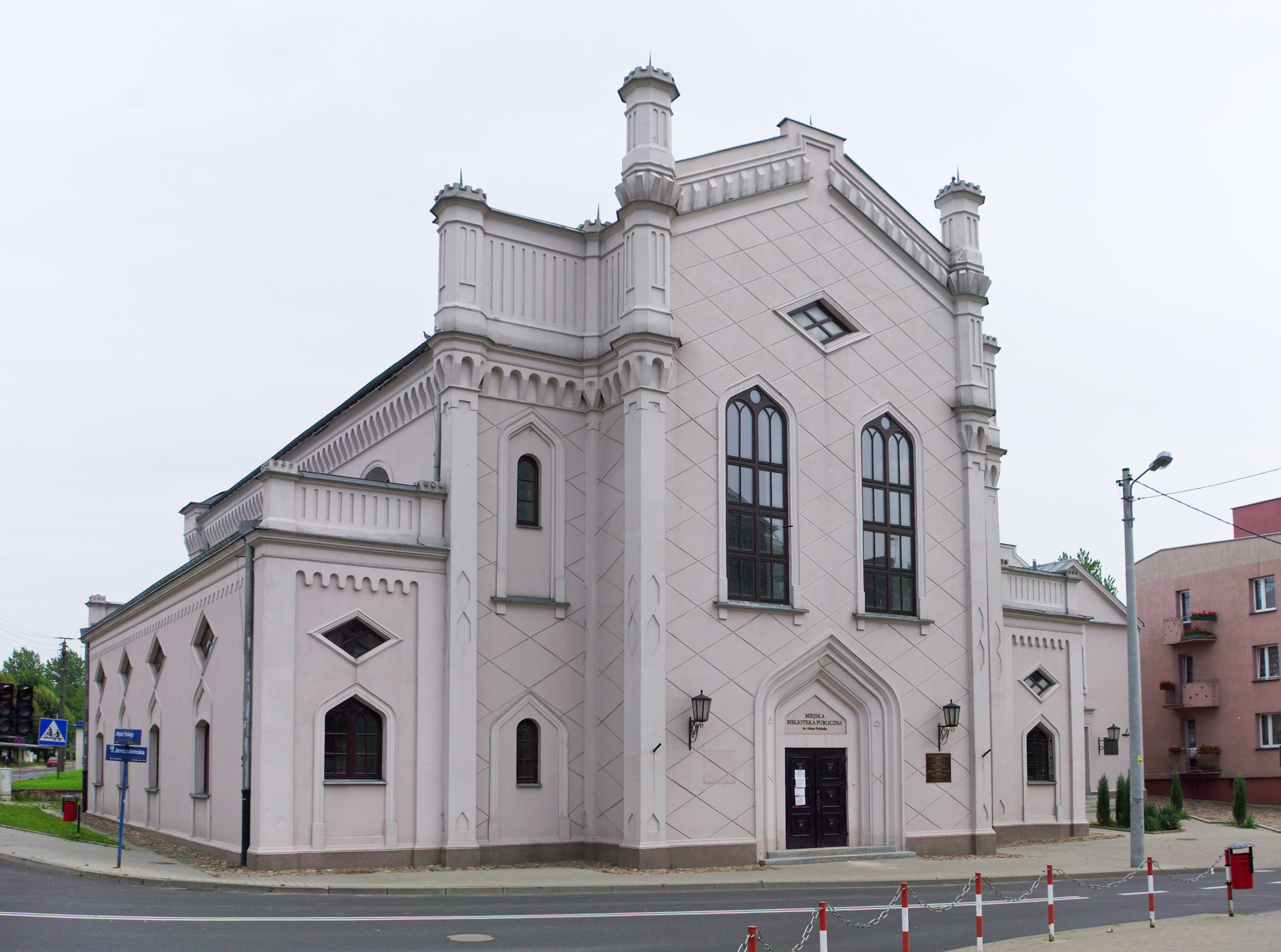
- The former synagogue in 2014, restored

- Location of the destroyed synagogue in Łódź Voivodeship

Religion
- Affiliation: Orthodox Judaism (former)
- Rite: Nusach Ashkenaz
- Ecclesiastical or organisational status: Synagogue (1793–1939); Library (since )
- Status: Inactive (as a synagogue); Repurposed

Location
- Location: 29 Jerozolimska Street, Piotrków Trybunalski, Łódź Voivodeship
- Country: Poland
- Coordinates: 51°24′34″N 19°42′06″E

Architecture
- Architect: David Friedlander
- Type: Synagogue architecture
- Style: Romanesque Revival
- Funded by: Moses Kocyn Foundation
- Groundbreaking: 1791
- Completed: 1793
- Materials: Brick

The Great Synagogue (Polish: Wielka Synagoga w Piotrkowie Trybunalskim) was a former Orthodox Jewish congregation and synagogue, located at 29 Jerizilimska Street, in Piotrków Trybunalski, in the Łódź Voivodeship of Poland. Designed by David Friedlander and completed in 1793, the synagogue served as a house of prayer until World War II when it was desecrated by Nazis.

After the war, the building was renovated and repurposed as a county library. Although plundered during World War II, the building is the best preserved synagogue in the Łódź region and one of the best preserved in Poland.

== History ==
Kazimierz Stronczynski who in 1844-55 led the first official inventory of important buildings in Poland, titled A General View of the Nature of Ancient Monuments in the Kingdom of Poland, described the Great Synagogue of Piotrków as one of Poland's architecturally notable buildings.

On the front wall there is a commemorative plaque in Polish, Hebrew, Yiddish, and English, that reads:

"This building, once 'The Great Synagogue,' and this plaque, sanctify the memory of Piotrkow Jews murdered by the Nazis during 1939 - 1945.
Remembrance and restoration project in memory of the Holocaust martyrs and the departed of our Jewish community and in memory of the Great Tzadik Rabbi Dr. Hayim David Bernard."

In 2012 the synagogue was restored. The façade was repainted according to its original appearance before World War II.

== See also ==
- History of the Jews in Poland
- List of active synagogues in Poland
