= Seal of Lithuania =

Seal of Lithuania may refer to:

- Great Seal of Lithuania, a national seal of the Grand Duchy of Lithuania, which was historically possessed by the Grand Chancellor of Lithuania until 1795
- Lesser Seal of Lithuania, a national seal of the Grand Duchy of Lithuania, which was historically possessed by the Vice-Chancellor of Lithuania until 1795
