= Cap of Gediminas =

Royal regalia of the Grand Duchy of Lithuania

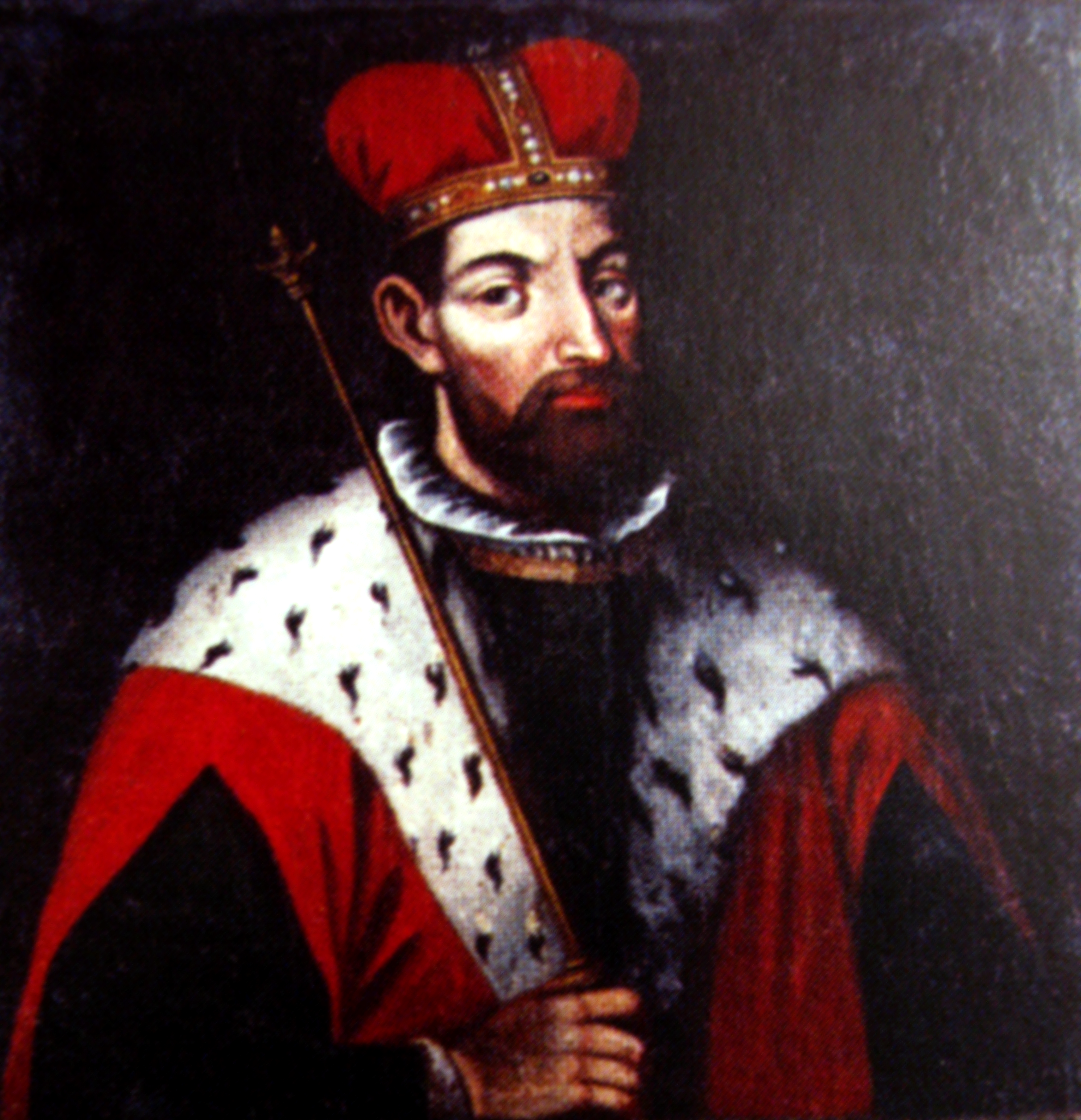
Gediminas wearing the Cap, painted in 1709

The Cap of Gediminas (Lithuanian: Gedimino kepurė) was a ceremonial headdress and one of the principal insignia of the Grand Dukes of Lithuania. It was traditionally associated with Grand Duke Gediminas (r. 1316–1341), although its precise origins and the date at which it acquired its name are uncertain. Nevertheless, under this name it was recorded in the 16th century written sources.

The cap played an important role in the inauguration of Lithuanian grand dukes. During the ceremony, the Bishop of Vilnius placed the headdress on the new ruler's head, while the Grand Marshal of Lithuania presented him with a sword. Such ceremonies are particularly well documented from the fifteenth and sixteenth centuries. The cap is mentioned in sixteenth-century historical sources and was kept in the state treasury. The original headdress has not survived. Its appearance is known chiefly from historical descriptions and iconographic representations.

The separate inauguration of Lithuanian grand dukes was discontinued following the Union of Lublin in 1569, and the cap consequently lost its ceremonial function. Nevertheless, ducal headgear continued to appear in Lithuanian heraldry, particularly above the coat of arms of the Grand Duchy, as well as in later artistic representations of Lithuanian rulers.

== Usage for inaugurations of Lithuanian monarchs ==
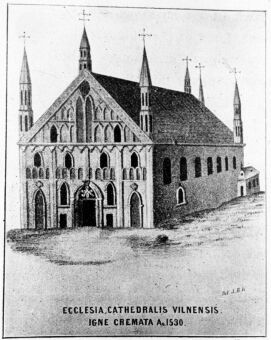
Vilnius Cathedral, the traditional setting for the inauguration of the Grand Dukes of Lithuania

The Cap of Gediminas was kept at the Vilnius Castle Complex treasury and under this name it was recorded in the 16th century written sources. The inaugurations of the Lithuanian monarchs were held in Vilnius Cathedral and consisted of the placement of Gediminas' Cap on the Lithuanian ruler's head and the presentation of a sword. The cap was placed on the head by the Bishop of Vilnius and the sword was presented by the Grand Marshal of Lithuania. The regalia of Grand Duke Vytautas the Great consisted of Cap of Gediminas, sword, ring, flag, and seal. The inauguration of Vytautas the Great with the Cap of Gediminas emphasized the continuity of Gediminids dynasty.

The first inauguration ceremony of a Lithuanian Grand Duke about which there is reliable information is that of Casimir IV Jagiellon, as reported by Jan Długosz. Casimir IV was sent by his older brother King of Poland and Hungary, Supreme Duke of Lithuania Władysław III, to Lithuania to rule in his name. But instead he was elected as Grand Duke upon his arrival to Vilnius on June 29, 1440, with the ringing of church bells and the singing of the Te Deum laudamus. This was breaching the agreements of the Union of Grodno (1432) and terminating the Polish–Lithuanian union. It manifested Lithuania as a sovereign state and its ruler Casimir IV Jagiellon stressed himself as a "free lord" (pan – dominus). According to historian Edvardas Gudavičius, Bishop of Vilnius put a Cap of Gediminas in the Vilnius Cathedral on his head, despite the Polish nobility's opposition.

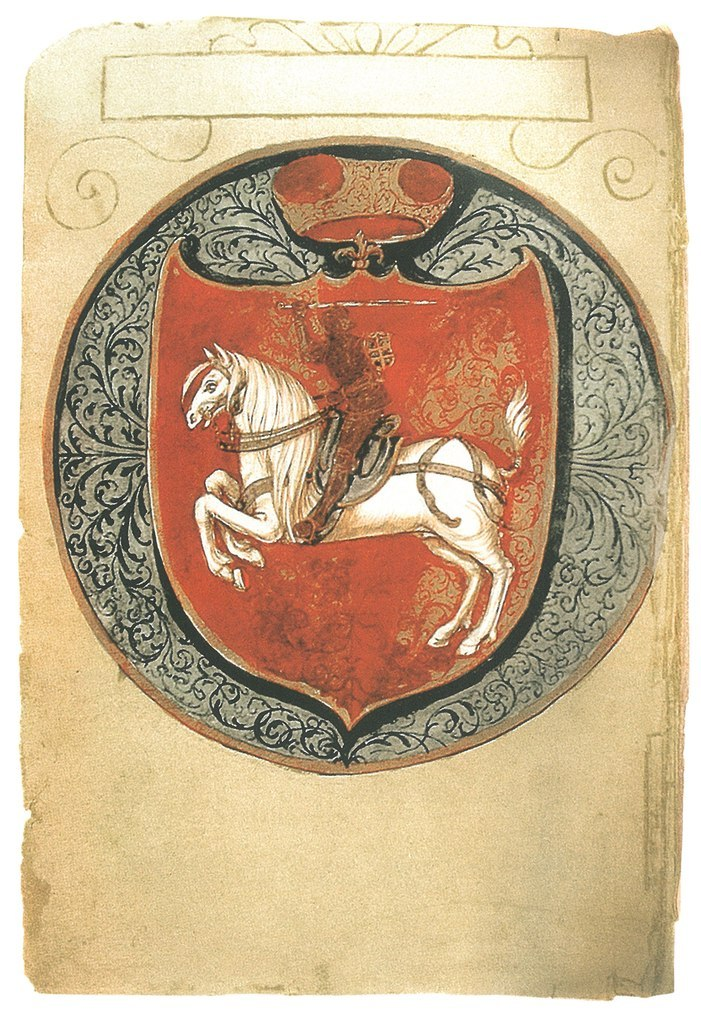
First page of the Latin copy of Laurentius (1531) of the First Statute of Lithuania

Another documented inauguration is the enthronement of Alexander Jagiellon in 1492. Alexander was appointed Grand Duke by his father, nevertheless, a formal election of the ruler was held as part of a general assembly, which was attended for the first time by representatives from all the lands of the Grand Duchy. According to the later account of Maciej Stryjkowski after the election lords elevated Alexander in the cathedral. The newly elected ruler was dressed "in a ducal cap with pearls and precious stones set in it, also the usual robe that today the princes of the Reich wear at the imperial coronation." Then Bishop of Vilnius Wojciech Tabor blessed him and held a pastoral exhortation over him. Then the Grand Marshal of Lithuania Petras Jonaitis Mantigirdaitis handed Alexander a bare sword and a sceptre. Subsequently, the Poles considered electing Alexander Jagiellon as the King of Poland, however instead of him John I Albert was elected as the King of Poland in August 1492 and this led to another termination of the Polish–Lithuanian union.

Stryjkowski also relayed the election and inauguration of Sigismund I as Grand Duke of Lithuania on October 20, 1506. The ceremony was again attended by Bishop Wojciech Tabor, who this time not only blessed but also placed a cap on the ruler's head. In turn, Grand Marshal Michael Glinski presented him with a sword. Sigismund received the oath of the Lithuanian lords while sitting on the throne. According to Stryjkowski, the cap was: "of red velvet with gold spheres set with precious stones".

The last ceremony to elevate a grand duke took place on October 18, 1529, when Sigismund Augustus was elevated to this dignity during his father's lifetime. The ceremony occurred in the great hall of the newly built lower castle, as the cathedral burned down that same year. The young Sigismund Augustus sat on the throne between his parents, surrounded by members of the council of lords. The cap was placed on the ruler's head by the Bishop of Vilnius, while the Grand Marshal presented him with a sword.

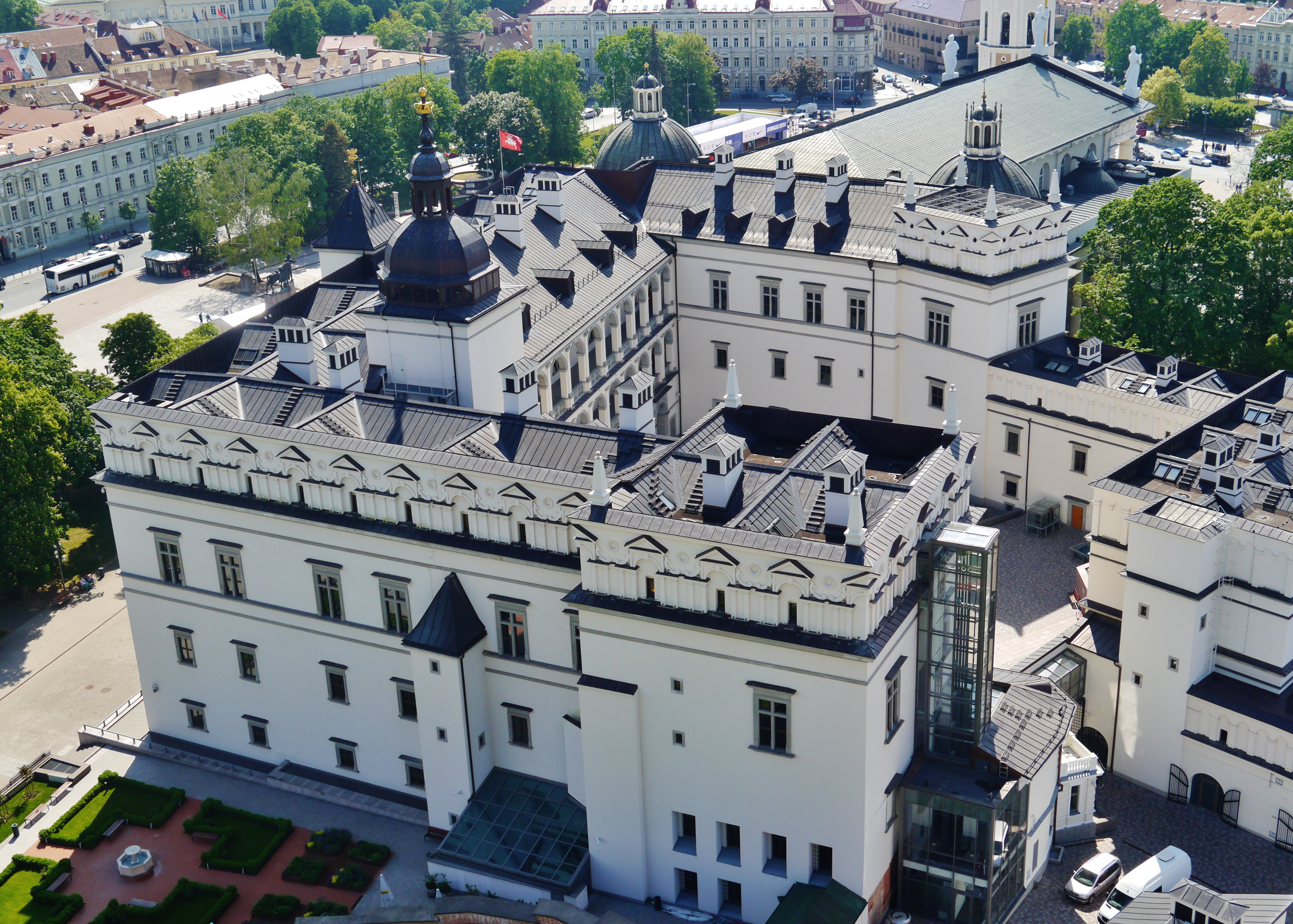
Palace of the Grand Dukes of Lithuania, where the ceremony of Sigismund II Augustus was held

Following the Union of Lublin, which formed the federative Polish–Lithuanian Commonwealth in 1569, and the death of Sigismund II Augustus, the last male ruler of the Jagiellonian dynasty, in 1572, separate inaugurations in Vilnius Cathedral were abolished, therefore Cap of Gediminas lost its ceremonial significance. The insignias of the Lithuanian rulers were not preserved and following the Union of Lublin only the seal (kept by the Grand Chancellor of Lithuania) and the flag (carried near the ruler by the Grand Flag Bearer of Lithuania) remained.

The demand of a separate inauguration ceremony of the Grand Duke of Lithuania was raised by the nobles of the Grand Duchy of Lithuania during the negotiations of the Union of Lublin, however it was not officially included into it. On 20 April 1576 a congress of the Grand Duchy of Lithuania's nobles was held in Grodno which adopted an Universal, signed by the participating Lithuanian nobles, which announced that if the delegates of the Grand Duchy of Lithuania will feel pressure from the Poles in the Election sejm, the Lithuanians will not be obliged by an oath of the Union of Lublin and will have the right to select a separate monarch. On 29 May 1580, bishop Merkelis Giedraitis in the Vilnius Cathedral presented Grand Duke Stephen Báthory (King of Poland since 1 May 1576) a luxuriously decorated sword and a hat adorned with pearls (both were sanctified by Pope Gregory XIII himself), while this ceremony manifested the sovereignty of the Grand Duchy of Lithuania and had the meaning of elevation of the new Grand Duke of Lithuania, this way ignoring the stipulations of the Union of Lublin. Nevertheless, per Union of Lublin the rulers of the Polish–Lithuanian Commonwealth were elected in joint Polish–Lithuanian election sejms until the Third Partition in 1795 and received separate titles of the King of Poland and Grand Duke of Lithuania. During the coronations of joint Polish–Lithuanian monarchs, the Polish crown was also announced as a property of both the Polish and Lithuanian nobles.

== Other visual usage ==
Besides the usage of the Cap of Gediminas as a ceremonial headdress for the inaugurations of Lithuanian monarchs, the image of the ducal cap was also used on other Lithuanian objects. Since 1547 the Cap of Gediminas was minted on Lithuanian coins above the coat of arms of Lithuania. Moreover, the Cap of Gediminas was depicted in the Great Seal of Lithuania and Lesser Seal of Lithuania until 1795.

In the 20th century, following the adoption of the Act of Independence of Lithuania by the Council of Lithuania, Lithuanian litas banknotes were issued with a portrait of Vytautas the Great wearing Cap of Gediminas to commemorate his 500th death anniversary in 1930. In 1936, new design 10 litas coins were minted also with a portrait of Vytautas the Great wearing Cap of Gediminas.

== Gallery ==
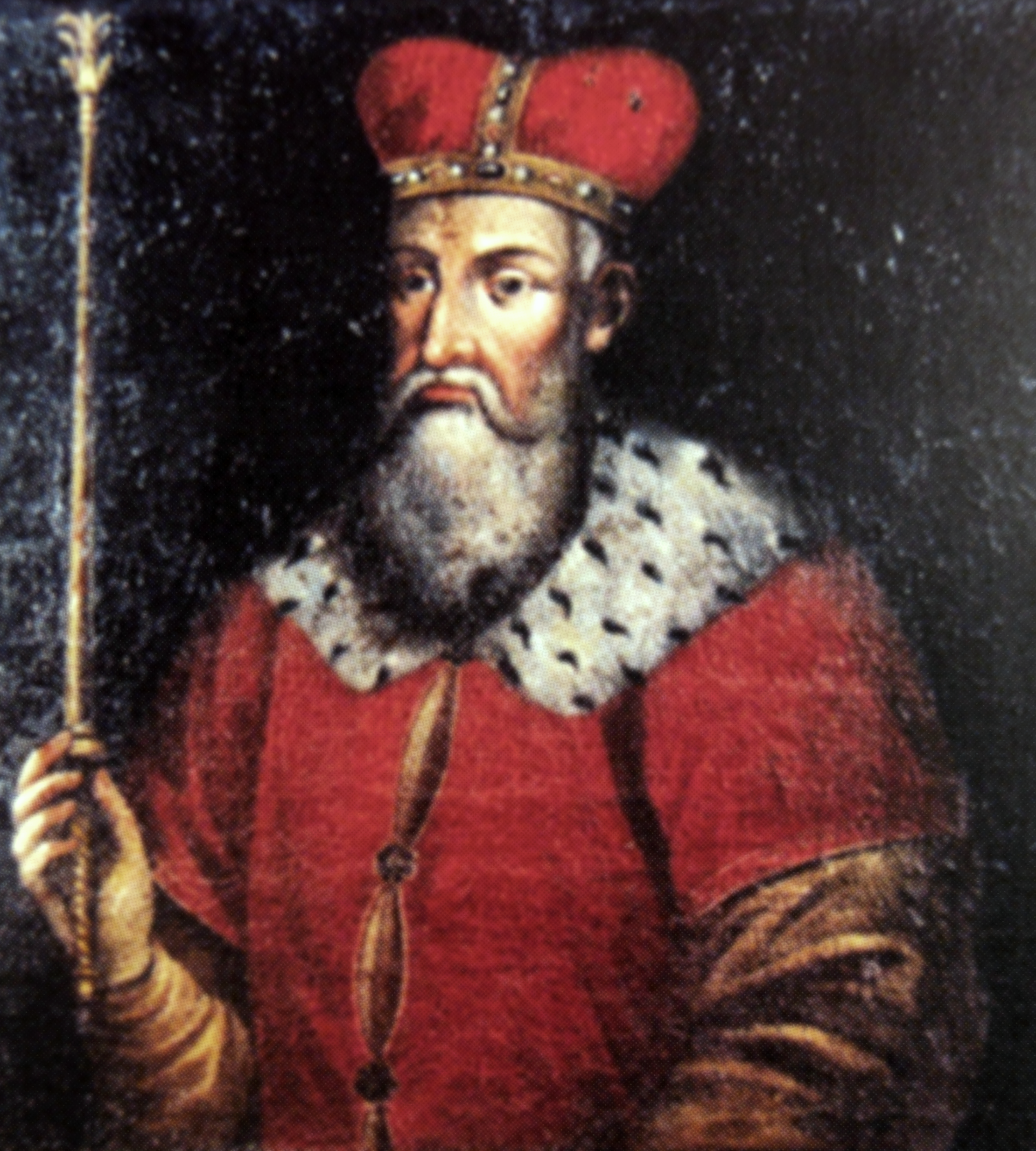
Vytenis with Cap of Gediminas, painted in 1709

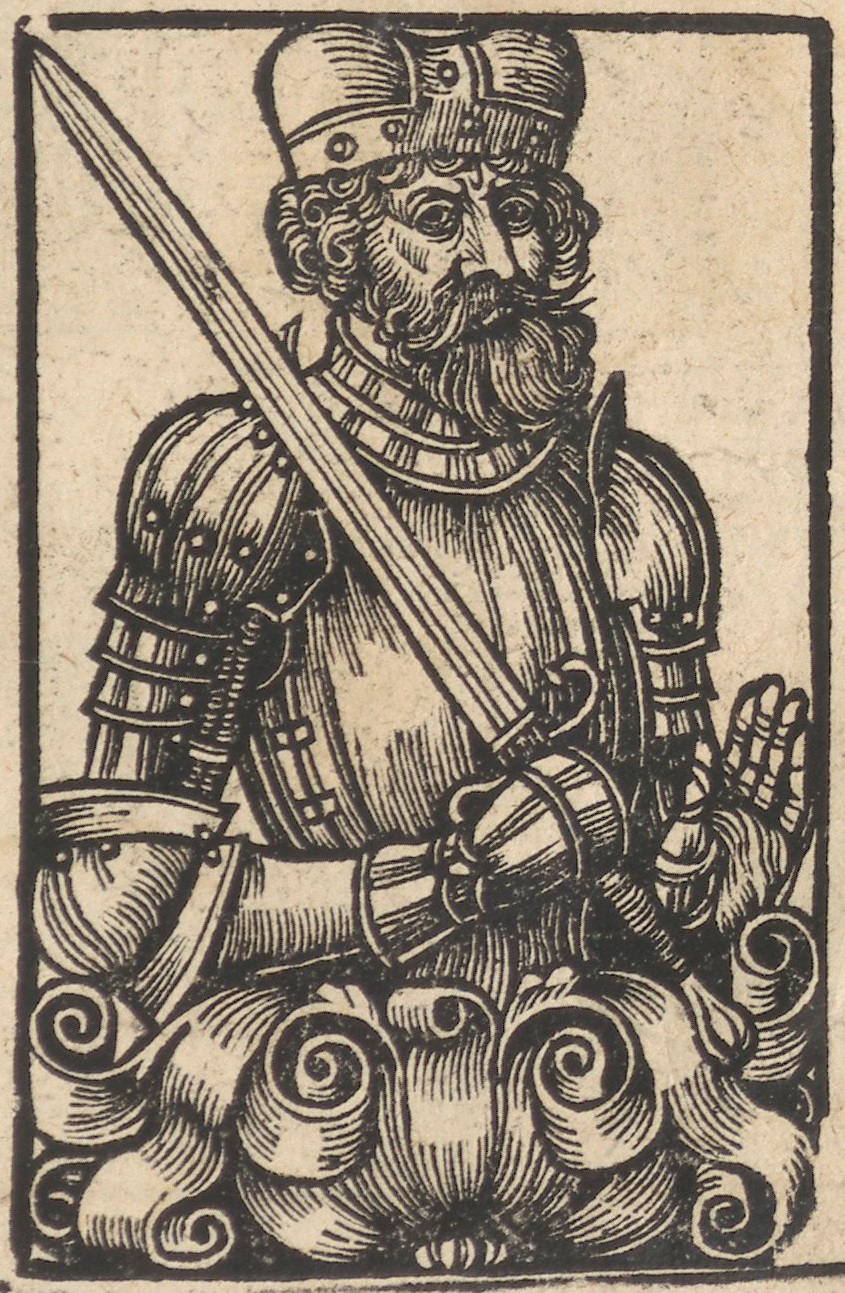
Algirdas with Cap of Gediminas, painted in 1578

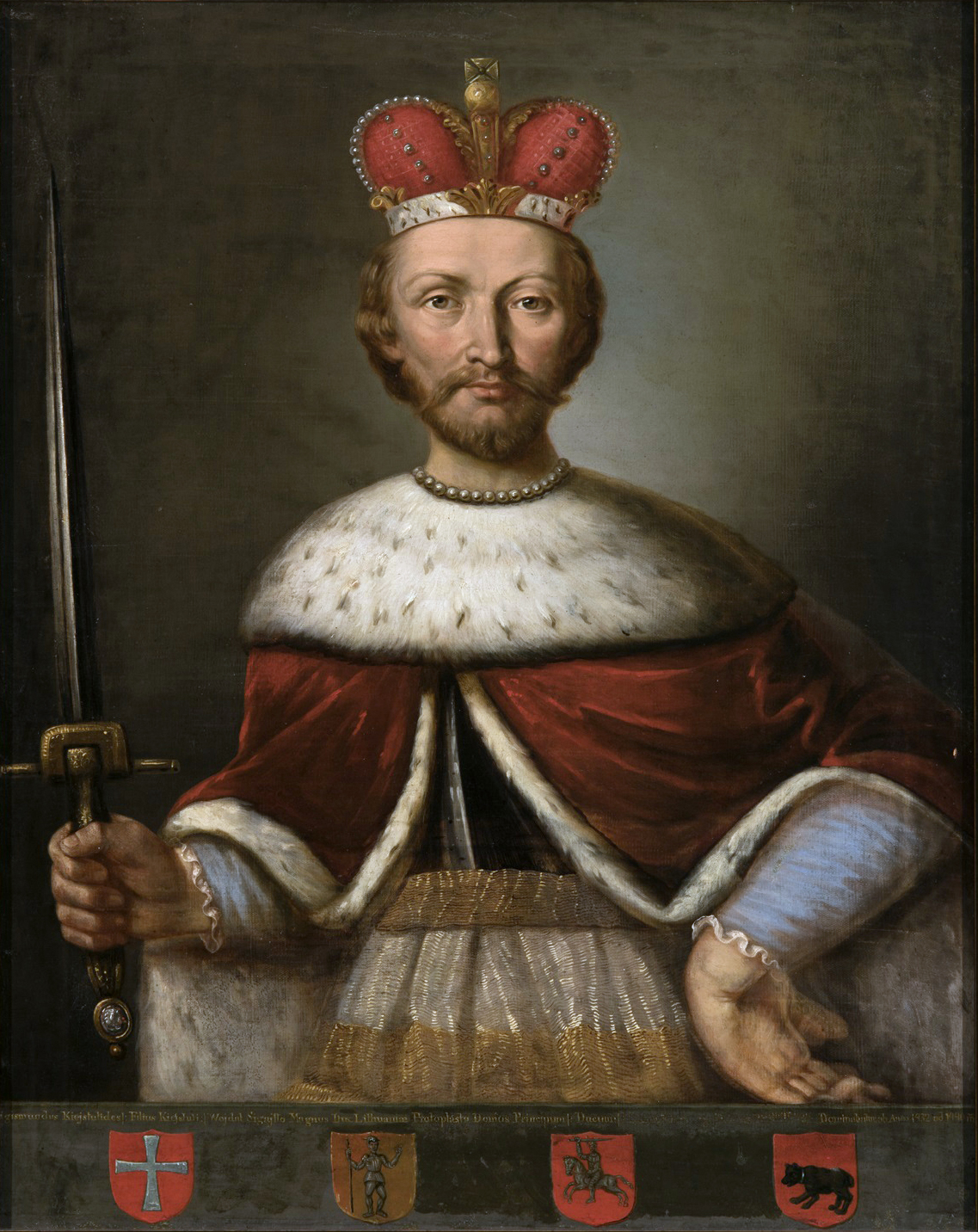
Sigismund Kęstutaitis with Cap of Gediminas, painted in the 19th century

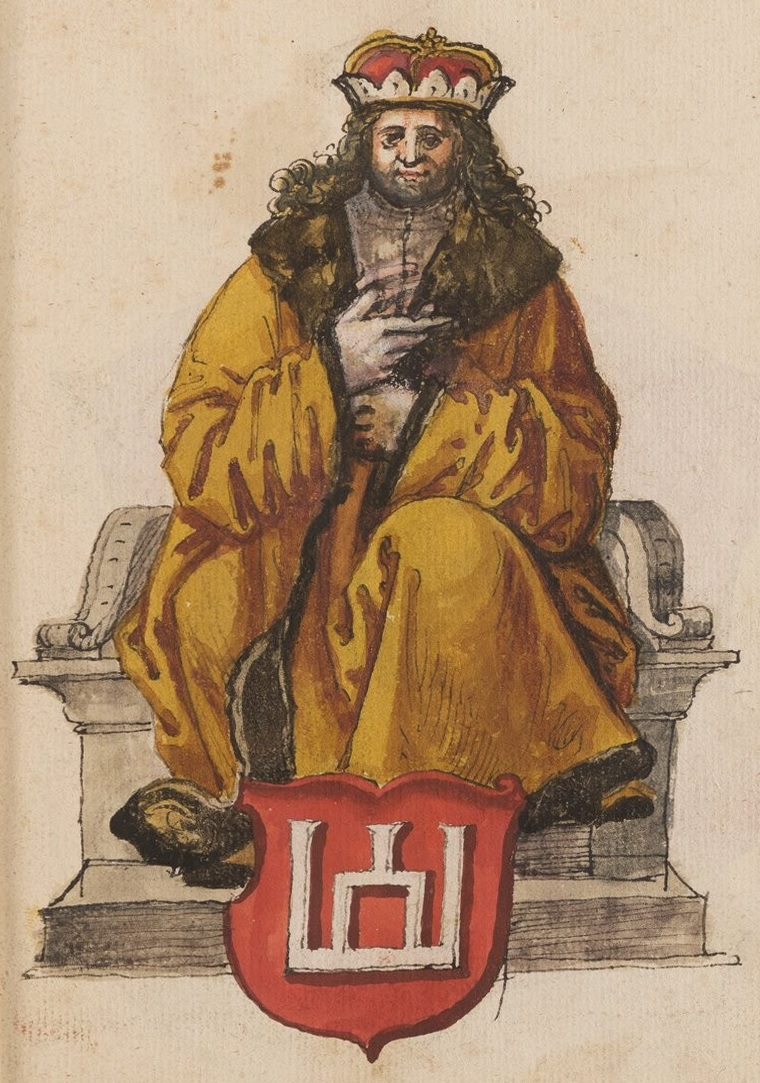
A grand duke of Lithuania wearing a ducal cap, depicted in Stemmata Polonica, an illuminated armorial manuscript

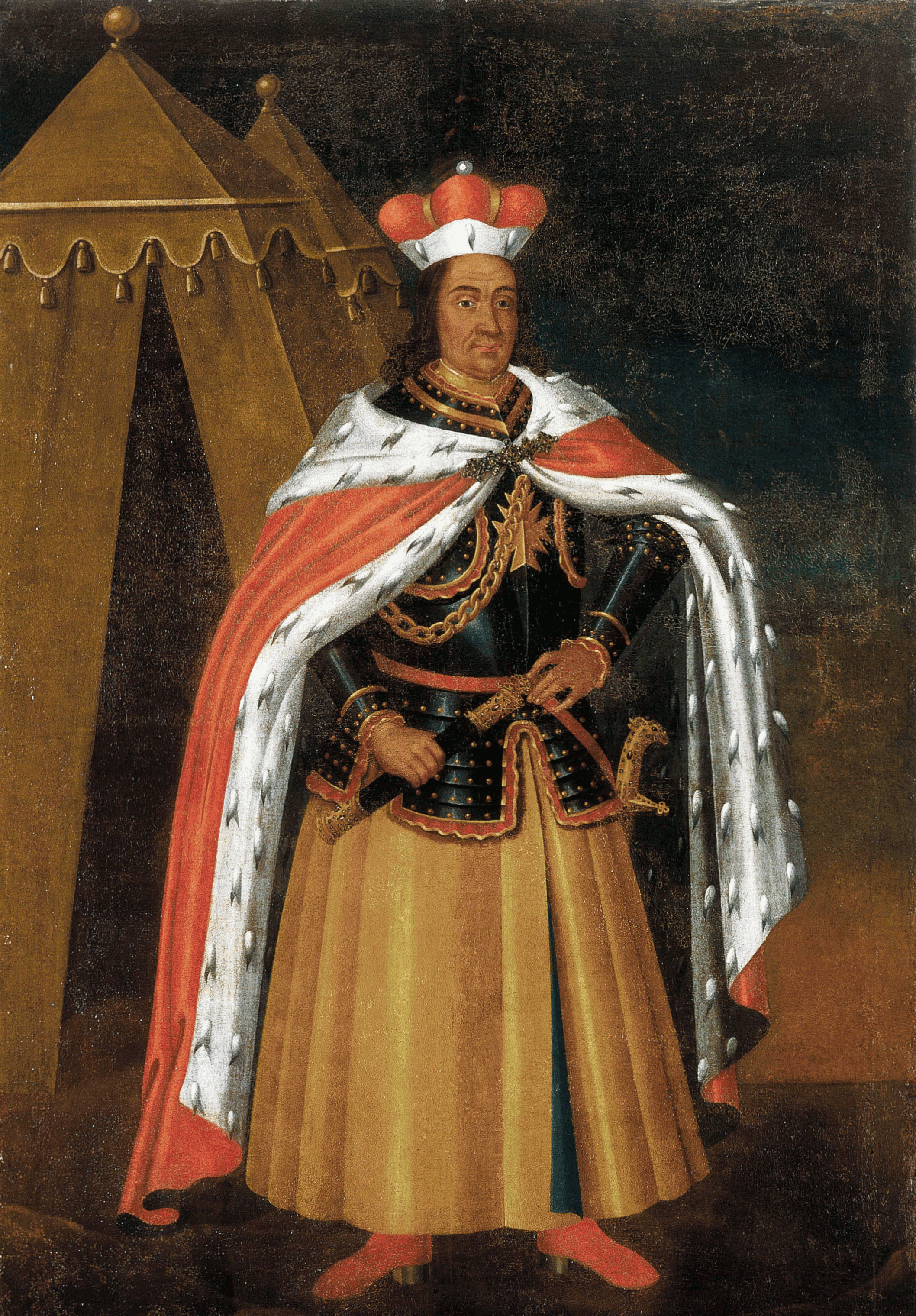
Vytautas the Great with Cap of Gediminas, painted in the 18th century

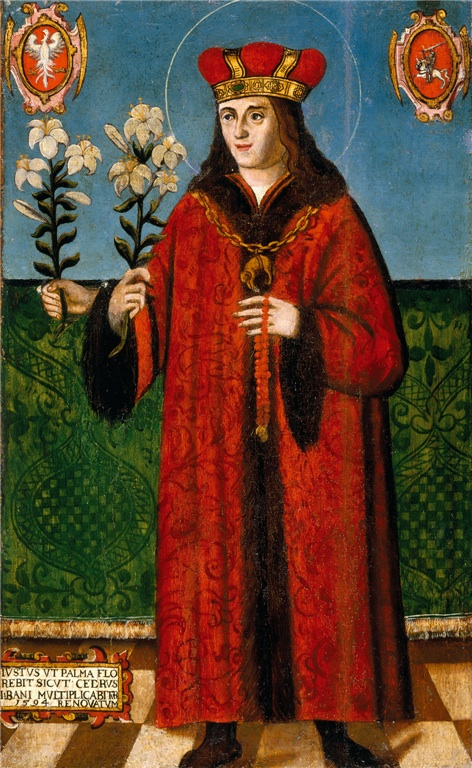
Saint Casimir with Cap of Gediminas, painted in circa 1594

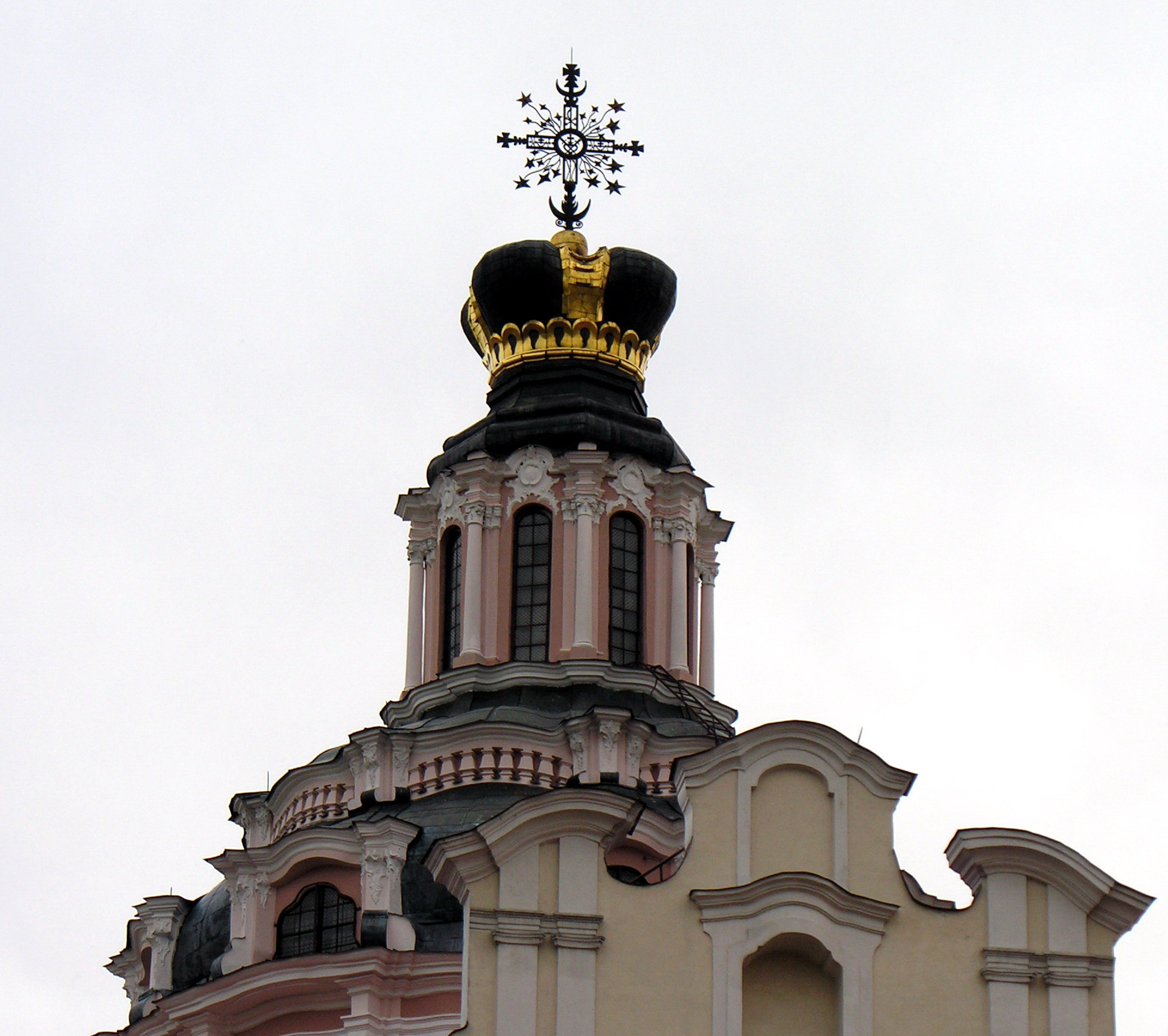
Dome of the Church of St. Casimir in Vilnius

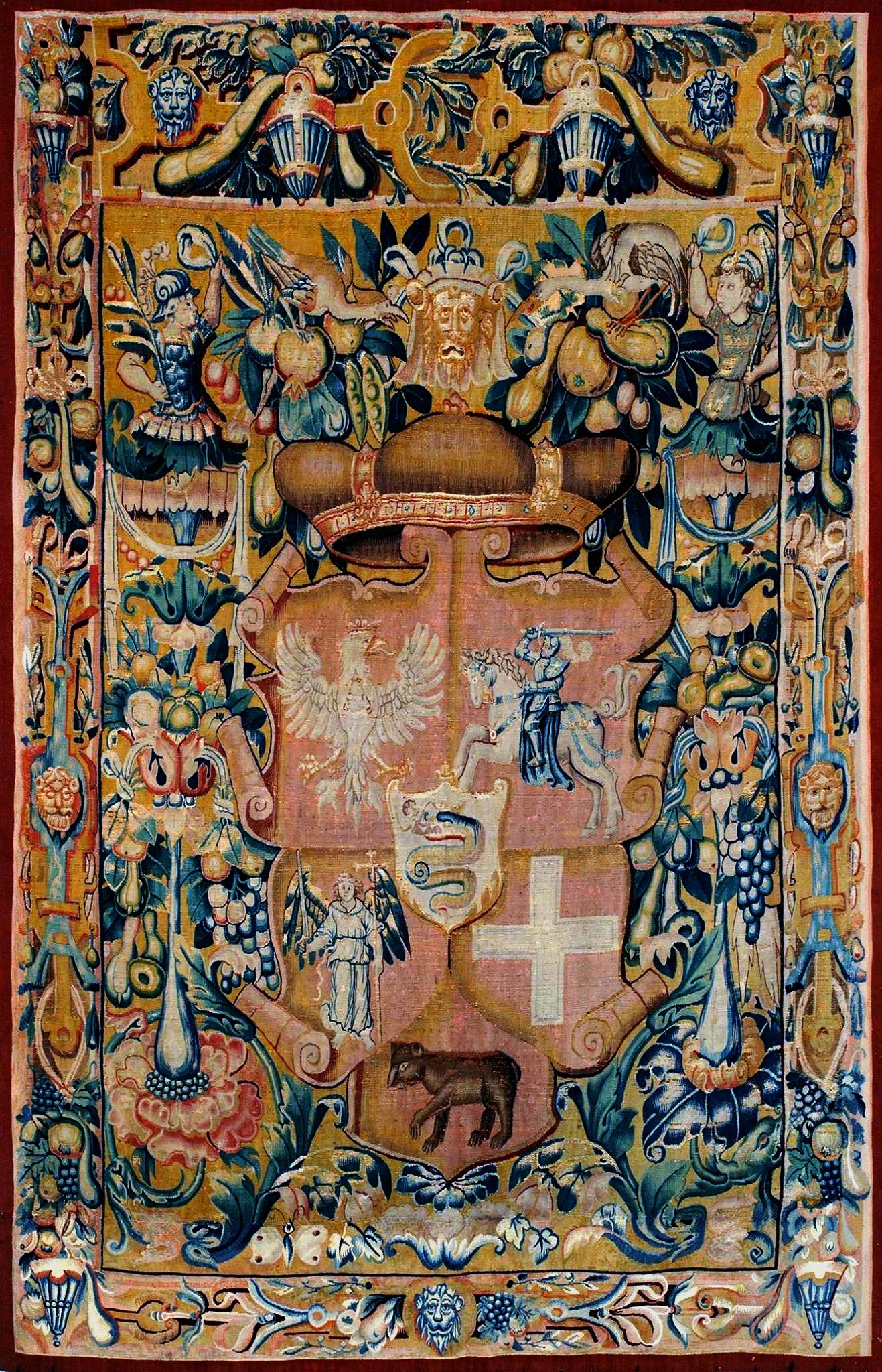
Tapestry with the coat of arms of Grand Duke Sigismund II Augustus, crowned with Cap of Gediminas, circa 1548

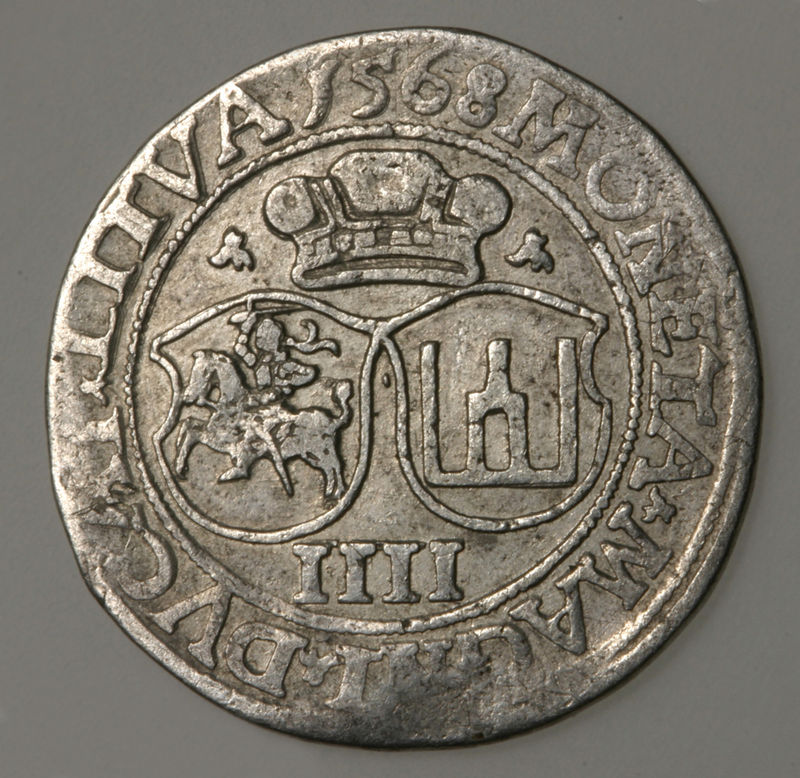
A 1568 Lithuanian coin of Grand Duke Sigismund II Augustus with the coat of arms of Lithuania, Cap of Gediminas and Columns of Gediminas

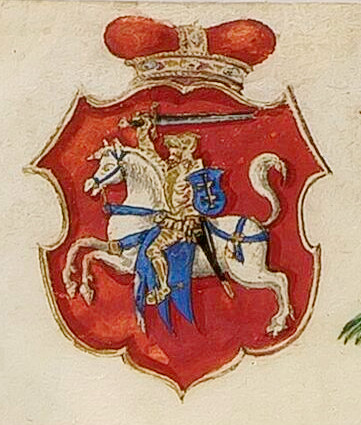
Ennoblement Act granted by Sigismund III Vasa (1588)

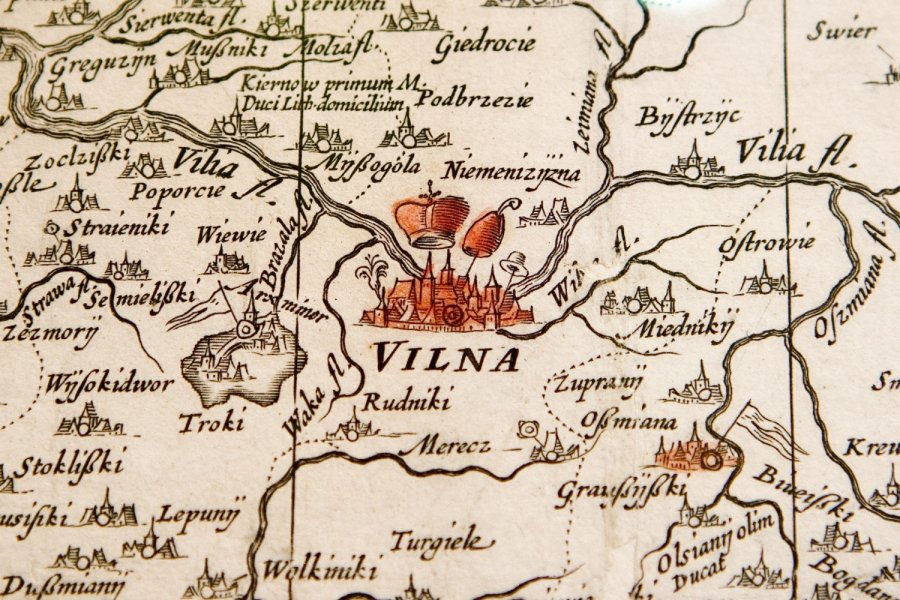
A fragment from the early 17th-century Radziwiłł map with Cap of Gediminas depicted above Vilnius

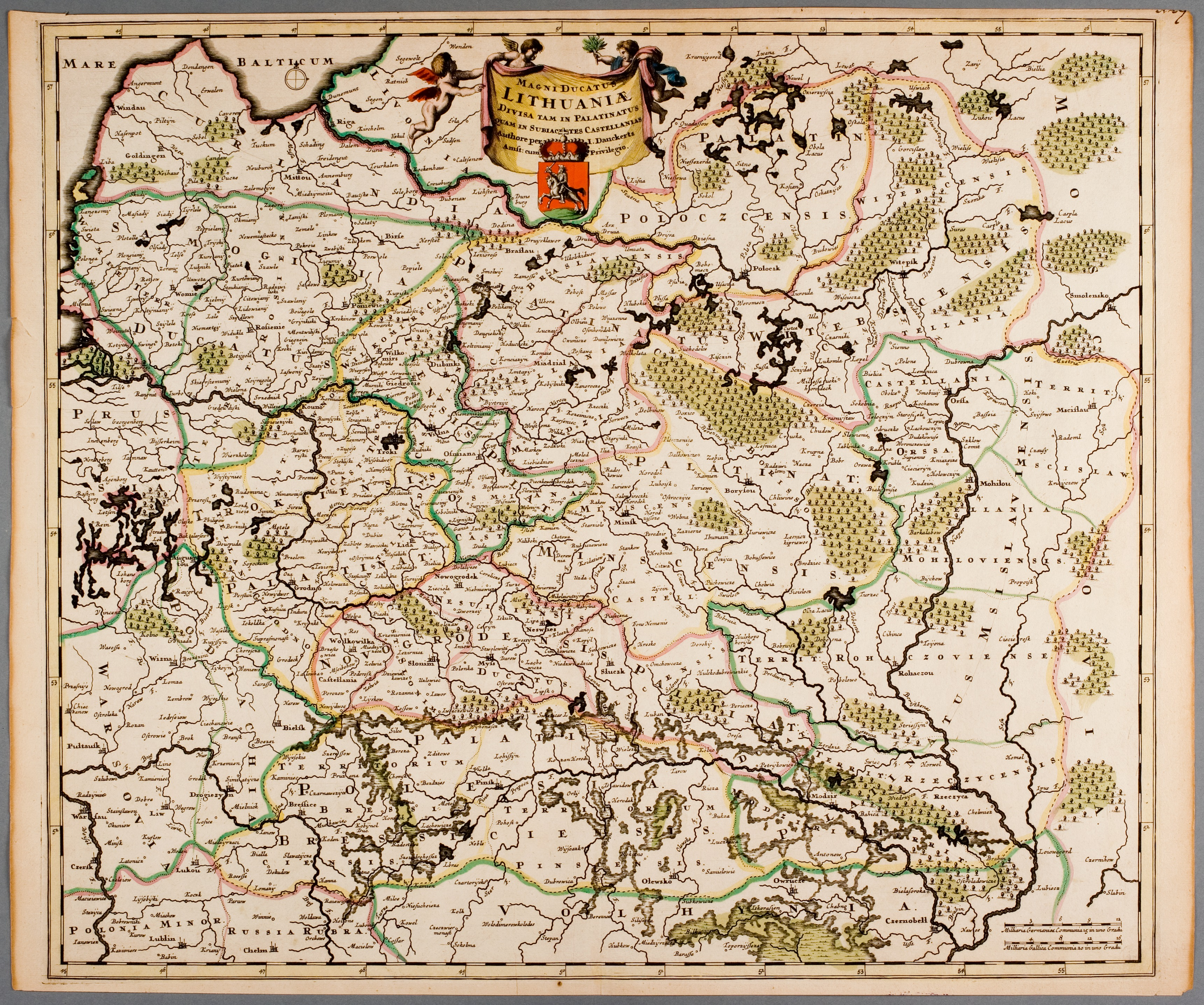
Administrative map of the Grand Duchy of Lithuania featuring Cap of Gediminas above the coat of arms of Lithuania in 1695

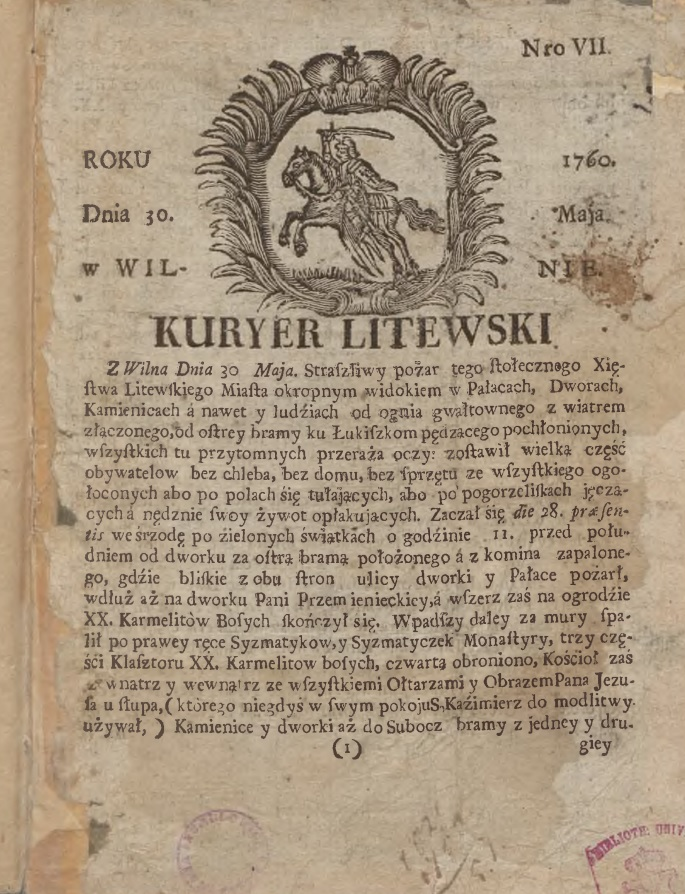
Title page of Kurier Litewski featuring Cap of Gediminas above the coat of arms of Lithuania, published in 1760 in Vilnius

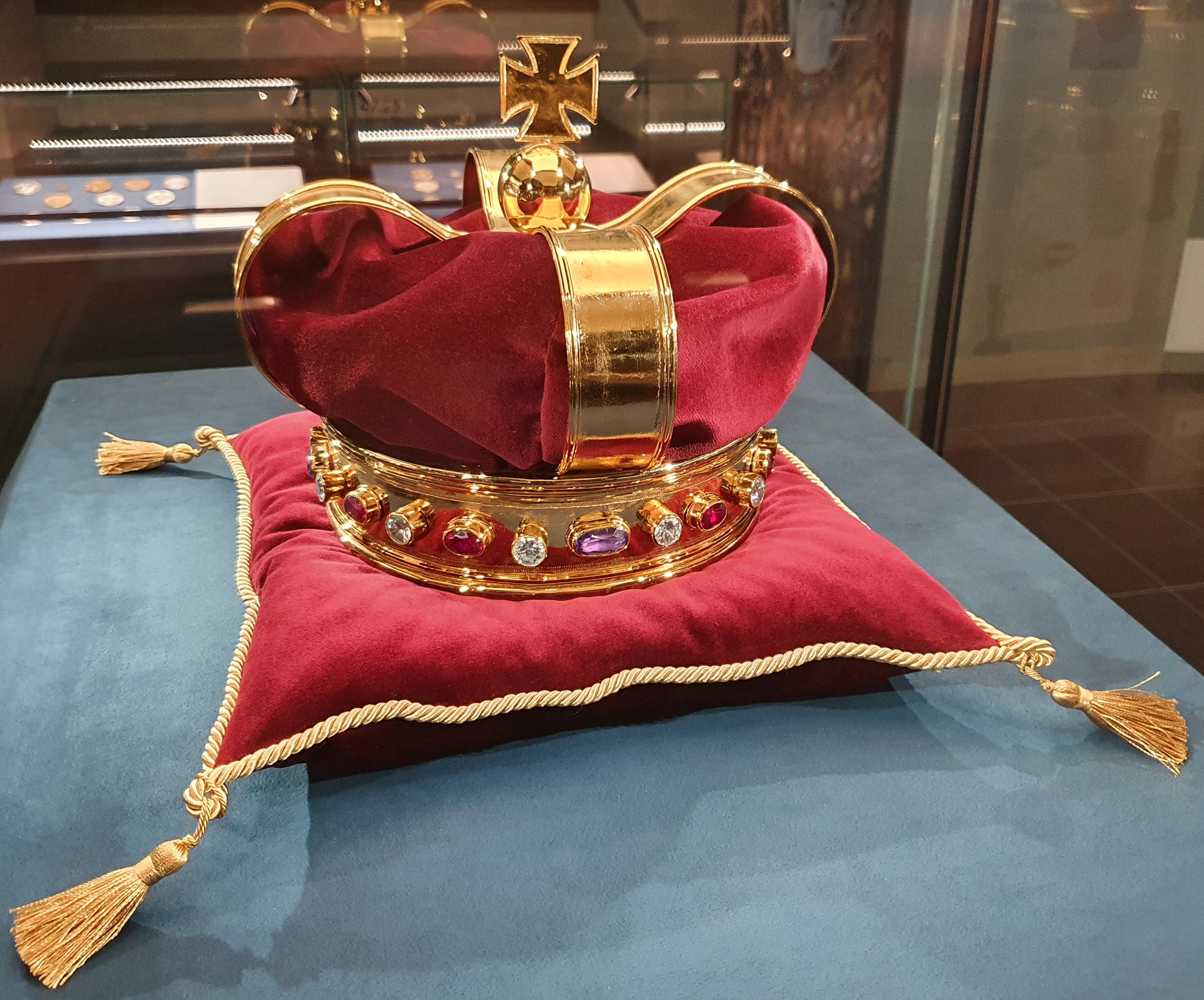
Front view of the reconstructed Cap of Gediminas, exhibited in the Palace of the Grand Dukes of Lithuania in Vilnius

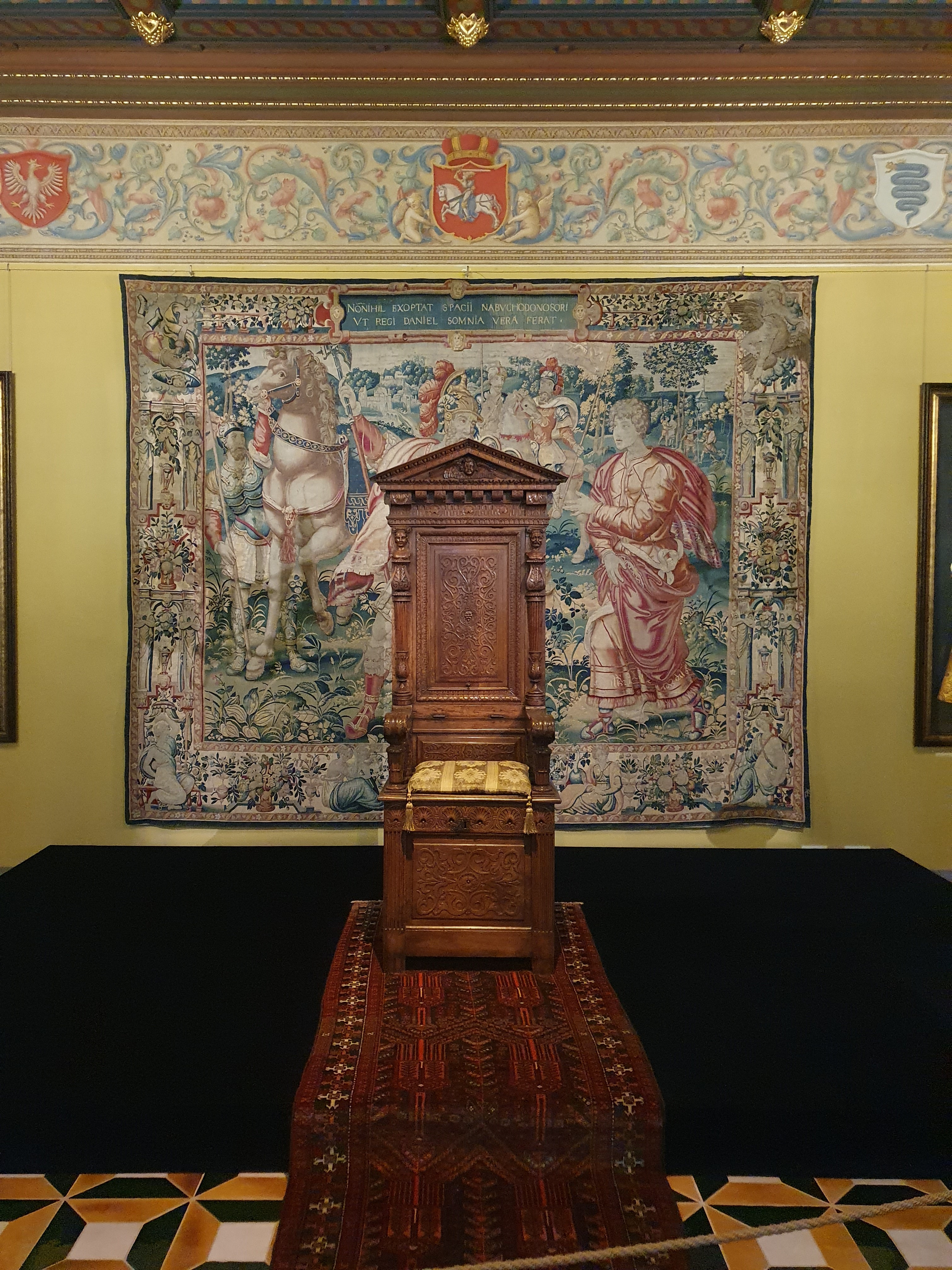
Coat of arms of Lithuania crowned with Cap of Gediminas in one of the rooms of the Palace of the Grand Dukes of Lithuania in Vilnius

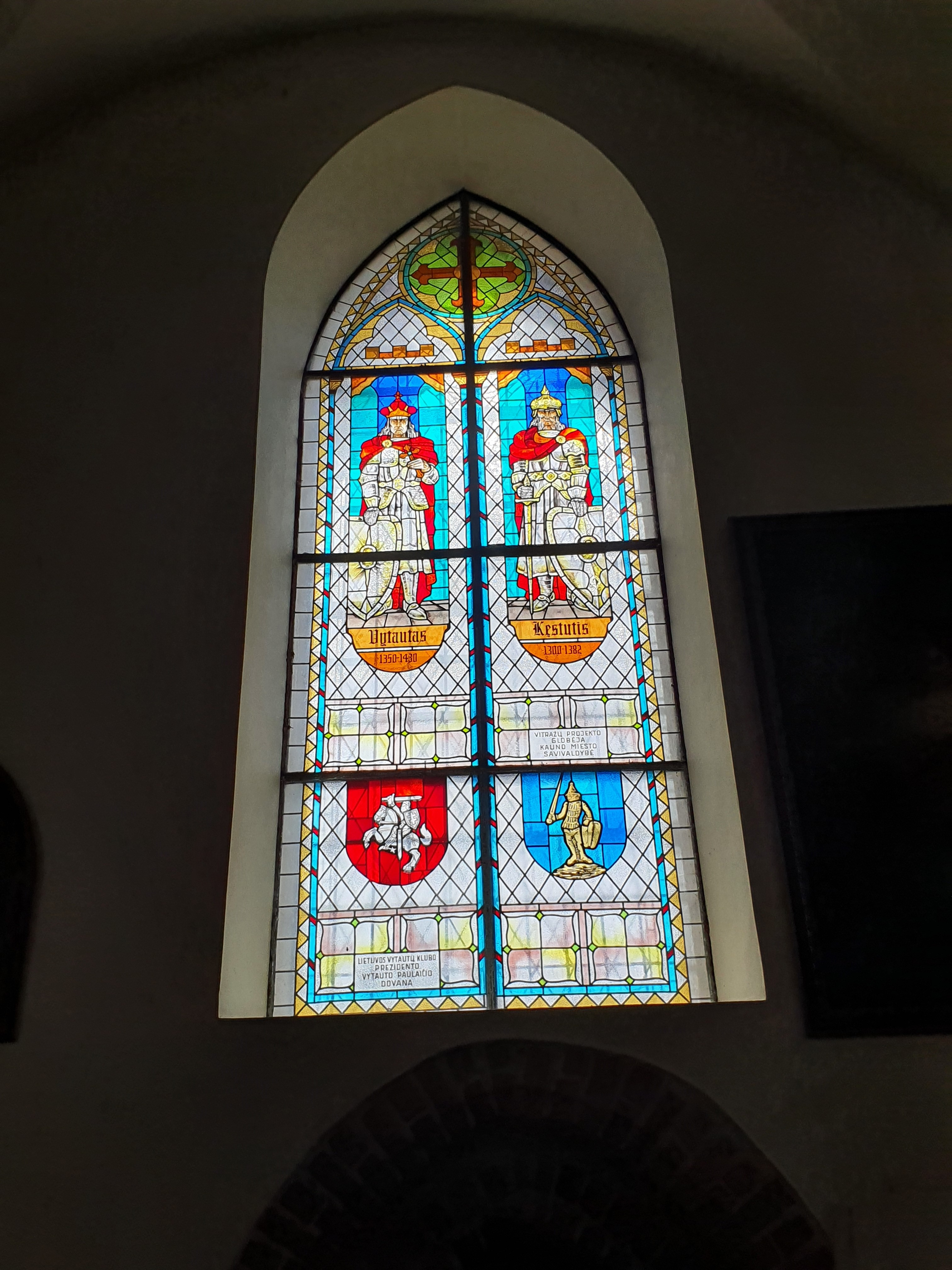
Stained-glass window with Vytautas the Great wearing Cap of Gediminas (left) in the Church of Vytautas the Great in Kaunas

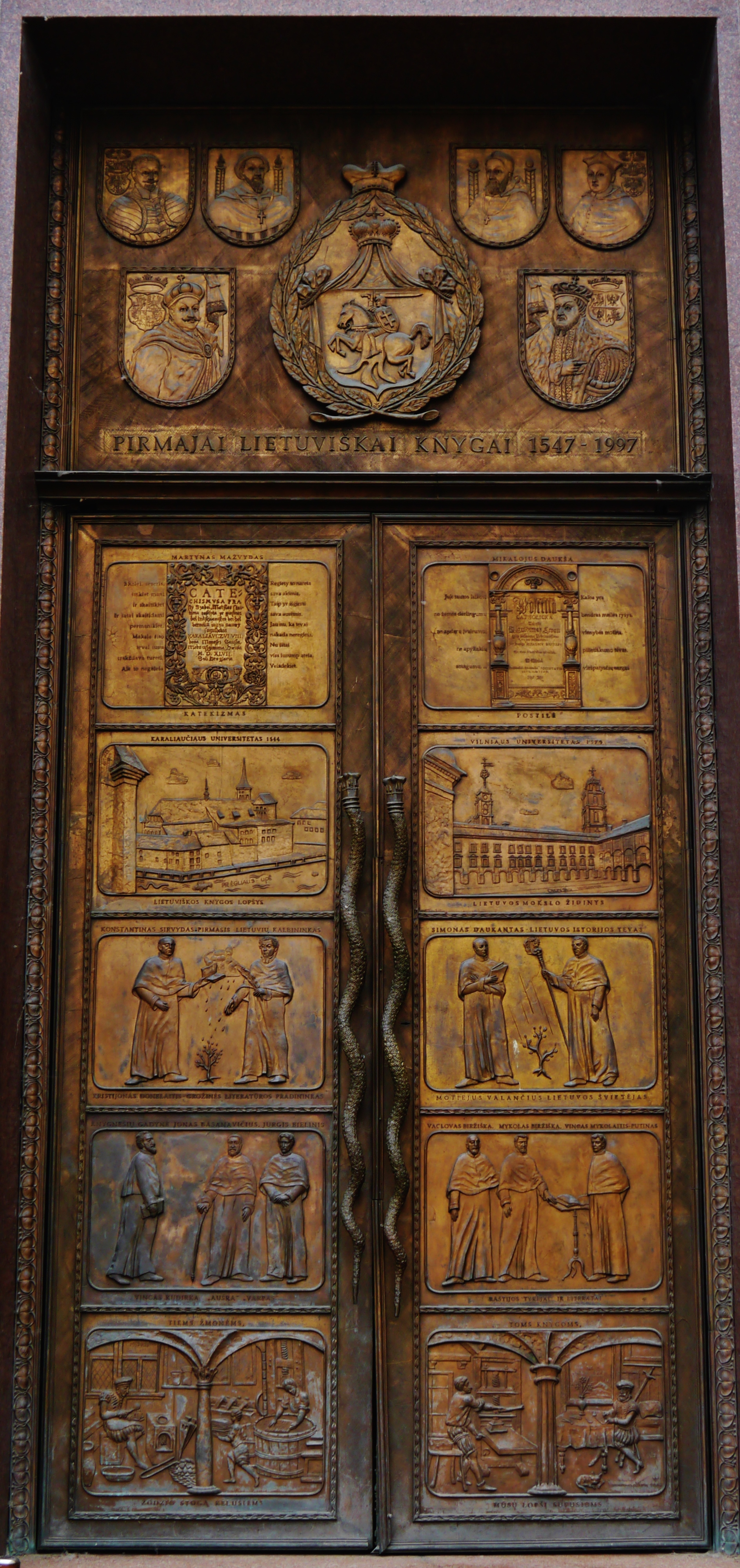
Cap of Gediminas depicted on the bronze doors of the Vilnius University Central Campus

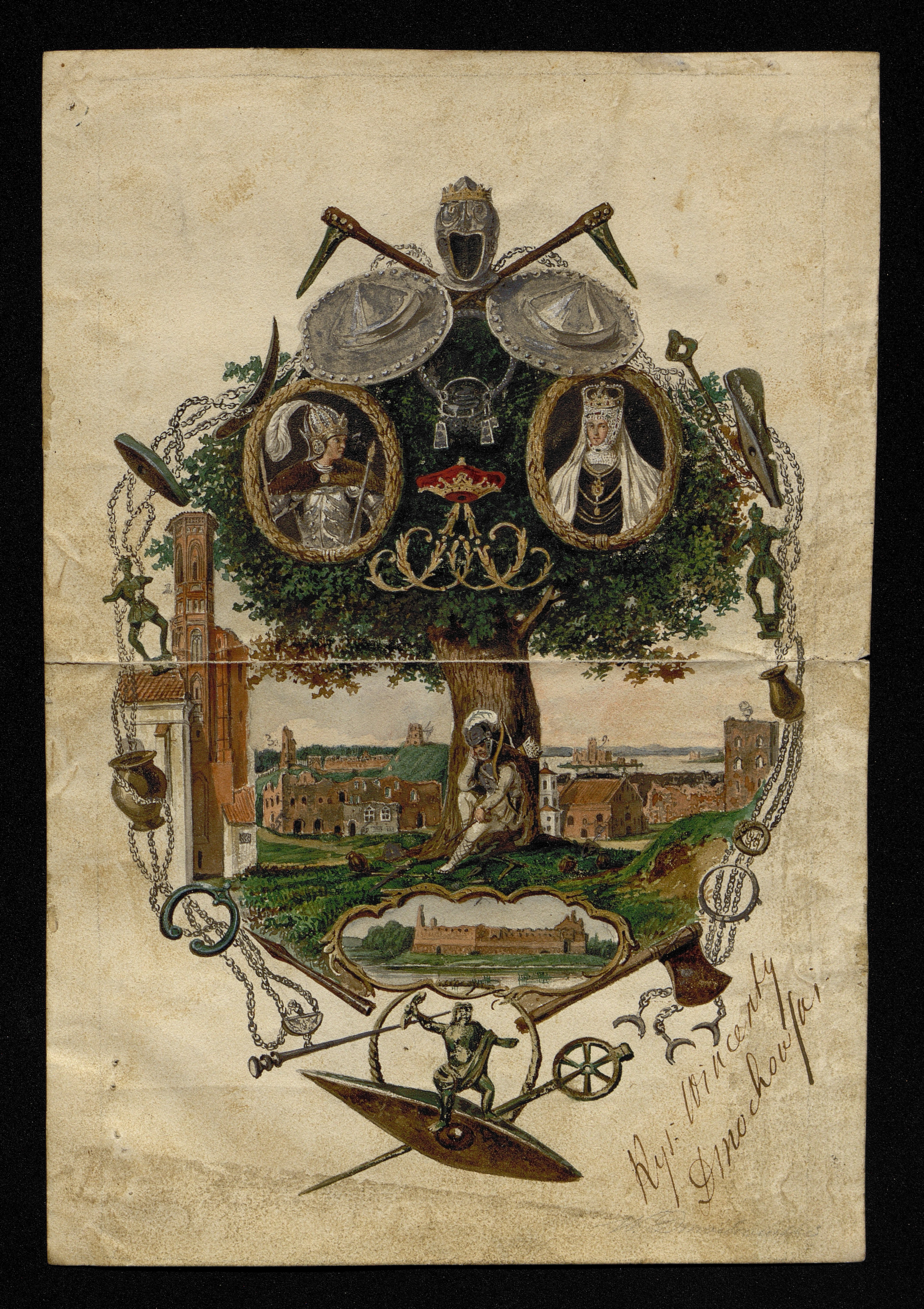
1848 Allegory of Lithuania by Wincenty Dmochowski. The Cap of Gediminas is depicted in the middle of an Oak tree

In the modern day the Cap of Gediminas is used on the coat of arms of the Seimas of Lithuania

== See also ==
- Polish crown jewels, used by joint Polish–Lithuanian monarchs following the Union of Lublin in 1569
- Cap of maintenance, a similar royal insignia of the British sovereign
- Gediminas' Tower

== Bibliography ==
- Frost, Robert (2015). The Oxford History of Poland-Lithuania. The Making of the Polish-Lithuanian Union, 1385—1569. Oxford. ISBN 978-0-19-820869-3.
- Kosman, Marceli (1989). ""Podniesienie" książąt litewskich" ["Elevation" of the Lithuanian princes]. Litwa pierwotna. Mity, legendy, fakty. pp. 244–282.
- Piech, Zenon (1987). "Mitra książęca w świetle przekazów ikonograficznych od czasów rozbicia dzielnicowego do końca epoki jagiellońskiej" [Ducal mitre in the light of iconographic records from the time of the fragmentation to the end of the Jagiellonian era]. Kwartalnik Historii Kultury Materialnej. 39 (1).
