= List of universities and colleges in Lithuania =

List of universities and colleges in Lithuania is a listing of higher education (third level education) institutions in Lithuania.

== Universities ==
There are 17 universities in Lithuania:

#	Name		Type	Est.	Primary campus	Academic staff 2025–26	Students 2025–26	State financing (2024)	
#	English	Lithuanian	Type	Est.	Primary campus	Academic staff 2025–26	Students 2025–26	State financing (2024)	
1	European Humanities University	Europos Humanitarinis Universitetas (EHU)	Private not-for-profit institution	2006	Vilnius	118	Students 2025–26	1,600	–
2	Faculty of Economics and Informatics of the University of Bialystok	Balstogės universiteto filialas "Ekonomikos-informatikos fakultetas"	Branch	2007	Vilnius	12	352	–	
3	General Jonas Žemaitis Military Academy of Lithuania	Lietuvos karo akademija (LKA)	Government institution	1992	Vilnius	59	447		
4	ISM University of Management and Economics	ISM Vadybos ir ekonomikos universitetas	For-profit	1999	Vilnius	78	2,226		
5	Kaunas University of Technology	Kauno technologijos universitetas (KTU)	Public institution	1922	Kaunas	950	7,921	€62.90 mln	
6	Kazimieras Simonavičius University	Kazimiero Simonavičiaus universitetas	For-profit	2004	Vilnius	44	1,076	–	
7	Klaipėda University	Klaipėdos universitetas (KU)	Public institution	1991	Klaipėda	904	3,058	€15.47 mln	
8	LCC International University	LCC tarptautinis universitetas	Private not-for-profit institution	1991	Klaipėda	63	468	–	
9	Lithuanian Academy of Music and Theatre	Lietuvos muzikos ir teatro akademija	Public institution	1919	Vilnius	445	1,082	€15.73 mln	
10	Lithuanian Sports University	Lietuvos sporto universitetas (LSU)	Public institution	1934	Kaunas	146	1,794	€7.43 mln	
11	Lithuanian University of Health Sciences	Lietuvos sveikatos mokslų universitetas	Public institution	1922	Kaunas	1,926	8,293	€56.29 mln	
12	Mykolas Romeris University	Mykolo Romerio universitetas	Public institution	1990	Vilnius	512	6,020	€12.60 mln	
13	Vilnius Academy of Arts	Vilniaus dailės akademija (VDA)	Public institution	1940	Vilnius	425	1,824	€16.02 mln	
14	Vilnius Gediminas Technical University	Vilniaus Gedimino technikos universitetas (VGTU)	Public institution	1956	Vilnius	1,501	9,082	€47.79 mln	
15	Vilnius St. Joseph Seminary	Vilniaus šv. Juozapo kunigų seminarija	Religious institution	1582	Vilnius	32	27	€0.12 mln	
16	Vilnius University	Vilniaus universitetas (VU)	Public institution	1579	Vilnius	5,178	24,889	€157.33 mln	
17	Vytautas Magnus University	Vytauto Didžiojo universitetas (VDU)	Public institution	1922	Kaunas	1,125	9,144	€47.77 mln	

== Colleges ==
There are 19 colleges in Lithuania. "University of Applied Sciences", sometimes shortened as UAS, is a revamped term denoting such institutions.

#	English name	Lithuanian name	Type	Est.	Primary location	Staff	Students 2023–24
1	Alytus College (Note: To be unified with the #3 Kaunas College, starting in 2024–25)	Alytaus kolegija	Public institution	2000	Alytus	114*	▲795
2	Kaunas College	Kauno kolegija	Public institution	2000	Kaunas	823	▼4,569
3	Kaunas Forestry and Environmental Engineering University of Applied Sciences (Note: To be unified with the #5 Kaunas University of Applied Engineering Sciences, starting in 2024–25)	Kauno miškų ir aplinkos inžinerijos kolegija	Public institution	2002	Girionys (Kaunas District)	80*	▼733
4	Kaunas University of Applied Engineering Sciences	Kauno technikos kolegija	Public institution	2002	Kaunas	238	▼939
5	Klaipėda State College	Klaipėdos valstybinė kolegija	Public institution	2002	Klaipėda	345	▲2,520
6	Kolping University of Applied Sciences	Kolpingo kolegija	Private not-for-profit institution	2001	Kaunas	29	▲356
7	Lithuania Business University of Applied Sciences	Lietuvos verslo kolegija	Private not-for-profit institution	2001	Klaipėda	61	▼983
8	Lithuanian Maritime Academy (Note: To be reorganized, integrating its programs into the Vilnius Gediminas Technical University, starting in 2024–25)	Lietuvos aukštoji jūreivystės mokykla	Public institution	2001	Klaipėda	114*	▼622
9	Marijampolė University of Applied Sciences (Note: To become a faculty of the Mykolas Romeris University, starting in 2024–25)	Marijampolės kolegija	Public institution	2001	Marijampolė	104*	▲729
10	Panevėžys College	Panevėžio kolegija	Public institution	2002	Panevėžys	160	▲1,273
11	SMK College of Applied Sciences	SMK Aukštoji mokykla	Private not-for-profit institution	2001	Klaipėda	127	▲4,332
12	St. Ignatius of Loyola University of Applied Sciences	Šv. Ignaco Lojolos kolegija	Private not-for-profit institution	2011	Kaunas	125	▼469
13	Šiauliai State College	Šiaulių valstybinė kolegija	Public institution	2002	Šiauliai	179	▲1,630
14	Utena University of Applied Sciences	Utenos kolegija	Public institution	2000	Utena	180	▲1,708
15	Vilnius Business College	Vilniaus verslo kolegija	Private not-for-profit institution	2001	Vilnius	34	▲1,167
16	Vilnius College	Vilniaus kolegija	Public institution	2000	Vilnius	1,030	▼5,340
17	Vilnius College of Design	Vilniaus dizaino kolegija	Private not-for-profit institution	2005	Vilnius	33	▼342
18	Vilnius College of Technologies and Design (Note: To be unified with the #17 Vilnius College, starting in 2024–25)	Vilniaus technologijų ir dizaino kolegija	Public institution	2002	Vilnius	328*	▼1,524

== Former ==
- Academy of Business and Management (Verslo ir vadybos akademija) was acquired and merged into Kazimieras Simonavičius University in 2013
- Lithuanian University of Agriculture (Lietuvos žemės ūkio universitetas) was reorganized into Vytautas Magnus University Agriculture Academy in 2019
- Vilnius Pedagogical University (Vilniaus pedagoginis universitetas) was reorganized into Vytautas Magnus University Education Academy in 2019
- Šiauliai University (Šiaulių universitetas) was reorganized into Vilnius University Šiauliai Academy in 2021
- Telšiai Bishop Vincentas Borisevičius Priest Seminary lost accreditation in 2021
- International School of Law and Business (Tarptautinė teisės ir verslo aukštoji mokykla), a for-profit college in Vilnius, was closed in July 2024

== See also ==
- List of schools in Lithuania
- List of universities in Estonia
- List of universities in Latvia
- List of universities in Poland
- List of colleges and universities by country
- List of colleges and universities
