= VTDK =

VTDK or VtdK may refer to:

- Vilnius College of Technologies and Design (VTDK), a Lithuanian state institution of higher education
- Vereniging tegen de Kwakzalverij (VtdK), a Dutch skeptical association campaigning against quackery
