= Lesser Seal of Lithuania =

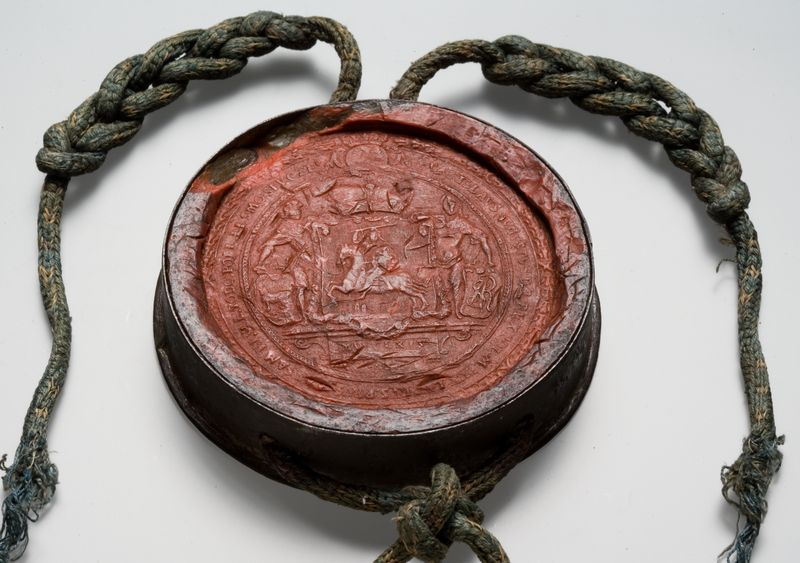
Lesser Seal of Lithuania, used during the reign of Stanisław August Poniatowski in 1764–1795.

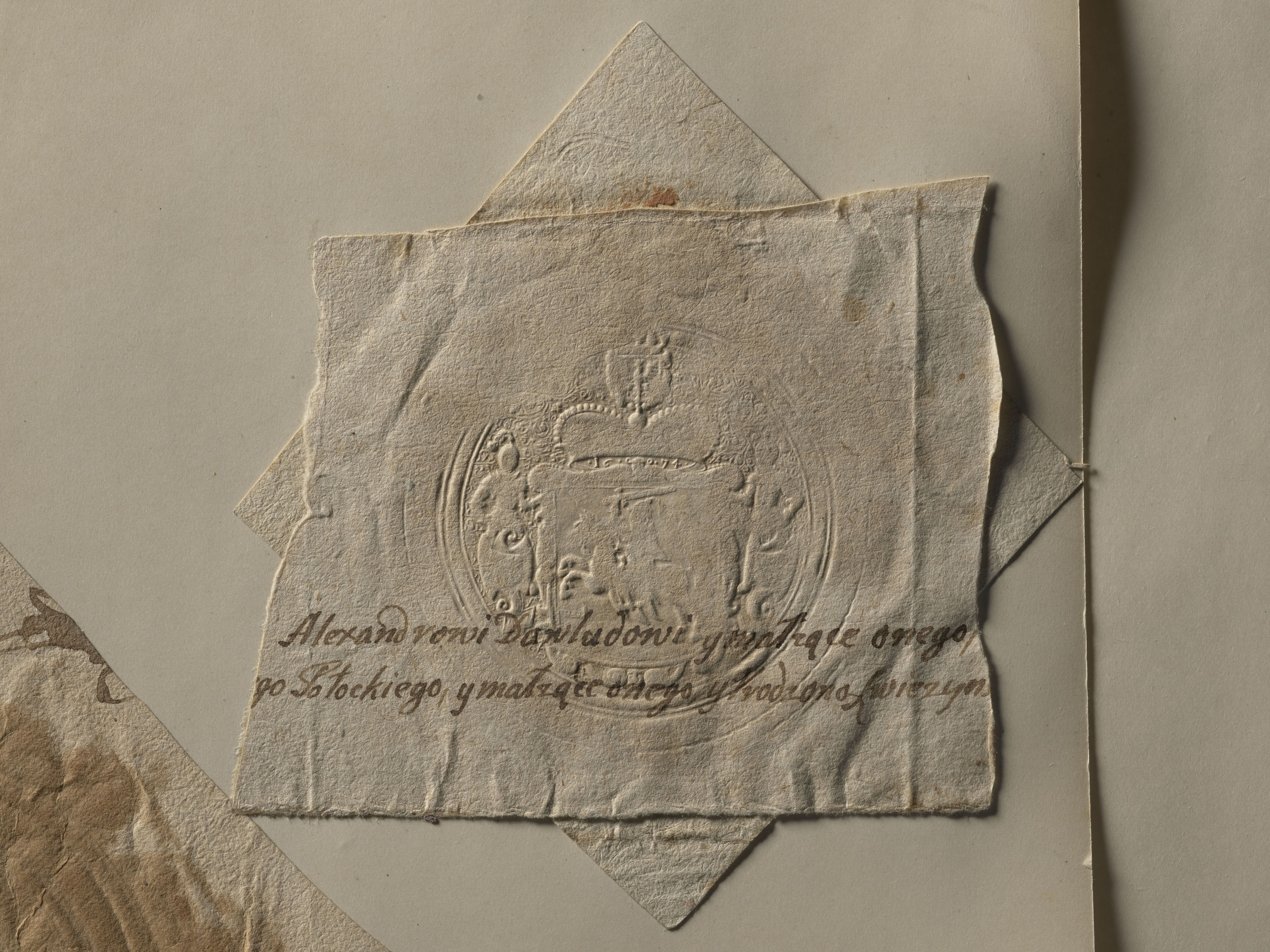
Lesser Seal of Lithuania, used during the reign of John III Sobieski in 1674–1696.

The Lesser Seal of Lithuania (Lithuanian: Lietuvos mažasis antspaudas; Polish: pieczęć mniejsza litewska) was a national seal of the Grand Duchy of Lithuania which was possessed by the vice-chancellor of Lithuania until 1795. The vice-chancellor of Lithuania used the Lesser Seal of Lithuania to confirm Lithuanian monarchs ordinances and laws, to conclude treaties and to send and receive messengers (this way performing functions of the Grand Chancellor of Lithuania).

Both the Great Seal of Lithuania and the Lesser Seal of Lithuania had equal legal force, however an act confirmed by the Grand Chancellor of Lithuania with the Great Seal of Lithuania was more prestigious. After concluding the Union of Lublin in 1569 which established the Polish–Lithuanian Commonwealth, a federative real union state, the Grand Duchy of Lithuania remained a separate state from the Crown of the Kingdom of Poland and the jointly elected monarchs of the Polish–Lithuanian Commonwealth acts were void in the Grand Duchy of Lithuania without their confirmation with the Great Seal of Lithuania or the Lesser Seal of Lithuania.

The oldest university in Lithuania – Vilnius University was established in 1579 when the Lithuanian vice-chancellor Eustachy Wołłowicz confirmed the privilege of Stephen Bathory, a king of Poland and Grand Duke of Lithuania, regarding the conversion of the Jesuits College of Vilnius to a university.

In the outer and inner circles of the Lesser Seal of Lithuania were listed monarchial titles of the reigning Lithuanian monarch at the time and in the centre featured the Coat of arms of Lithuania with Gediminas's Cap above it. The Lesser Seal of Lithuania was much smaller in diameter than the Great Seal of Lithuania and unlike the Great Seal of Lithuania did not feature the coats of arms of voivodeships, Columns of Gediminas, etc. Historically the Lesser Seals of Lithuania were attached to documents with ligaments which were anchored in the wax of the shell of the seal, however frequently the ligaments were also fixated between the colored wax seal and the shell.

An early versions of the Lesser Seal of Lithuania dating to the beginning of the early modern period were preserved. For example, a 1505 version of the Lesser Seal of Lithuania which was used during the reign of the Lithuanian Grand Duke Alexander Jagiellon and 1528 version of the Lesser Seal of Lithuania from the reign of the Lithuanian Grand Duke Sigismund I the Old.

In the Lesser Seal of Lithuania used during the reign of Stanisław August Poniatowski (1764–1795) the Coat of arms of Lithuania located in the centre was held by two soldiers wearing Roman clothes and holding two shields decorated with the Ciołek coat of arms and monogram SAR (meaning Stanislaus Augustus Rex). A small crowned Coat of arms of Poland was also featured at the top of the Poniatowski's reign seal.
