= Viršuliškės =

- Eldership
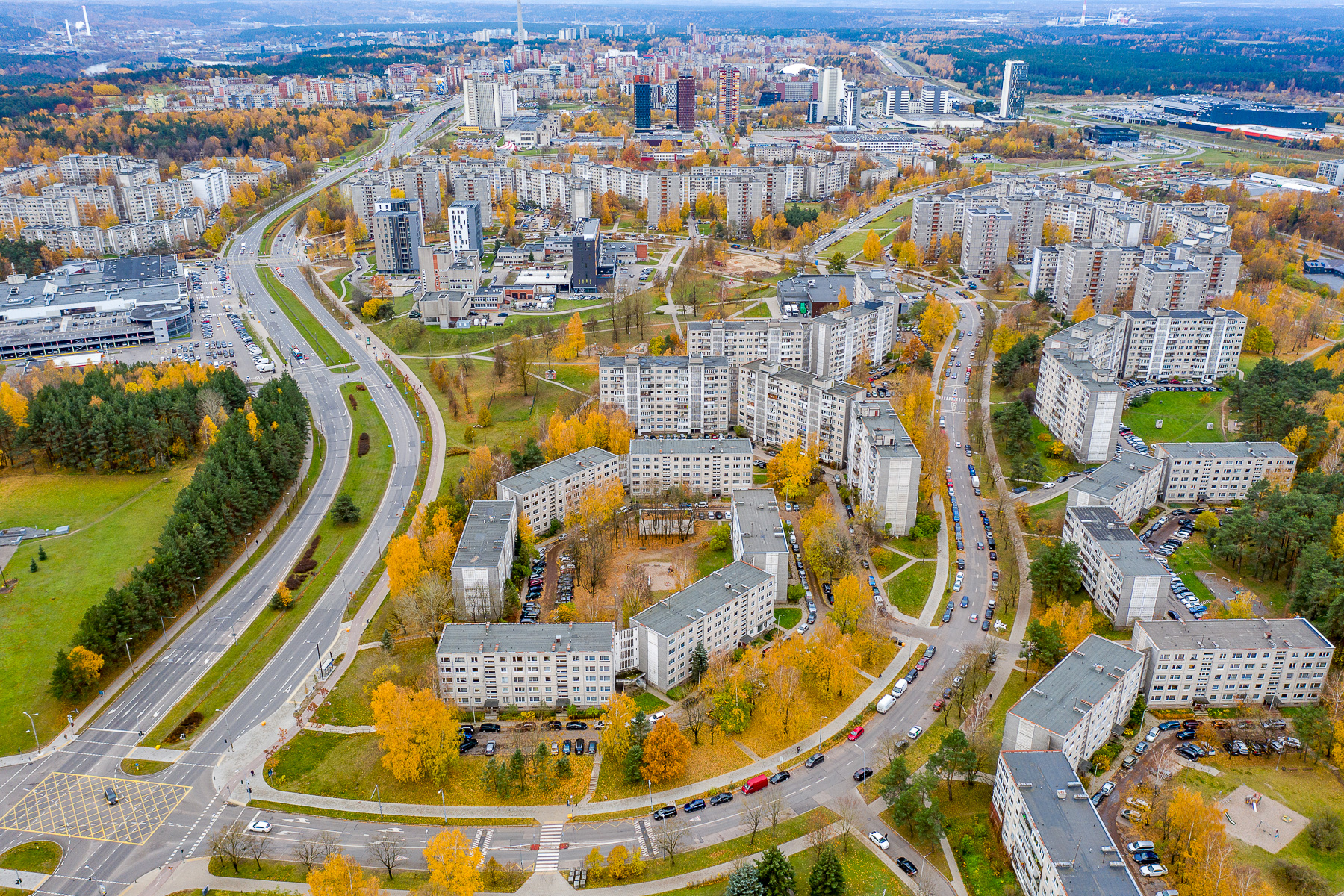

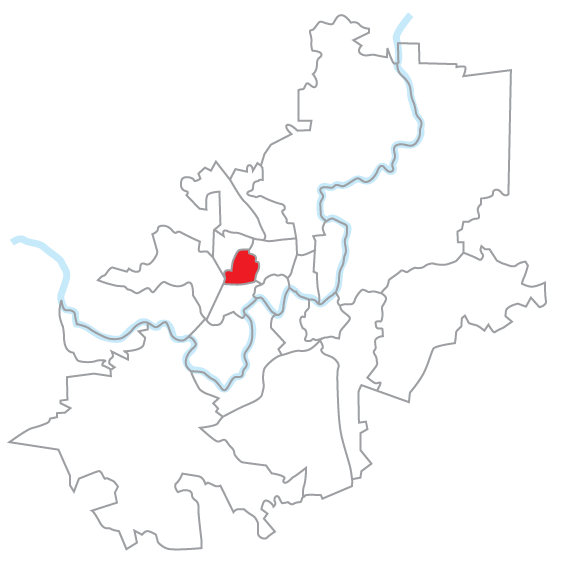
- Location in Vilnius

- Location within Lithuania
- Country: Lithuania
- County: Vilnius County
- Municipality: Vilnius city municipality

Area
  - Total: 2.6 km^{2} (1.0 sq mi)

Population (2021)
  - Total: 13,877
  - Density: 5,300/km^{2} (14,000/sq mi)
- Time zone: UTC+2 (EET)
  - Summer (DST): UTC+3 (EEST)

Viršuliškės is an eldership in the Vilnius city municipality, Lithuania. It occupies 2,6 km^{2}. According to the 2011 census, it has a population of 14,733.

== History ==
Before the neighborhood was incorporated into Vilnius city municipality in 1969, it was a small settlement. After the incorporation, in 1977, new residents started to move here to the newly built multistorey Soviet apartment blocks.

There is a Tarptautinė teisės ir verslo aukštoji mokykla (TTVAM).
