= International School of Law and Business =

Higher education institution in Vilnius, Lithuania

Coordinates: 54°42′00″N 25°13′17″E

- Tarptautinė teisės ir verslo aukštoji mokykla
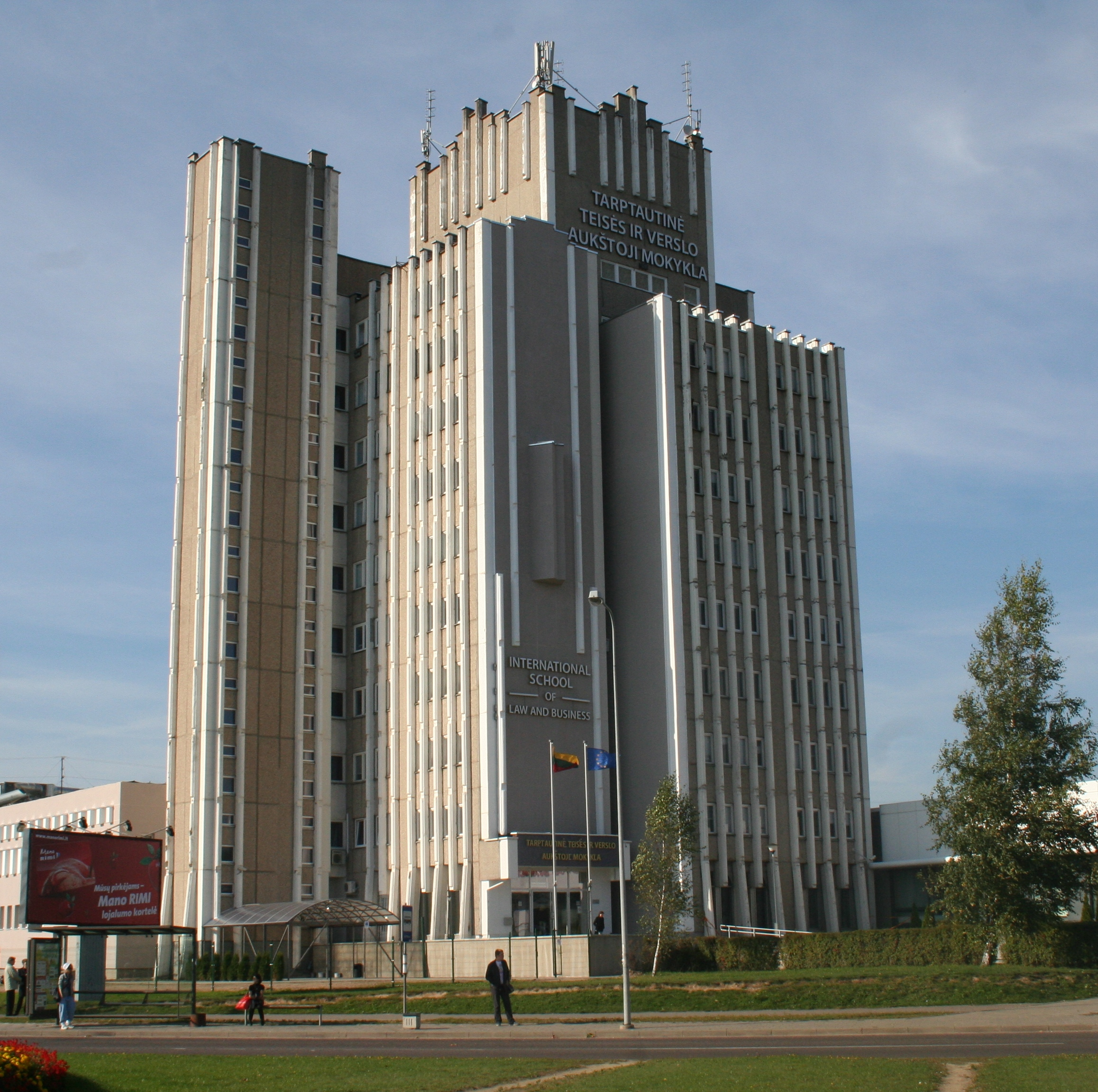
- Former names: Daugvilienės aukštesnioji verslo mokykla (1998–2001); Vilniaus teisės ir verslo kolegija (2001–2009); Tarptautinė teisės ir verslo aukštoji mokykla (2009–2025)
- Type: Private college
- Established: June 23, 1998; 27 years ago
- Accreditation: none
- Students: 134 (2023–24)
- Location: Vilnius, Lithuania
- Website: TTVAM.lt

Homo infinitum, formerly known as the International School of Law and Business (ISLB, Lithuanian: Tarptautinė teisės ir verslo aukštoji mokykla or TTVAM) is a former private college in Vilnius (Laisvės prospektas 58, Viršuliškės), Lithuania. The ISLB closed down in July 2024, and subsequently lost its accreditation in 2025.

ISLB was founded on September 1, 1998, as Daugvilienė Business High School (Daugvilienės aukštesnioji verslo mokykla) and 2001 as the Vilnius Law and Business College (Vilniaus teisės ir verslo kolegija). Director was Daiva Daugvilienė.

== See also ==
- List of universities and colleges in Lithuania
