= Kurier Litewski =

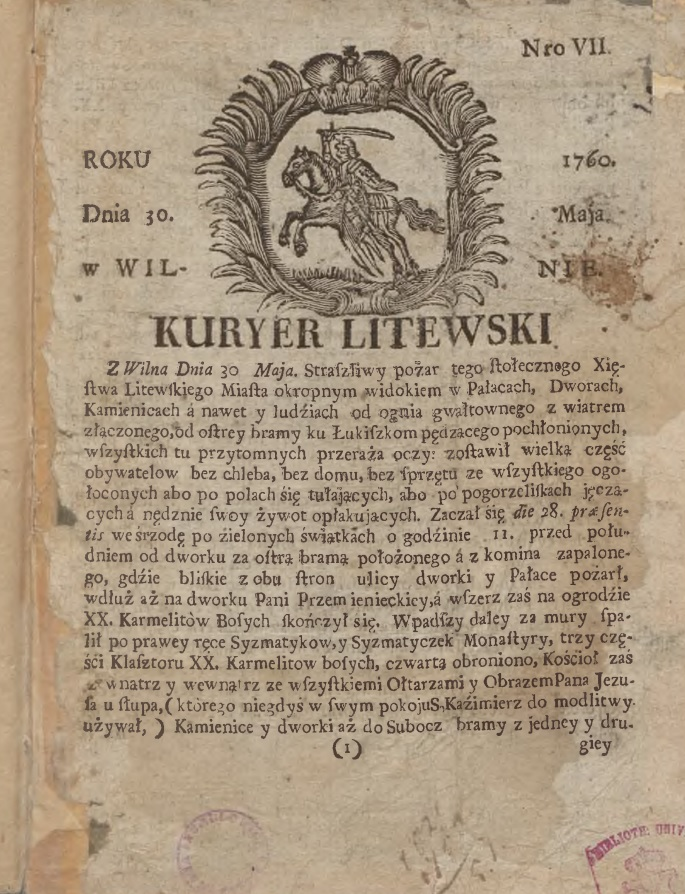
Title page of Kurier Litewski newspaper (1760, Vilnius)

Kurier Litewski (Lithuanian Courier; Lithuanian: Lietuvos kurjeris) was the first periodical newspaper (weekly) published in the Grand Duchy of Lithuania. It was published in Polish and later, after the partitions of the Polish-Lithuanian Commonwealth, also Russian, in Vilnius from 19 April 1760 to 19 August 1763 by the Academy of Vilnius. After the suppression of the Society of Jesus in the Commonwealth in 1773, the newspaper passed into private hands and was published until 1915 under different names. The newspaper retained the word Litewski (Lithuanian) in its name until 1840, despite dissolution of the Grand Duchy of Lithuania and the Commonwealth in 1795.

The newspaper wrote about the political life of the Commonwealth and other countries and published news about Vilnius culture, science and medicine, and included the supplements Wiadomości Literackie (1760–63), Wiadomości Cudzoziemskie (1760–63, initially was called Wiadomości Uprzywilejowane) and Suplement do Gazet Wileńskich (1761–63).

== History ==
Initially, a total of 34 issues appeared of Kurier Litewski, which was prepared for release by Jesuits. At the time, it was the only periodical to be granted royal privilege to print. Its editors at that time were Jesuit priests Franciszek Paprocki and Aleksander Januszkiewicz.

After the closure of the Jesuit Order in 1773, the Kurier Litewski passed into private hands, and in 1789 the publishing of this newspaper came to a complete halt. After a seven-year hiatus, the newspaper was published again. From 1796 onwards, it was published twice a week in Grodno, until it moved back to Vilnius the following year. Until 1834, it was issued only in Polish, but from 1834, following the ongoing Russification campaign in the Russian partition, it was issued in two languages – Polish and Russian. In 1840, the newspaper's name was changed: the Polish variant was renamed to Kurier Wileński (Vilnius Courier) and the Russian variant to Vilenskij Vestnik (Vilnius Herald). After the 1863 Uprising due to the even stricter Russification policy, the Polish variant was abolished, therefore only the Russian variant Vilensky Vestnik was published until 1915.

== Editors ==
Editors of the initial newspaper were Franciszek Paprocki, A. Januszkiewicz, W. Wiażewicz.
