= Great Seal of Lithuania =

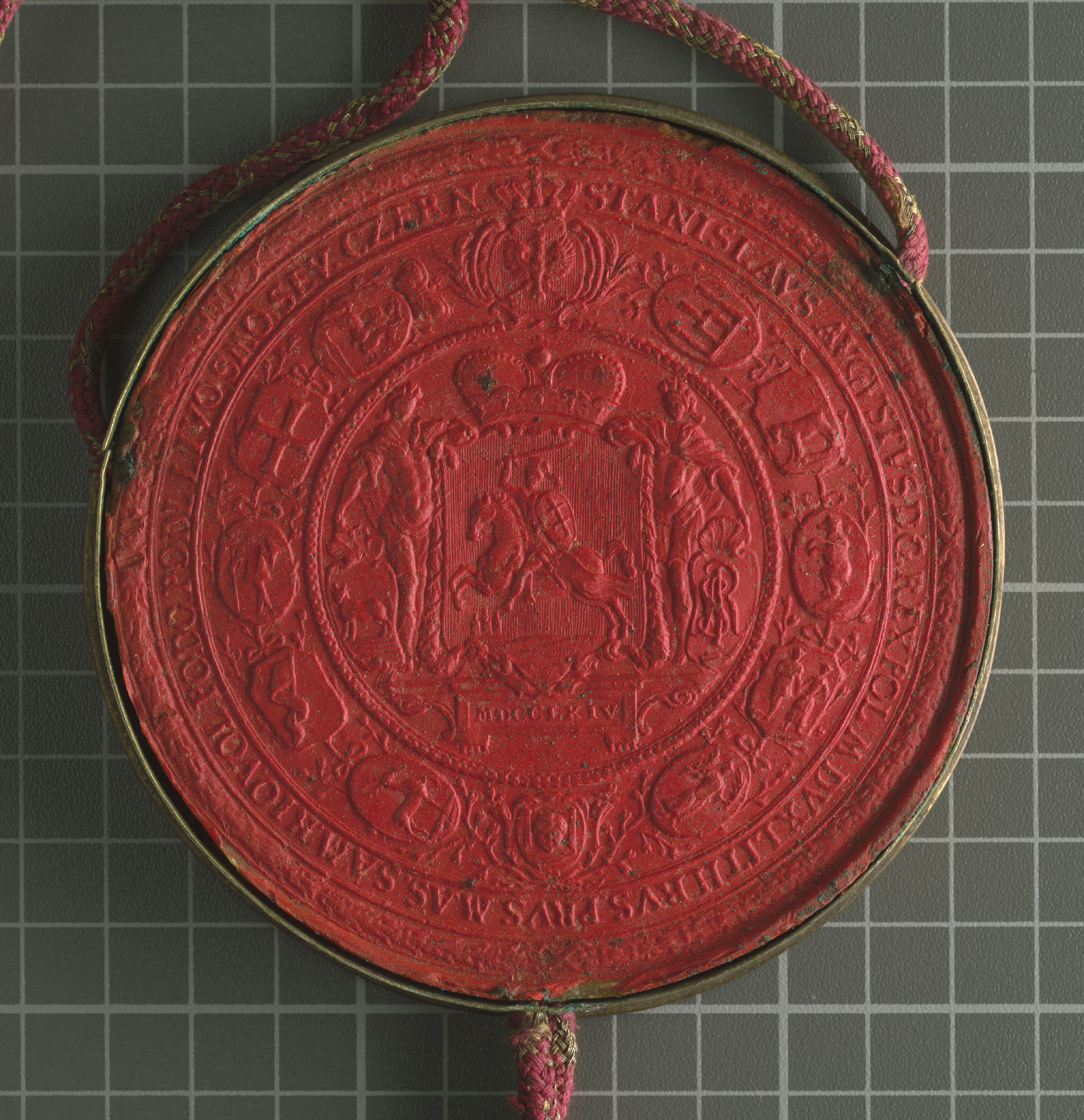
The Great Seal of Lithuania, which was used during the reign of Stanisław August Poniatowski, 1764.

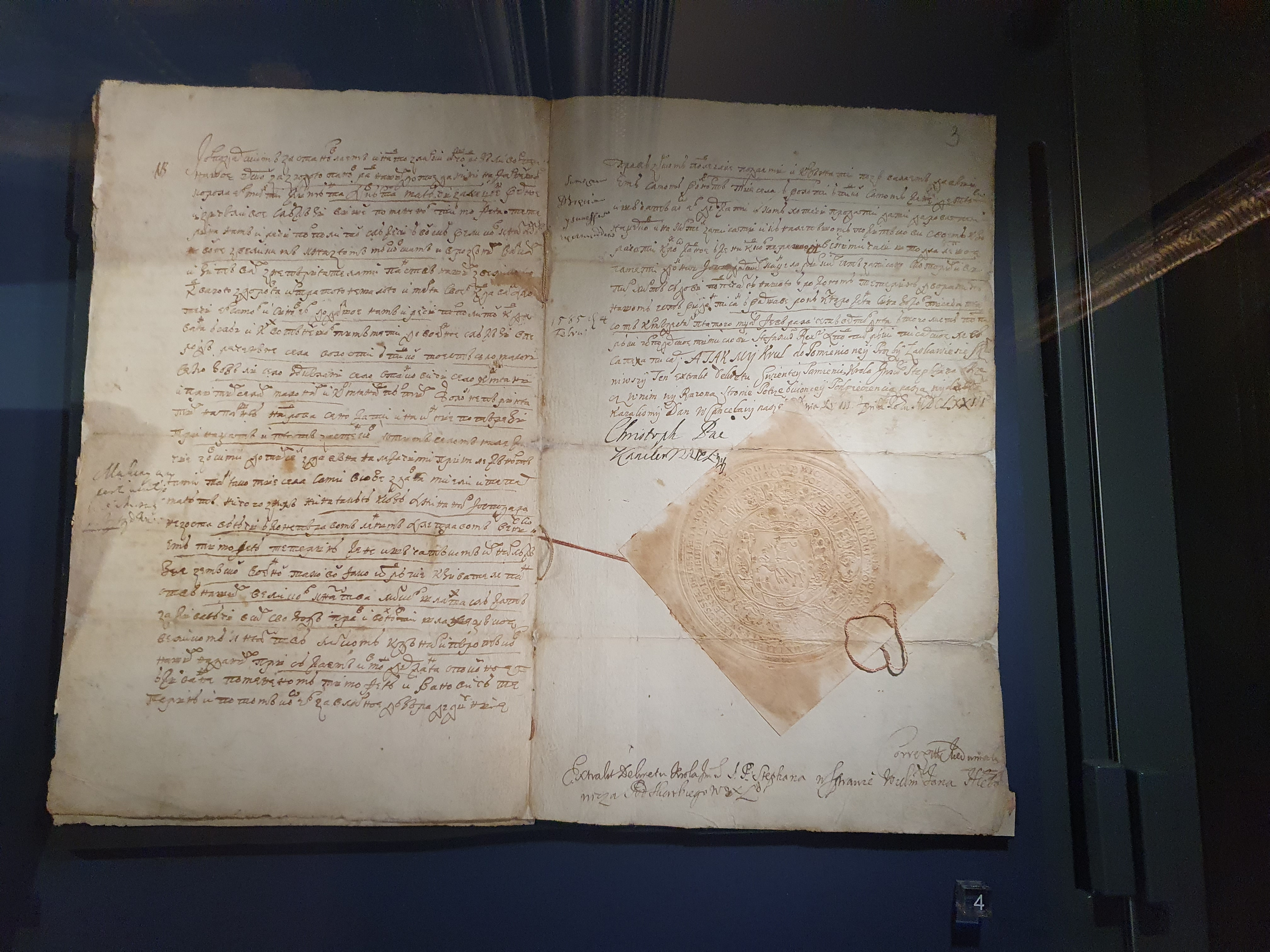
A document signed by Lithuanian Grand Chancellor Krzysztof Zygmunt Pac and confirmed with the Great Seal of Lithuania

The Great Seal of Lithuania (Lithuanian: Lietuvos didysis antspaudas; Polish: pieczęć wielka litewska) was a state seal (sigillum regni) with a full legal force (sigillum authenticum) of the Grand Duchy of Lithuania and the Polish–Lithuanian Commonwealth. The Great Lithuanian Seal functioned since 16th century until 1795 and the fall of the state.

The seal was held in the custody of the Lithuanian chancellor; only he was permitted to use it, and he was not allowed to make it available to anyone else. Vice-chancellor held Lesser Seal of Lithuania. Both the chancellor and the vice-chancellor were regarded as guardians of the laws. They could not seal documents without the ruler’s consent, but they were obliged to refuse to affix the Lithuanian seals to any documents that would violate the laws or act to the detriment of the state. Without the affixing of a Lithuanian seal, such documents were invalid in Lithuania.

The seal was associated with the person of the ruler. Upon the monarch’s death, the chancellor broke the seal during the funeral ceremony. During the interregnum, he did not use the seal, as his authority was suspended. A new seal was made after the election of a new ruler. In the event of the chancellor’s death, his family returned the seal to the king.

After concluding the Union of Lublin in 1569 which established the Polish–Lithuanian Commonwealth, a federative real union state, the Grand Duchy of Lithuania remained a separate state and the Great Seal of Lithuania was preserved, together with a separate territory, central offices, laws, etc. During the period of the union’s conclusion, despite the claims of the Crown chancellery, the practice was established of affixing only the Lithuanian seal to royal documents addressed to the Grand Duchy. In the hierarchy of the state seals of the Polish–Lithuanian Commonwealth, it ranked below the king’s majestic seal, on a par with other state seals: the Great and Lesser Crown Seals as well as the Lesser Lithuanian Seal, and above the ruler’s signet seals. There was no single, unified state seal of the Polish–Lithuanian Commonwealth. Documents confirmed by the great seals were more prestigious.

As a rule, the division of competencies was observed, and acts pertaining solely to the Grand Duchy could be confirmed only with Lithuanian seals. Documents concerning the entire state were sealed by the dignitary who was at the ruler’s side, in accordance with the hierarchy. When the ruler was present in the territory of the Grand Duchy, the Lithuanian chancellor was at a top of it. From 1589, documents addressed to Livonia were to be issued under two seals, the Crown and the Lithuanian, due to the province’s subordination to both the Crown and Lithuania.

For example, Stephen Báthory, a King of Poland and Grand Duke of Lithuania, sought to establish the Vilnius University by granting a privilege to the Jesuits College of Vilnius in 1578, however at the time the Grand Chancellor of Lithuania was Mikołaj Radziwiłł the Red of Reformed Christianity faith who refused to confirm Báthory's privilege, establishing a Catholic university, with the Great Seal of Lithuania, therefore Báthory's another privilege regarding the Vilnius University came into force only in 1579 when the Lithuanian Vice-chancellor Eustachy Wołłowicz confirmed it with the Lesser Seal of Lithuania under pressure of Báthory. Moreover, the resolutions of the Sejm of the Polish–Lithuanian Commonwealth took effect in the Grand Duchy of Lithuania only when they were confirmed by the Grand Chancellor of Lithuania with the Great Seal of Lithuania.

== Design ==
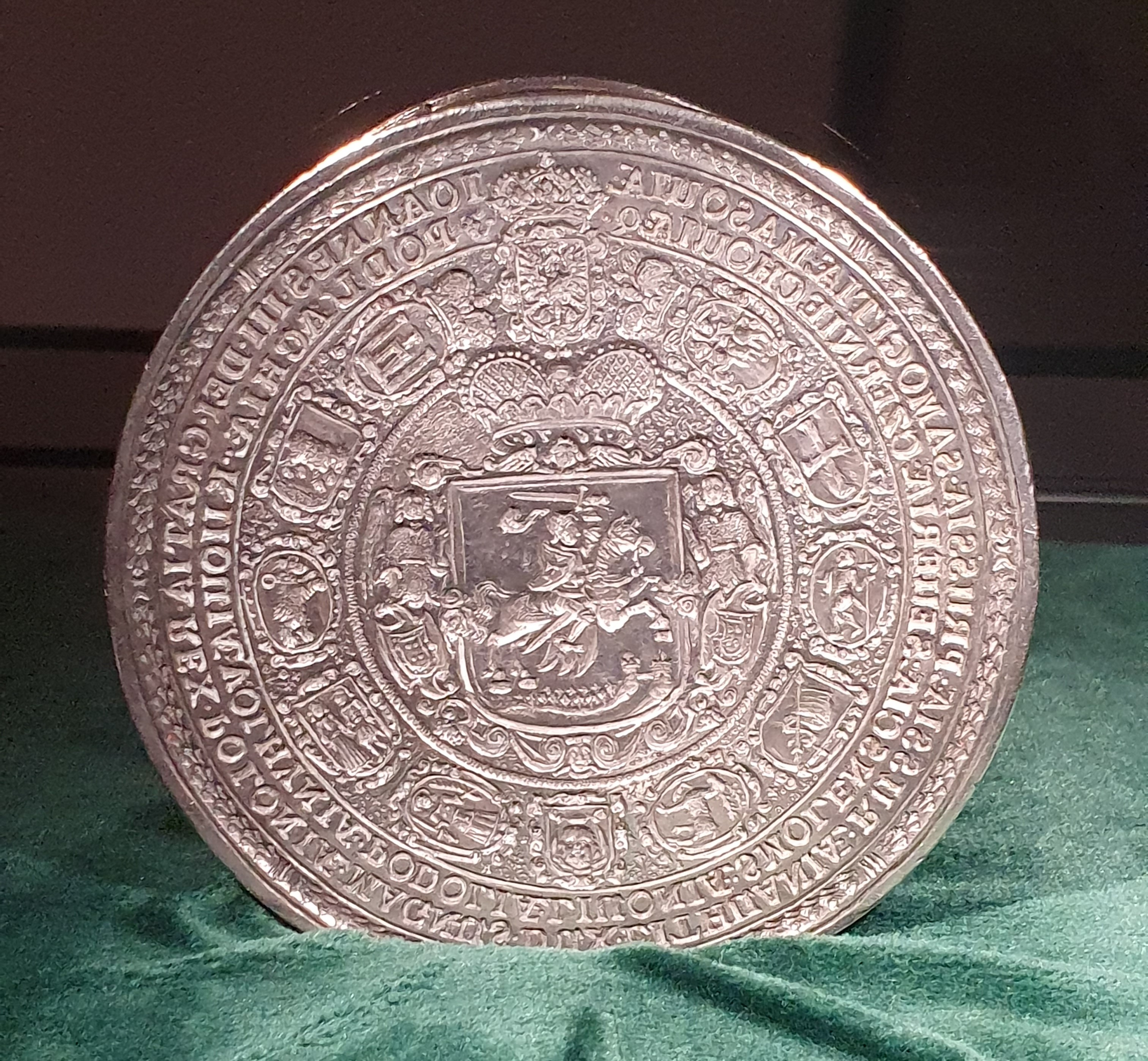
Silver stamp of the Great Seal of Lithuania, used by Lithuanian Grand Chancellor Krzysztof Zygmunt Pac, 1676

In the centre of the Great Seal of Lithuania was depicted the Coat of arms of Lithuania and often Gediminas's Cap above it, while it was surrounded by coats of arms of the most important lands of the Grand Duchy of Lithuania and later also Columns of Gediminas. The coat of arms of the Grand Chancellor of Lithuania became a significant element of the Great Seal of Lithuania at the turn of the 17th and 18th centuries.

The pre-1581 version of the Great Seal of Lithuania during the reign of Stephen Báthory contained innacuracies (e.g. it included the coat of arms of the House of Sforza, despite the fact that the new monarch Stephen Báthory was from the Báthory family), therefore its design was possibly based on the earlier Great Seals of Lithuania used during the reign of Sigismund II Augustus (son of Bona Sforza) or Sigismund I the Old, therefore a new design of the Great Seal of Lithuania was ordered in 1581. The updated 1581 Great Seal of Lithuania featured the Coat of arms of Poland above the Coat of arms of Lithuania (which was depicted the largest in the centre of the seal) and the coat of arms of the Báthory family in the upper right side, however in the upper left side was depicted the Columns of Gediminas despite the fact that Stephen Báthory was not from the Gediminids dynasty, unlike earlier Lithuanian monarchs Sigismund II Augustus, Sigismund I the Old.

During the reign of Sigismund III Vasa the outer and inner circles of the 1588–1621 version of the Great Seal of Lithuania featured monarchial titles of Sigismund III Vasa in Latin language (e.g. King of Poland, Grand Duke of Lithuania, King of Sweden, etc.). The center of the 1588–1621 Great Seal of Lithuania featured images of the Gediminas's Cap above the Coat of arms of Lithuania and was surrounded by twelve coats of arms: coat of arms of the House of Vasa, eagle, coat of arms of the Vilnius Voivodeship (a variant of the Lithuanian Chase / Vytis), Columns of Gediminas, coat of arms of the Duchy of Samogitia, coat of arms of the land of Siewierz, and coats of arms of other voivodeships of the Polish–Lithuanian Commonwealth: Kiev Voivodeship, Podolia Voivodeship, Lublin Voivodeship, Smolensk Voivodeship, Trakai Voivodeship, Volhynian Voivodeship. The updated 1622–1632 version of the Great Seal of Lithuania featured slightly changed text describing the monarchial titles of Sigismund III Vasa, but in the centre had the same twelve coats of arms surrounding the Coat of arms of Lithuania with the Gediminas's Cap above it. In comparison, the 1588–1618 and 1618–1632 versions of the Lesser Seal of Lithuania in the outer and inner circles had included fewer monarchial titles of Sigismund III Vasa (e.g. excluded Swedish King title) and in the centre was depicted the Coat of arms of Lithuania with Gediminas's Cap above it, however surrounding it there were no coats of arms of voivodeships, Columns of Gediminas, etc.

== Gallery ==
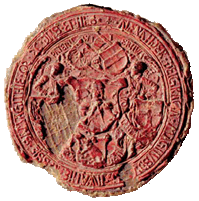
The Great Seal of Lithuania, which was used during the reign of Alexander Jagiellon, 1503.

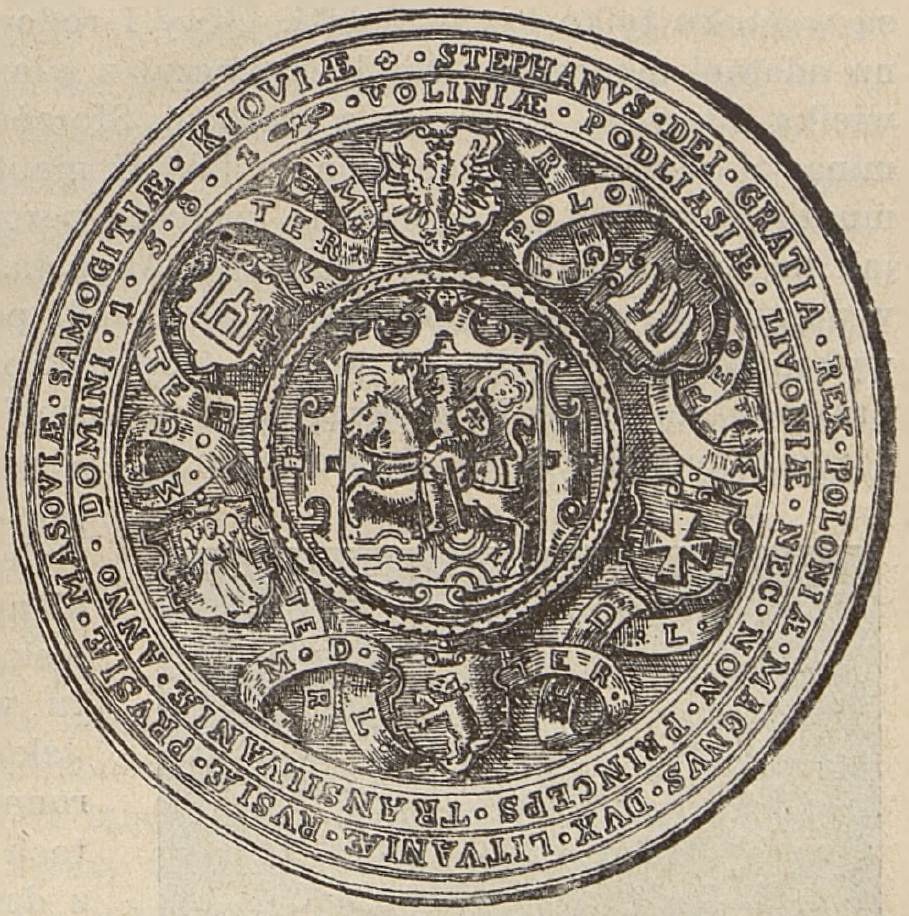
The Great Seal of Lithuania, which was used during the reign of Stephen Báthory, 1581.

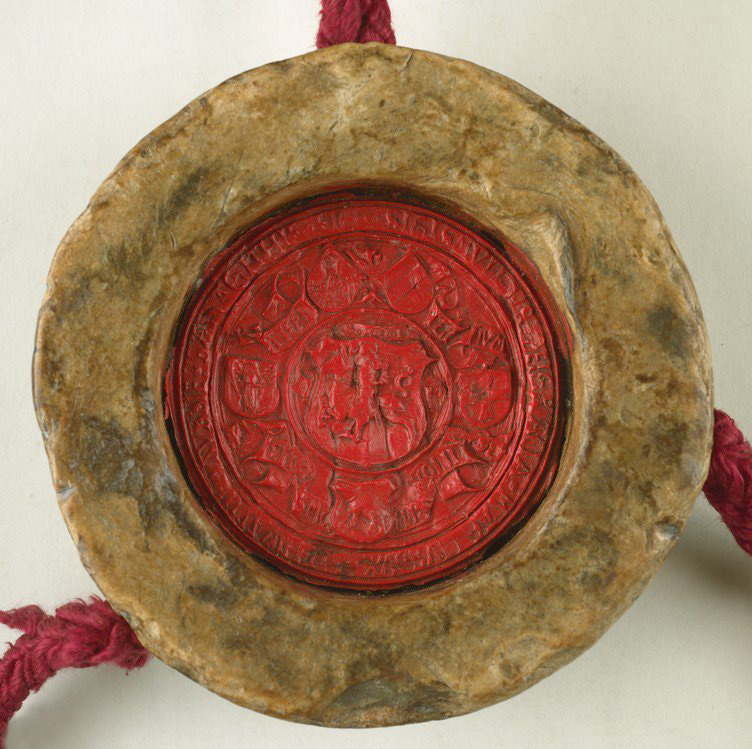
The Great Seal of Lithuania, which was used during the reign of Sigismund I the Old, 1529.

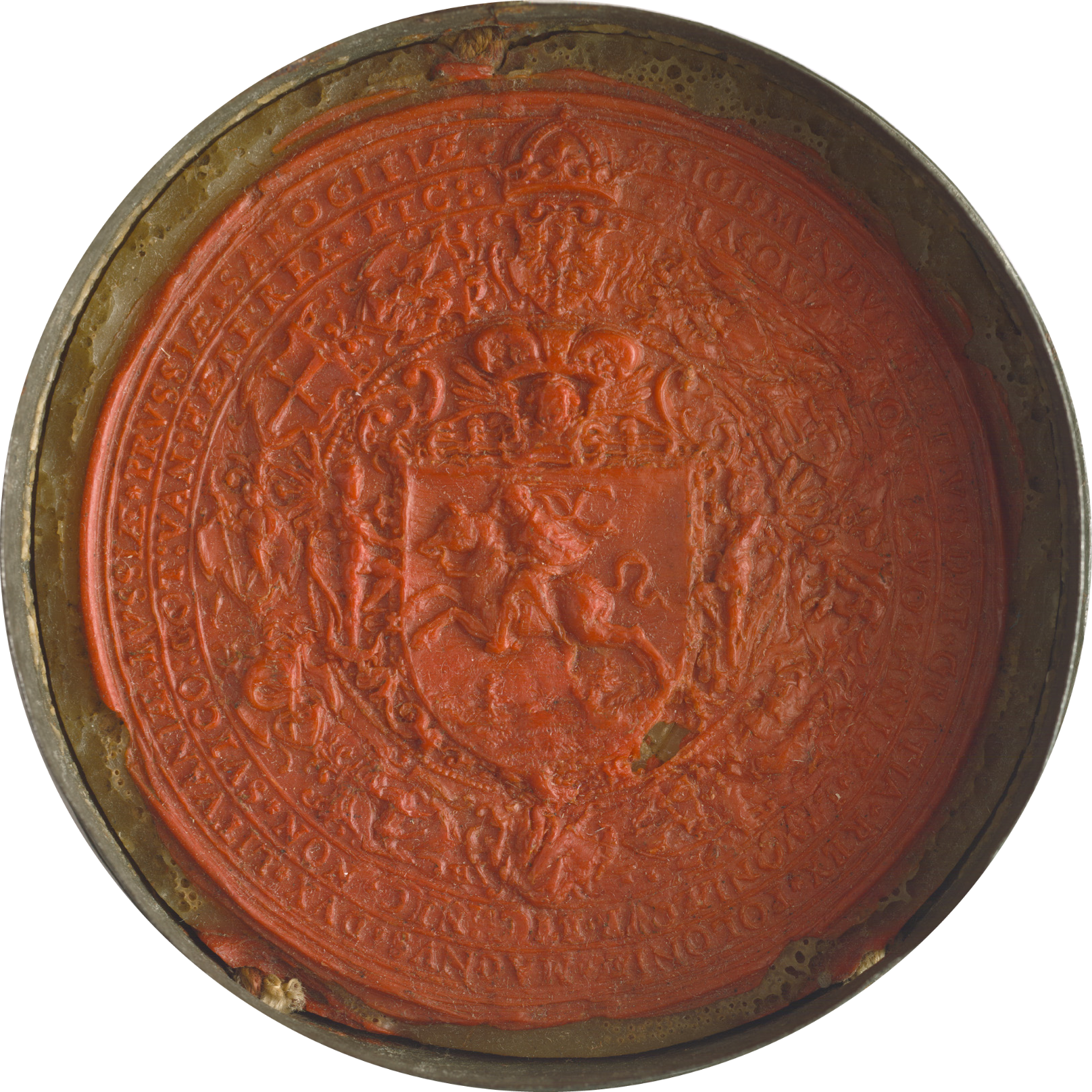
The Great Seal of Lithuania, which was used during the reign of Sigismund III Vasa, 1623.

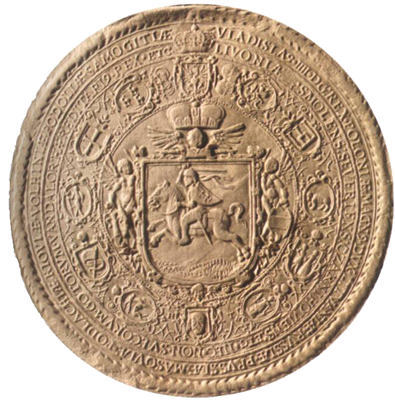
The Great Seal of Lithuania, which was used during the reign of Władysław IV Vasa, circa 1635–1648.

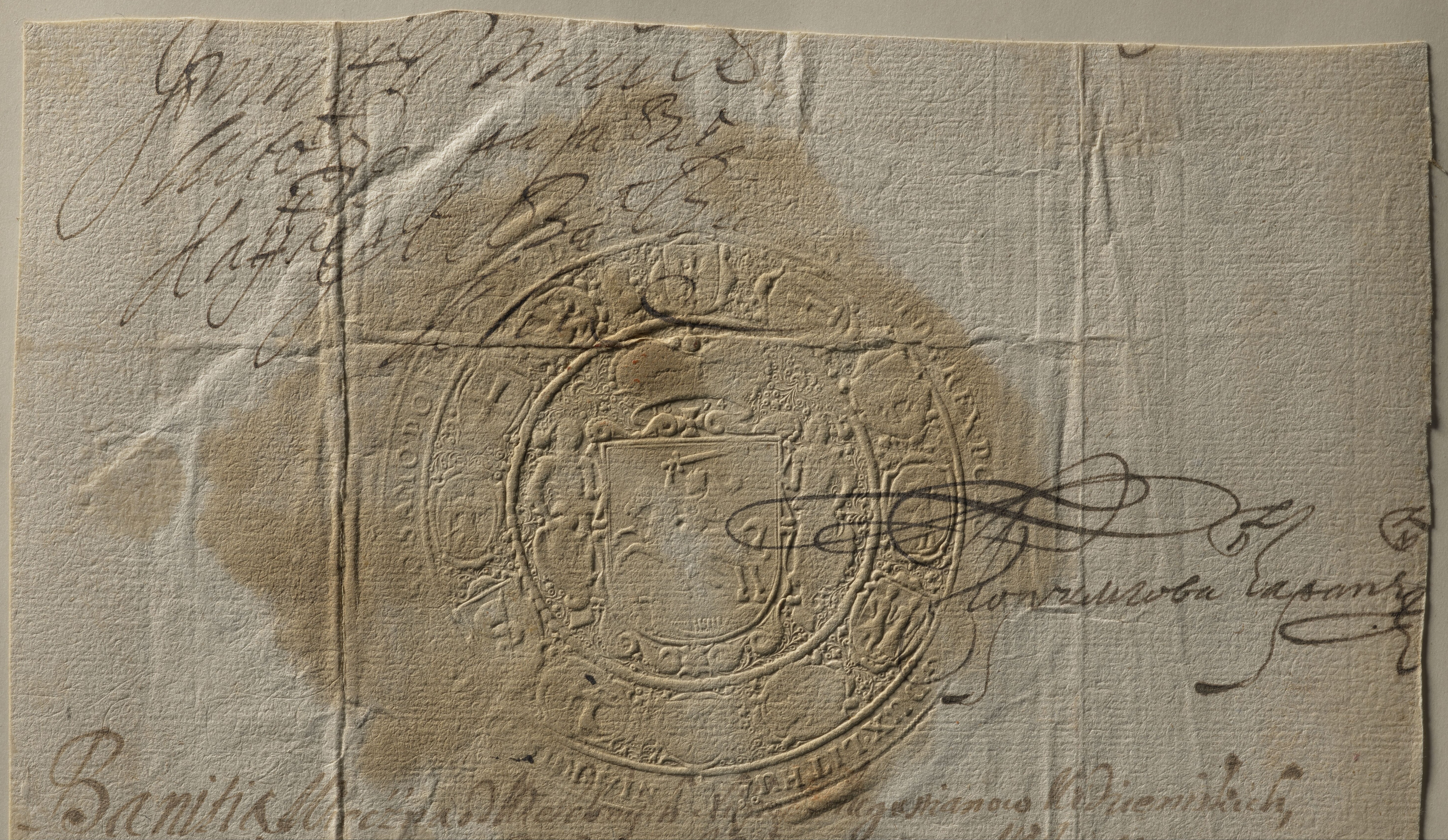
The Great Seal of Lithuania, which was used during the reign of John III Sobieski, circa 1674–1696.

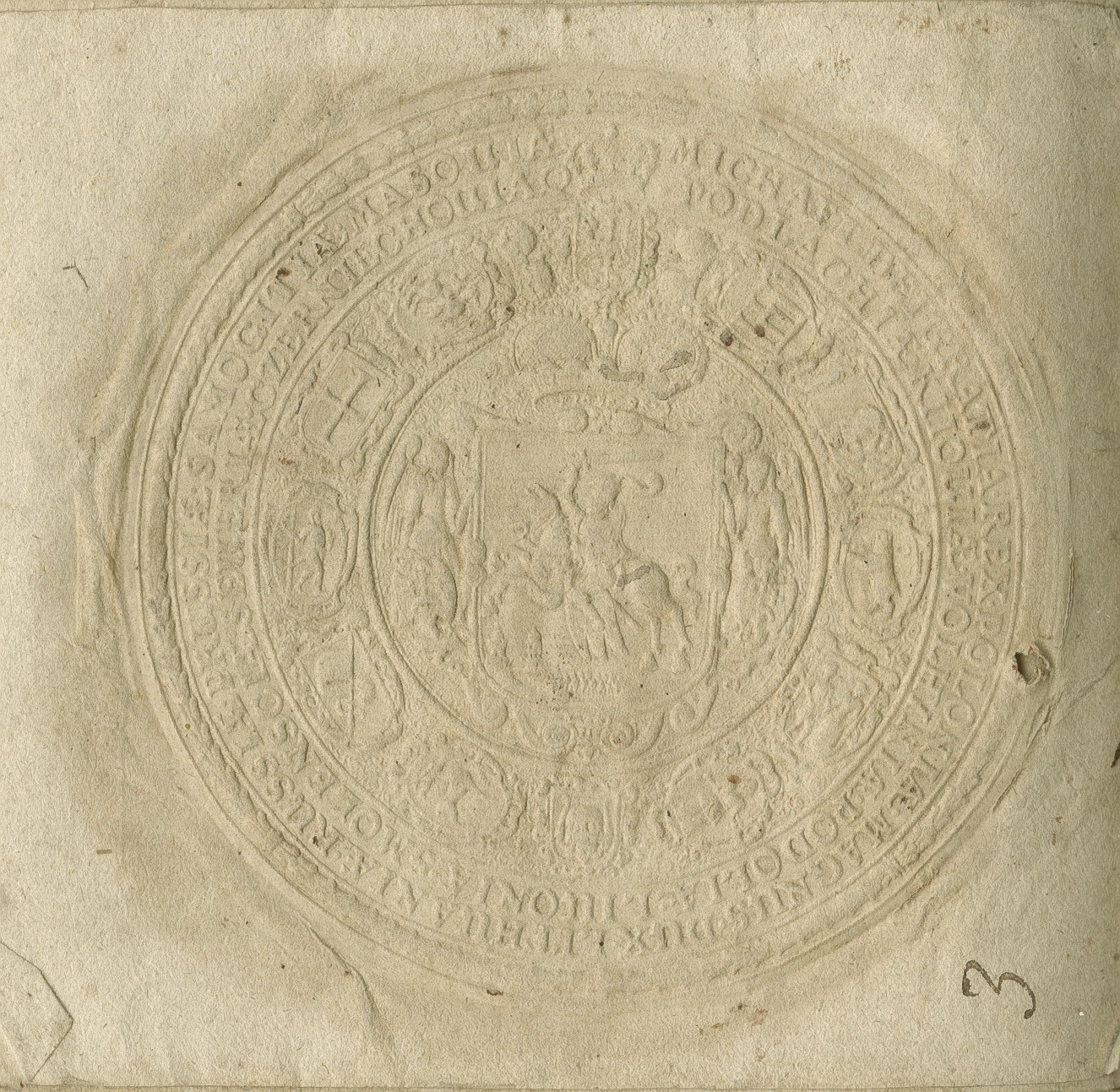
The Great Seal of Lithuania, which was used during the reign of Michał Korybut Wiśniowiecki, circa 1669–1673.

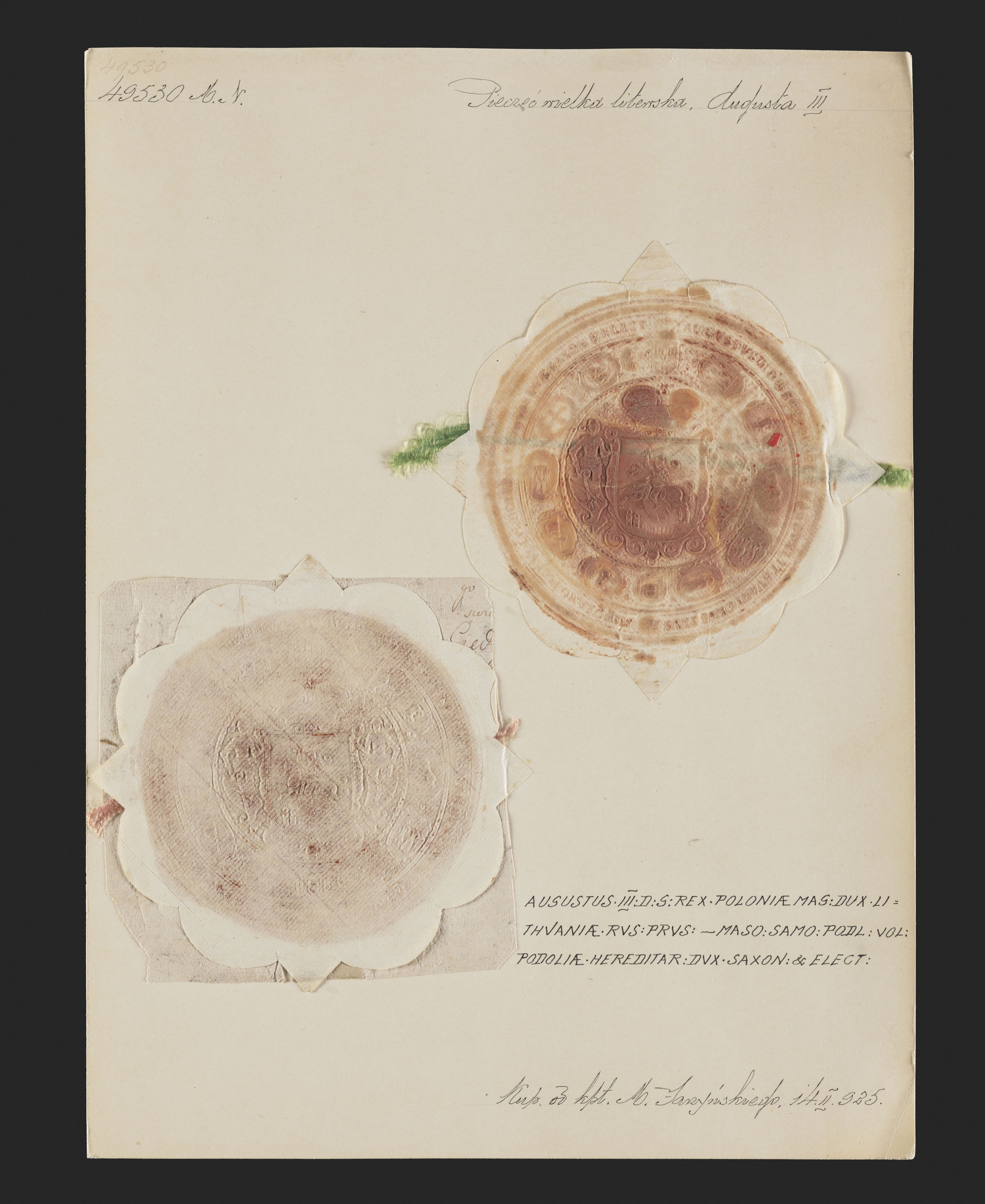
Great Seals of Lithuania, which were used during the reign of Augustus III, circa 1733–1763.

== Bibliography ==
- Góralski, Zbigniew (1988). Urzędy i godności w dawnej Polsce [Offices and dignities in ancient Poland] (in Polish).
- Wisner, Henryk (2008). Rzeczpospolita Wazów. Sławne Państwo, Wielkie Księstwo Litewskie [The Commonwealth of the Vasas. The Illustrious State, the Grand Duchy of Lithuania] (in Polish). Vol. 3. Warsaw: Neriton.
