= Lithuania Business University of Applied Sciences =

Private college in Klaipėda and Vilnius, Lithuania

Coordinates: 55.7094°N 21.1354°E

Lithuania Business College
- Lietuvos verslo kolegija
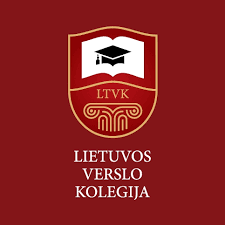
- Established: 1994; 32 years ago
- Location: Klaipėda / Vilnius, Lithuania
- Website: www.ltvk.lt

Lithuania Business College (Lithuanian: Lietuvos verslo kolegija, LTVK) is a private college located in Klaipėda and Vilnius, Lithuania. The higher education institution was established in 1994. Lithuania Business College offers undergraduate courses.

== History ==
In 1994, the School for Speakers was founded by Dr. Angelė Lileikienė and Dr. Genovaitė Avižonienė. At that time there were 35 students. In 1995, the school was authorized for higher education. 1997 saw the first graduating class. In 1998, the branch in Šiauliai was founded. In August 2001, the school became a university. Later it was called Western Lithuania Business College (Vakarų Lietuvos verslo kolegija).

In 2010, the vocational bachelor's programs were conducted in nine study programs: Law, Business Administration, Economics, Commercial Management, Office and Business Administration, Applied Informatics, Business Management for Recreation and Tourism, Construction Business Management and Accounting.
