= Vilnius College of Technologies and Design =

Lithuanian state institution of higher education

Coordinates: 54°42′22″N 25°18′39″E

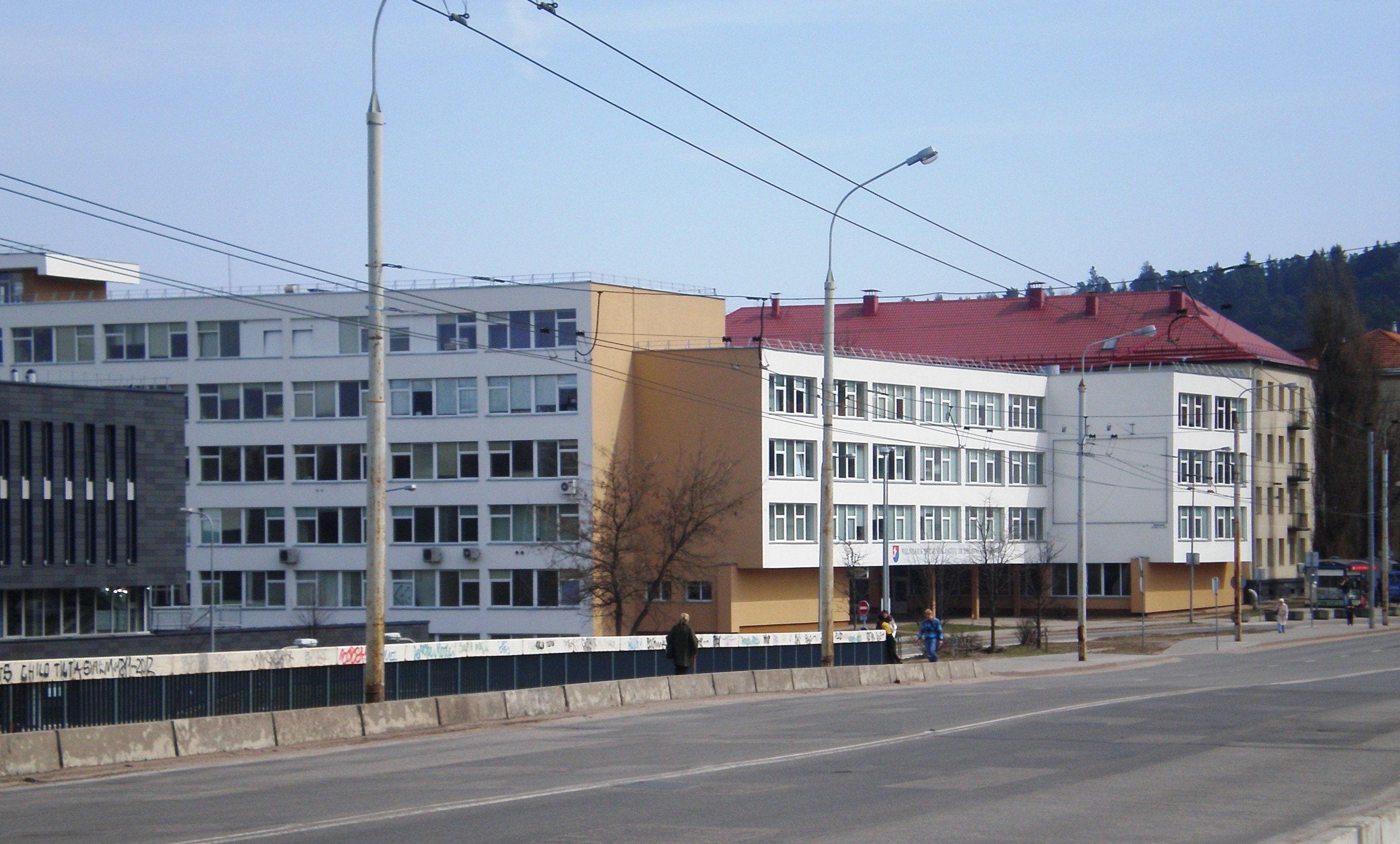

Vilnius College of Technologies and Design (Lithuanian: Vilniaus technologijų ir dizaino kolegija) or VTDK is a Lithuanian state institution of higher education in Vilnius, Antakalnis.

VTDK is one of the largest universities of applied sciences in Lithuania, with approximately 2,000 students and 200 professors.

== History ==
The college was established in 1954 (72 years ago). In 2008 (18 years ago), the Vilnius Technical College (Lithuanian: Vilniaus statybos technikumas) merged with the Vilnius College of Construction and Design (Lithuanian: Vilniaus statybos ir dizaino kolegija), creating VTDK.

== Overview ==
VTDK consists of three faculties: the Civil Engineering Faculty, the Technical Faculty and the Design Faculty. The college offers 15 full-time study programs, partial studies through exchange programs, as well as informal study courses and training.

VTDK maintains close cooperation with many Lithuanian and foreign partners, takes part in various international projects, and is a member of the Universities of Applied Sciences network (UASnet) and the European Association of Institutions in Higher Education (EURASCHE).

== Study programs ==
VTDK offers 15 full-time study programs, partial studies through exchange programs, as well as informal study courses and training. Program duration is 3 years (6 semesters) and students receive a professional bachelor's degree upon graduation.

=== Civil Engineering Faculty ===
- Engineering Systems of Buildings
- Geodesy and Cadastre
- Transport Logistics
- Civil Engineering

=== Technical Faculty ===
- Technical Maintenance of Automobiles
- Electrical and Automation Engineering
- Mechanical Technologies Engineering
- Railway Transport Engineering
- Transport Information Systems
- Renewable Energy
- Car Electronics

=== Design Faculty ===
- Technology of Photography
- Multimedia Design
- Graphic Design
- Interior Design

== Facilities ==
VTDK has the following facilities:

- 50 laboratories
- 9 libraries
- 5 drawing rooms
- The TOYOTA technical training center
- The language learning center
- The distance learning center
- Sport facilities
- Dormitories
