= Laukininkas =

A laukininkas (plural: laukininkai) was a free peasant in the early Grand Duchy of Lithuania. Laukininkai formed the majority of the Grand Duchy's population. They formed communities, called laukas (in modern Lithuanian the term means field). The term was later replaced by volosts (Lithuanian: valsčius) and subsequently laukininkas became known as valstietis, which is a modern Lithuanian term for farmers and peasants.

== History ==
In ancient times, when tools were crude and a single family could not support itself, the land was owned and worked by egalitarian communities. In the 12th century tools improved and more efficient techniques were adopted; increased harvest meant that individual families could sustain themselves. This facilitated transition from the community-based to family-based agriculture. By early 13th century the land was divided into individual lots that were owned and cultivated by a single family of laukininkai. The lots were inherited from one generation to the other (allodial title, known in Lithuanian as alodas). The community continued to own forests, meadows, rivers and lakes. Private ownership allowed stratification into early social classes and division of labor. Wealthier families could acquire dependent people – kaimynas or šeimynykštis. To maintain such structure in the society an organized state was needed. This need contributed to the formation of the Grand Duchy of Lithuania.

The early laukininkai community, or laukas, was obligated to provide the dukes and their officials with food and other accommodations when they stayed in the vicinity, and to help in building and maintaining castles and defense fortifications. Since the 14th century laukininkai were required to pay regular taxes, known as sidabrinė and dėkla. Sidabrinė was paid in silver and was the main source of revenue for the military. Dėkla was paid in grain, hay and other products. To administer the collection, the state territory was subdivided into volots, governed by a tijūnas, who was appointed to collect the tax and serve as a judge in laukininkai trials and disputes.

In the beginning of the 15th century rising grain prices in Europe prompted bajorai, a class of warriors and future nobility, to shift from warfare into landownership. Grand Duke Vytautas the Great started gifting laukininkai to his trusted followers for military services. Thus some laukininkai became veldamai – a class of peasants, which retained ownership of land, but owed taxes and levies imposed by the nobles. Increasingly rights of veldamai were curtailed by various privileges to the nobility issued by the Grand Dukes. It was a transitional stage between free peasants and serfs, fully established by the Wallach reform in 1557. After the reform all peasants lost personal freedom and land ownership.
