= Slavery in medieval Europe =

Slavery was widespread in medieval Europe. Europe and North Africa were part of an interconnected trade network across the Mediterranean Sea, and this included slave trading. During the medieval period, wartime captives were commonly forced into slavery. As European kingdoms transitioned to feudal societies, a different legal category of unfree persons – serfdom – began to replace slavery as the main economic and agricultural engine. Throughout medieval Europe, the perspectives and societal roles of enslaved peoples differed greatly, from some being restricted to agricultural labor to others being positioned as trusted political advisors.

== Early Middle Ages ==
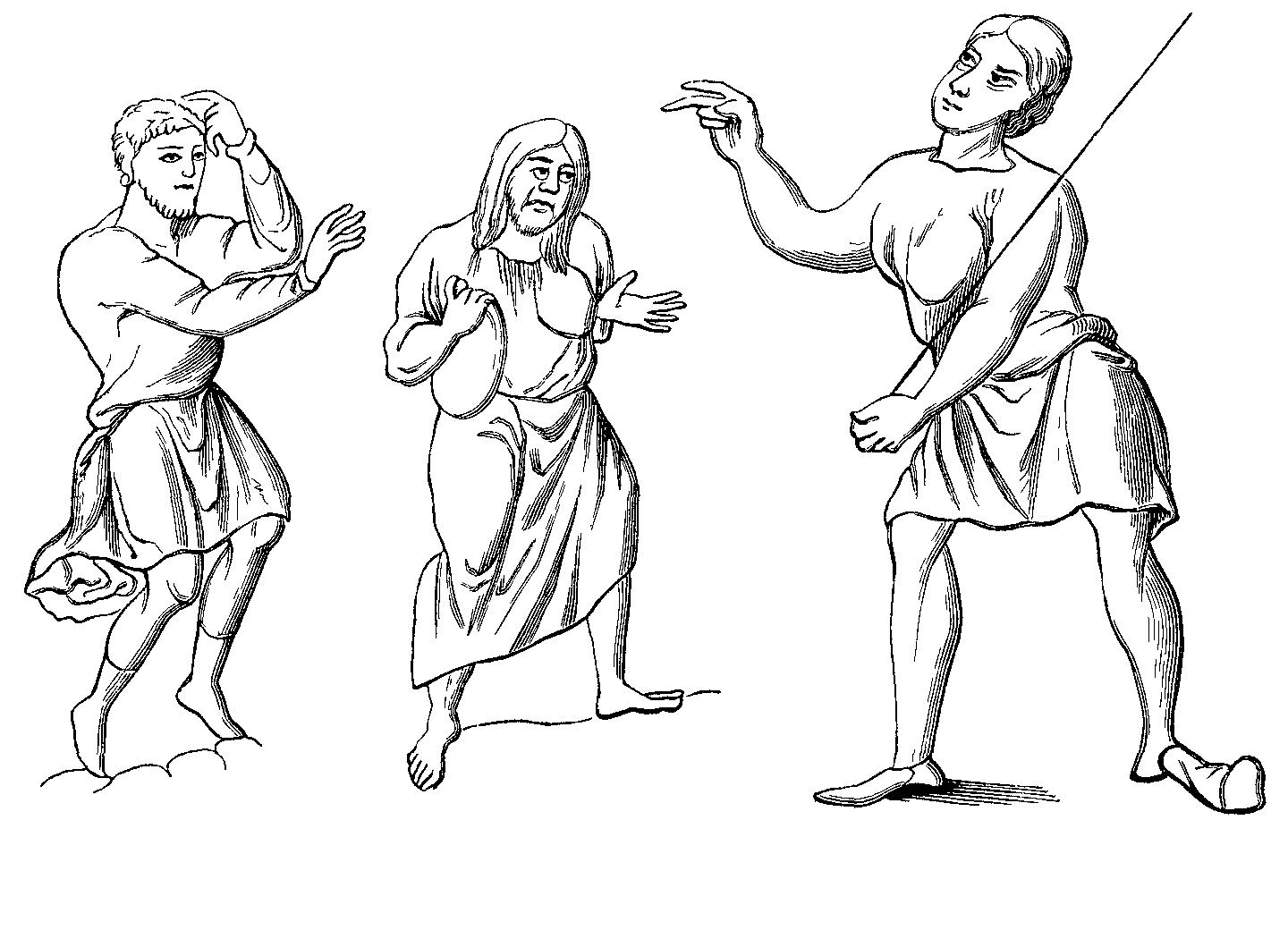
Costumes of slaves or from the sixth to the twelfth centuries

Slavery in the Early Middle Ages (500–1000) was initially a continuation of earlier Roman practices from late antiquity, and was continued by an influx of captives in the wake of the social chaos caused by the barbarian invasions of the Western Roman Empire. With the continuation of Roman legal practices of slavery, new laws and practices concerning slavery spread throughout Europe. For example, the Welsh laws of Hywel the Good included provisions dealing with slaves. In the Germanic realms, laws instituted the enslavement of criminals, such as the Visigothic Code's prescribing enslavement for criminals who could not pay financial penalties for their crimes (Note: Forum judicum) and as an actual punishment for various other crimes. (Note: Forum judicum) Such criminals would become slaves to their victims, often with their property.

As these peoples Christianized, the church worked more actively to reduce the practice of holding coreligionists in bondage. St. Patrick, who himself was captured and enslaved at one time, protested an attack that enslaved newly baptized Christians in his letter to the soldiers of Coroticus. The restoration of order and the growing power of the church slowly transmuted the late Roman slave system of Diocletian into serfdom.

Another major factor was the rise of Bathilde (626–680), queen of the Franks, who had been enslaved before marrying Clovis II. When she became regent, her government outlawed slave-trading of Christians throughout the Merovingian empire. About ten percent of England's population entered in the Domesday Book (1086) were slaves, despite chattel slavery of English Christians being nominally discontinued after the 1066 conquest. It is difficult to be certain about slave numbers, however, since the old Roman word for slave (servus) continued to be applied to unfree people whose status later was reflected by the term serf.

== Slave trade ==
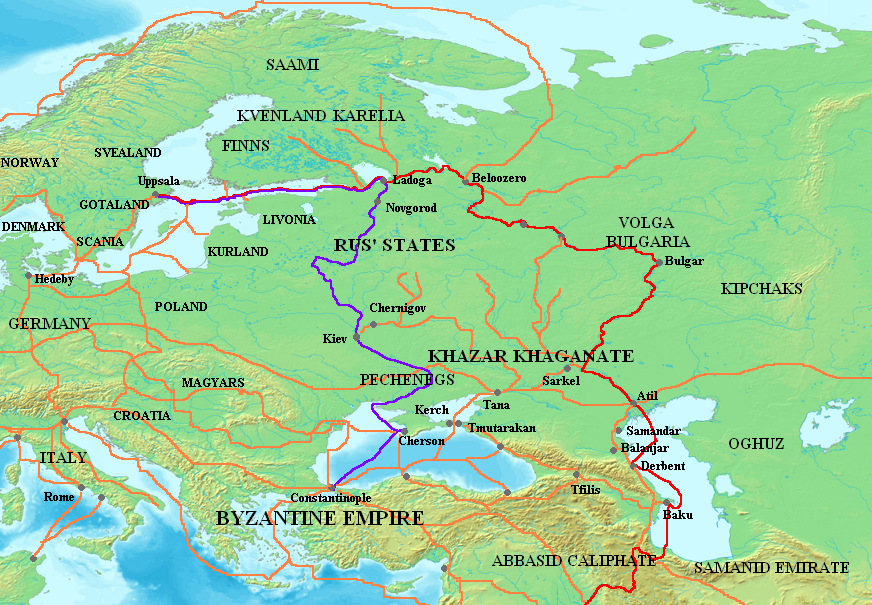
Routes through Slavic territories used for the slave trade: Volga trade route from the Vikings (Varangians) to the Muslim Middle East (red), trade route from the Varangians to the Greeks (Byzantines) (blue) – and other trade routes of the 8th–11th centuries (orange)

Slavery was practiced in various forms in Europe during the Middle Ages, alongside imprisonment, serfdom and other forms of bondage. Slaves were used for agricultural and craft work as well as for domestic and military service. For most of that time, the sale of Christian slaves to non-Christians was banned. In the pactum Lotharii of 840 between Venice and the Carolingian Empire, Venice promised not to buy Christian slaves in the Empire, and not to sell Christian slaves to Muslims. The Church prohibited the export of Christian slaves to non-Christian lands, for example in the Council of Koblenz in 922, the Council of London in 1102, and the Council of Armagh in 1171.

As a result, most Christian slave merchants focused on moving slaves from non-Christian areas to Muslim Spain, North Africa, and the Middle East; and most non-Christian merchants, although not bound by the Church's rules, focused on Muslim markets as well. Arabic silver dirhams, presumably exchanged for slaves, are plentiful in eastern Europe and Southern Sweden, indicating trade routes from Slavic to Muslim territory.

=== Baltic slave trade ===
The Baltics appears to have been a center of slave trade, as well as a slave supply source, already during antiquity.

The role of the Baltics in the European slave trade is more documented during the middle ages. In the middle ages, the Baltics became a religious border zone as one of the last remaining Pagan areas in Christian Europe. This was significant in the context of the slave trade, since both Christians and Muslims banned the enslavement of people of their own religion, but pagans (polytheists) were viewed as legitimate targets of enslavement for sale to Christians, Muslims, and other pagans, which made them the most lucrative choice for slave trade. Up until the Christianization of the Baltics in the 13th century, therefore, the Baltic people were viewed as legitimate targets for surrounding slave traders, such as the Vikings from the West and the Kievan Rus slave trade from the East.

However, the Baltics were not only a victim of slave raids, but also a center of slave trade themselves. When the Norse Vikings became Christian and ended their piracy in the 11th century, they were succeeded by slave-raiding Baltic pagan pirates who attacked the all the coasts of the Baltic Sea, including the now-Christian Sweden and Finland. These Baltic pagans continued the old slave trade route from the Baltic via Daugava to the Black Sea, then via Russian rivers to Central Asia. This became the only remaining slave trade in Europe, since the slave market in Western Europe had died out in the 12th century. In the 13th century, the Latvians reportedly had found the slave trade so lucrative that many used it as their main source of income. The island of Saaremaa was a base for Baltic pirates, who especially sold women captives. In 1226, the pagan Baltic pirates from Saaremaa conducted a slave raid toward now Christian Sweden, where they captured many Swedish women and girls for the slave markets.

The Baltic slave trade ended after subjugation of the eastern Baltic area by the Teutonic order during the 13th century.

=== Prague slave trade ===
The slave market of Prague was one route for saqaliba slaves to al-Andalus. Similarly to al-Andalus, the Duchy of Bohemia was a state in a religious border zone, in the case of Bohemia bordering to Pagan Slavic lands to the North, East and South East.

The Arabic Caliphate of Córdoba referred to the forests of Central and Eastern Europe, which came to function as a slave source supply, as the Bilad as-Saqaliba ("land of the slaves"). Bohemia was in an ideal position to become a supply source for pagan saqaliba slaves to al-Andalus. The slaves were acquired through slave raids toward the pagan Slavic lands north of Prague.

The Prague slave trade adjusted to the al-Andalus market, with females required for sexual slavery and males required for either military slavery or as eunuchs. Male slaves selected to be sold as eunuchs were subjected to castration in Verdun.

Traditionally, the slave traders acquiring the slaves in Prague and transporting them to the slave market of al-Andalus are said to have been dominated by the Jewish Radhanite merchants. How dominating the Jewish merchants were is unknown, but Jewish slave traders did have an advantage toward their non-Jewish colleagues, because they were able to move across Christian and Muslim lands, which was not always to case for Christian and Muslim merchants, and act as mediators between Christian and Muslim commercial markets. While Christians were not allowed to enslave Christians and Muslims not allowed to enslave Muslims, Jews were able to sell Christian slaves to Muslim buyers and Muslim slaves to Christian buyers, as well as pagan slaves to both. In the same fashion, both Christians and Muslims were prohibited from performing castrations, but there was no such ban for Jews, which made it possible for them to meet the demand for eunuchs in the Muslim world.

The slaves were transported to Al-Andalus via France. While the church discouraged the sale of Christian slaves to Muslims, the sale of Pagans to Muslims was not met with such opposition. White European slaves were viewed as luxury goods in Al-Andalus, where they could be sold for as much as 1,000 dinars, a substantial price. The slaves were not always destined for the al-Andalus market; similar to Bohemia in Europe, al-Andalus was a religious border state for the Muslim world, and saqaliba slaves were exported from there further to the Muslim world in the Middle East.

The saqaliba slave trade from Prague to al-Andalus via France became defunct in the 11th century, when the pagan Slavs of the north started to gradually adopt Christianity from the late 10th century, which prohibited Christian Bohemia from enslaving them to sell to Muslim al-Andalus.

=== Italian merchants ===
By the reign of Pope Zachary (741–752), Venice had established a thriving slave trade, enslaving people in Italy, among other places, and selling them to the Moors in North Africa (Zacharias himself reportedly forbade such traffic out of Rome). When the sale of Christians to Muslims was banned (pactum Lotharii), the Venetian slave traders began to sell Slavs and other Eastern European non-Christian slaves in greater numbers via the Balkan slave trade. Caravans of slaves traveled from Eastern Europe, via the Prague slave trade through Alpine passes in Austria, to reach Venice. A record of tolls paid in Raffelstetten (903–906), near St. Florian on the Danube, describes such merchants. Some are Slavic themselves, from Bohemia and the Kievan Rus'. They had come from Kiev through Przemyśl, Kraków, Prague, and Bohemia. The same record values female slaves at a tremissa (about 1.5 grams of gold or roughly 1/3 of a Byzantine solidus (nomisma) or Islamic gold dinar) and male slaves, who were more numerous, at a saiga (which is much less). Eunuchs were especially valuable, and "castration houses" arose in Venice, as well as other prominent slave markets, to meet this demand.

Venice was far from the only slave trading hub in Italy. Southern Italy boasted slaves from distant regions, including Greece, Bulgaria, Armenia, and Slavic regions. During the 9th and 10th centuries, Amalfi was a major exporter of slaves to North Africa. Genoa, along with Venice, dominated the trade in the Eastern Mediterranean beginning in the 12th century, and the Venetian slave traders and the Genoese slave traders dominated the Black Sea slave trade beginning in the 13th century. They sold both Baltic and Slavic slaves, as well as Armenians, Circassians, Georgians, Turks and other ethnic groups of the Black Sea and Caucasus, to the Muslim nations of the Middle East. Genoa primarily managed the slave trade from Crimea to Mamluk Egypt, until the 13th century, when increasing Venetian control over the Eastern Mediterranean allowed Venice to dominate that market. Between 1414 and 1423 alone, at least 10,000 slaves were sold in Venice.

=== Iberia ===
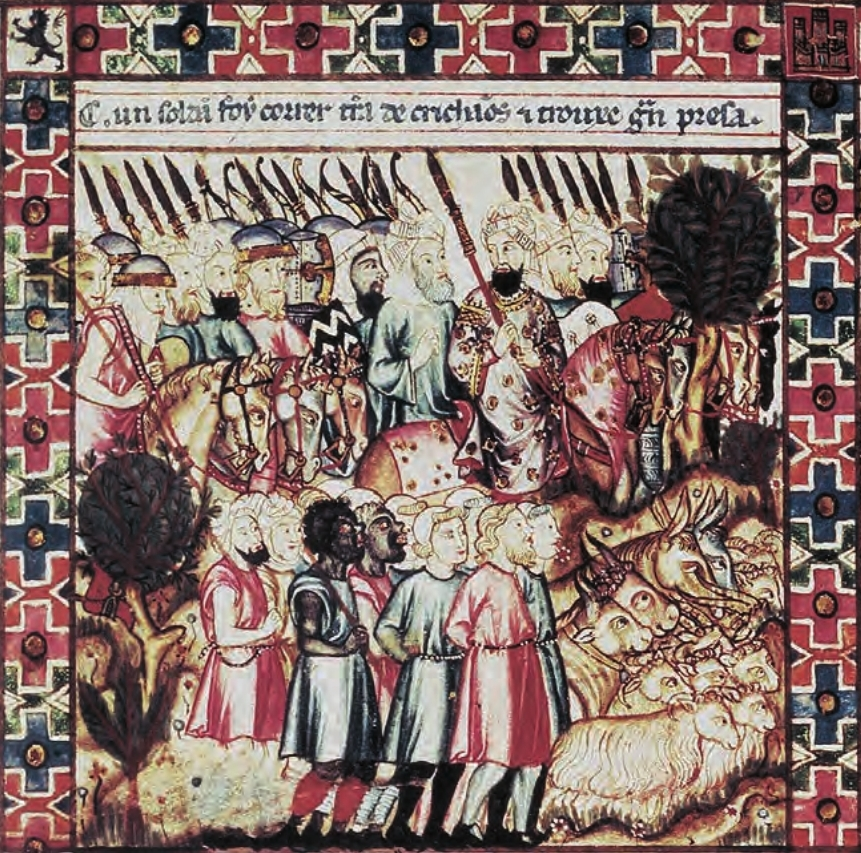
Slavic (saqaliba) and African slaves in Córdoba, Muslim Spain, 1200s

Al-Andalus, the Muslim-ruled area of the Iberian Peninsula, (711–1492) imported a large number of slaves to its own domestic market, as well as served as a staging point for Muslim and Jewish merchants to market slaves to the rest of the Islamic world. A ready market, especially for men of fighting age, could be found in Umayyad Spain, with its need for supplies of new Mamluks.

Al-Hakam was the first monarch of this family who surrounded his throne with a certain splendour and magnificence. He increased the number of mamelukes (slave soldiers) until they amounted to 5,000 horse and 1,000 foot. ... he increased the number of his slaves, eunuchs and servants; had a bodyguard of cavalry always stationed at the gate of his palace and surrounded his person with a guard of mamelukes .... these mamelukes were called Al-haras (the Guard) owing to their all being Christians or foreigners. They occupied two large barracks, with stables for their horses.

During the reign of Abd-ar-Rahman III (912–961), there were at first 3,750, then 6,087, and finally 13,750 Saqaliba, or Slavic slaves, at Córdoba, capital of the Umayyad Caliphate. Ibn Hawqal, Ibrahim al-Qarawi, and Bishop Liutprand of Cremona note that the Jewish merchants of Verdun specialized in castrating slaves, to be sold as eunuch saqaliba, which were enormously popular in Muslim Spain.

According to Roger Collins although the role of the Vikings in the slave trade in Iberia remains largely hypothetical, their depredations are clearly recorded. Raids on al-Andalus by Vikings are reported in the years 844, 859, 966, and 971, conforming to the general pattern of such activity concentrating in the mid ninth and late tenth centuries.

=== Slave trade of the Saracens ===
During the Middle ages, Saracen pirates established themselves in bases in France, the Baleares, Southern Italy and Sicily, from which they raided the coasts of the Christian Mediterranean and exported their prisoners as Saqaliba slaves to the slave markets of the Muslim Middle East.

The Aghlabids of Ifriqiya was a base for Saracen attacks along the Spanish East coast as well as against Southern Italy from the early 9th century; they attacked Rome in 845, Comacchio in 875–876, Monte Cassino in 882–83, and established the Emirate of Bari (847–871), the Emirate of Sicily (831–1091) and a base in Garigliano (882–906), which became bases of slave trade. During the warfare between Rome and the Byzantine Empire in Southern Italy in the 9th century, the Saracens made Southern Italy a supply source for a slave trade to Maghreb by the mid-9th century; the Western Emperor Louis II complained in a letter to the Byzantine Emperor that the Byzantines in Naples guided the Saracens in their raids toward South Italy and aided them in their slave trade with Italians to North Africa, an accusation noted also by the Lombard Chronicler Erchempert.

Moorish Saracen pirates from al-Andalus attacked Marseille and Arles and established a base in Camargue, Fraxinetum or La Garde-Freinet-Les Mautes (888–972), from which they made slave raids in to France; the population fled in fear of the slave raids, which made it difficult for the Frankish to secure their Southern coast, and the Saracens of Fraxinetum exported the Frankish prisoners they captured as slaves to the slave market of the Muslim Middle East. Many of the enslaved "Frankish" Saqaliba in Al-Andalus were really ethnic Visigoths and Hispano-Romans from the Hispanic March in northeastern Iberia, later to be known as the Catalan counties.

The Saracens captured the Baleares in 903, and made slave raids also from this base toward the coasts of the Christian Mediterranean and Sicily.

While the Saracen bases in France was eliminated in 972 and Italy in 1091, this did not prevent the Saracen piracy slave trade of the Mediterranean; both Almoravid dynasty (1040–1147) and the Almohad Caliphate (1121–1269) approved of the slave raiding of Saracen pirates toward non-Muslim ships in Gibraltar and the Mediterranean for the purpose of slave raiding.

=== Vikings ===
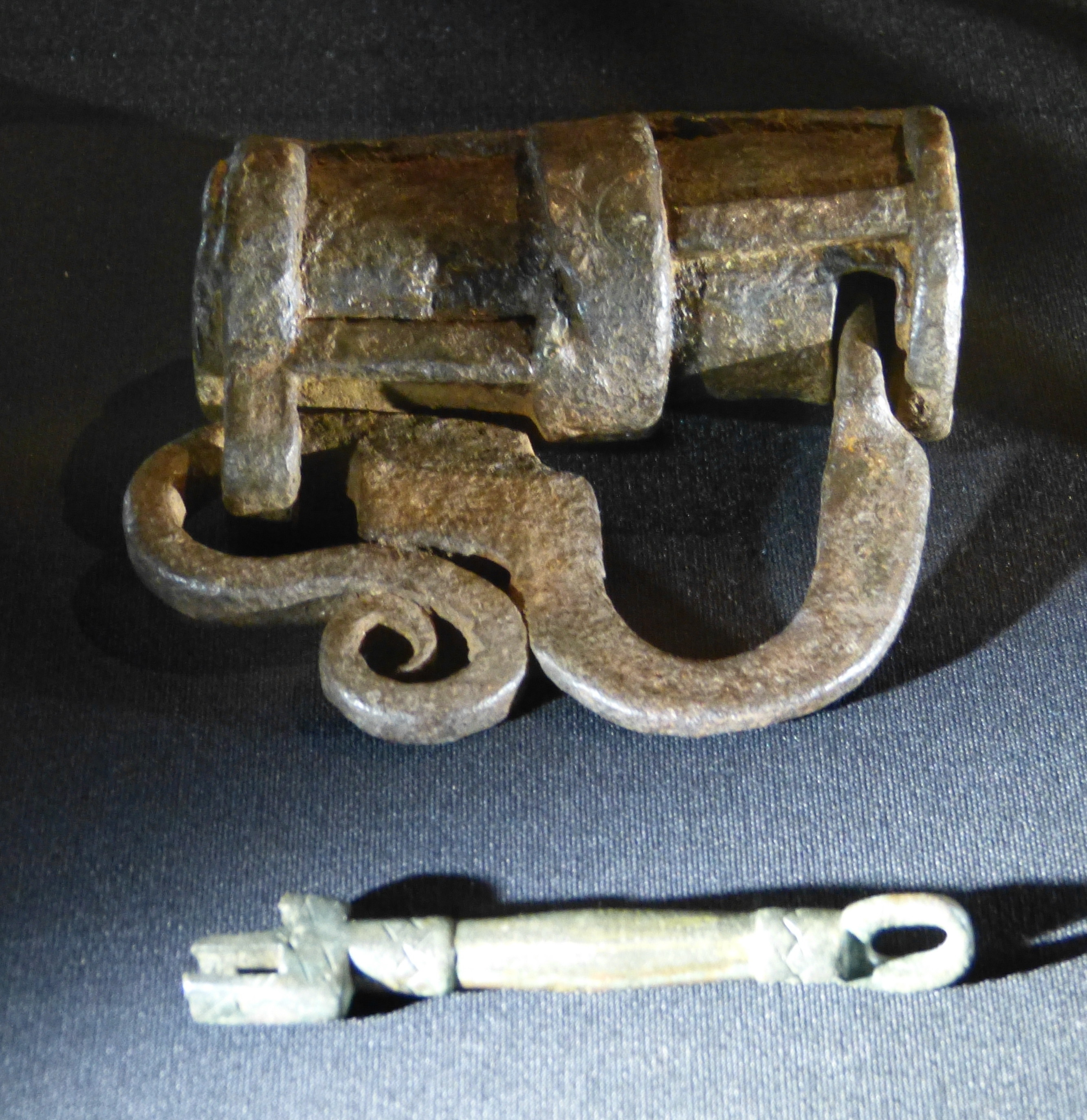
Slave chain lock and key. Sweden, Viking Age (8th–11th centuries)

The Nordic countries during the Viking Age (700–1100) practiced slavery. The Vikings called their slaves thralls (Old Norse: Þræll). There were also other terms used to describe thralls based on gender, such as ambatt/ambott and deja. Ambott is used in reference to female slaves, as is deja. Another name that is indicative of thrall status is bryti, which has associations with food. The word can be understood to mean, cook, and to break bread, which would place a person with this label as the person in charge of food in some manner. There is a runic inscription that describes a man of bryti status named Tolir who was able to marry and acted as the king's estate manager. Another name is muslegoman, which would have been used for a runaway slave. From this, it can be gathered that the different names for those who were thralls indicate position and duties performed.

A fundamental part of Viking activity was the sale and taking of captives. The thralls were mostly from Western Europe, among them many Franks, Anglo-Saxons, and Celts. Many Irish slaves were brought on expeditions for the colonization of Iceland (874–930). The collection of slaves was a by-product of conflict. The Annals of Fulda recorded that Franks who had been defeated by a group of Vikings in 880 AD were taken as captives after being defeated. Viking groups would have political conflicts that also resulted in the taking of captives.

The Vikings trafficked Slavic slaves captured in Viking raids in Eastern Europe in two destinations from present-day Russia via the Volga trade route; one to the Abbasid Caliphate in the Middle East – through the Caspian Sea, the Samanid slave trade, and Iran. The other route led to the Byzantine Empire and the Mediterranean via the Dnieper and the Black Sea slave trade. Scandinavian trade centers stretched eastwards from Hedeby in Denmark and Birka in Sweden to Staraya Ladoga in northern Russia before the end of the 8th century.

This traffic continued into the 9th century as Scandinavians founded more trade centers at Kaupang in southwestern Norway and Novgorod, farther south than Staraya Ladoga, and Kiev, farther south still and closer to Byzantium. Dublin and other northwestern European Viking settlements were established as gateways through which captives were traded northwards. An account from the Laxdoela Saga spoke of how during the 10th century there would be a meeting of kings every third year on the Branno Islands where negotiations and trades for slaves would take place. Though slaves could be bought and sold, it was more common to sell captives from other nations.

The 10th-century Persian traveler Ibn Rustah described how Vikings, the Varangians or Rus, terrorized and enslaved the Slavs taken in their raids along the Volga River. Slaves were often sold south, to Byzantium via the Black Sea slave trade, or to Muslim buyers, via paths such as the Volga trade route through the Khazar slave trade and later the Volga Bulgarian slave trade to the Bukhara slave trade in Central Asia and from there to slavery in the Abbasid Caliphate.

People taken captive during the Viking raids across Eastern Europe could be sold to Moorish Spain via the Dublin slave trade, or transported to Hedeby or Brännö and from there via the Volga trade route to present-day Russia, where slaves and furs were sold to Muslim merchants in exchange for Arab silver dirham and silk, which have been found in Birka, Wollin, and Dublin; initially this trade route between Europe and the Abbasid Caliphate passed via the Khazar Kaghanate, but from the early 10th century onward it went via Volga Bulgaria.

Ahmad ibn Fadlan of Baghdad provides an account of the other end of this trade route, namely of Volga Vikings selling Slavic slaves to middle-eastern merchants. Finland proved another source for Viking slave raids. Slaves from Finland or Baltic states were traded as far as Central Asia, that is the Bukhara slave trade, connecting it to the slavery in the Abbasid Caliphate in the Middle East. Captives may have been traded far within the Viking trade network, and within that network, it was possible to be sold again. In the Life of St. Findan, the Irishman was bought and sold three times after being taken captive by a Viking group.

=== Mongols ===
Mongol Empire and its subsequent divisions with the khanate of the Golden Horde in green, 13th century

The Mongol invasions and conquests in the 13th century added a new force in the slave trade, and the slave trade in the Mongol Empire established an international slave market. The Mongols enslaved skilled individuals, women and children and marched them to Karakorum or Sarai, whence they were sold throughout Eurasia. Many of these slaves were shipped to the slave market in Novgorod.

Genoese and Venetians merchants in Crimea were involved in the slave trade with the Golden Horde. In 1441, Haci I Giray declared independence from the Golden Horde and established the Crimean Khanate. In the time of the Crimean Khanate, Crimeans engaged in frequent raids into the Danubian principalities, Poland-Lithuania, and Muscovy. For each captive, the khan received a fixed share (savğa) of 10% or 20%. The campaigns by Crimean forces categorize into "sefers", officially declared military operations led by the khans themselves, and çapuls, raids undertaken by groups of noblemen, sometimes illegally because they contravened treaties concluded by the khans with neighbouring rulers. For a long time, until the early 18th century, the khanate maintained a massive slave trade with the Ottoman Empire and the Middle East known as the Crimean slave trade. The Genoese colony of Caffa on the Black Sea coast of Crimea was one of the best known and significant trading ports and slave markets. Crimean Tatar raiders enslaved more than 1 million Eastern Europeans.

=== England and Ireland ===
In medieval Ireland, as a commonly traded commodity slaves could, like cattle, become a form of internal or trans-border currency. In 1102, the Council of London convened by Anselm of Canterbury obtained a resolution against the slave trade in England which was aimed mainly at the sale of English slaves to the Irish.

=== Christians holding Muslim slaves ===
Although the primary flow of slaves was toward Muslim countries, as evident in the history of slavery in the Muslim world, Christians did acquire Muslim slaves; in Southern France, in the 13th century, "the enslavement of Muslim captives was still fairly common". There are records, for example, of Saracen slave girls sold in Marseille in 1248, a date which coincided with the fall of Seville and its surrounding area, to raiding Christian crusaders, an event during which a large number of Muslim women from this area were enslaved as war booty, as it has been recorded in some Arabic poetry, notably by the poet al-Rundi, who was contemporary to the events.

Additionally, the possession of slaves was legal in 13th century Italy; many Christians held Muslim slaves throughout the country. These Saracen slaves were often captured by pirates and brought to Italy from Muslim Spain or North Africa. During the 13th century, most of the slaves in the Italian trade city of Genoa were of Muslim origin. These Muslim slaves were owned by royalty, military orders or groups, independent entities, and the church itself.

Christians also sold Muslim slaves captured in war. The Order of the Knights of Malta attacked pirates and Muslim ships, and their base on Malta became a center for slave trading, selling captured North Africans and Turks. Hospitaller Malta remained a slave market until slavery was abolished after the knights' rule ended in 1798. One thousand slaves were required to man the galleys (ships) of the Order.

While they would at times seize Muslims as slaves, it was more likely that Christian armies would kill their enemies, rather than take them into servitude.

=== Jewish slave trade ===
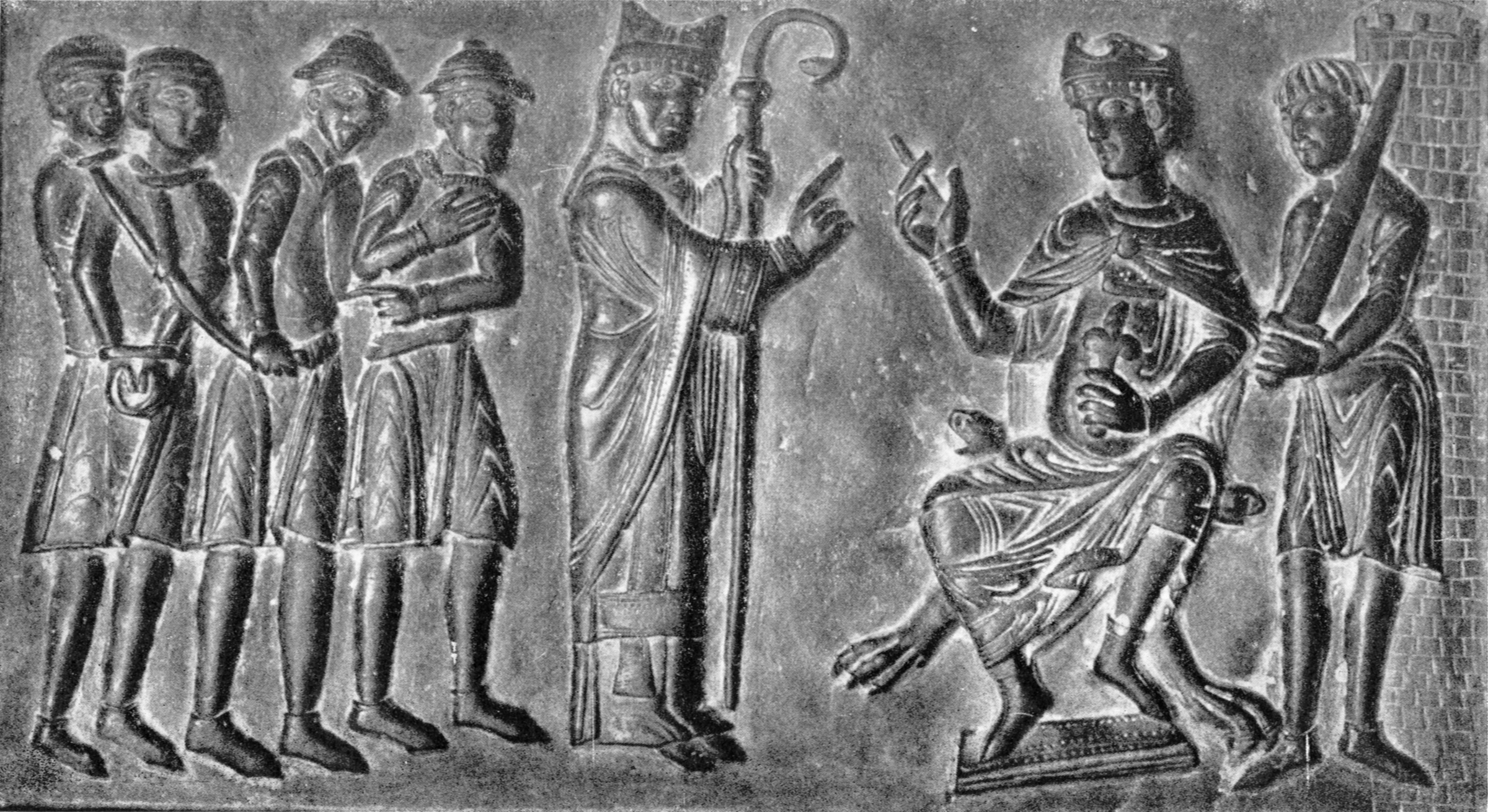
Christian slaves stand with Jewish merchants while bishop pleads for their release with duke of Bohemia, 1100s

The role of Jewish merchants in the early medieval slave trade has been subject to much misinterpretation and distortion. Although medieval records demonstrate that there were Jews who owned slaves in medieval Europe, Toch (2013) notes that the claim repeated in older sources, such as those by Charles Verlinden, that Jewish merchants were the primary dealers in European slaves is based on misreadings of primary documents from that era. Contemporary Jewish sources do not attest any large-scale slave trade or ownership of slaves which may be distinguished from the wider phenomenon of early medieval European slavery. The trope of the Jewish dealer of Christian slaves was additionally a prominent canard in medieval European antisemitic propaganda.

=== Slave trade at the close of the Middle Ages ===
As more and more of Europe Christianized, and open hostilities between Christian and Muslim nations intensified, large-scale slave trade moved to more distant sources. Sending slaves to Egypt, for example, was forbidden by the papacy in 1317, 1323, 1329, 1338, and, finally, 1425, as slaves sent to Egypt would often become soldiers, and end up fighting their former Christian owners. Although the repeated bans indicate that such trade still occurred, they also indicate that it became less desirable. In the 16th century, African slaves replaced almost all other ethnicities and religious enslaved groups in European domains (the European colonies).

== Slavery in law ==
=== Secular law ===
Slavery was heavily regulated in Roman law, which was reorganized in the Byzantine Empire by Justinian I as the Corpus Iuris Civilis. Although the Corpus was lost to the West for centuries, it was rediscovered in the 11th and 12th centuries, and led to the foundation of law schools in Italy and France. According to the Corpus, the natural state of humanity is freedom, but the "law of nations" may supersede natural law and reduce certain people to slavery. The basic definition of slave in Romano-Byzantine law was:

- anyone whose mother was a slave
- anyone who has been captured in battle
- anyone who has sold himself to pay a debt

It was, however, possible to become a freedman or a full citizen; the Corpus, like Roman law, had extensive and complicated rules for manumission of slaves.

The slave trade in England was officially abolished in 1102. In Poland, slavery was forbidden in the 15th century; it was replaced by the second enserfment. In Lithuania, slavery was formally abolished in 1588.

=== Canon law ===
In fact, there was an explicit legal justification given for the enslavement of Muslims, found in the Decretum Gratiani and later expanded upon by the 14th century jurist Oldradus de Ponte: the Bible states that Hagar, the slave girl of Abraham, was beaten and cast out by Abraham's wife Sarah. The Decretum, like the Corpus, defined a slave as anyone whose mother was a slave. Otherwise, the canons were concerned with slavery only in ecclesiastical contexts: slaves for instance were not permitted to be ordained as clergy.

== Slavery in medieval Europe by region ==
=== Slavery in the Islamic Near East ===
The ancient and medieval Near East includes modern day Turkey, the Levant and Egypt, with strong connections to the rest of the North African coastline. All of these areas were ruled by either the Byzantines or the Persians at the end of late antiquity. Pre-existing Byzantine (i.e. Roman) and Persian institutions of slavery may have influenced the development of institutions of slavery in Islamic law and jurisprudence. Likewise, some scholars have argued for the influence of Rabbinic tradition in regards to slavery on the development of Islamic legal thought.

Whatever the relationship between these different legal traditions, many similarities exist between the practice of Islamic slavery in the early Middle Ages and the practices of early medieval Byzantines and western Europeans. The status of freed slaves under Islamic rule, who continued to owe services to their former masters, bears a strong similarity to slavery in ancient Rome and slavery in ancient Greece. However, the practice of slavery in the early medieval Near East also grew out of slavery practices in currency among pre-Islamic Arabs.

==== Islamic states ====
Rise of Islam in the Near East and its expansion to the Mediterranean region from 622 to 750 AD Muhammad, 622–632 Rashidun Caliphate, 632–661 Umayyad Caliphate, 661–750

The institution of slavery in the Muslim world during the Middle ages is represented by the institution of slavery in the Muslim empires the united most of the Islamic Middle East: the slavery in the Rashidun Caliphate (632–661), the slavery in the Umayyad Caliphate (661–750), slavery in the Abbasid Caliphate (750–1258) and slavery in the Mamluk Sultanate (1258–1516), which in turn were all built upon slavery in Islamic Law.

Like the Old and New Testaments and Greek and Roman law codes, the Quran takes the institution of slavery for granted, though it urges kindness toward slaves and eventual manumission, especially for slaves who convert to Islam. In the Early Middle Ages, many slaves in Islamic society served as such for only a short period of time – perhaps an average of seven years. Like their European counterparts, early medieval Islamic slave traders preferred slaves who were not co-religionists and hence focused on "pagans" from inner Asia, Europe, and especially from sub-Saharan Africa. The practice of manumission may have contributed to the integration of former slaves into the wider society. However, under sharia law, conversion to Islam did not necessitate manumission.

Slaves were employed in heavy labor as well as in domestic contexts. Because of Quranic allowance of concubinage, early Islamic traders, in contrast to Byzantine and early modern slave traders, imported large numbers of female slaves. Aside from the female slaves used as concubines in private harems, female slaves were also used for prostitution. The Islamic Law formally prohibited prostitution. However, since Islamic Law allowed a man to have sexual intercourse with his female slave, prostitution was practiced by a pimp temporary selling his female slave on the slave market to a client, who returned his ownership of her after 1–2 days on the pretext of discontent after having had intercourse with her, which was a legal and accepted method for prostitution in the Islamic world. This form of prostitution was practiced by for example Ibn Batuta, who acquired several female slaves during his travels.

The very earliest Islamic states did not create corps of slave soldiers (a practice familiar from later contexts) but did integrate freedmen into armies, which may have contributed to the rapid expansion of early Islamic conquest. By the 9th century, use of slaves in Islamic armies, particularly Turks in cavalry units and Africans in infantry units, was a relatively common practice.

In Egypt, Ahmad ibn Tulun imported thousands of black slaves to wrestle independence from the Abbasid Caliphate in Iraq in 868. The Ikhshidid dynasty used black slave units to liberate itself from Abbasid rule after the Abbasids destroyed ibn Tulun's autonomous empire in 935. Black professional soldiers were most associated with the Fatimid dynasty, which incorporated more professional black soldiers than the previous two dynasties. It was the Fatimids who first incorporated black professional slave soldiers into the cavalry, despite massive opposition from Central Asian Turkish Mamluks, who saw the African contingent as a threat to their role as the leading military unit in the Egyptian army.

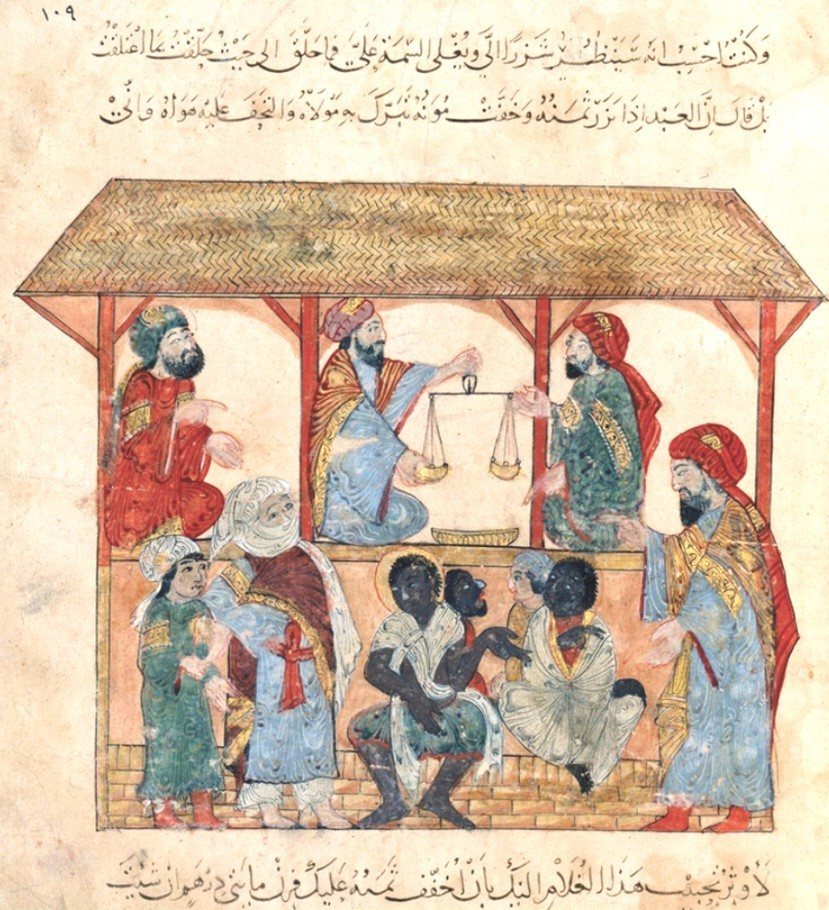
13th-century slave market in Yemen

In the later half of the Middle Ages, the expansion of Islamic rule further into the Mediterranean, the Persian Gulf, and Arabian Peninsula established the Saharan-Indian Ocean slave trade. This network was a large market for African slaves, transporting approximately four million African slaves from its 7th century inception to its 20th century demise. Ironically, the consolidation of borders in the Islamic Near East changed the face of the slave trade. A rigid Islamic code, coupled with crystallizing frontiers, favored slave purchase and tribute over capture as lucrative slave avenues. Even the sources of slaves shifted from the Fertile Crescent and Central Asia to Indochina and the Byzantine Empire. Patterns of preference for slaves in the Near East, as well as patterns of use, continued into the later Middle Ages with only slight changes. Slaves were employed in many activities, including agriculture, industry, the military, and domestic labor. Women were prioritized over men, and usually served in the domestic sphere as menials, concubines (cariye), or wives. Domestic and commercial slaves were mostly better off than their agricultural counterparts, either becoming family members or business partners rather than condemned to a grueling life in a chain gang. There are references to gangs of slaves, mostly African, put to work in drainage projects in Iraq, salt and gold mines in the Sahara, and sugar and cotton plantations in North Africa and Spain. References to this latter type of slavery are rare, however. Eunuchs were the most prized and sought-after type of slave.

The most fortunate slaves found employment in politics or the military. In the Ottoman Empire, the Devşirme system groomed young slave boys for civil or military service. Young Christian boys were uprooted from their conquered villages periodically as a levy, and were employed in government, entertainment, or the army, depending on their talents. Slaves attained great success from this program, some winning the post of Grand Vizier to the Sultan and others positions in the Janissaries.

It is a bit of a misnomer to classify these men as "slaves", because in the Ottoman Empire, they were referred to as kul, or, slaves "of the Gate", or Sultanate. While not slaves per se under Islamic law, these Devşrime alumni remained under the Sultan's discretion.

The Islamic Near East extensively relied upon professional slave soldiers, and was known for having them compose the core of armies. The institution was conceived out of political predicaments and reflected the attitudes of the time, and was not indicative of political decline or financial bankruptcy. Slave units were desired because of their unadulterated loyalty to the ruler, since they were imported and therefore could not threaten the throne with local loyalties or alliances.

==== Ottoman Empire ====
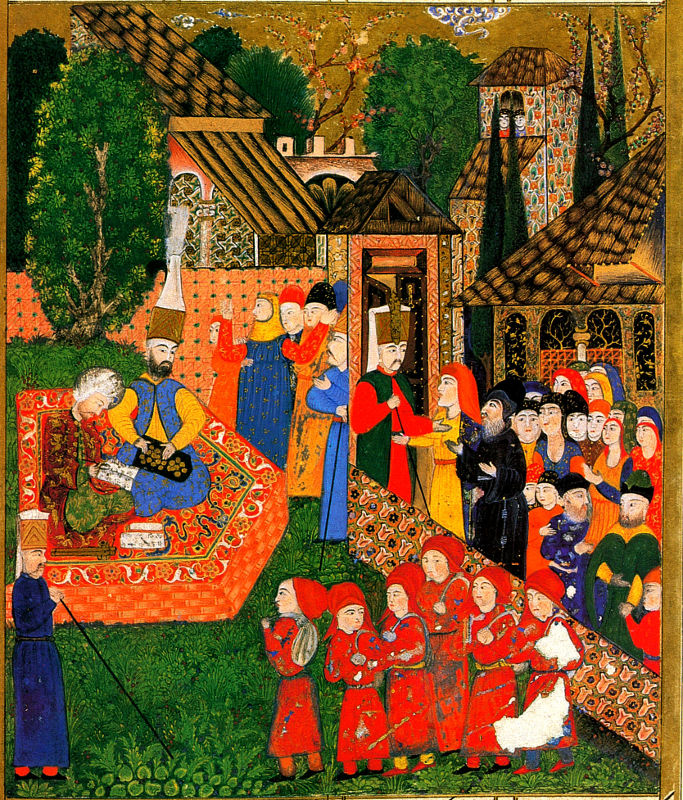
Ottoman painting of Balkan children in red being forcibly taken under the devşirme ("blood tax") system as soldier-slaves for the janissary army

Slavery was an important part of Ottoman society. The Byzantine–Ottoman wars and the Ottoman wars in Europe brought large numbers of Christian slaves into the Ottoman Empire. In the middle of the 14th century, Murad I built his own personal slave army called the Kapıkulu. The new force was based on the sultan's right to a fifth of the war booty, which he interpreted to include captives taken in battle. The captive slaves were converted to Islam and trained in the sultan's personal service.

In the devşirme (translated "blood tax" or "child collection"), young Christian boys from Anatolia and the Balkans were taken away from their homes and families, converted to Islam and enlisted into special soldier classes of the Ottoman army. These soldier classes were named Janissaries, the most famous branch of the Kapıkulu. The Janissaries eventually became a decisive factor in the Ottoman military conquests in Europe.

Most of the military commanders of the Ottoman forces, imperial administrators and de facto rulers of the Ottoman Empire, such as Pargalı İbrahim Pasha and Sokollu Mehmet Paşa, were recruited in this way. By 1609, the Sultan's Kapıkulu forces increased to about 100,000.

The concubines of the Ottoman Sultan consisted chiefly of purchased slaves. Because Islamic law forbade Muslims to enslave fellow Muslims, the Sultan's concubines were generally of Christian origin (cariye). The mother of a Sultan, though technically a slave, received the extremely powerful title of Valide Sultan, and at times became effective ruler of the Empire (see Sultanate of women). One notable example was Kösem Sultan, daughter of a Greek Christian priest, who dominated the Ottoman Empire during the early decades of the 17th century. Another notable example was Roxelana, the favourite wife of Suleiman the Magnificent.

=== Slavery in the Crusader states ===
As a result of the Crusades, thousands of Muslims and Christians were sold into slavery. Once sold into slavery most were never heard from again, so it is challenging to find evidence of specific slave experiences.

In the crusader Kingdom of Jerusalem, founded in 1099, at most 120,000 Franks ruled over 350,000 Muslims, Jews, and native Eastern Christians. Following the initial invasion and conquest, sometimes accompanied by massacres or expulsions of Jews and Muslims, a peaceable co-existence between followers of the three religions prevailed. The Crusader states inherited many slaves. To this may have been added some Muslims taken as captives of war. The Kingdom's largest city, Acre, had a large slave market; however, the vast majority of Muslims and Jews remained free. The laws of Jerusalem declared that former Muslim slaves, if genuine converts to Christianity, must be freed.

In 1120, the Council of Nablus forbade sexual relations between crusaders and their female Muslim slaves: if a man raped his own slave, he would be castrated, but if he raped someone else's slave, he would be castrated and exiled from the kingdom. But Benjamin Z. Kedar argued that the canons of the Council of Nablus were in force in the 12th century but had fallen out of use by the thirteenth. Marwan Nader questions this and suggests that the canons may not have applied to the whole kingdom at all times.

Christian law mandated Christians could not enslave other Christians; however, enslaving non-Christians was acceptable. In fact, military orders frequently enslaved Muslims and used slave labor for agricultural estates. No Christian, whether Western or Eastern, was permitted by law to be sold into slavery, but this fate was as common for Muslim prisoners of war as it was for Christian prisoners taken by the Muslims. In the later medieval period, some slaves were used to oar Hospitaller ships. Generally, it was a relatively small number non-Christian slaves in medieval Europe, and this number significantly decreased by the end of the medieval period.

The 13th-century Assizes of Jerusalem dealt more with fugitive slaves and the punishments ascribed to them, the prohibition of slaves testifying in court, and manumission of slaves, which could be accomplished, for example, through a will, or by conversion to Christianity. Conversion was apparently used as an excuse to escape slavery by Muslims who would then continue to practise Islam; crusader lords often refused to allow them to convert, and Pope Gregory IX, contrary to both the laws of Jerusalem and the canon laws that he himself was partially responsible for compiling, allowed for Muslim slaves to remain enslaved even if they had converted.

=== Slavery in Iberia ===
Communities of Muslims, Christians, and Jews existed on both sides of the political divide between Muslim and Christian kingdoms in Medieval Iberia: Al-Andalus hosted Jewish and Christian communities while Christian Iberia hosted Muslim and Jewish communities. Christianity had introduced the ethos that banned the enslavement of fellow Christians, an ethos that was reinforced by the banning of the enslavement of co-religionists during the rise of Islam. Additionally, the Dar al-Islam protected 'people of the book' (Christians and Jews living in Islamic lands) from enslavement, an immunity which also applied to Muslims living in Christian Iberia. Despite these restrictions, criminal or indebted Muslims and Christians in both regions were still subject to judicially-sanctioned slavery.

==== Islamic Iberia ====
Al-Andalus in 732

An early economic pillar of the Islamic empire in Iberia (Al-Andalus) during the eighth century was the al-Andalus slave trade. Due to manumission being a form of piety under Islamic law, slavery in Muslim Spain could not maintain the same level of auto-reproduction as societies with older slave populations. Therefore, Al-Andalus relied on trade systems as an external means of replenishing the supply of enslaved people. Forming relations between the Umayyads, Khārijites and 'Abbāsids, the flow of trafficked people from the main routes of the Sahara towards Al-Andalus served as a highly lucrative trade configuration. The archaeological evidence of human trafficking and proliferation of early trade in this case follows numismatics and materiality of text. This monetary structure of consistent gold influx proved to be a tenet in the development of Islamic commerce. In this regard, the slave trade outperformed and was the most commercially successful venture for maximizing capital. This major change in the form of numismatics serves as a paradigm shift from the previous Visigothic economic arrangement. Additionally, it demonstrates profound change from one regional entity to another, the direct transfer of people and pure coinage from one religiously similar semi-autonomous province to another.

The medieval Iberian Peninsula was the scene of episodic warfare among Muslims and Christians (although sometimes Muslims and Christians were allies). Periodic raiding expeditions were sent from Al-Andalus to ravage the Christian Iberian kingdoms, bringing back booty and people. For example, in a raid on Lisbon in 1189 the Almohad caliph Yaqub al-Mansur took 3,000 female and child captives, and his governor of Córdoba took 3,000 Christian slaves in a subsequent attack upon Silves in 1191; an offensive by Alfonso VIII of Castile in 1182 brought him over two-thousand Muslim slaves. These raiding expeditions also included the Sa'ifa (summer) incursions, a tradition produced during the Amir reign of Cordoba. In addition to acquiring wealth, some of these Sa'ifa raids sought to bring mostly male captives, often eunuchs, back to Al-Andalus. They were generically referred to as Saqaliba, the Arab word for Slavs. Slavs' status as the most common group in the slave trade by the tenth century led to the development of the word "slave". The Saqaliba were mostly assigned to palaces as guards, concubines, and eunuchs, although they were sometimes privately owned. Along with Christians and Slavs, Sub-Saharan Africans were also held as slaves, brought back from the caravan trade in the Sahara. Slaves in Islamic lands were generally used for domestic slavery, sexual slavery, military slavery, and administrative purposes, rarely used for agriculture or large-scale manufacturing. Christians living in Al-Andalus were not allowed to hold authority over Muslims, but they were permitted to hold non-Muslim slaves.

=== Christian Iberia ===
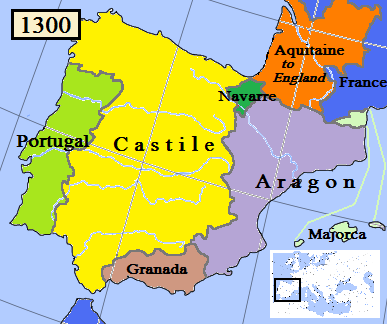
Iberia in 1300 AD (partially based on Euratlas map of Europe, 1300)

Contrary to suppositions of historians such as Marc Bloch, slavery thrived as an institution in medieval Christian Iberia. Slavery existed in the region under the Romans, and continued to do so under the Visigoths. From the fifth to the early 8th century, large portions of the Iberian Peninsula were ruled by Christian Visigothic Kingdoms, whose rulers worked to codify human bondage. In the 7th century, King Chindasuinth issued the Visigothic Code (Liber Iudiciorum), to which subsequent Visigothic kings added new legislation. Although the Visigothic Kingdom collapsed in the early 8th century, portions of the Visigothic Code were still observed in parts of Spain in the following centuries. The Code, with its pronounced and frequent attention to the legal status of slaves, reveals the continuation of slavery as an institution in post-Roman Spain.

The Code regulated the social conditions, behavior, and punishments of slaves in early medieval Spain. The marriage of slaves and free or freed people was prohibited. Book III, title II, iii ("Where a Freeborn Woman Marries the Slave of Another or a Freeborn Man the Female Slave of Another") stipulates that if a free woman marries another person's slave, the couple is to be separated and given 100 lashes. Furthermore, if the woman refuses to leave the slave, then she becomes the property of the slave's master. Likewise, any children born to the couple would follow the father's condition and be slaves.

Unlike Roman law, in which only slaves were liable to corporal punishment, under Visigothic law, people of any social status were subject to corporal punishment. However, the physical punishment, typically beatings, administered to slaves was consistently harsher than that administered to freed or free people. Slaves could also be compelled to give testimony under torture. For example, slaves could be tortured to reveal the adultery of their masters, and it was illegal to free a slave for fear of what he or she might reveal under torture. Slaves' greater liability to physical punishment and judicial torture suggests their inferior social status in the eyes of Visigothic lawmakers.

Slavery remained persistent in Christian Iberia after the Umayyad invasions in the 8th century, and the Visigothic law codes continued to control slave ownership. However, as William Phillips notes, medieval Iberia should not be thought of as a slave society, but rather as a society that owned slaves. Slaves accounted for a relatively small percentage of the population, and did not make up a significant portion of the labor pool. Furthermore, while the existence of slavery continued from the earlier period, the use of slaves in post-Visigothic Christian Iberia differed from early periods. Ian Wood has suggests that, under the Visigoths, the majority of the slave population lived and worked on rural estates.

After the Muslim invasions, slave owners (especially in the kingdoms of Aragon and Valencia) moved away from using slaves as field laborers or in work gangs, and did not press slaves into military service. Slaves tended to be owned singly rather than in large groups. There appear to have been many more female than male slaves, and they were most often used as domestic servants, or to supplement free labor. In this respect, slave institutions in Aragon, especially, closely resembled those of other Mediterranean Christian kingdoms in France and Italy.

In the kingdoms of León and Castile, slavery followed the Visigothic model more closely than in the littoral kingdoms. Slaves in León and Castile were more likely to be employed as field laborers, supplanting free labor to support an aristocratic estate society. These trends in slave populations and use changed in the wake of the Black Death in 1348, which significantly increased the demand for slaves across the whole of the peninsula.

Christians were not the only slaveholders in Christian Iberia. Both Jews and Muslims living under Christian rule owned slaves, though more commonly in Aragon and Valencia than in Castile. After the conquest of Valencia in 1245, the Kingdom of Aragon prohibited the possession of Christian slaves by Jews, though they were still permitted to hold Muslim or pagan slaves. The main role of Iberian Jews in the slave trade came as facilitators: Jews acted as slave brokers and agents of transfer between the Christian and Muslim kingdoms.

This role caused some degree of fear among Christian populations. A letter from Pope Gregory XI to the Bishop of Cordoba in 1239 addressed rumors that the Jews were involved in kidnapping and selling Christian women and children into slavery while their husbands were away fighting the Muslims. Despite these worries, the primary role of Jewish slave traders lay in facilitating the exchange of captives between Muslim and Christian rulers, one of the primary threads of economic and political connectivity between Christian and Muslim Iberia.

In the early period after the fall of the Visigothic kingdom in the 8th century, slaves primarily came into Christian Iberia through trade with the Muslim kingdoms of the south. Most were Eastern European, captured in battles and raids, with the heavy majority being Slavs. However, the ethnic composition of slaves in Christian Iberia shifted over the course of the Middle Ages. Slaveholders in the Christian kingdoms gradually moved away from owning Christians, in accordance with Church proscriptions. In the middle of the medieval period most slaves in Christian Iberia were Muslim, either captured in battle with the Islamic states from the southern part of the peninsula, or taken from the eastern Mediterranean and imported into Iberia by merchants from cities such as Genoa.

The Christian kingdoms of Iberia frequently traded their Muslim captives back across the border for payments of money or kind. Indeed, historian James Broadman writes that this type of redemption offered the best chance for captives and slaves to regain their freedom. The sale of Muslim captives, either back to the Islamic southern states or to third-party slave brokers, supplied one of the means by which Aragon and Castile financed the Reconquista. Battles and sieges provided large numbers of captives; after the siege of Almeria in 1147, sources report that Alfonso VII of León sent almost 10,000 of the city's Muslim women and children to Genoa to be sold into slavery as partial repayment of Genoese assistance in the campaign.

Towards the end of the Reconquista, however, this source of slaves became increasingly exhausted. Muslim rulers were increasingly unable to pay ransoms, and the Christian capture of large centers of population in the south made wholesale enslavement of Muslim populations impractical. The loss of an Iberian Muslim source of slaves further encouraged Christians to look to other sources of manpower. Beginning with the first Portuguese slave raid in sub-Saharan Africa in 1411, the focus of slave importation began to shift from the Mediterranean to the Atlantic World, and the racial composition of slaves in Christian Iberia began to include an increasing number of Sub-Saharan Africans.

Between 1489 and 1497, almost 2,100 black slaves were shipped from Portugal to Valencia. By the end of the 15th century, Spain held the largest population of black Africans in Europe, with a small, but growing community of black ex-slaves. In the mid 16th century Spain imported up to 2,000 black African slaves annually through Portugal, and by 1565 most of Seville's 6,327 slaves (out of a total population of 85,538) were black Africans.

=== Slavery in the Mediterranean ===
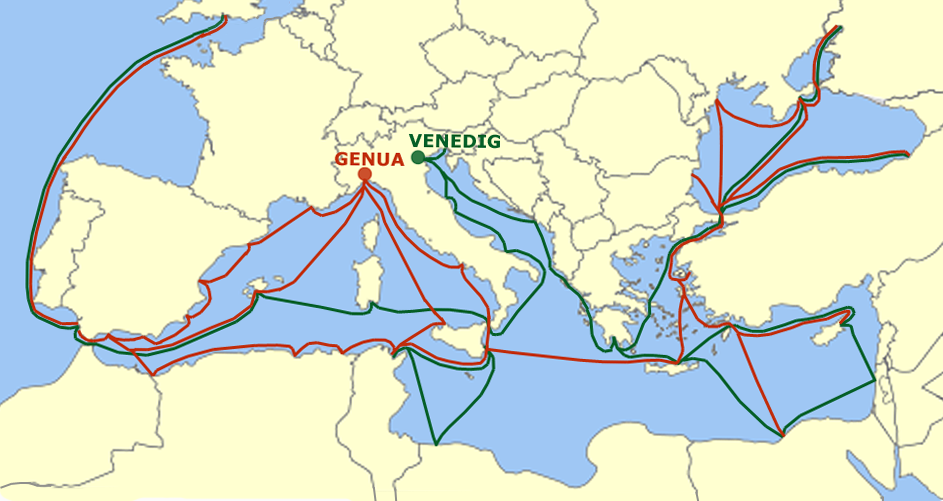
Maritime republics of Genoa (red) and Venice (green) and their trade routes in the Mediterranean region

In the Mediterranean region, individuals became enslaved through war and conquest, piracy, and frontier raiding. Additionally, some courts would sentence people to slavery, and even some people sold themselves or their children into slavery due to extreme poverty. The incentive for slavery in the Mediterranean was the greed of the slavers. The motivation behind many raids was to make money from the resulting slaves, with no political or religious agenda. Also, state and religious institutions frequently participated in the ransoming of individuals, so piracy became a lucrative market. This meant some individuals were returned home while others were sold away.

The Mediterranean islands were subjected to occasional razzias and attacks by Arabs from North Africa, and later by Barbary corsairs and the Ottoman Empire. In 1423–1424, Malta was raided by Arabs and the island's bishop was among those taken into captivity. Between September and October 1429, Malta was invaded by the Hafsids from North Africa. Thousands of Maltese were captured and enslaved by the invaders: a sizeable percentage of the island's total population at the time, which might have been as low as 10,000. In 1424–1426, Egyptian Mamluks invaded and conquered Cyprus, enslaving thousands of islanders.

For those who traded in the Mediterranean, it was the humanity and intellect of these enslaved peoples that made them valuable merchandise worth commodifying. To purchase an individual was to purchase their labor, autonomy, and faith; religious conversion was often a motivation for these transactions. Additionally, religious division was the fundamental basis of law for the ownership of slaves during this period; it was not legal for Christians, Muslims, or Jewish people to enslave fellow believers. However, the enslavement, and compulsory conversion, of nonbelievers or people from other religions was permissible.

There were markets throughout the Mediterranean where enslaved people were bought and sold. In Italy the major slave trade centers were Venice and Genoa; in Iberia they were Barcelona and Valencia; and islands off the Mediterranean including Majorca, Sardinia, Sicily, Crete, Rhodes, Cyprus, and Chios also participated in slave markets. From these markets merchants would sell enslaved people domestically, or transport them to somewhere enslaved people were more in demand. For example, the Italian slave market often found itself selling to Egypt in order to meet the Mamluk demand for slaves. This demand caused Venice and Genoa to compete with one another for control of Black Sea trading ports.

The duties and expectations of slaves varied geographically; however, in the Mediterranean, it was most common for enslaved people to work in the households of elites. Enslaved people also worked in agricultural fields, but this was infrequent across the Mediterranean. It was most common in Venetian Crete, Genoese Chios, and Cyprus where enslaved people worked in vineyards, fields, and sugar mills. These were colonial societies, and enslaved people worked with free laborers in these areas. Enslaved women were sought after the most and therefore sold at the highest prices. This reflects the desire for domestic workers in elite households; however, enslaved women also could face sexual exploitation. Furthermore, even if freed from their stations, the former masters of these women often maintained power over them by becoming their employers or patrons.

=== Slavery in Moldavia and Wallachia ===
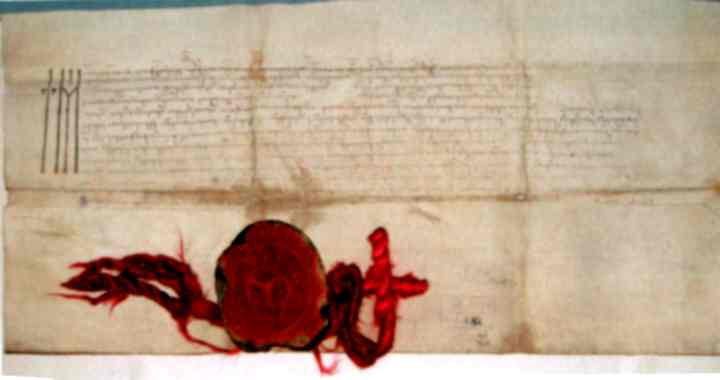
Donation deed in which Stephen III of Moldavia donates a number of sălașe of Roma slaves to the Rădăuţi bishopric

Slavery existed on the territory of present-day Romania before the founding of the principalities of Wallachia and Moldavia in the 13th–14th centuries. It continued while under Ottoman and Russian Empire rule until it was gradually abolished during the 1840s and 1850s, prior to the independence of the United Principalities of Moldavia and Wallachia. In Transylvania and Bukovina (parts of the Habsburg monarchy and later Austria-Hungary), it lasted until 1783. Most slaves were of Roma (Gypsy) ethnicity and a significant number of Rumâni in serfdom slavery.

Historian Nicolae Iorga associated the Roma people's arrival with the 1241 Mongol invasion of Europe and considered their slavery as a vestige of that era. The practice of enslaving prisoners may also have been taken from the Mongols. The ethnic identity of the "Tatar slaves" is unknown, they could have been captured Tatars of the Golden Horde, Cumans, or the slaves of Tatars and Cumans.

While it is possible that some Romani people were slaves or auxiliary troops of the Mongols or Tatars and Nogai Horde, the bulk of them came from south of the Danube at the end of the 14th century, some time before the foundation of Wallachia. The Roma slaves were owned by the boyars (see Wallachian Revolution of 1848), the Christian Orthodox monasteries, or the state. They were used only as smiths, gold panners and as agricultural workers.

The Rumâni were only owned by boyars and monasteries, until the independence of Romania from the Ottoman Empire on 9 May 1877. They were considered less valuable because they were taxable, only skilled at agricultural work and could not be used as tribute. It was common for both boyars and monasteries to register their Romanian serfs as "Gypsies" so that they would not pay the taxes that were imposed on the serfs. Any Romanian, regardless of gender, marrying a Roma would immediately become a slave that could be used as tribute.

=== Slavery in Russia ===
In Kievan Rus' and the Russian principalities, the slaves were usually classified as kholops. A kholop's master had unlimited power over his life: he could kill him, sell him, or use him as payment upon a debt. The master, however, was responsible before the law for his kholop's actions. A person could become a kholop as a result of capture, selling himself or herself, being sold for debts or committed crimes, or marriage to a kholop. Until the late 10th century, the kholops represented a majority among the servants who worked lordly lands.

By the 16th century, slavery in Russia consisted mostly of those who sold themselves into slavery owing to poverty. They worked predominantly as household servants, among the richest families, and indeed generally produced less than they consumed. Laws forbade the freeing of slaves in times of famine, to avoid feeding them, and slaves generally remained with the family a long time; the Domostroy, an advice book, speaks of the need to choose slaves of good character and to provide for them properly. Slavery remained a major institution in Russia until 1723, when Peter the Great converted the household slaves into house serfs. Russian agricultural slaves were formally converted into serfs earlier in 1679.

In 1382, the Golden Horde under Tokhtamysh sacked Moscow, burning the city and carrying off thousands of inhabitants as slaves. For years, the khanates of Kazan and Astrakhan routinely made raids on Russian principalities for slaves and to plunder towns. Russian chronicles record about 40 raids of Kazan khans on Russian territories in the first half of the 16th century. In 1521, the combined forces of Crimean khan Mehmed I Giray and his Kazan allies attacked Moscow and captured thousands of slaves. About 30 major Tatar raids were recorded into Muscovite territories between 1558 and 1596. In 1571, the Crimean Tatars attacked and sacked Moscow, burning everything but the Kremlin and taking thousands of captives as slaves for the Crimean slave trade. In Crimea, about 75% of the population consisted of slaves.

=== Slavery in Poland and Lithuania ===
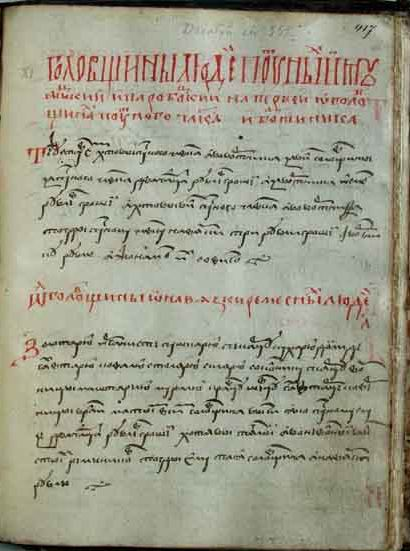
Statutes of Lithuania banned slavery, 1529

Slavery in Poland existed on the territory of Kingdom of Poland during the times of the Piast dynasty; however, slavery was restricted to those captured during war. In some special cases and for limited periods serfdom was also applied to debtors.

Slavery was banned officially in 1529 and prohibition on slavery was one of the most important of the Statutes of Lithuania, which had to be implemented before the Grand Duchy of Lithuania could join the Polish–Lithuanian Commonwealth in 1569.

The First Statute was drafted in 1522 and came into power in 1529 by the initiative of the Lithuanian Council of Lords. It has been proposed that the codification was initiated by Grand Chancellor of Lithuania Mikołaj Radziwiłł as a reworking and expansion of the 15th century Casimir's Code.

=== Slavery in Scandinavia ===
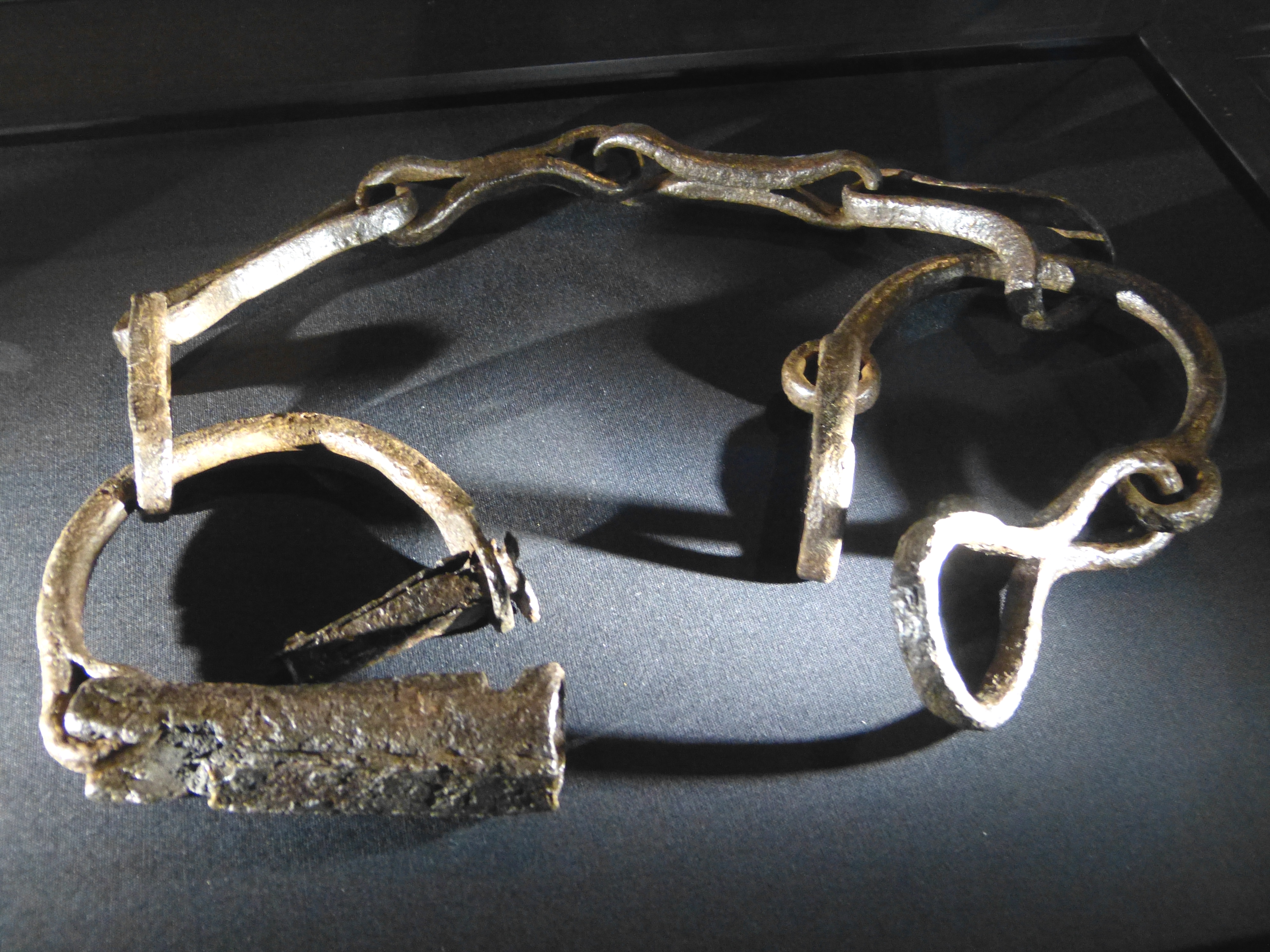
Viking-era slave chains

The evidence indicates that slavery in Scandinavia was more common in southern regions, as there are fewer northern provincial laws that contain mentions of slavery. Likewise, slaves were likely numerous but consolidated under the ownership of elites as chattel labor on large farm estates.

The laws from 12th and 13th centuries describe the legal status of two categories. According to the Norwegian Gulating code (in about 1160), domestic slaves could not, unlike foreign slaves, be sold out of the country. This and other laws defined slaves as their master's property at the same level as cattle; if either were harmed then the perpetrator was responsible for damages, but if either caused damage to property then the owners were held accountable. It also described a procedure for giving a slave their freedom. According to the Law of Scania slaves could be granted freedom or redeem it themselves, upon which they must then be accepted into a new kin group or face societal ostracization.

The Law of Scania indicates free men may become slaves as a way to atone for a crime with the implication they would be eventually freed. Likewise, the Gotlander Guta Lag indicates slavery could be for a fixed period and as a method to pay for debt. Within the Older Västgöta Law widows are only allowed to remarry if an enslaved fostre or fostra could manage the farm in her absence. Likewise, the Younger Västgöta Law indicates further trust for fostre and fostra as they could occasionally be entrusted with the master's keys. Likewise, some fostre were in such a trusted position they could undertake military actions while a slave. Yet, for all their independence, any children of fostre or fostra were still property of their masters.

A freed slave did not have full legal status; for example, the punishment for killing a former slave was low. A former slave's son also had a low status, but higher than that of his parents. Women were commonly taken as slaves and forced into concubinage for lords. The children of these women had little formal rights with inheritance and legitimacy possible should they be needed for succession or favored by their parents, but nothing was guaranteed.

Slavery began to be replaced by a feudal-style tenant farmer economy wherein free men tied to the land worked farms for a lord reducing the need for slaves The Norwegian law code from 1274, Landslov (Land's law), does not mention slaves, but former slaves. Thus it seems that slavery was abolished in Norway by this time. In Denmark, slavery was gradually replaced by serfdom (hoveriet) in the 13th century, and in Sweden, slavery was abolished in 1334 and not replaced with serfdom, which never existed in Sweden.

=== Slavery in the British Isles ===
British Wales and Gaelic Ireland and Scotland were among the last areas of Christian Europe to give up their institution of slavery. Under Gaelic custom, prisoners of war were routinely taken as slaves. During the period that slavery was disappearing across most of Western Europe, it was reaching its height in the British Isles: with the Viking invasions and the subsequent warring between Scandinavians and the natives, the number of captives taken as slaves drastically increased. The Irish church was vehemently opposed to slavery and blamed the 1169 Norman invasion on divine punishment for the practice, along with local acceptance of polygyny and divorce.

=== Slavery in France ===
During the Middle Ages, chattel slavery was legal in France itself. In the early Merovingian Middle Ages, there was a trade in slaves from the British Isles to France. In the Frankish Middle Ages, France served as a middle station in the saqaliba slave trade of Pagan slaves from Northeastern Europe to al-Andalus in the Southwest, which were transported from Prague to the Caliphate of Cordoba via France.

Chattel slavery in France gradually transitioned to serfdom and was finally abolished in the 1310s, specifically with a decree in 1315.

== Serfdom versus slavery ==
In considering how serfdom evolved from slavery, historians who study the divide between slavery and serfdom encounter several issues of historiography and methodology. Some historians believe that slavery transitioned into serfdom (a view that has only been around for the last 200 years), though there is disagreement among them regarding how rapid this transition was. Pierre Bonnassie, a medieval historian, thought that the chattel slavery of the ancient world ceased to exist in the Europe of the 10th century and was followed by feudal serfdom. Jean-Pierre Devroey thinks that the shift from slavery to serfdom was gradual as well in some parts of the continent. Other areas, though, did not have what he calls "western-style serfdom" after the end of slavery, such as the rural areas of the Byzantine Empire, Iceland, and Scandinavia. Complicating this issue is that regions in Europe often had both serfs and slaves simultaneously. In Northwestern Europe, a transition from slavery to serfdom happened by the 12th century. The Catholic Church promoted the transformation by giving the example. Enslavement of fellow Catholics was prohibited in 992 and manumission was declared to be a pious act. However it remained legal to enslave people of other religions and dogmas.

Generally speaking, regarding how slaves differed from serfs, the underpinnings of slavery and serfdom are debated as well. Dominique Barthélemy, among others, has questioned the very premises for neatly distinguishing serfdom from slavery, arguing that a binary classification masks the many shades of servitude. Of particular interest to historians is the role of serfdom and slavery within the state, and the implications that held for both serf and slave. Some think that slavery was the exclusion of people from the public sphere and its institutions, whereas serfdom was a complex form of dependency that usually lacked a codified basis in the legal system. Wendy Davies argues that serfs, like slaves, also became excluded from the public judicial system and that judicial matters were attended to in the private courts of their respective lords.

Despite the scholarly disagreement, it is possible to piece together a general picture of slavery and serfdom. Slaves typically owned no property, and were in fact the property of their masters. Slaves worked full-time for their masters and operated under a negative incentive structure; in other words, failure to work resulted in physical punishment. Serfs held plots of land, which was essentially a form of "payment" that the lord offered in exchange for the serf's service. Serfs worked part-time for the masters and part-time for themselves and had opportunities to accumulate personal wealth that often did not exist for the slave.

Slaves were generally imported from foreign countries or continents, via the slave trade. Serfs were typically indigenous Europeans and were not subject to the same involuntary movements as slaves. Serfs worked in family units, whereas the concept of family was generally murkier for slaves. At any given moment, a slave's family could be torn apart via trade, and masters often used this threat to coerce compliant behavior from the slave.

The end of serfdom is also debated, with Georges Duby pointing to the early 12th century as a rough end point for "serfdom in the strict sense of the term". Other historians dispute this assertion, citing discussions and the mention of serfdom as an institution during later dates (such as in 13th century England, or in Central Europe, where the rise of serfdom coincided with its decline in Western Europe). There are several approaches to get a time span for the transition, and lexicography is one such method. There is supposedly a clear shift in diction when referencing those who were either slaves or serfs at approximately 1,000, though there is not a consensus on how significant this shift is, or if it even exists.

In addition, numismatists shed light on the decline of serfdom. There is a widespread theory that the introduction of currency hastened the decline of serfdom because it was preferable to pay for labor rather than depend on feudal obligations. Some historians argue that landlords began selling serfs their land – and hence, their freedom – during periods of economic inflation across Europe. Other historians argue that the end of slavery came from the royalty, who gave serfs freedom through edicts and legislation in an attempt to broaden their tax base.

The absence of serfdom in some parts of medieval Europe raises several questions. Devroey thinks it is because slavery was not born out of economic structures in these areas, but was rather a societal practice. Heinrich Fichtenau points out that in Central Europe, there was not a labor market strong enough for slavery to become a necessity.

== Justifications for slavery ==
In late Rome, the official attitude toward slavery was ambivalent. According to Justinian's legal code, slavery was defined as "an institution according to the law of nations whereby one person falls under the property rights of another, contrary to nature".

Justifications for slavery throughout the medieval period were dominated by the perception of religious difference. Slaves were often outsiders taken in war. As such, Hebrew and Islamic thinking both conceived of the slave as an "enemy within". In the Christian tradition, pagans and heretics were similarly considered enemies of the faith who could be justly enslaved. In theory, slaves who converted could embark on the path to freedom, but practices were inconsistent: masters were not obliged to manumit them and the practice of baptising slaves was often discouraged. The enslavement of co-religionists was discouraged, if not forbidden, for Christians, Jews, and Muslims alike. Consequently, northern European pagans and black Africans were a target for all three religious groups. Ethnic and religious difference were conflated in the justification of slavery.

A major Christian justification for the use of slavery, especially against those with dark skin, was the Curse of Ham. The Curse of Ham refers to a biblical parable (Gen. 9:20–27) in which Ham, the son of Noah, sins by seeing his father inebriated and naked, although scholars differ on the exact nature of Ham's transgression. Noah then curses Ham's offspring, Canaan, with being a "servant of servants unto his brethren". Although race or skin color is not mentioned, many Jewish, Christian and Muslim scholars began to interpret the passage as a curse of both slavery and black skin, in an attempt to justify the enslavement of people of color, specifically those of African descent. In the medieval period, however, it was also used by some Christians as a justification for serfdom. Muslim sources in the 7th century allude to the Curse of Ham gaining relevance as a justifying myth for the Islamic world's longstanding enslavement of Africans.

The apparent discrepancy between the notion of human liberty founded in natural law and the recognition of slavery by canon law was resolved by a legal "compromise": enslavement was allowable given a just cause, which could then be defined by papal authority. The state of slavery was thought to be closely tied to original sin. Towards the middle of the 15th century, the Catholic Church, in particular the Papacy, took an active role in offering justifications for the enslavement of Saracens, pagans, infidels, and "other enemies of Christ". In 1452, a papal bull entitled Dum Diversas authorized King Afonso V of Portugal to enslave any "Saracens" or "pagans" he encountered. The Pope, Pope Nicholas V, recognized King Alfonso's military action as legitimate in the form of the papal bull, and declared the

full and free power, through the Apostolic authority by this edict, to invade, conquer, fight, and subjugate the Saracens and pagans, and other infidels and other enemies of Christ, and ... to reduce their persons into perpetual servitude ...

In a follow-up bull, released in 1455 and entitled Romanus Pontifex, Pope Nicholas V reiterated his support for the enslavement of infidels in the context of Portugal's monopoly on North African trade routes.

Historians such as Timothy Rayborn have contended that religious justifications served to mask the economic necessities underlying the institution of slavery.

== See also ==
- That Most Precious Merchandise: The Mediterranean Trade in Black Sea Slaves, 1260-1500
- Catholic Church and slavery
- Christianity and slavery
- History of slavery
- Islamic views on slavery
- Slavery in ancient Greece
- Slavery in ancient Rome
- Slavery in antiquity
- The Bible and slavery

== Sources ==
- Barker, Hannah (2019). That Most Precious Merchandise: The Mediterranean Trade in Black Sea Slaves, 1260–1500. University of Pennsylvania Press. doi:10.9783/9780812296488. ISBN 9780812296488. S2CID 219875156.
- Phillips, William D. (1985). Slavery from Roman Times to the Early Transatlantic Trade. Manchester University Press. ISBN 978-0-7190-1825-1.
- Phillips, William D. (2014). Slavery in Medieval and Early Modern Iberia. University of Pennsylvania Press. ISBN 978-0-8122-4491-5.
