= Veldamas =

Veldamas (plural: veldamai) was a form of landownership in the early stages of Lithuanian serfdom. The term describes a peasant family with its land and other belongings granted by the Grand Duke of Lithuania to his loyal followers, usually as a reward for military service. The peasant retained ownership of his property, including land, but owed taxes and levies imposed by the noble. Veldamas was a middle stage between laukininkas (a free peasant) and a serf. The term veldamas is derived from Lithuanian word veldėti, valda and means "to rule something". East Slavic texts of the Grand Duchy loaned the word as велдомы (plural; singular: велдом). The term gradually disappeared after the Volok Reform in 1557, but it was still used in Postilė by Mikalojus Daukša (1599) to denote a subordinate.

== Rights ==
Veldamai were different from kaimynai, a class of peasants also under control of the nobles, as kaimynai did not own their land and had to rent it from the nobles. Veldamai had some personal freedoms and rights. Their daughters could marry anyone their families approved upon a payment of kriena, a wedding tribute to the noble. The nobles could not usurp their property, including land, animals, and tools, or transform them into a šeimynykštis, a type of patrimonial slaves. The nobles could not buy or exchange veldamai without official approval from the Grand Duke of his officials. A series of privileges to the nobles restricted veldamai right to move or buy their freedom: they could not leave to estates of other nobles or of the Grand Duke. The nobles were also granted the right to decide court trials involving veldamai as the Grand Duke promised not to interfere. These privileges were the legal basis for serfdom.

== Evolution ==
The practice was initiated by Grand Dukes Jogaila and Skirgaila, but gained popularity under Vytautas the Great in early 15th century. This coincided with growing demand for agricultural products prompted by developing cities in Western Europe. Noblemen–soldiers shifted to noblemen–landlords. Soldiers were no longer satisfied with sharing spoils of war and demanded land ownership, which would provide steady income during years of peace. Vytautas put veldamai system into use when he centralized the state by replacing local princes with loyal governors, owning their fortune to the Grand Duke. Persons awarded veldamai became members of the Lithuanian nobility. Some veldamai were also gifted to churches.

Veldamai were put into difficult position as they owed taxes both to the state (sidabrinė – tax in silver and dėkla – tax in grain) and their local noble. A series of privileges by the Grand Dukes (by Sigismund Kęstutaitis in 1434, Casimir IV Jagiellon in 1447, Alexander Jagiellon in 1492, Sigismund I the Old in 1507) released veldamai from their taxes to the state. All the income veldamai produced was owned by the noble, but veldamai retained other duties to the state, like building and repairing roads, bridges, or castles. The first Statute of Lithuania (1529) confirmed the privileges granted to the nobles and discontinued the tradition of creating new veldamai. In 1547 peasants lost the right to buy or sell their land. Eventually, Volok Reform, begun in 1557, established full-scale serfdom in the Grand Duchy. Differences between šeimynykštis, kaimynas, and veldamas disappeared.
