= Ennoblement =

Induction of an individual into the noble class

Ennoblement is the conferring of nobility—the induction of an individual into the noble class. Currently only a few kingdoms still grant nobility to people; among them Spain, the United Kingdom, Belgium and the Vatican. Depending on time and region, various laws have governed who could be ennobled and how. Typically, nobility was conferred on individuals who had assisted the sovereign. In some countries (e.g. France under the Ancien Régime), this degenerated into the buying of patents of nobility, whereby rich commoners (e.g. merchants) could purchase a title of nobility.

== Ennobling qualities ==
Medieval theorists of nobility relied on earlier classical concepts (Platonic, Aristotelian and Christian-Hellenistic) of what personal traits and virtues constitute grounds for ennoblement. In Plato's Republic, he provides for promotion and degradation of citizens according to a strict spiritual meritocracy. In the words of Will Durant, "If the ruler's son is a dolt he falls at the first shearing; if the boot-black's son is a man of ability the way is clear for him to become a guardian of the state" (Durant, The Story of Philosophy, 1961, p. 28). In medieval times, heraldic writers cited biblical examples to demonstrate that nobility is not just a matter of descent but of personal virtue: Shem, Ham and Japheth sprang from the same father, yet Ham was ignoble and King David rose from shepherd to become king through sheer faith and soldierly courage. Bartolus defined natural nobility by reference to Aristotle, who in his Politics explains how some are marked out for freedom by their virtues (and specifically by their capacity to rule), and are so distinguished from the mass of men whose talents fit them only for a servile role. Those free men whose virtues thus fit them to rule Bartolus defines as the natural nobility. With regard to natural nobility, Bartolus applauded Dante Alighieri's argument in his Convivio that nobility does not derive from ancient riches adorned with fine manners, but is the meed of individual virtue. Bartolus argues that the prince should strive to make his dominion a true mirror of God's own by advancing only those who are naturally noble (see Maurice Keen, Chivalry, p. 149). Geoffroi de Charny, the noted celebrant of knighthood, argued "God will mark out those who labor valorously, even though they come of little estate" (Livre de chevalrie, in Oeuvres de Froissart, ed. K. de Lettenhove I, pt. iii, 494, 495). During the Renaissance, the Platonic-Christian humanist belief in virtue as the essence of nobility was summed up in the Latin phrase: Virtus vera nobilitas est (Virtue is the True Nobility). The counter-revolutionary author Edmund Burke wrote on merit-based promotion: "...the road to eminence and power, from obscure condition, ought not to be made too easy, nor a thing too much of course. If rare merit be the rarest of all rare things, it ought to pass through some sort of probation. The temple of honor ought to be seated on an eminence. If it be opened through virtue, let it be remembered, too, that virtue is never tried but by some difficulty and some struggle." Napoleon Bonaparte and Friedrich Nietzsche were later to continue the tradition of promoting a vision of aristocratic meritocracy, although no longer within (and opposed to) the Catholic-chivalric framework.

== Kingdom of Poland ==
In the Kingdom of Poland and later in the Polish–Lithuanian Commonwealth, ennoblement (nobilitacja) meant an individual's joining the szlachta (Polish nobility). At first it was granted by the monarch, since the late 16th century by the sejm that gave the ennobled person a coat of arms. Often that person could join an existing noble szlachta family with their own coat of arms (heraldic adoption). The increase of number of Polish nobility by trustworthy ennoblements was proportionally minimal since the 14th century.

== Grand Duchy of Lithuania ==
In the late 14th century, in the Grand Duchy of Lithuania, Vytautas the Great reformed the Grand Duchy's army: instead of calling all men to arms, he created forces comprising professional warriors—bajorai ("nobles"; see the cognate "boyar"). As there were not enough nobles, Vytautas trained suitable men, relieving them of labor on the land and of other duties; for their military service to the Grand Duke, they were granted land that was worked by hired men (veldamas). The newly formed noble families generally took up, as their family names, the Lithuanian pagan given names of their ennobled ancestors; this was the case with the Goštautai, Radvilos, Astikai, Kęsgailos and others. These families were granted their coats of arms under the Union of Horodło (1413).

In 1506, King Sigismund I the Old confirmed the position of the Lithuanian Council of Lords in state politics and limited entry into the nobility.

== Russian Empire ==
After the reforms of Tsar Peter the Great in the early 18th century, noblemen in Russia were obliged to serve as civil or military officials. Personal nobility was automatically conferred on all civil and military officials starting with the corresponding rank of captain. Hereditary nobility was conferred on all officials with the rank of colonel (any given military post had an equivalent civil one, rank-wise). The system was later extended to merchants and industrialists that with a successful career managing a business of reasonably large size would achieve personal or hereditary nobility.

== See also ==
- Battlefield commission, modern equivalent to ennoblement for valor or knighting on the battleground in the ancien régime
- Fount of honour
- Gaetano Mosca's sociological concept of the "circulation of elites"
- Meritocracy, or political order "open to talents"
- Novus homo
- Peerage
- Promotion (rank)
- Social mobility
