= Casimir's Code =

1468 Lithuanian legal code

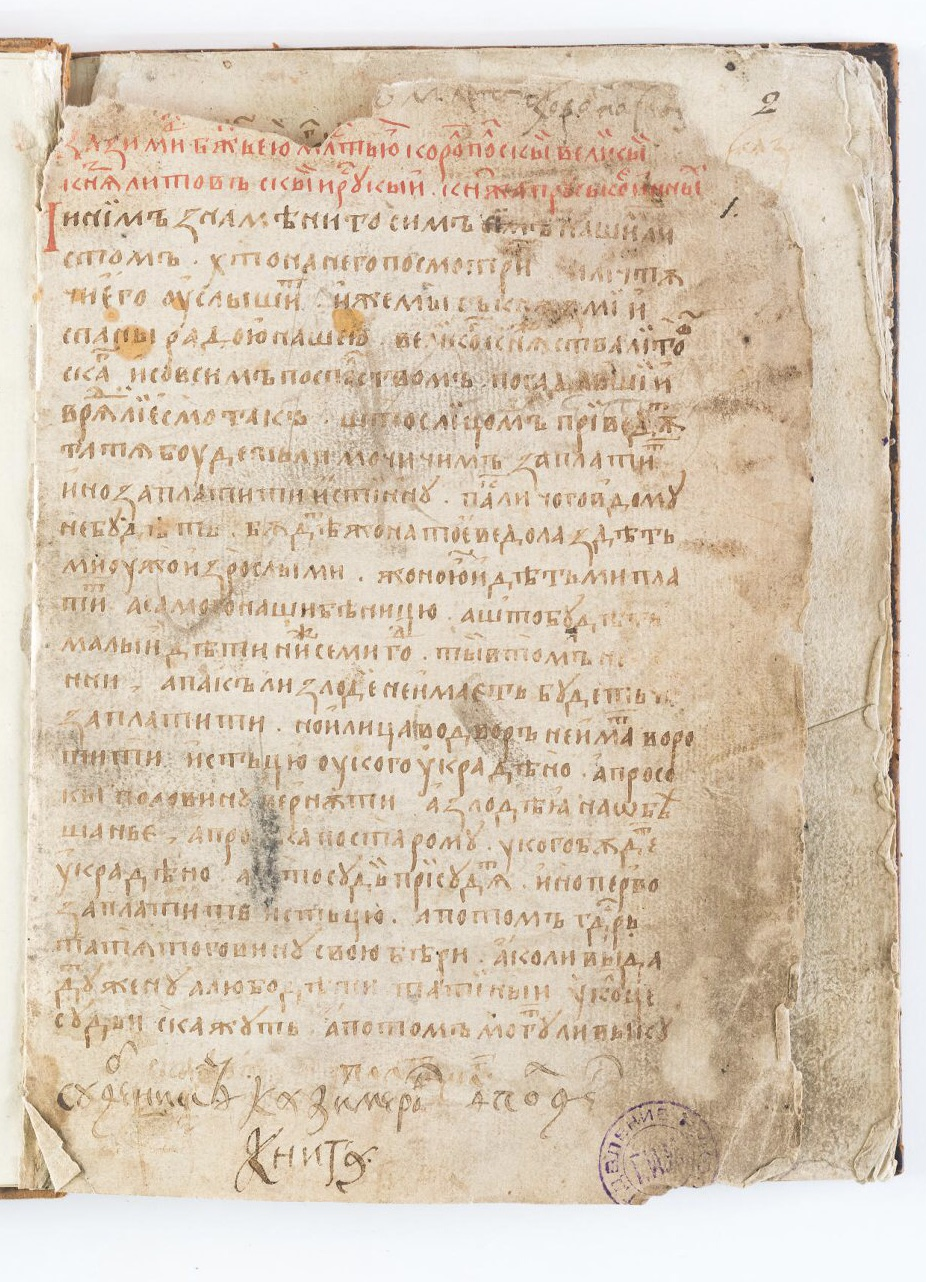
- Sheet from the Russian Museum
- Presented: 1468

Casimir's Code (Belarusian: Судзебнік Казіміра; Lithuanian: Kazimiero teisynas; Polish: Statut Kazimierza), also known as the Sudebnik of 1468, was a legal code adopted by Grand Duke of Lithuania and King of Poland Casimir IV Jagiellon with the approval of the Lithuanian Council of Lords. It was the first attempt to codify the laws of the Grand Duchy of Lithuania. The code prescribed punishment for property crimes and limited court procedures. Much of the legal system was left uncodified and was governed by customs.

The manuscript is now in the State Historical Museum in Moscow, as MS Uvar. 702-4°.

== Context ==
The date or the circumstances when the code was adopted are unknown. The historians conjured that the most probable date is February 1468 when the Seimas of the Grand Duchy of Lithuania met in Vilnius. The code differed from privileges previously issued by the Grand Duke because the code granted no new rights to the nobility. Judging from the content, the code was intended for the nobility and landowners, who received Casimir's privilege in 1447 to try veldamai, a class of dependent people that eventually became serfs. The code attempted to impose some consistency in the treatment of veldamai. The document also did not specify the effective date or territory. Historians believe that the code was in effect in entire Lithuania up to the first Statute of Lithuania of 1529 even though no court cases are known that referenced the code.

Written in the Ruthenian language, the original document did not survive, but several copies are known from the end of 15th and beginning of the 16th centuries. The document was first published in 1826 by Ignacy Daniłowicz, law professor at Vilnius University. The document did not have a proper name and was named Casimir's Code or Casimir's Statute by modern historians. The original code was not divided into articles; modern historians have identified 25 articles.

== Content ==
The code prescribed various punishments for crimes and some court procedures. It dealt only with crimes against property (theft and robbery). The code primarily dealt with common thieves, but also addressed crimes by the Lithuanian nobility (such as cutting forest trees without permission or luring away veldamai from another noble). The nobility was to be tried and sentenced by the Grand Duke and the Council of Lords. Civil disputes between nobles were to be decided by the third-party judges. Peasants dependent on the Grand Duke were to be tried by tijūnai (high-ranking supervisors of royal estates), while those dependent on other dukes and nobles – by the nobles themselves or their appointed officials.

A criminal first had to compensate the victim for the material losses (the stolen object was usually not returned to the victim, but transferred to the court). The code devoted special attention to this issue. Then criminal was subject to the actual punishment. There were four types of punishments: the stolen object was confiscated for the benefit of the court; if the object was not available, it was replaced by other compensation of equal value; flogging and putting into stocks; hanging. The death sentence was limited to repeated offenders, thefts of cows and horses, and other crimes that exceeded a certain monetary limit. The responsibility for the crimes did not extend to family members unless they knew or participated in the theft.
