= Kaimynas =

Kaimynas (plural: kaimynai) was a class of non-free peasants in the Grand Duchy of Lithuania before full-scale serfdom was established by the Wallach reform (1557). The term describes a former prisoner of war, who was allowed to live in a village and rent a piece of land from a noble. Peasants who lost their land because of debt or other circumstances could also become kaimynai.

Kaimynai and their families were allowed to form a farm, have tools, and earn their own living independently. However they had no personal freedoms and were dependent on the nobles. Because the family was treated as a single farm and owned taxes and levies as a group and not individually, kaimynai were sold or exchanged in families. Their situation was similar to that of šeimynykščiai as both classes were not free and dependent on the nobles. However, šeimynykščiai were members of noble's household and did not earn their living independently. They are often compared to slaves, while kaimynai are compared to early serfs.

The term is derived from possessive adjective to describe a person belonging to a village (kaimas) or farmstead (kiemas). In East Slavic texts loaned the word as коиминецъ, коиминикъ. In modern Lithuanian the term means neighbor.
