= Šeimynykštis =

Šeimynykštis (plural: šeimynykščiai) was a class of patriarchal slaves, who did the same job and lived under the same conditions as his master and family, in the early Grand Duchy of Lithuania. They had no personal freedoms and were completely dependent on the master. Unlike kaimynas, šeimynykštis did not rent land and earn their living independently. Rather, they were members of the noble's household (the term is related to the word šeima – family).

Some members of šeimynykščiai, called bernai or parobkai, would receive a small piece of land, called banda, and would be allowed to establish their own farm. Such arrangement was very similar to that of kaimynas, but bernai and their families were treated as individuals and not as a single group and thus could be separated and sold individually. By the end of the 16th century, when Wallach reform established full serfdom in Lithuania, few šeimynykščiai were left as they merged with other classes of serfs. Slavery officially ended in 1588. The households relied more on free paid laborers. Šeimynykščiai were important in the early stages of feudalism (13th – mid 14th centuries) as they helped to differentiate peasants from large landowners, the future nobles.
