= Lithuanian Council of Lords =

Government body in Grand Duchy of Lithuania

The Lithuanian Council of Lords (Lithuanian: Ponų taryba) was the main permanent institution of central government in the Grand Duchy of Lithuania active in its capital city of Vilnius.

It had originated from the advisory Council of the Grand Duke, established by Vytautas the Great in the early 15th century. During the reign of Casimir Jagiellon it was renamed to the Council of Lords. Under the Union of Lublin of 1569, the Council formally became a constituent part of the Polish–Lithuanian Senates (see also Offices in the Polish-Lithuanian Commonwealth), together with the Royal Council of Poland, but it continued to operate de facto until the mid-17th century.

== Competence ==
The Council carried out the functions of the Grand Duke after his death and had a supreme authority in the Grand Duchy of Lithuania until a new Grand Duke was appointed, as well as organised his appointment. The first appointed ruler was Casimir Jagiellon, who in exchange expanded the council's powers significantly and approved the Casimir Code. The council was granted judicial powers and became an appellate instance, subordinate to the King and acting in the absence of him, who remained the chief justice. Casimir was followed by his son Alexander who issued another privilege in 1492. According to the privilege of 1506 by his brother Sigismund the Old, the new laws could no longer be adopted and the existing could not be amended without the council's consent. The First Lithuanian Statute of 1529 confirmed its administrative powers, as well as granted legislative powers, exercised together with the Grand Duke of Lithuania. The council's legislative powers were limited under the subsequent edition of the Lithuanian Statute of 1566, as a result of a growing role of szlachta and its Sejms.

The Council carried out executive functions in the state since 1445 because most of Lithuanian Grand Dukes resided in Poland. It also convoked the Lithuanian Seimas.

== Composition ==
The council had 35 – 50 permanent members as of 1529. It consisted of the most prominent representatives of the Lithuanian magnate families, as well as bishops, marshals and treasurers. The ex officio members of the council were the voivodes of Vilnius and Trakai, castellans of Vilnius and Trakai, the Elder of Samogitia, the Grand Hetman of Lithuania and the Grand Chancellor of Lithuania. Since the 16th century, these members comprised a Secret Council which was a de facto core of the Council of Lords, dealing with all crucial state affairs, since the full membership of the council was rarely convened. A majority of the members were Roman Catholic ethnic Lithuanians; however, the influence of Ruthenian magnates was constantly increasing.

The highest ranked statesmen in the Lithuanian Council of Lords were voivodes of Vilnius and Trakai, while the Elders of Samogitia (self-elected by the Samogitian nobility and confirmed by the Grand Duke of Lithuania) were the third most important.

== Sources ==
- (in Lithuanian) The History of Lithuanian Seims from the official website of the Seimas (Lithuanian Parliament)

== See also ==
- Seimas
