= Volok Reform =

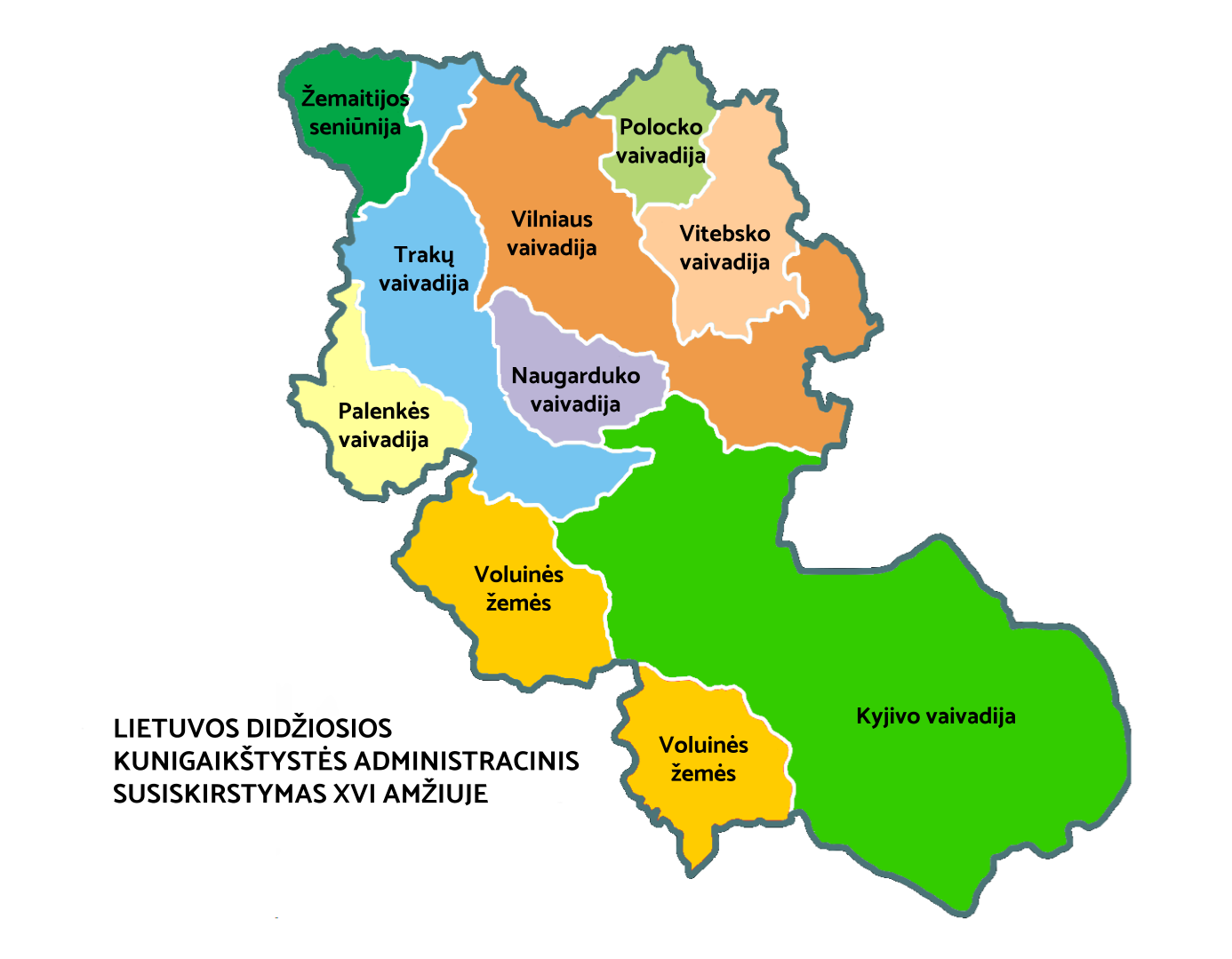
Map of Lithuania in the mid-16th century

The Volok Reform (Lithuanian: Valakų reforma; Belarusian: Валочная памера; Polish: reforma włóczna) was a 16th-century land reform in parts of the Grand Duchy of Lithuania (Lithuania proper, Duchy of Samogitia and parts of White Ruthenia). The reform was started by Grand Duchess Bona Sforza in her possessions to increase the revenues of the state treasury but soon was expanded statewide and was copied by other nobles and the Church. The reform increased effectiveness of agriculture by establishing a strict three-field system for crop rotation. The land was measured, registered in a cadastre, and divided into voloks (land unit of about 21.38 hectares (52.8 acres)). The reform was successful in terms of annual state revenue, which quadrupled from 20,000 to 82,000 kopas of Lithuanian groschens. In social terms, the reform and the accompanying Third Statute of Lithuania (1588), promoted development of manorialism and fully established serfdom in Lithuania which existed until the emancipation reform of 1861. The nobility was clearly separated from the peasants, severely limiting social mobility.

== Background ==
The beginnings of serfdom in Lithuania can be traced from the end of the 14th century when Grand Dukes would gift land and peasants, known as veldamai, to Lithuanian nobles for their military service (cf. benefice). The practice was particularly popular during the reign of Vytautas (reigned 1392–1430) and Casimir Jagiellon (reigned 1440–1492). Grand Dukes also issued a series of privileges transferring veldamai further under control of the nobles. That allowed the nobles to establish large estates that had up to a few hundred peasant households (for example, Upninkai and Musninkai of Radvilos). The wealthiest nobles became magnates. According to estimated by Jerzy Ochmański based on the military census of 1528, the magnates (less than 1% of nobility) controlled about 30% of nobility landholdings.

At the same time, there were significant developments in Western Europe. The Age of Discovery and Commercial Revolution shifted the economic initiative from agriculture to trade and industry. Merchants began focusing on importing raw materials and exporting finished goods. As a result, the demand for agricultural products, primarily grain, had increased. That presented an opportunity for the Lithuanian nobles. Their economic activity shifted from military service (taking share of war loot, receiving benefices from Grand Duke) to agriculture (growing and exporting grain to foreign markets). There were significant motivations to expand arable land and ensure cheap and permanent workforce.

== Reform ==
=== Bonfa Sforza reform ===
In 1519, Bona Sforza received her first estates in Lithuania from her husband, King of Poland and Grand Duke of Lithuania Sigismund I, in the form of the Duchies of Pinsk and Kobryn. In 1529, her son, Sigismund Augustus, was elevated to the position of Grand Duke of Lithuania, and Bona began, on his behalf, the process of consolidating the grand ducal domain, which was in a deplorable condition, having been largely taken over by the magnates. At the same time, she also started acquiring landed estates for her own personal domain.

Lithuanian villages were scattered, and their fields were irregularly laid out. Land dues were based on the sluzhba system, under which a group of households was collectively responsible for paying various levies. Bona recognized the inefficiency of this arrangement. She began replacing it with the hide system, already well established in Poland and Mazovia, which had been introduced to the Grand Duchy of Lithuania by Polish settlers in Podlasie. In Poland, the system was based on the łan, while in Mazovia it was organized around the włóka (volok). It was this latter version that was adapted and implemented in Lithuania.

In 1533 Bona gradually began transforming her Lithuanian estates along Polish lines. A single volok, measuring 30 morgs (approximately 21.3 hectares), was divided into three equal fields as part of a three-field crop rotation system. Common land was also designated for grazing and haymaking. The remaining land, known as zaścianek (literally “beyond the wall”), could be leased by peasants. In principle, each peasant household was entitled to receive one volok. In practice, however, wealthier peasants often acquired two or three voloks, while poorer ones cultivated only fractions of a volok. On average, a household held about 0.75 volok.

=== Grand ducal reform ===
The reform began in 1547 in the Grand Duke's lands. It was made a law on 1 April 1557 and the process continued until the 1580s. The commission headed by chancellor Mikołaj Radziwiłł the Black examined autids. The process of land redistribution was supervised by Piotr Chwalczewski, who came from Greater Poland. He headed a team of 64 surveyors. Thirty-five of them were local Lithuanians or Ruthenians, five were Jews, and the remainder were Poles or Masovians.

The Grand Duke was declared the owner of all peasants and their land thereby eliminating any remnants of allodial titles. The nobles that could not prove their noble status or land ownership had their land confiscated and their status reduced to a peasant. The Grand Duke's land was measured, evaluated for quality, and registered in a cadastre. In Samogitia and the Vilnius Voivodeship and Trakai Voivodeship, a total of 57,636 voloks and 9 morgs were reorganized, amounting to approximately 1.3 million hectares of land. By the end of the century, the reform had been extended to the remaining territories of the Grand Duchy of Lithuania. As a result, the revenues of the grand ducal domain increased substantially, from approximately 20,000 kop groszy before 1547 to 82,000 kop groszy in 1588, derived solely from the reorganized villages.

The land around the manor was assigned to folwark. Intruding parcels of land belonging to a noble were moved elsewhere to form a unified tract of land. This tract was then divided. The method of dividing land into voloks was similar to that introduced by Bona. Although the grand ducal volok was slightly larger, measuring 33 morgs (23.5 hectares). However, the reform also permitted the use of larger 36-morg and smaller 30-morg voloks. Regulations said that each volok of folwark should have seven peasant voloks. Land assigned to peasant farms (the village) was located further from the manor. The surveyors attempted to draw as correct rectangle as possible. Peasant houses were often moved to form a linear settlement along the single road. One of the villagers was appointed headman (wójt). His responsibilities included collecting dues, maintaining order, and overseeing land allotments. In return, he was granted two voloks free of charge and the right to lease one additional volok. The parish church received two or three voloks. Separate land allotments were also granted to craftsmen and to putni boyars.

Since land was owned by the Grand Duke, peasants had to perform services and pay dues to the landowner in exchange for their use of their farms. The unit of such services was one volok. The level of obligations depended on the quality of the land. The land was classified as good, medium, poor, and very poor. The rent amounted respectively to 106, 97, 83, and 66 groszy per year. Labour service obligations amounted respectively to 54, 45, and 31 days; the poorest land was not subject to labour service. Peasants had the right to redeem themselves from labour service for rent.

Although the reform introduced the folwark and a manorial economy, these did not come to dominate other forms of land cultivation. Only in the Knyszyn starostwo did more than half of the volokas belong to folwarks. Although the introduction of folwarks created a new class of cottars with small plots of land who worked on the estates, they did not originate from landless peasantry, but rather from free people without fixed status, immigrants, or former slaves. Importantly, the reform brought an end to slavery in Lithuania.
