= Statutes of Lithuania =

16th-century codification of legislation of the Grand Duchy of Lithuania

The Statutes of Lithuania, originally known as the Statutes of the Grand Duchy of Lithuania, were a 16th-century codification of all the legislation of the Grand Duchy of Lithuania and its successor, the Polish–Lithuanian Commonwealth. The Statutes consist of three legal codes (1529, 1566, and 1588), all written in Ruthenian, translated into Latin and later Polish. They formed the basis of the legal system of the Grand Duchy and were "the first full code of laws written in Europe since Roman Law" and "a major milestone inasmuch as it is the first attempt to codify significant East European legal trends". The Statutes evolved hand-in-hand with the Lithuanian expansion into Slavic lands, thus the main sources of the statutes were Ruthenian Laws, Baltic tribes had neither written culture nor systematic laws, while the Ruthenians published codified collections of law 5 centuries before the first statute of the Grand Duchy of Lithuania. Old Slavic customary law, as well as the nobility privileges in Poland, Magdeburg Rights, international treaties and royal charters and proclamations of the 12th to 14th centuries.

On 28 January 1588, Sigismund III Vasa had confirmed the Third Statute of Lithuania which stated that the Polish–Lithuanian Commonwealth is a federation of two countries – Poland and Lithuania where both countries have equal rights within it and separated the powers of the ruler, the Seimas, the executive and the courts (this for the first time in European history ensured the rule of law in the state, but Lithuania's citizens, who were subjects to the Statute, were only nobles). The Third Statute of Lithuania outlived the statehood of the Grand Duchy of Lithuania, which in 1795 was annexed by the Russian Empire after the Partitions of Polish-Lithuanian Commonwealth; it was abolished by the Russian tsarist authorities only on 7 July 1840.

== First and Second Statutes ==
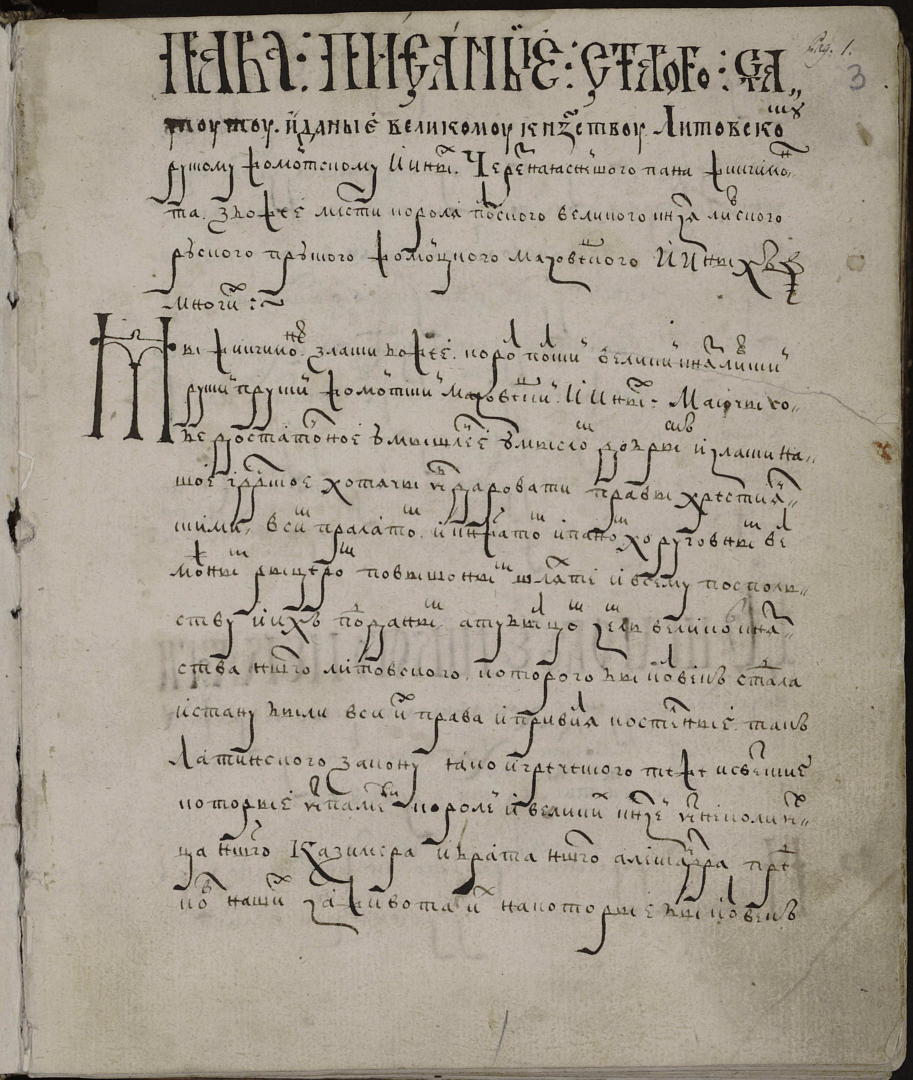
The first page of the First Statute

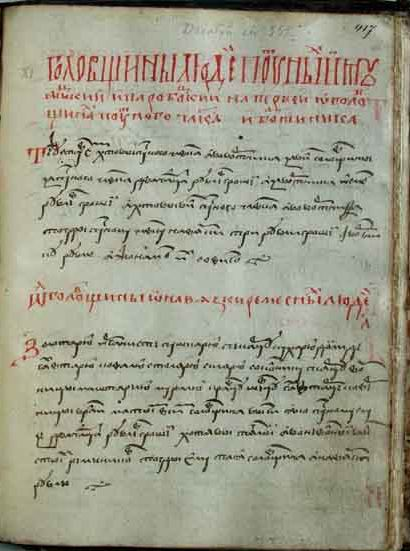
11th chapter of the First Statute, 1529

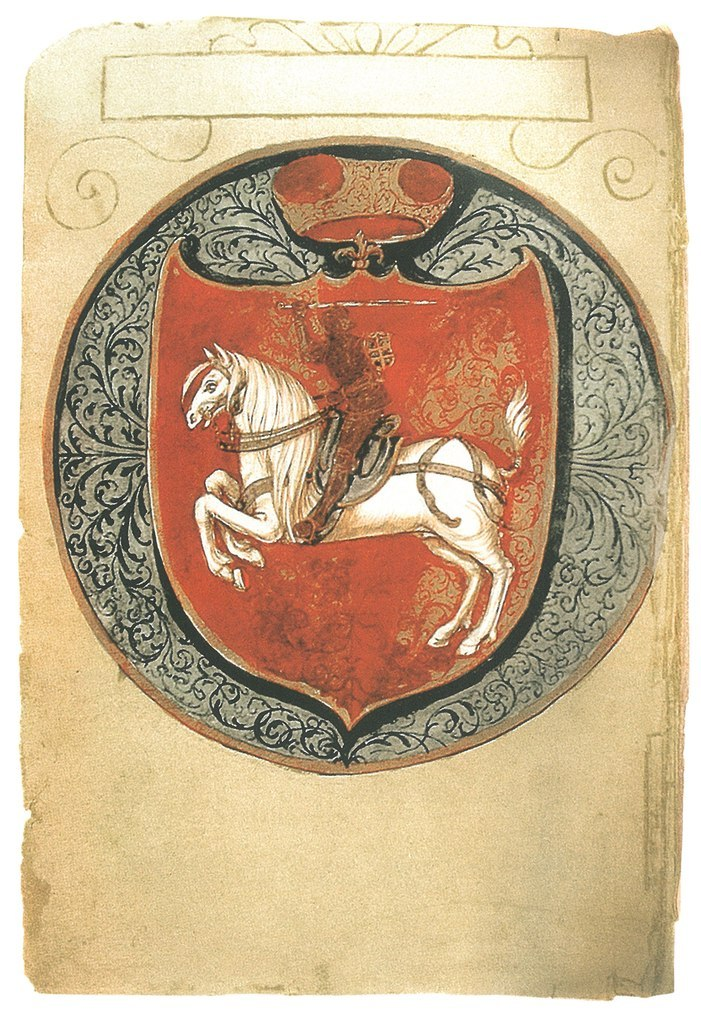
First page of the Latin copy of Laurentius (1531) of the First Statute

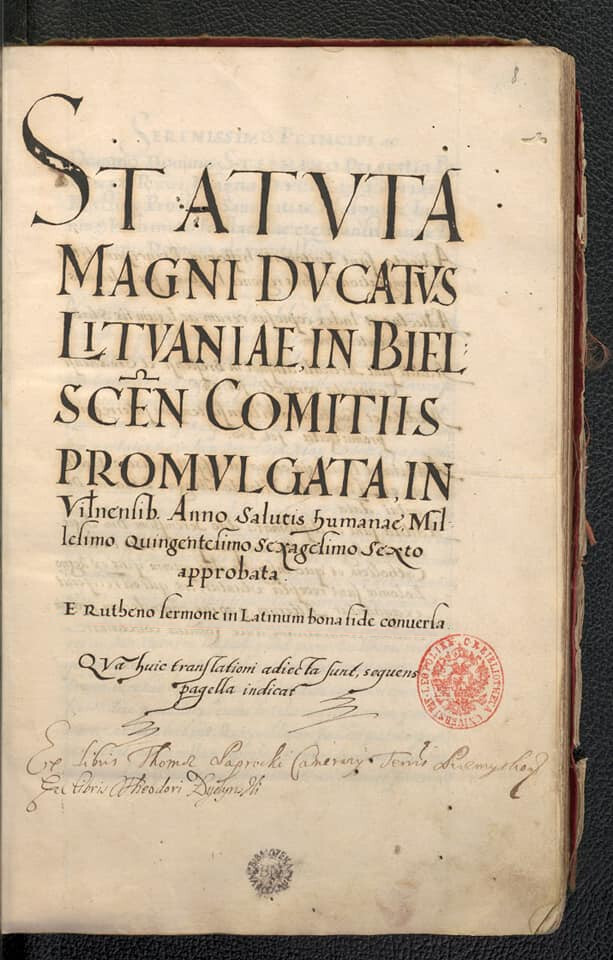
The Second Statute in Latin by Augustinus Rotundus, 1576

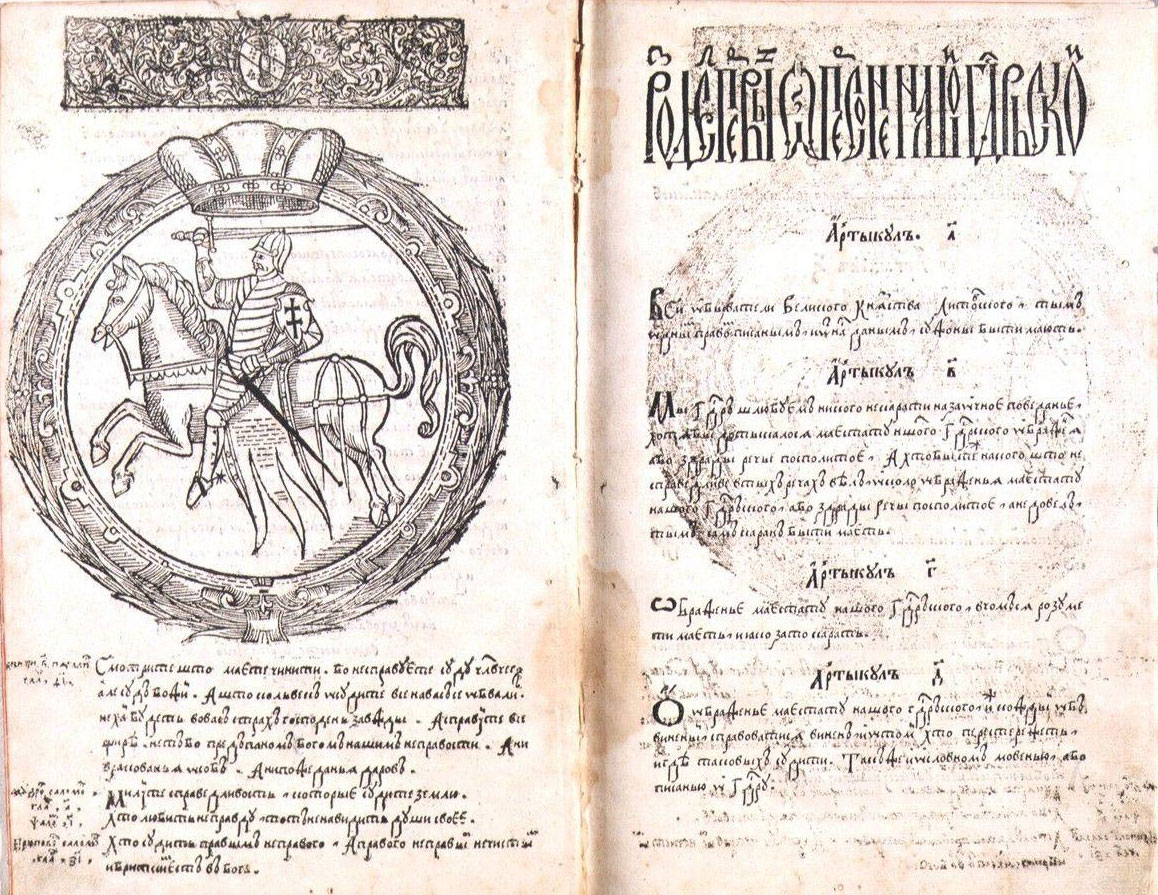
Page from the Second Statute, 1588

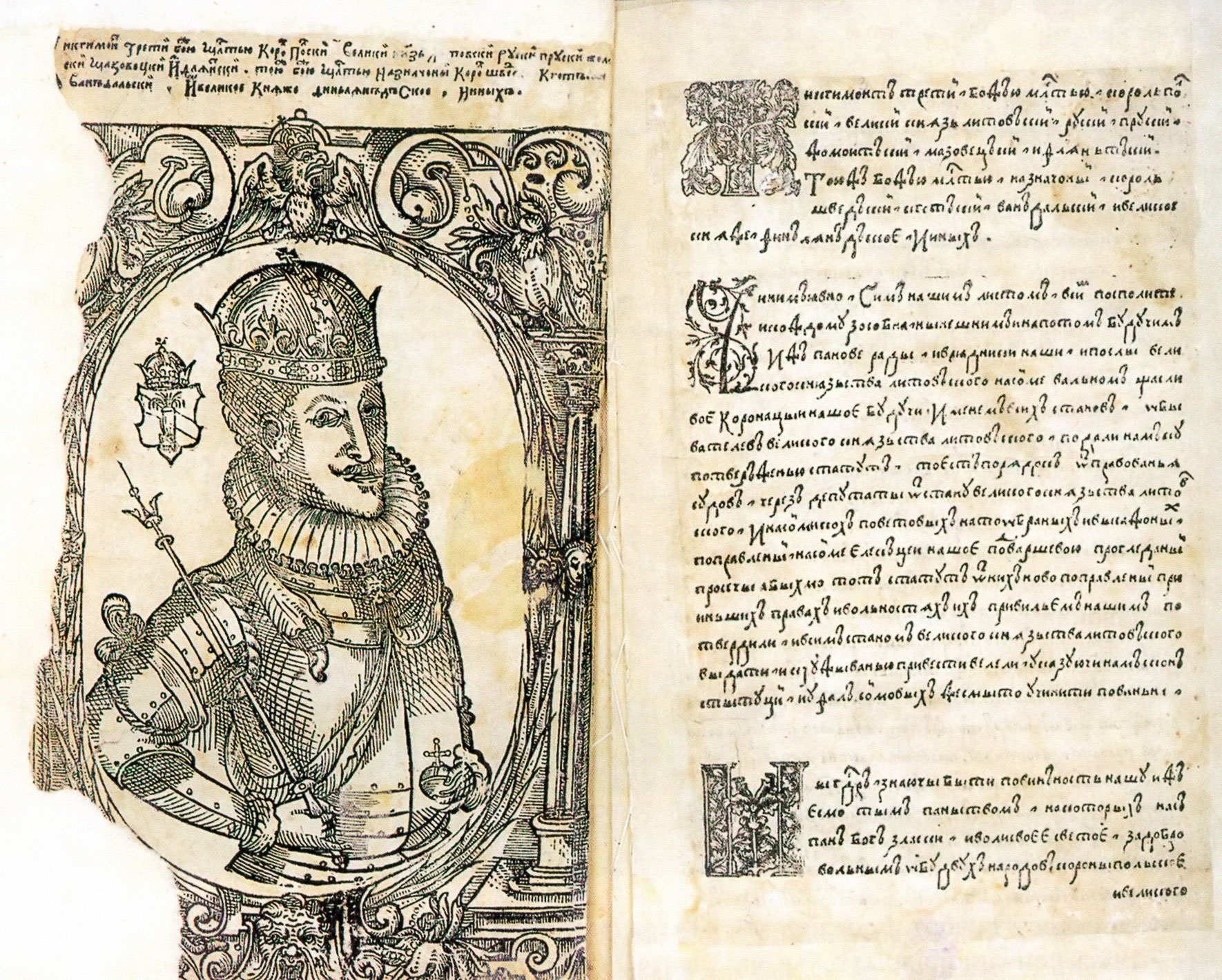
Page from the Second Statute, 1588

The main purpose of the First Statute was to standardize and unify the law, under one legal code, ending the prominent regional particularism. The unified law was supposed to act as a tool for better political and economic integration of the different regions.

Although general land privileges (obshchezemskie privilei) of 1447, 1492 and 1506 provided certain legal norms, as a rule, they did not cover more specific types of problems, such as procedure, punishment and other finer points of law. At the diet held in 1514, the delegates made the first request for laws and rights written down in a comprehensive code. After further repeated requests for such a code, a general diet was convened in the spring of 1522 for the discussion of provisions to be included in the first statute.

The First Statute was drafted in 1522 and came into force in 1529 by the initiative of the Lithuanian Council of Lords. It has been proposed that the codification was initiated by Grand Chancellor of Lithuania Mikołaj Radziwiłł as a reworking and expansion of the Casimir Code. The First Statute consisted of 13 Chapters and was divided into 282 Articles. The first edition was redrafted and completed by his successor Albertas Goštautas, who assumed the position of the Grand Chancellor of Lithuania in 1522.

The First Statute was hand-written and survived in several copies. The statutes of Lithuania were translated to Latin because of Latin's superior terminology and to avoid ambiguity. Augustinus Rotundus was the most active proponent of Latin usage in Lithuania.

The second statute came into effect in 1566 by the order of the King of Poland and Grand Duke of Lithuania, Sigismund II Augustus, and was larger and more advanced. The Grand Duke did this because of pressure from the Lithuanian nobility, as the expansion of nobles' rights since the publication of the first statute had made it redundant. The second statute was prepared by a special commission, consisting of ten members, appointed by the Grand Duke and the Council of Lords.

This Second Statute made the rights of Orthodox Christians and Catholics equal. It consisted of 14 Chapters and contained 367 Articles.

Since May 2024, a fair copy of the First Statute in Western Ruthenian, belonging to Albertas Goštautas, and a manuscript copy of Polish translation of the Second Statute are exhibited at a permanent exhibition in the Palace of the Commonwealth in Warsaw.

== Third Statute ==
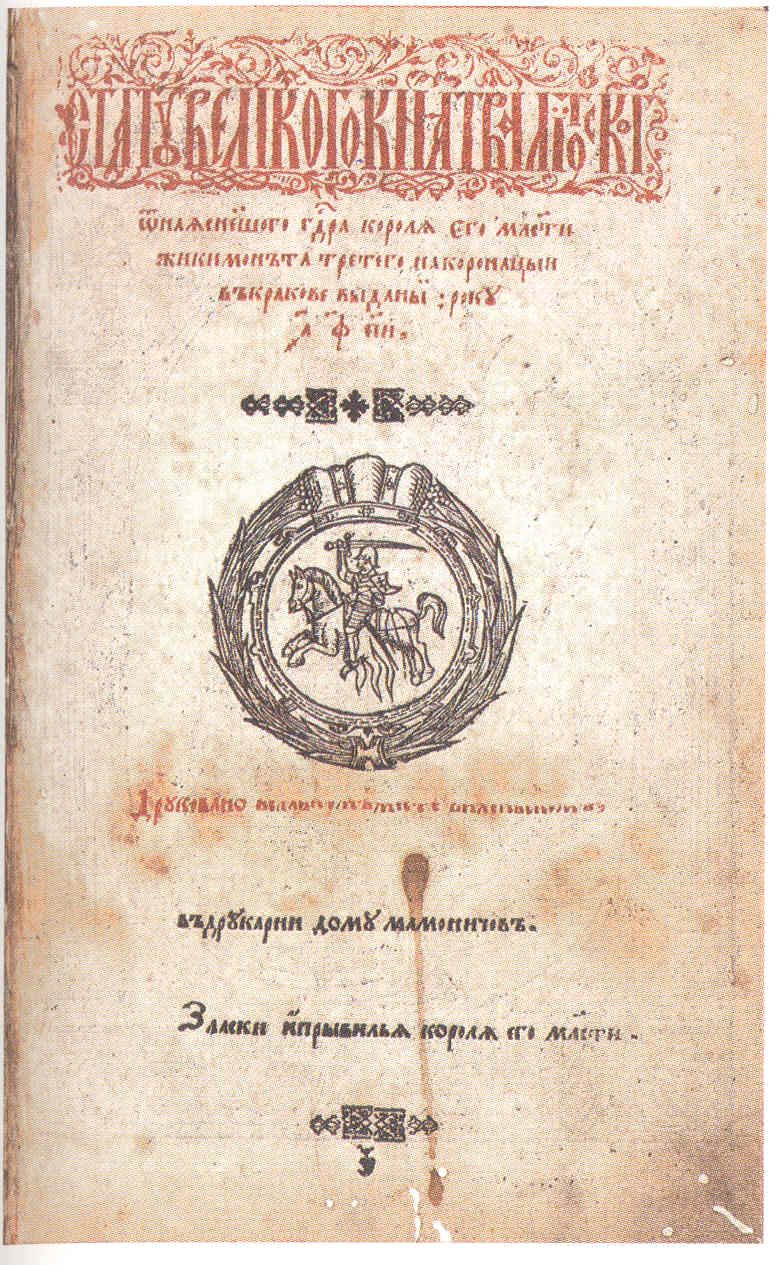
The Third Statute, 1588

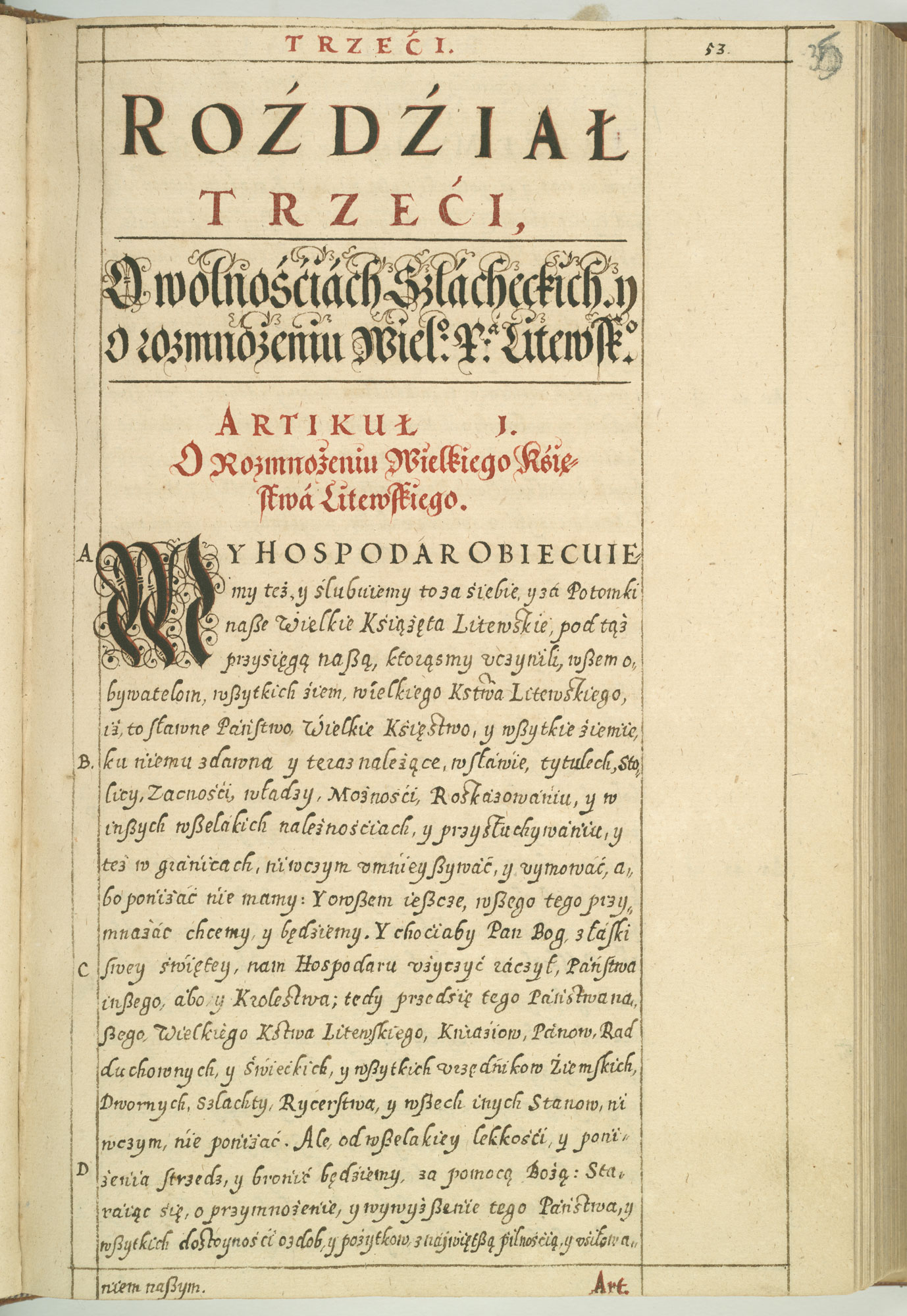
Polish translation of the Third Statute

The Third Statute, described as an "outstanding monument of the legal, literary and linguistic culture", was accepted in 1588 in response to the Union of Lublin, which created the Polish–Lithuanian Commonwealth. The main author and editor of this statute was the great Chancellor of Lithuania Lew Sapieha of Ruthenian origin. The statute was the first one to be printed (in contrast to the handwritten statutes before) in the Ruthenian language using the Cyrillic alphabet. Translations of the statute were printed in Russia and also in Poland, where at that time laws were not thoroughly codified and the Lithuanian statute was consulted in some cases where the corresponding or comparably similar Polish laws were unclear or missing.

The statute reorganized and modified existing laws and also included new laws. Novel features included a tendency toward severe penalties, including capital punishment, which was in line with the general reactionary retributive trend in contemporary European law (cf. Malleus Maleficarum). The statute also provided that crimes committed by or against people from different social ranks were punished alike, following the idea of equal worth of human life. Yet the hurdles for a peasant to have a noble tried and convicted were higher than the other way around. The statute was supported by Lithuanian magnates, as it granted them special powers and privileges allowing them to keep the lesser Lithuanian nobility and peasants in check. As a token for being acknowledged as Grand Duke of Lithuania, Sigismund III Vasa revised the Union of Lublin and approved the Third Lithuanian Statute.

Many features of the statute were not in line with the provisions of the Union of Lublin, which is not at all mentioned in the statute. The third article of the Statute provided that all lands of the Grand Duchy of Lithuania will be eternally within the Grand Duchy of Lithuania and never become part of other states. In this category fall e.g. the provisions about distributing local offices only to native people (or to people who had bought that status). So, too, do the many, detailed provisions about the Lithuanian estates' assemblies, which eventually were abolished by the Lublin union treaty. Thus, in everyday legal practice, the statute trumped and even usurped the union treaty.

A group often opposing the statute was the Polish nobility, which viewed such inconsistencies as unconstitutional, particularly since the Union of Lublin stipulated that no law could conflict with the law of the Union. The statute, however, in turn, declared the laws that conflicted with itself to be unconstitutional. Statutes of Lithuania were also used in territories of Lithuania annexed by Poland shortly before the Union of Lublin. These conflicts between statutory schemes in Lithuania and Poland persisted for many years.

The third variant of the Statute had particularly many humane features, such as a prohibition to enslave a free man for any crime; freedom of religion; and a recommendation to acquit the accused when there is a lack of evidence, instead of punishing the innocent. Also, it provided for double compensation for killing or hurting a woman. It was in force in the territory of Lithuania until 1840 when it was replaced by Russian laws. Until then, many Russian peasants and even nobles (e.g., Andrey Kurbsky) were fleeing from despotism in the neighboring Tsardom of Russia to Lithuania.

The Third Statute consisted of 14 chapters:

- Chapter 1. "O parsune nasshoj gospodarskoj" (On the status of Grand Duke of Grand Duchy of Lithuania).
- Chapter 2. "O oborone zemskoj" (On legal defence before courts).
- Chapter 3. "O volnostyah shlyahetskih i o rozmnozhen'yu Velikogo Knyazstva Litovskogo" (On noble privileges and on the development of the Grand Duchy of Lithuania).
- Chapter 4. "O sud'yah i sudeh" (On judges and courts of law).
- Chapter 5. "O oprave posagu i o vene" (On bride-prices).
- Chapter 6. "O opekah" (On trustees)
- Chapter 7. "O zapiseh i prodazheh" (On the conduct of business and taxes).
- Chapter 8. "O testamentah" (On last wills and testaments).
- Chapter 9. "O podkomoryh v poveteh i o pravah zemlenyh o granicah i mezhah" (On the subcamerarii in counties -ie. officials charged with overseeing land boundaries- and land rights and boundaries).
- Chapter 10. "O puschu, o lovy, o derevo bortnoe, o ozera i senozhaty" (On forests, hunting, trees used for honey hunting, on lakes and hayefields).
- Chapter 11. "O kgvalteh, o boeh, o golovschinah shlyahetskih" (On violations, fights and punishments of Szlachta)
- Chapter 12. "O golovschineh i o navezkah lyudej prostyh i o takih lyudeh i chelyadi, kotoraya ot panov svoih othodit, takzhe o slugah prikaznyh" (On the punishments and compensations of simple people and of such people and journeymen which leave their masters, also on servants).
- Chapter 13. "O grabezhah i navezkah" (On theft and robberies).
- Chapter 14. "O zlodejstve vsyakogo stanu" (On various frauds and wrong doings).

== Implications and developments ==
Copies of the statutes used to be kept in each powiat (district) so they could be used and seen by each person desiring to do so.

Attempts by the Lithuanian nobility to limit the power of Lithuanian magnates led to the equalization of laws movement, culminating in the reforms of the election sejm of 1697 (May–June), confirmed in the coronation sejm of September 1697 in the document Porządek sądzenia spraw w Trybunale Wielkiego Księstwa Litewskego. These reforms limited the jurisdiction and competency of several Lithuanian offices, such as those of the hetman, kanclerz (chancellor), marszałek (marshal) and podskarbi (under-treasurer), to equate them with those of the corresponding offices in the Polish crown. Many of these offices at the time were held by members of the Sapieha family, and the changes were at least partly made with a view to reducing their power. The reforms also instituted Polish as the administrative language, replacing Ruthenian, in written documents and court proceedings, contradicting the wording of the Third Statute.

The Statutes of Grand Duchy Lithuania were a sign of the progressive European legal tradition, and were cited as precedent in Polish and Livonian courts. Furthermore, they had a major influence on the 1649 encoding of the Russian legal code, Sobornoye Ulozheniye. After forming an association with Poland—including both the dynastic union (1385–1569) and the confederated Polish–Lithuanian Commonwealth (1569–1795)—the Lithuanian Statutes were the Grand Duchy's greatest expression of independence.

In 1791, efforts were made to change the system and do away with the privileges of the nobility, creating a constitutional monarchy with a modern citizenry (see Constitution of 3 May). However, these plans came to naught when Russia, abetted by Austria and Prussia, partitioned the Commonwealth. On 30 October 1794, Russian empress Catherine the Great reversed all changes of the law approved by the Great Sejm, and mandated use of the Lithuanian Statutes as the applicable law for the conquered Western Krai of Russia. To facilitate the application of the decree translation of the document into Russian was started and took up to 1798. However, the print of this version of the document was swiftly forbidden as the 200-year-old document was seen as more liberal than the contemporary Imperial law. The statutes remained in effect until 1840, when they were outlawed by emperor Nicholas I as part of a reprisals and russification policies after the November Uprising.

== See also ==
- Law of Lithuania
- Kievan Rus' law

== Bibliography ==
- Frost, Robert (2015). The Oxford History of Poland–Lithuania. Vol. I: The Making of the Polish–Lithuanian Union, 1385–1569. Oxford University Press. ISBN 978-0-19-820869-3.
- Loewe, Karl von The Lithuanian Statute of 1529 Leiden 1976 ISBN 90 04 04520 1
- Savicki, Stanislaū (1967). "An Historical Conspectus of the Sources of Byelorussian Law". The Journal of Byelorussian Studies. I (3): 221–231.
