= Sejm of the Kingdom of Poland =

Parliamentary body of the Kingdom of Poland

Sejm of the Kingdom of Poland Sejm Królestwa Polskiego
- Kingdom of Poland

Type
- Type: Bicameral (since 1493)
- Chambers: Senate; Chamber of Deputies

History
- Established: 1386 (1493)
- Disbanded: 1569
- Preceded by: Curia Regis (wiec)
- Succeeded by: Sejm of the Polish–Lithuanian Commonwealth

Leadership
- King of Poland: Sigismund II Augustus since 1548
- Marshal of the Sejm: Stanisław Sędziwój Czarnkowski since 1569

Meeting place
- Royal Castle, Warsaw

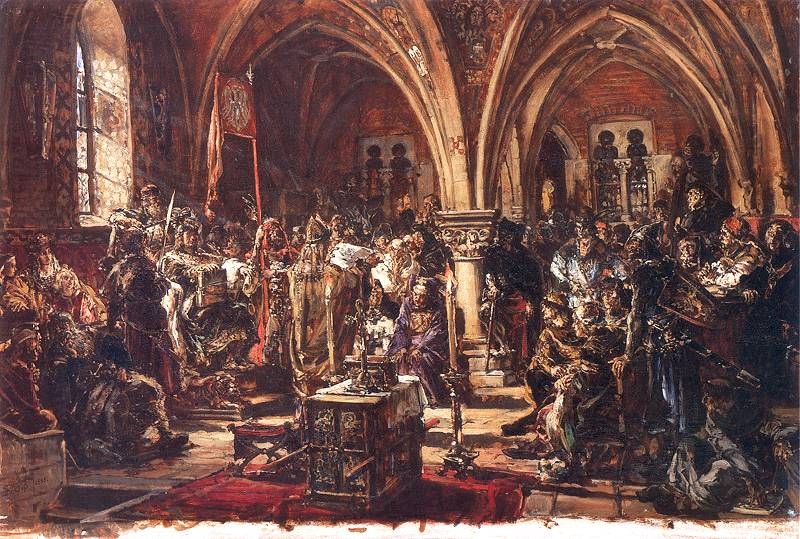
The First Sejm (held at Łęczyca). Painting by Jan Matejko.

The General Sejm (Polish: Sejm walny, also translated as the General Parliament) was the parliament of the Kingdom of Poland. It had evolved from the earlier institution of Curia Regis (King's Council) and was one of the primary elements of democratic governance in the Polish dominion.

Initially established in 1386, it officially functioned as a bicameral diet since the formation of the Senate in 1493. The Sejm was composed of members of the royal council or king's court (the royal court, who played the largest role), provincial crown offices such as castellans, voivodes and higher nobility or magnates (the aristocratic element represented by the senate, upper house), members of the nobility who did not hold any crown offices and city council representatives (the democratic element represented by the lower house or chamber of deputies). These were the so-called three parliamentary states: the king, the senate and the parliamentary chamber. The Sejm was a powerful political institution, and from early 16th century, the Polish king could not pass laws without the approval of that body. The Sejm of Poland and the Seimas of the Grand Duchy of Lithuania were merged into the Sejm of the Polish–Lithuanian Commonwealth by the Union of Lublin in 1569.

Duration and frequencies of the sejms changed over time, with the six-week sejm session convened every two years being most common. Sejm locations changed throughout history. The number of sejm deputies and senators grew over time. Sejms have seen mostly majority voting.

== History ==
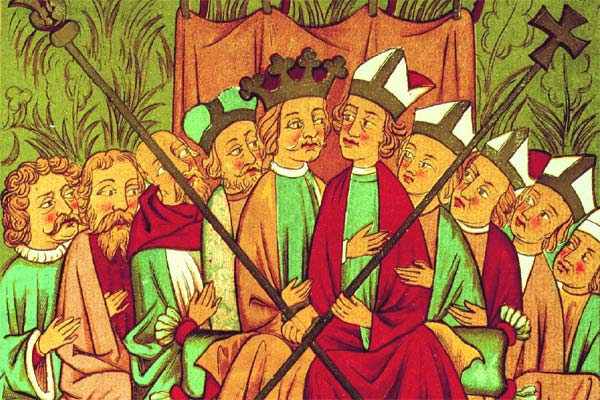
A wiec in the reign of King Casimir the Great (14th-century Poland)

The General Sejm of the Kingdom of Poland appeared for the first time in the years 1382–1386, when nobility and city representatives began to come to the nationwide official congresses. Public participation in policy making in Poland can be traced to the Slavic assembly known as the wiec. Another form of public decision making was that of royal election, which occurred when there was no clear heir to the throne, or the heir's appointment had to be confirmed. On February 2, 1386, at one of the first general parliamentary sessions in Lublin, Jogaila was elected the king of Poland. There are legends of a 9th-century election of the legendary founder of the Piast dynasty, Piast the Wheelwright, and a similar election of his son, Siemowit (this would place a Polish ruler's election a century before an Icelandic one's by the Althing), but sources for that time come from the later centuries and their validity is disputed by scholars. The election privilege was usually limited to the most powerful nobles (magnates) or officials, and was heavily influenced by local traditions and strength of the ruler. By the 12th or 13th century, the wiec institution likewise limited its participation to high ranking nobles and officials. The nationwide gatherings of wiec officials in 1306 and 1310 can be seen as precursors of the general sejm.

The traditions of local wiec's or sejmiks survived the period of Poland's fragmentation (1146–1295), and continued in the restored Kingdom of Poland. Sejmiks proper date to the late 14th century when they arose from gatherings of nobility, formed for military and consultative purposes. Sejmiks were legally recognized by the 1454 Nieszawa Statutes, in a privilege granted to the szlachta (Polish nobility) by King Casimir IV Jagiellon, when the King agreed to consult certain decisions with the nobility. Such local gatherings were preferred by the kings, as national assemblies would try to claim more power than the regional ones. Nonetheless, with time the power of such assemblies grew, entrenched with milestone privileges obtained by the szlachta particularly during periods of transition from one dynasty or royal succession system to another (such as the Privilege of Koszyce of 1374).

According to some older historians, such as Zygmunt Gloger or Tadeusz Czacki, the first sejm took place in 1180, the date of the gathering of notables (zjazd, translated as an assembly, congress or synod) at Łęczyca, shown on a painting of Jan Matejko entitled "The First Sejm". More modern works however do not refer to the Łęczyca gathering as a sejm and instead focus on the more regular national gatherings that became known as sejm walny or sejm wielki and date to the 15th century. Whereas Bardach in discussing the beginning of sejm walny points to the national assemblies of the early 15th century, Jędruch prefers, as "a convenient time marker", the sejm of 1493, the first recorded bicameral session of the Polish parliament (although as noted by Sedlar, 1493 is simply the first time such a session was clearly recorded in sources, and the first bicameral session might have taken place earlier).

== Composition ==
Until 1468, sejms gathered only the high ranking nobility and officials, but the sejm of 1468 saw deputies elected from various local territories. Although all nobles were allowed to participate in the general sejm, with the growing importance of local sejmiks in the 15th century, it became more common for the sejmiks to elect deputies for the general sejm. In time, this shifted importance, particularly legislative competence, from local sejmiks to the general sejm.

The two chambers were:

- A senate (senat) of high ecclesiastical and secular officials, forming the royal council. In the mid-15th century they numbered 73. That number grew with time, with 81 senators around 1493–1504, and 95 around 1553–1565.
- A lower house, the sejm proper, of lower ranking officials and general nobility. That number also grew with time, at first below that of the senators, with 53 deputies around 1493–1504, and 92 around 1553–65.

The lower house included the representatives of the major cities: Kraków, Lublin, Lwów, Poznań, Wilno, Gdańsk and Toruń. Other towns were also asked to send deputies at times. They had the same voting and debating rights as others however in practice their participation was limited and often they employed nobles to represent their interests.

== Location ==
Until the Union of Lublin (1569), sejms were held in Piotrków Trybunalski Castle, located in Piotrków, a town chosen for its proximity to the two major provinces of Poland, Greater Poland and Lesser Poland. From 1493, other locations would also host the sejms, most prominently Kraków, where 29 sessions were held. Other locations included Brest (1653), Bydgoszcz (1520), Jędrzejów (1576), Kamionek (1573), Koło (1577), Korczyn (1511), Lublin (1506, 1554, 1566, 1569), Poznań (1513), Sandomierz (1500, 1519), Toruń (1519, 1577), and Warsaw (1556, 1563, and numerous times after 1568).

== Duration and frequency ==
In the mid-15th century the general sejm met about once per year. There was no set time span to elapse before the next session was to be called by the king. If the general sejm did not happen, local sejmiks would debate on current issues instead.
