= Knight class (Polish–Lithuanian Commonwealth) =

The knight class (Note: Polish: Stan rycerski; Latin: Ordo Equestris) was a class of nobility in Polish–Lithuanian Commonwealth, a state that existed from 16th to 18th centuries. It included the nobility that did not held the senatorial offices. It was represented in the General Sejm by the Chamber of Deputies.
