= Guardians of the Laws =

Executive governing body of the Polish–Lithuanian Commonwealth

Guardians of the Laws or Guard of Laws (Polish: Straż Praw) was a short-lived supreme executive governing body of the Polish–Lithuanian Commonwealth established by the Constitution of May 3, 1791. It was abolished, together with other reforms of the Constitution, after the Polish defeat in the summer of Polish–Russian War of 1792.

Executive power in the reformed Commonwealth government, according to Article V and Article VII, rested in the hands of "the king in his council", the council being a cabinet of ministers known as the Guardians of the Laws.

The ministries could not create or interpret the laws, and all acts of the foreign ministry were provisional, subject to parliament (Sejm)'s approval. This council was presided over by the king and comprised the Roman Catholic Primate of Poland (who was also president of the Education Commission) and five ministers appointed by the king: a minister of police, minister of the seal (i.e. of internal affairs – the seal was a traditional attribute of the earlier Chancellor), minister of the seal of foreign affairs, minister belli (of war), and minister of treasury. In addition to the ministers, council members included – without a vote – the Crown Prince, the Marshal of the Sejm, and two secretaries. This royal council was a descendant of similar councils that had functioned over the previous two centuries since King Henry's Articles (1573) and the recent Permanent Council. Acts of the king required the countersignature of the respective minister. The ministers, however, were responsible to Sejm, which could dismiss them by a two-thirds vote of no confidence by the members of both houses. The stipulation that the king, "doing nothing of himself, ... shall be answerable for nothing to the nation", parallels the British constitutional principle that "The King can do no wrong." (In both countries, the respective minister was responsible for the king's acts.) Ministers could be also held accountable by the Sejm court, and Sejm could demand an impeachement trial of a minister with a simple majority vote.

The decisions of the royal council were carried out by commissions, including the previously created Commission of National Education, and the new Commissions for Police, the Military and the Treasury, whose members were elected by Sejm.
