= Crown Tribunal =

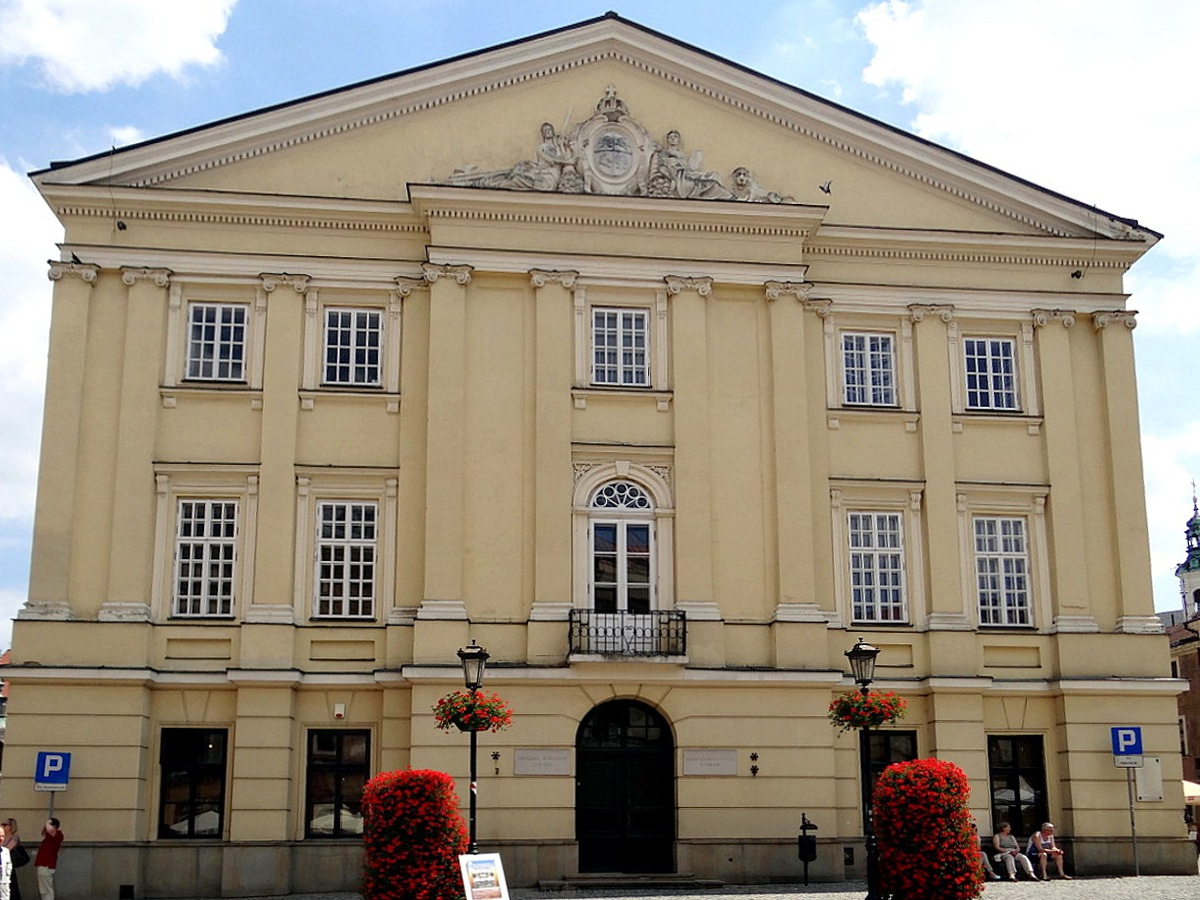
Building of the Crown Tribunal for the Lesser Poland Province in Lublin (2014)

The Crown Tribunal (Polish: Trybunał Główny Koronny, Latin: Iudicium Ordinarium Generale Tribunalis Regni) was the highest appellate court in the Crown of the Kingdom of Poland for most cases. Exceptions were if a noble landowner was threatened with loss of life and/or property, when he could appeal to the Sejm court (Parliament court).

In 1578, King Stefan Batory created the Crown Tribunal to reduce the enormous pressure on the royal court. That placed much of the monarch's juridical power in the hands of the elected deputies of the szlachta (nobility) and further strengthened that class. In 1581, the Crown Tribunal was joined by a counterpart in Lithuania, the Lithuanian Tribunal (Trybunał Litewski).

The tribunal consisted of 27 secular deputies elected from the nobility (szlachta) annually during the sessions of the local parliaments (sejmiks) and 6 ecclesiastical deputies elected by their respective Chapters. The tribunal was headed by a Tribunal President (prezydent for the Crown Tribunal, prezes for the Lithuanian Tribunal) and a Marshal (marszałek trybunału). The Marshal was chosen from and by the judges themselves, and the President dealt with ecclesiastic matters and was a high-ranking priest.

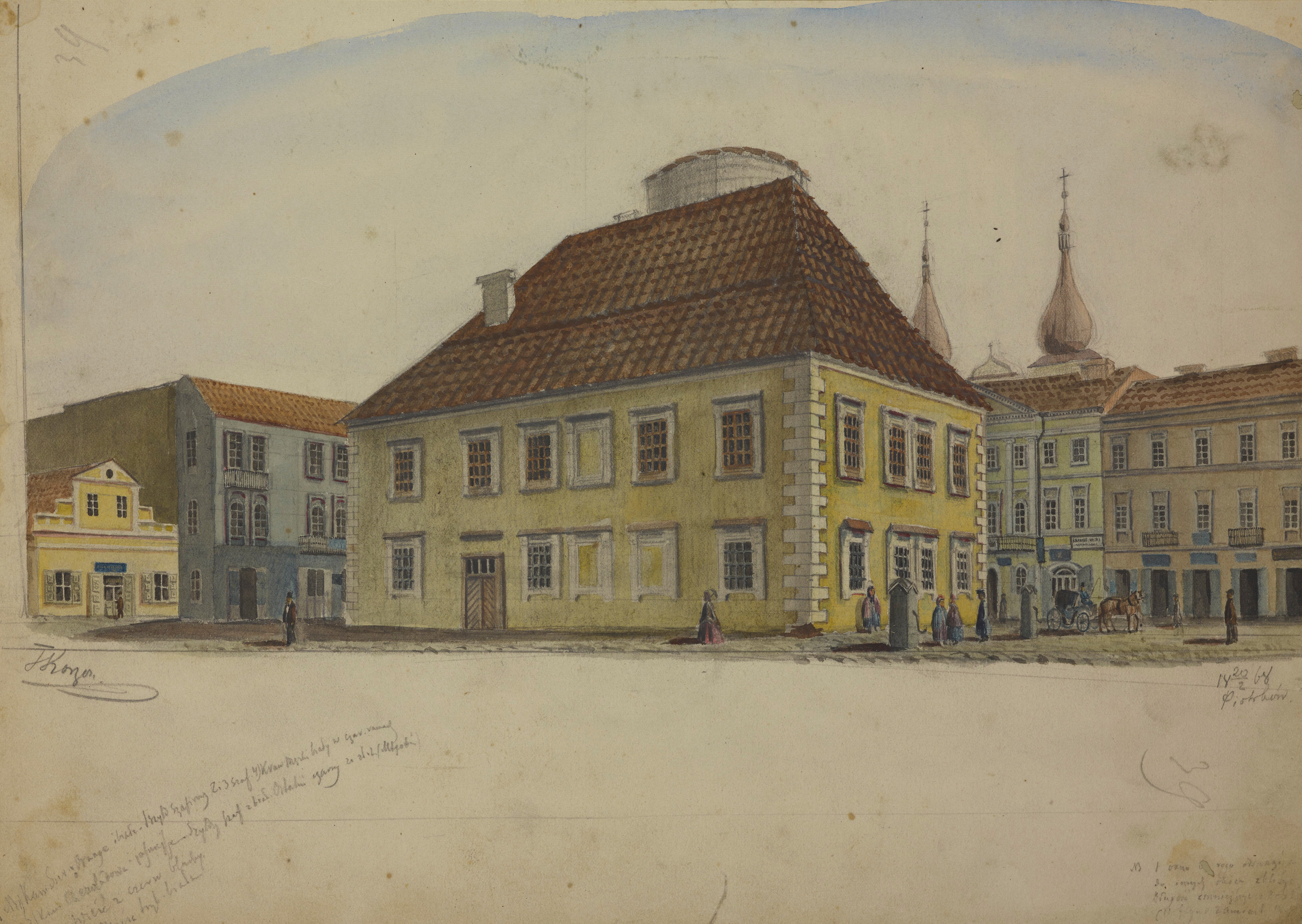
Former Crown Tribunal for the Greater Poland Province in Piotrków

Two main locations of the Crown Tribunal were Piotrków Trybunalski (for the Greater Poland Province, held in autumn and winter) and Lublin (for the Lesser Poland Province, in spring and summer). Until 1590, some sessions were held in Łuck, and from 1764, some were in Poznań.

A session of the tribunal would last six months.

Decisions were supposed to be taken by consensus in the first or second voting, but if there was no consensus, the third could was to be decided by a simple majority.

The tribunals had many problems since their creation, as the judges rarely had any formal training and were basically politicians elected each year. With the progressive degradation of Polish political system in the early 18th century, the tribunals became as corrupt and dependent on the magnates from the Sejm. Several minor reforms had little effect until the tribunals were finally subject to a major reform by the Great Sejm of 1788-1792. However, those reforms, along with the Tribunals themselves, were soon annulled in the aftermath of the Partitions of Poland.

Crown Treasury courts were created in 1613 (Trybunał Skarbowy Koronny, Trybunał Skarbowy Litewski).

The wages for all judges were decided at Sejm meetings.

== See also ==
- Exile#History section discusses the 'banicja' (exile) and 'infamia' penalties of the Commonwealth
