= Lviv High Castle =

Ruined castle in Lviv, Ukraine

Coordinates: 49°50′53.92″N 24°2′21.88″E

- Високий замок
- Lviv
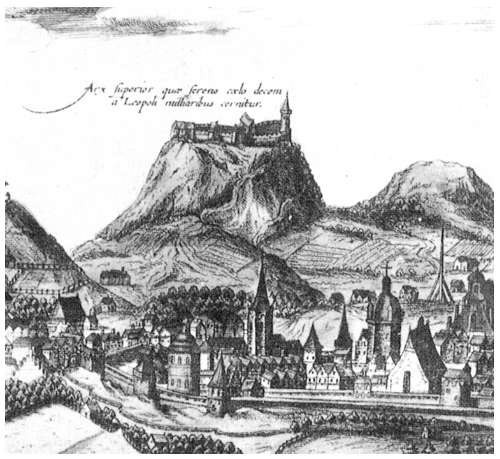
- A fragment of Lviv engraving by A. Hogenberg, 17th century

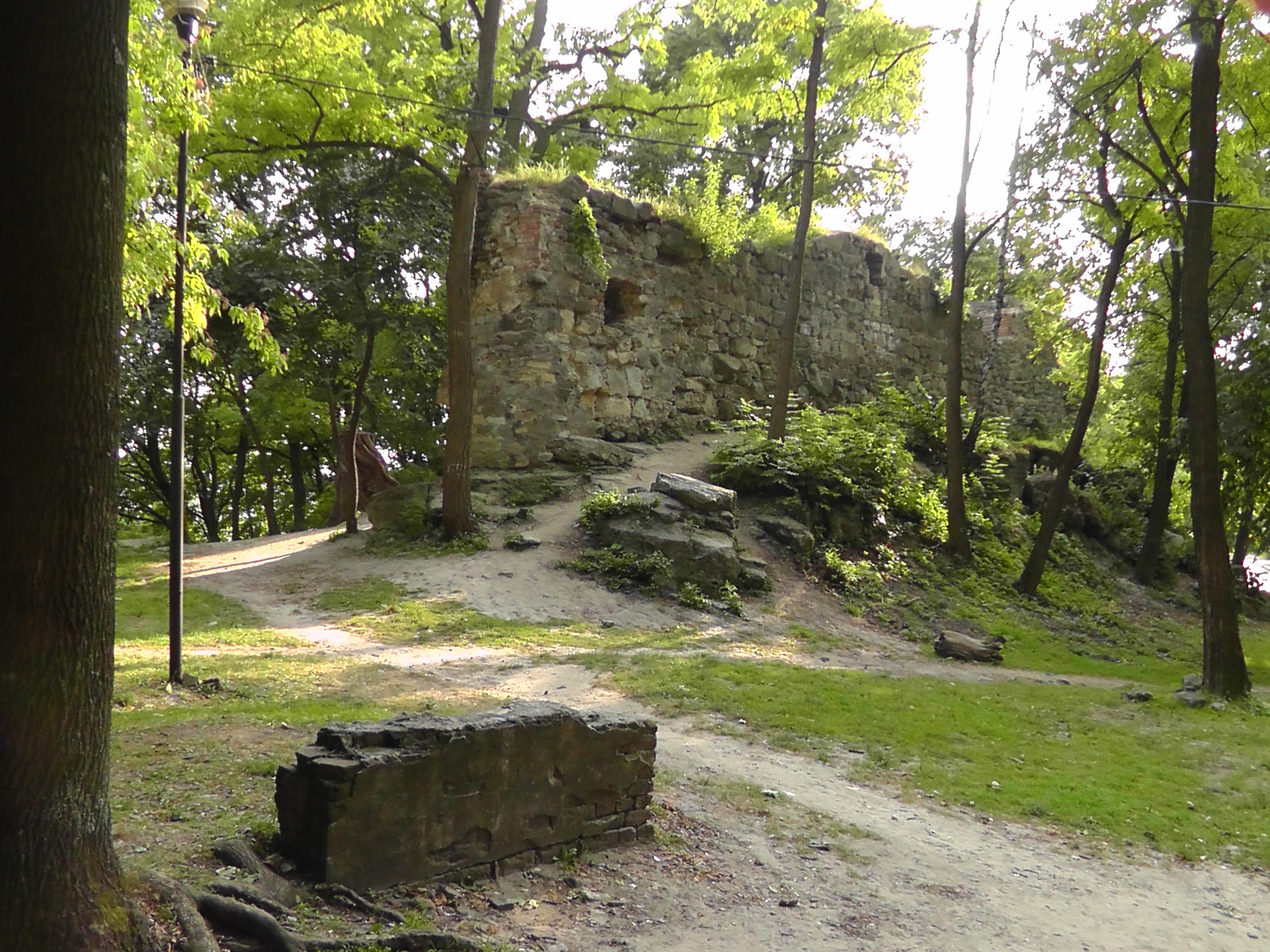
- Part of the South Wall of the High Castle.

Site information
- Condition: Ruins

Site history
- Built: 1362
- Built by: Casimir III of Poland
- Materials: Wood and stone
- Demolished: 1869

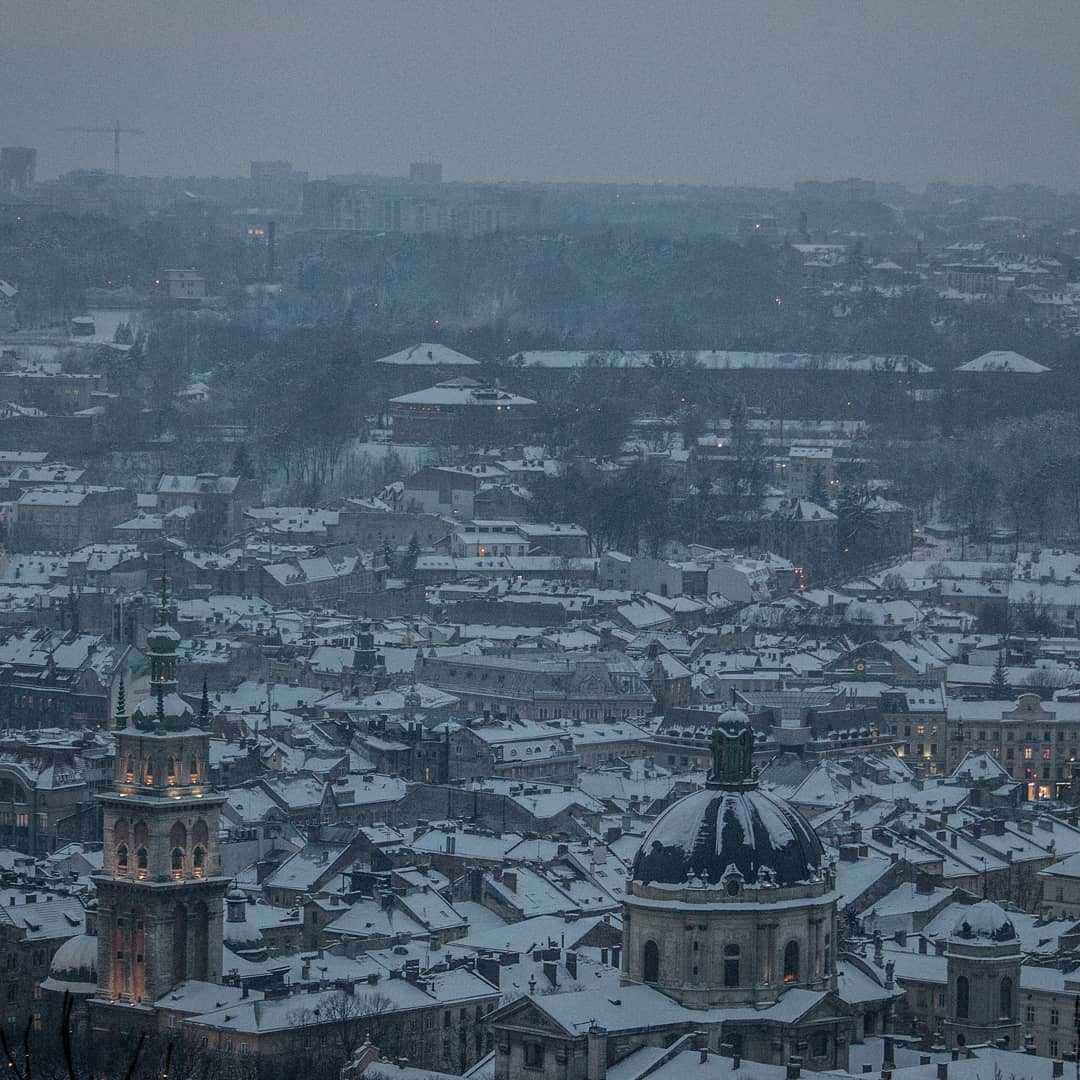
Overlooking Lviv from the High Castle during Wintertime.

The Lviv High Castle (Ukrainian: Високий замок, romanized: Vysokyi zamok, pronounced [wɪˈsɔkɪj ˈzɑmok]; Polish: Wysoki Zamek) is a historic castle located on the top of the Castle Hill of the city of Lviv, Ukraine. It is the highest point in the city, 413 metres (1,355 ft) above sea level. The castle currently stands in ruins.

The High Castle is proximate to the centre of Lviv (see picture), formerly being surrounded by a fortification wall. The Castle Hill took its name from the High Castle (as opposed to the Lviv Low Castle, once located on the east bank of the Poltva), which used to be located on the hill from the 13th century to the late 19th century. The castle was a main defensive fort of the city during its existence.

== History ==
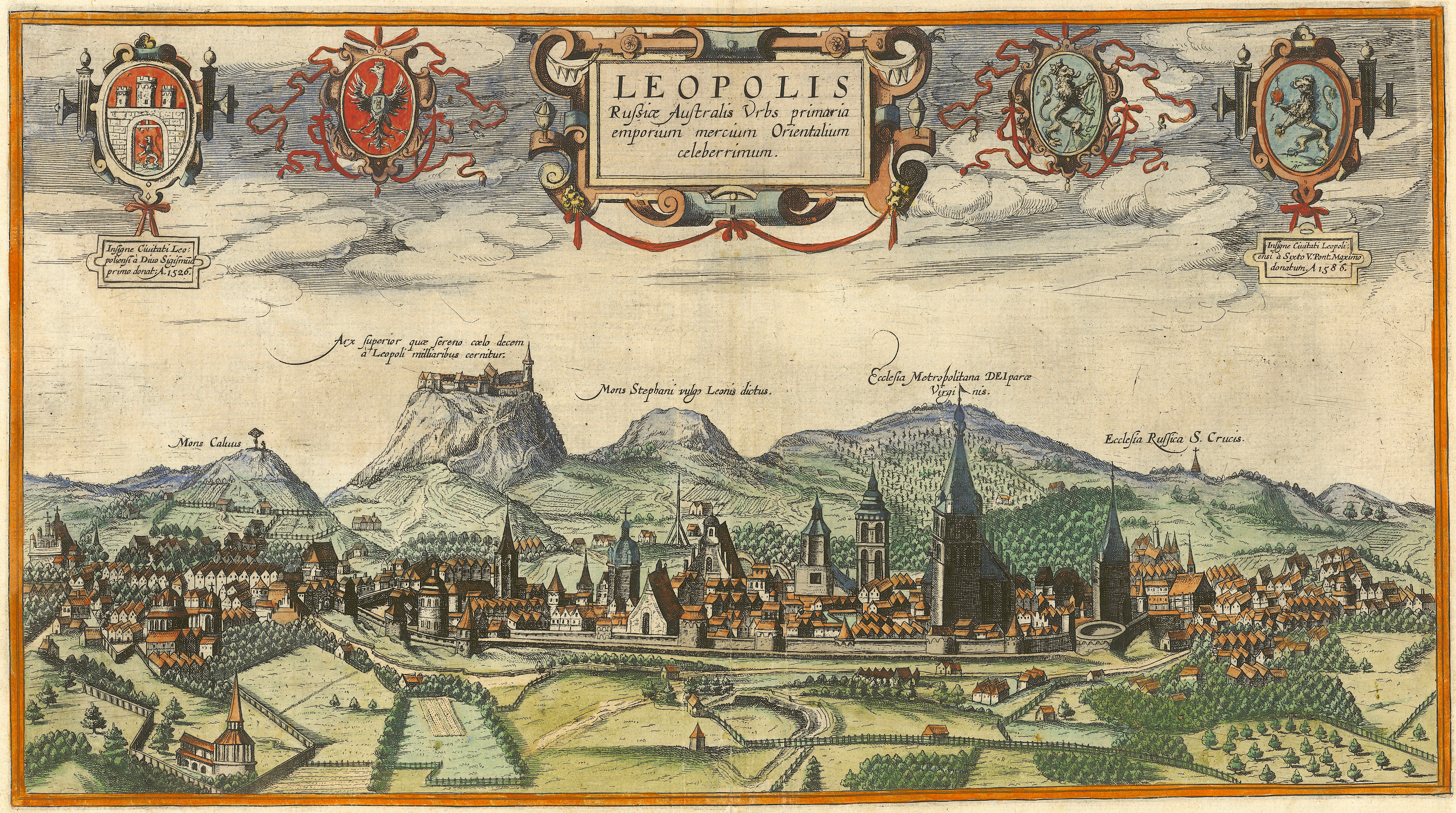
Hogenberg's engraving "Leopolis Russice australis urbs primaria emporium mercium orientalium celeberrimum"

Before the castle was built, there were certainly defensive structures in Lviv, but their shape and exact location are unknown. As it follows from Rus' chronicles, the first wooden structures were built by Leo I of Halych. In 1261 by a request of Mongol military leader Boroldai they were destroyed. Before 1283 they were rebuilt. Here was the treasury of the Kingdom of Rus', including crowns, thrones and precious crosses with parts of the True Cross.

According to chronicler Jan Długosz in 1340, when Lviv was captured by Casimir III of Poland, the king ordered city's fortifications to be dismantled. In 1351 Lithuanian prince Liubartas captured and burned down Lviv. Two years later in 1353 Liubartas again invaded the city this time destroying it completely. Casimir III built a new town on the Poltva River and granted it Magdeburg rights in 1356.

A new stone and brick castle was built around 1362 under the rule of king Casimir III. Due to its location on one of the hills above Lviv, it received the name of "High Castle", as opposed to the "Lower Castle" built in the city proper to host royal starosts, who governed the whole land of Rus'. Between 1379 and 1387 a Hungarian garrison was stationed in the castle until the city returned under Polish rule.

In the 15th century the castle was recognized as the most powerful fortification in Ruthenian lands. Under Polish rule the castle was managed by starosts appointed by the monarch. Direct oversight of the fortifications was performed by burgraves who served as starosts' deputies. The castle's cellars and towers were also used to hold prisoners, including Teutonic knights captured at the Battle of Grunwald. The castle's strategic importance rose following the increase in frequency of Tatar raids in the mid-15h century, and its fortifications underwent repair works under the rule of Casimir IV Jagiellon. In 1498 and 1509 it withstood sieges by Moldavians and their Ottoman allies. The castle's main tower was damaged by a major fire which engulfed Lviv in 1527. In 1537, the castle witnessed a rebellion known as the Chicken War against Polish king Sigismund I the Old and his wife Bona Sforza.

The castle was rebuilt and repaired many times. In the times of Khmelnytsky Uprising it was taken by Cossack forces of Colonel Maksym Kryvonis in October 1648. In 1704, when Lviv was occupied by Swedes the castle was heavily damaged. In 1777, Austrians initiated disassembling of fortifications around the castle.

In the 19th century, the then destroyed castle was taken apart and new facilities were built in its place. The fortification was strengthened, trees were planted on the hill's slope, and a park was constructed. On the place where the castle once stood, the Union of Lublin Mound was constructed in 1869, dedicated to the 300-years of the Union of Lublin. Currently, an observation platform is located atop the kurgan. In 1957, a 141-meter tall television tower was constructed on a ridge of the hill (see picture).

In 2004-2005, there were talks of reconstructing a stone castle on the hill. The project gained some support and opposition. However, at this time, plans for the construction of the castle are not realistic.

== In culture ==
Highcastle: A Remembrance (Polish: Wysoki Zamek), a 1966 coming-of-age autobiographical novel by Lviv-born Polish science fiction writer Stanisław Lem, refers to the castle.

The castle is mentioned in a popular World War II-era Ukrainian folk song, which describes a mother lamenting her partisan son who fell in battle nearby.
