= Piotrków Trybunalski Castle =

Coordinates: 50°47′50″N 20°27′37″E

Piotrków Trybunalski Royal Castle
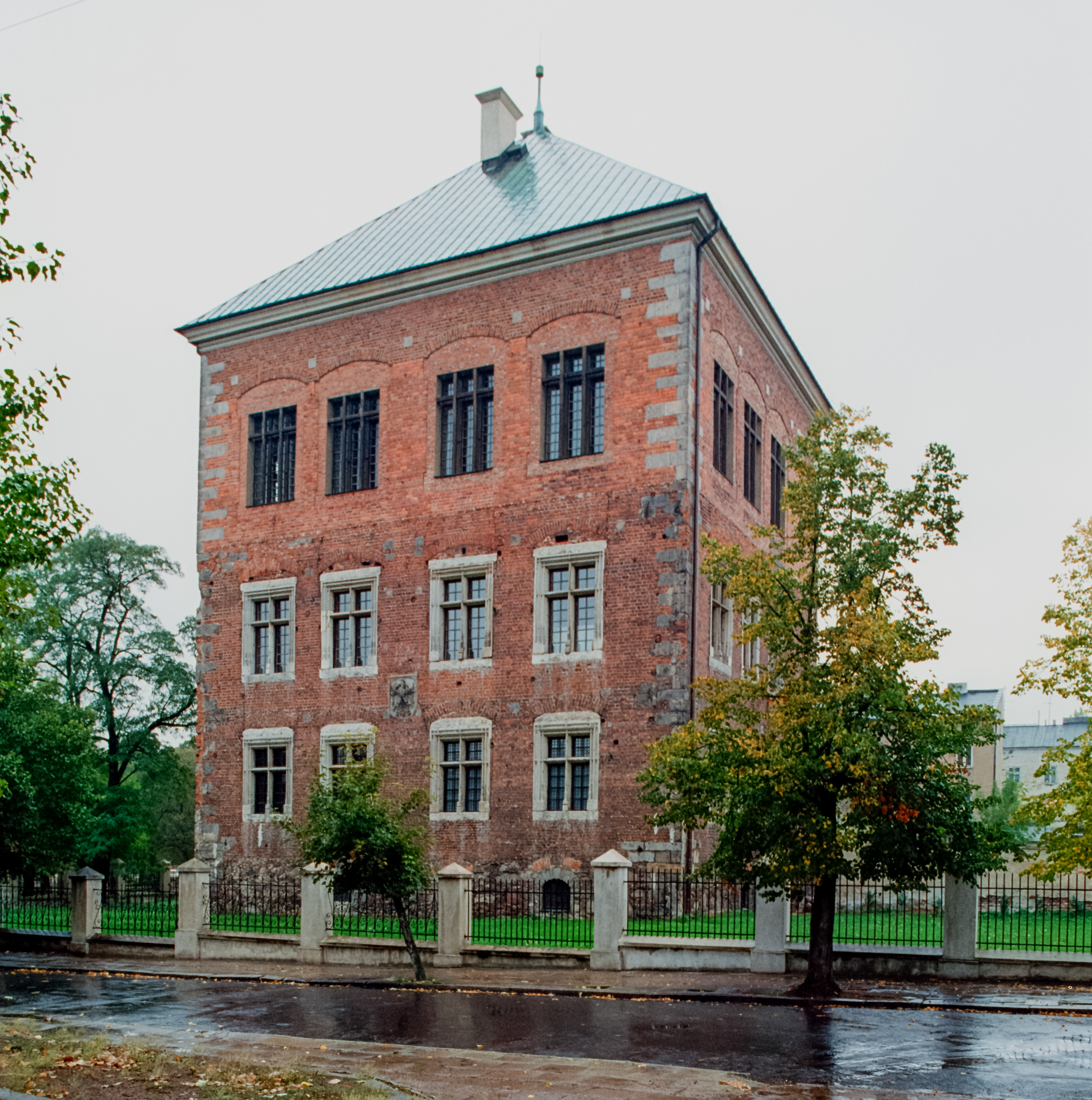
- Interactive map of the Piotrków Trybunalski Royal Castle area

General information
- Architectural style: Polish Gothic–Renaissance
- Location: Piotrków Trybunalski, Poland
- Construction started: 1511
- Completed: 1519
- Demolished: 1657
- Client: Sigismund I the Old

Design and construction
- Architect: Benedykt Sandomierski

The Piotrków Trybunalski Royal Castle is a Gothic-Renaissance structure in Piotrków Trybunalski, Poland. It was built in the form of a residential tower in the 16th century and was transformed into a museum open to the public in 1919.

== History ==
The stronghold on the left bank of the Strawa River existed in the 13th century. The conventions, which were held here in the 14th century gave the city greater importance in the Kingdom of Poland and according to contemporary chronicler Jan of Czarnków, Casimir III the Great ordered a residence to be built here, which was accomplished in 1347. The 1493 Sejm held at the Piotrków Castle was the first bicameral parliament in Poland. It consist of the royal council, called the senate, and the chamber of deputies.

In the following years, the building became inadequate for the purposes of the royal court. Therefore, the court architect of King Sigismund I the Old, Benedykt Sandomierski erected a new residence, which was completed in 1519. The new residence was built in the Renaissance style in the shape of a residential tower on a square measuring 18 × 20 m (19.68 × 21.87 yd). The structure was crowned with a profusely decorated attic. In the 16th century, the castle was the site of frequent regional councils and synods. During the Deluge it was burned by Swedish-Brandenburgian troops. The reconstruction took place between 1668–1671 supervised by Michał Warszycki, sword-bearer of the Crown. The fortifications were not restored as well as the demolished attic, and the whole structure was crowned with a pavilion roof.

With the Second Partition of Poland the castle again fell into disrepair. in 1869 the Russian Governor of Piotrków undertook a restoration to convert the former royal residence into a garrison Orthodox church. The building suffered again during World War II. After the war the Regional Conservator recommended rebuilding the castle by the state before Warszycki's reconstruction, restoring its Renaissance features. Eventually, the structure was rebuilt between 1963–1969, without restoring the Renaissance attic.

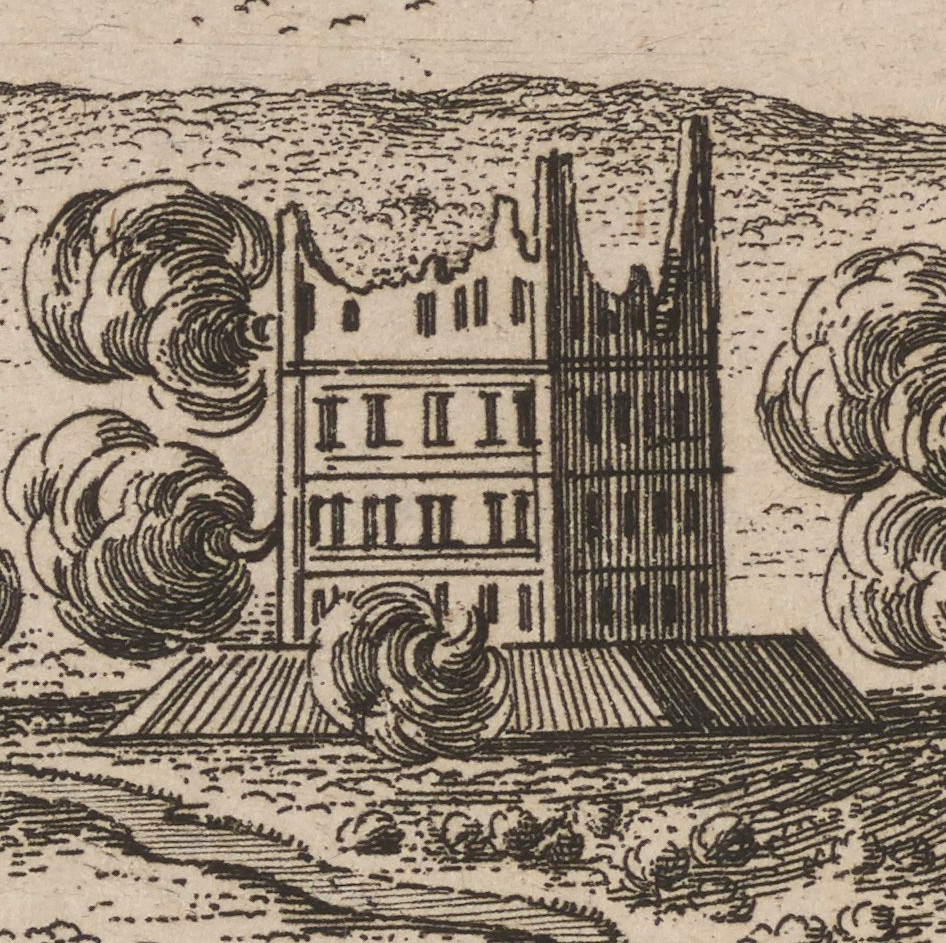
The destruction of the castle during the Deluge in 1657

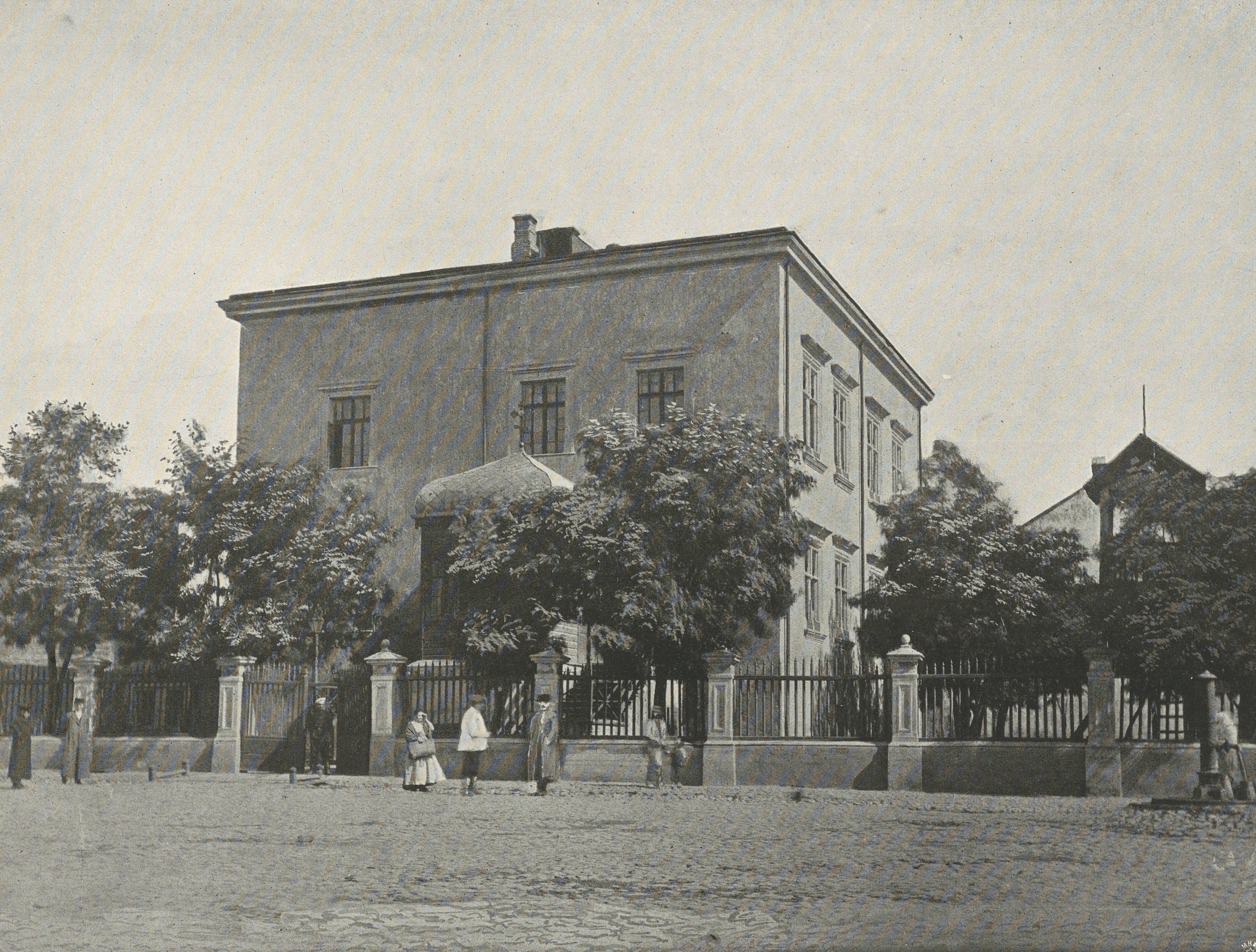
Castle without a third floor before 1899
