= Sejm of the Grand Duchy of Lithuania =

The sejm (Lithuanian: Seimas, Ruthenian: Соймъ, Polish: Sejm) was an early parliament in the Grand Duchy of Lithuania. It was active from 1445 to 1569, when it was officially abolished by the Union of Lublin. The Sejm was an irregular gathering of the Lithuanian nobility, called as needed by the Grand Duke or during an interregnum by the Lithuanian Council of Lords (an early government). The meetings would usually last one or two weeks. Sejm gradually evolved from a meeting of the most powerful magnates to a full legislative institution representing all of the nobility. The Sejm was not the main political player as it was overshadowed by the Council of Lords. The Union of Lublin created a new state, the Polish–Lithuanian Commonwealth, and joined the Sejm of Lithuania with Sejm of Poland into one Sejm of the Polish–Lithuanian Commonwealth. However, the Sejm continued to convene under the name of Lithuanian Convocation. In total there were 40 Sejm and 37 Convocations.

== History ==
Number of Sejm Meetings
Reign	Location	Times
Casimir IV Jagiellon (1440–1492)	Vilnius	7
Casimir IV Jagiellon (1440–1492)	Brest	4
Casimir IV Jagiellon (1440–1492)	Hrodna	2
Casimir IV Jagiellon (1440–1492)	Navahradak	1
Alexander Jagiellon (1492–1506)	Vilnius	3
Sigismund I the Old (1506–1548)	Vilnius	13
Sigismund I the Old (1506–1548)	Brest	4
Sigismund I the Old (1506–1548)	Hrodna	1
Sigismund I the Old (1506–1548)	Navahradak	1
Sigismund II Augustus I (1548–1564)	Vilnius	3
Sigismund II Augustus I (1548–1564)	Minsk	1
Total		40

The first traces of large nobility meetings can be found in the Treaty of Salynas of 1398 and the Union of Horodło of 1413. It is considered that the first Sejm met in Hrodna in 1445 during talks between Casimir IV Jagiellon and the Council of Lords. Soon influence of the nobility grew as Casimir's privileges released veldamas, dependent peasants, from their taxes to the state. That meant a significant increase in nobility's revenue. As the Muscovite–Lithuanian Wars raged the country almost continuously between 1492 and 1582, the Grand Duke needed more tax revenues to finance the army and had to call the Sejm more frequently. In exchange for cooperation, the nobility demanded various privileges, including strengthening of the Sejm.

At first the Sejm did not have the legislative power. It would debate on foreign and domestic affairs, taxes, wars, state budget. At the beginning of the 16th century, the Sejm acquired some legislative powers. The Sejm could petition the Grand Duke to pass certain laws. The Duke usually granted the request as he needed nobility's support and cooperation. At first members of the Sejm were members of the Council of Lords and high state officials. Only gradually all interested nobles could attend the meetings. No invitation was necessary to attend. As the importance of Sejm grew, nobles from more distant regions started electing representatives from their districts and sending them to the meeting. However, the Sejm was dominated by the magnates as they were much more politically active and lesser nobles were more passive observers. However, gradually the lesser nobles understood that the Sejm gave them power to block new taxes and by mid-16th century they started to demand more privileges for themselves. Thus the Sejm shifted from magnate-controlled political tool to a representation of all nobles. This shift was influenced by a similar movement in Poland.

Major reforms were carried out between 1564 and 1566, just before the Union of Lublin. According to the Second Statute of Lithuania, the Sejm acquired full legislative powers. It was composed of two houses: the upper house, called Senate, was the equivalent to the former Council of Lords and the lower house was made up of representatives of each district of the state. No longer any member of the nobility could participate: each of the 28 powiats could send only two delegates. It started a tradition of local Sejm (called seimelis) to elect the representatives.

When the separate Sejm for Lithuania was officially abolished in 1569, it adopted the name of Lithuanian Convocations and continued to meet until the partitions of the Polish–Lithuanian Commonwealth in 1795. It debated matters concerning the Grand Duchy of Lithuania or tried to establish a common position among Lithuanian delegates before departing for the Sejm of the Commonwealth. The convocations retained basic structures (upper and lower houses) and procedures of the Sejm: each powiat could send only two representatives. Convocations were called by the Grand Duke, who also ratified its decisions and included them in official law books.

== See also ==
- Sejm of Central Lithuania
