= Union of Lublin Mound =

Artificial hill and monument in Lviv, Ukraine

Coordinates: 49°50′53.95″N 24°2′22.05″E

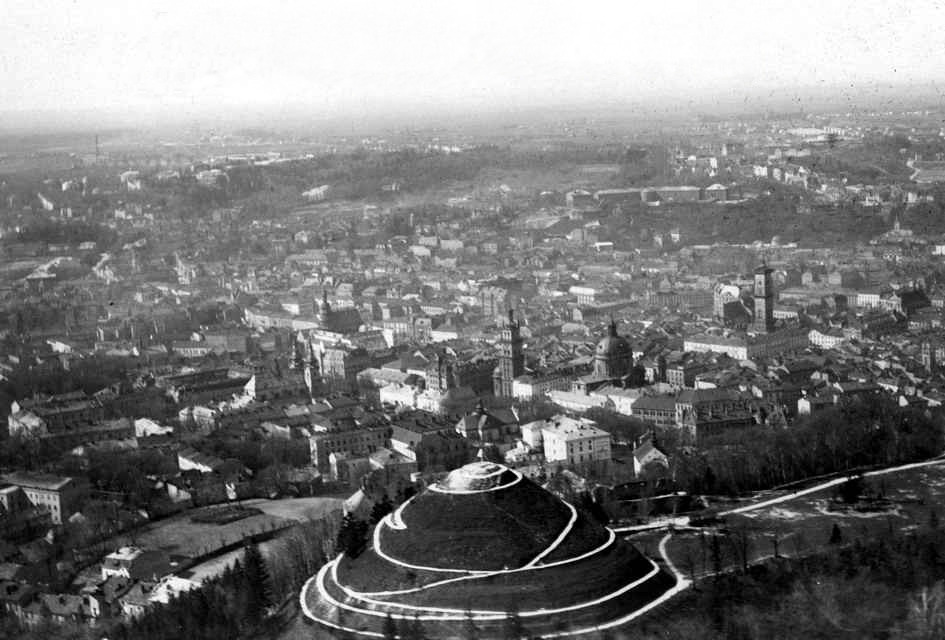
Aerial view of the mound, late 1930s

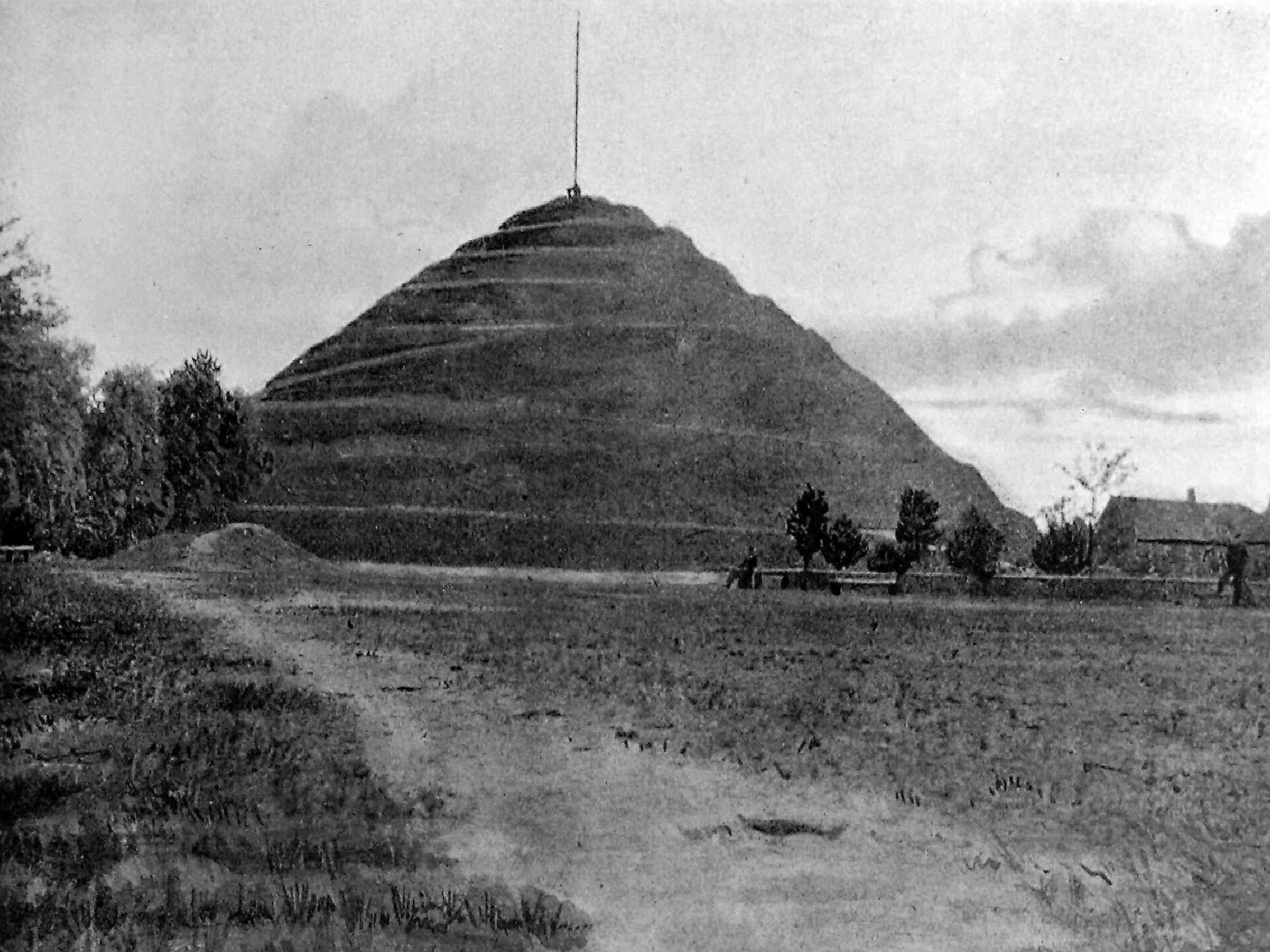
Status in late nineteenth and early twentieth century

Union of Lublin Mound (Ukrainian: Копець Люблінської унії, romanized: Kopets Liublinskoi unii; Polish: Kopiec Unii Lubelskiej) is an artificial hill, 29 m high, in Lviv, modern day Ukraine created in 1869-1890 by Polish inhabitants to commemorate the 300th anniversary of the Union of Lublin by initiative and with financial support of Franciszek Smolka. It is located on the summit of Lviv High Castle.

There is an observation platform at the top of the mound (altitude 413 m), offering a vantage viewpoint over Lviv.
