= Sejm of the Polish–Lithuanian Commonwealth =

Parliament of the Polish–Lithuanian Commonwealth

Sejm of the Polish–Lithuanian Commonwealth Sejm Rzeczypospolitej Obojga Narodów
- Polish–Lithuanian Commonwealth

Type
- Type: Bicameral
- Chambers: Senate; Chamber of Deputies

History
- Preceded by: Sejm of the Kingdom of Poland; Sejm of the Grand Duchy of Lithuania
- Succeeded by: Sejm of the Duchy of Warsaw

Elections
- Senate voting system: Appointment by King
- Chamber of Deputies voting system: Indirect election
- Last Chamber of Deputies election: 27 May 1793

Meeting place
- Royal Castle, Warsaw

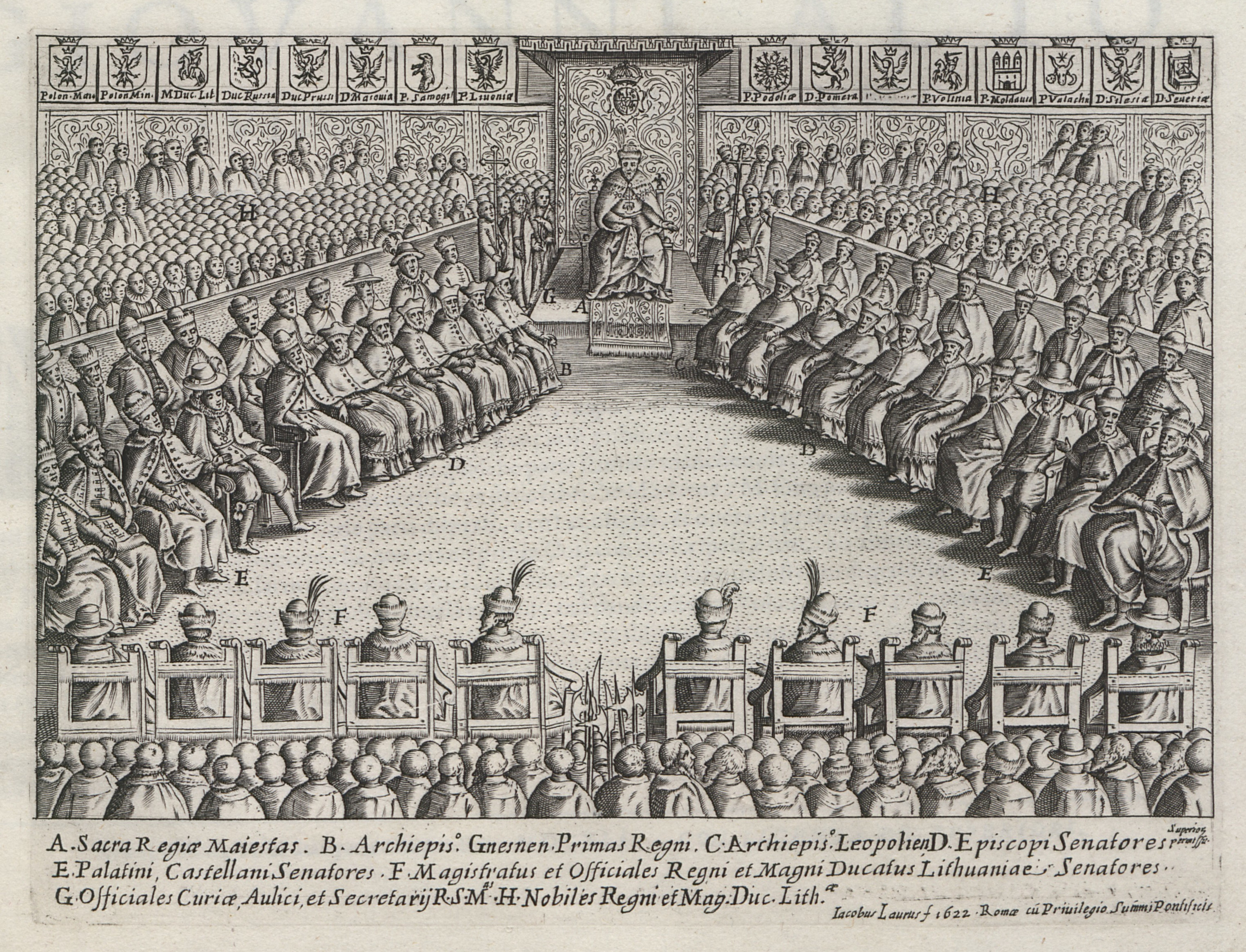
Sejm during the reign of Sigismund III Vasa (1587–1632)

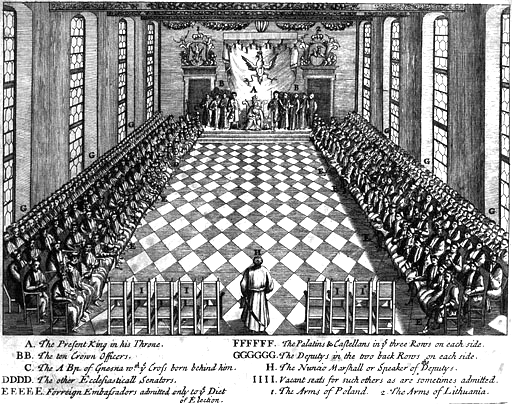
Sejm during the reign of Augustus II the Strong (1694–1733)

The General Sejm (Polish: sejm walny, Latin: comitia generalia) was the bicameral legislature of the Polish–Lithuanian Commonwealth. It was established by the Union of Lublin in 1569 following the merger of the legislatures of the two states, the Sejm of the Kingdom of Poland and the Sejm of the Grand Duchy of Lithuania. It was one of the primary elements of the democratic governance in the Commonwealth (see Golden Liberty). The sejm was a powerful political institution. The king could not pass laws without its approval.

The two chambers of a sejm were the Senate (senat) consisting of high ecclesiastical and secular officials, and the lower house, Chamber of Deputies (izba poselska), the sejm proper, of lower ranking officials and the representatives of all szlachta. Together with the king, the three were known as the sejming estates, or estates of the sejm (stany sejmujące, literally, "deliberating estates").

Duration and frequencies of the sejms changed over time, with the six-week sejm session convened every two years being most common. Sejm locations changed throughout history, eventually with the Commonwealth capital of Warsaw emerging as the primary location. The number of sejm deputies and senators grew over time, from about 70 senators and 50 deputies in the 15th century to about 150 senators and 200 deputies in the 18th century. Early sejms have seen mostly majority voting, but beginning in the 17th century, unanimous voting became more common, and 32 sejms were vetoed with the liberum veto provision, particularly in the first half of the 18th century. This vetoing device has been credited with significantly paralyzing the Commonwealth governance.

In addition to the regular sessions of the general sejm, in the era of electable kings, beginning in 1573, three special types of sejms (convocation, election, and coronation sejms) handled the process of the royal election in the interregnum period. In total, 173 sejms met between 1569 and 1793.

== Etymology ==
The Polish word sejm is derived from old Czech sejmovat, which means to bring together or to summon. In English, the terms general, full, or ordinary sejm are used for the sejm walny.

== Genesis ==
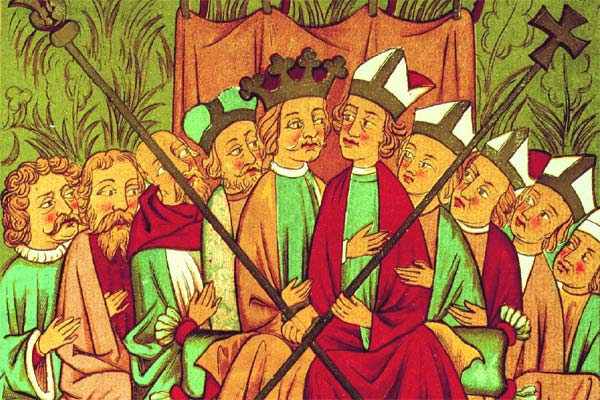
A wiec in the reign of King Casimir the Great (14th-century Poland)

The Sejm of the Polish–Lithuanian Commonwealth was established by the Union of Lublin in 1569 and merged the Sejm of the Kingdom of Poland and the Sejm of the Grand Duchy of Lithuania. Both countries had centuries-long tradition of public participation in policy making, traced to the Slavic assembly known as the wiec. The sejmik "little sejm" was a regional or local assembly, among whose later tasks were sending delegates and instructions to the "general sejm". Another form of public decision making in Poland was that of royal election, which occurred when there was no clear heir to the throne, or the heir's appointment had to be confirmed. With time the power of such assemblies grew, entrenched with milestone privileges obtained by the nobility (szlachta) particularly during periods of transition from one dynasty or royal succession system to another (such as the Privilege of Koszyce of 1374). Tracing the history of the Sejm of Poland, Bardach points to the national assemblies of the early 15th century, Jędruch prefers, as "a convenient time marker", the sejm of 1493, the first recorded bicameral session of the Polish parliament. Sedlar, however, noted that 1493 is simply the first time such a session was clearly recorded in sources, and the first bicameral session might have taken place earlier.

The first traces of large nobility meetings in the Grand Duchy of Lithuania can be found in the Treaty of Salynas of 1398 and the Union of Horodło of 1413. It is considered that the first Sejm of the Grand Duchy of Lithuania met in Hrodna in 1445 during talks between Casimir IV Jagiellon and the Lithuanian Council of Lords. As the Muscovite–Lithuanian Wars raged the country almost continuously between 1492 and 1582, the Grand Duke needed more tax revenues to finance the army and had to call the Sejm more frequently. In exchange for cooperation, the nobility demanded various privileges, including strengthening of the Sejm. At first the Sejm did not have the legislative power. It would debate on foreign and domestic affairs, taxes, wars, state budget. At the beginning of the 16th century, the Sejm acquired some legislative powers. The Sejm could petition the Grand Duke to pass certain laws.

== Political influence ==
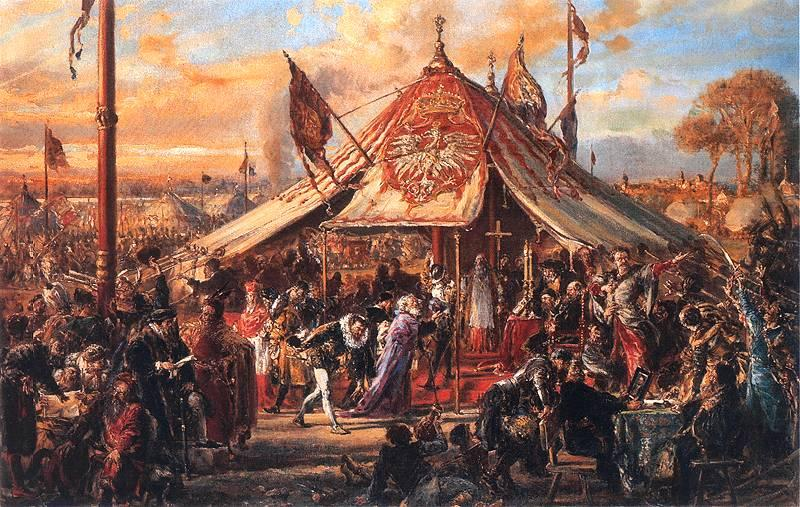
The first Polish royal election, of Henry III Valois, took place in 1573

Sejms, including their senate (the upper chamber), and sejmiks severely limited the king's powers.

Already the Sejm of the Kingdom of Poland has a great impact on the king's powers. From 1505 the king could not pass laws himself without the approval of the sejm, this being forbidden by Polish szlachta privilege laws like nihil novi. According to the nihil novi constitution, a law passed by the sejm had to be agreed by the three estates of the sejm. There were only few areas in which the king could pass legislation without consulting the sejm: on royal cities, peasants in royal lands, Jews, fiefs and on mining. The three estates of the sejm had the final decision in legislation on taxation, budget and treasury matters (including military funding), foreign policy (including hearing foreign envoys and sending diplomatic missions) and ennoblement. The sejm received fiscal reports from podskarbis (treasurers; they were ministers of the Commonwealth), and debated on most important court cases (the sejm court), with the right of amnesty. The sejm could also legislate in the absence of the king, although such legislation would have to be accepted by the king ex post.

Following the Constitution of 3 May 1791, the senate's competences were altered; in most cases, the senators could only vote together with the sejm, and the senate's veto powers were limited. Legislative power was limited to the deputies of the sejm (not senators voting separately, except on the senate's privilege of veto, a suspension of a given legislation until the sejm votes on it again during the next session). The king, who nominated senators, ministers and other officials, presided over the senate, and could propose new laws together with the executive government, over which he also presided (the newly created Straż Praw or the Guardianship of Laws). The sejm also had the supervisory role, as government ministers and other officials were to be responsible to it.

=== Voting ===
Until the end of the 16th century, unanimity was not required and majority voting predominated. Later, with the rise of the magnates' power, the unanimity principle was enforced with the szlachta privilege of liberum veto (from the Latin: "I freely forbid"). From the second half of the 17th century, the liberum veto was used to paralyze sejm proceedings and brought the Commonwealth to the brink of collapse. The growing power of sejmiks also contributed to the inefficiency of the sejm, as binding instructions from sejmiks could prevent some deputies from being able to support certain provisions. The pro-majority-voting party almost disappeared in the 17th century, and majority voting was preserved only at confederated sejms (sejm rokoszowy, konny, konfederacyjny). The liberum veto was finally abolished by the Constitution of 3 May 1791.

Reforms of 1764–66 improved the proceedings the sejm. They introduced majority voting for items declared as "non crucial" (most economic and tax matters) and outlawed binding instructions from sejmiks. Reforms of 1767 and 1773–75 transferred some competences of the sejm to the commissions of elected delegates. From 1768, hetmans were included among the senate members, and from 1775 also the Court Deputy Treasurer.

In the senate there was no voting; after all the senators who wished had spoken on a given matter, the king or the chancellor formed a general opinion based on the majority.

The Constitution of 3 May 1791 finally abolished the liberum veto, replacing it by majority voting, in most important matters requiring 75% of the votes.

=== Composition and electoral ordinance ===
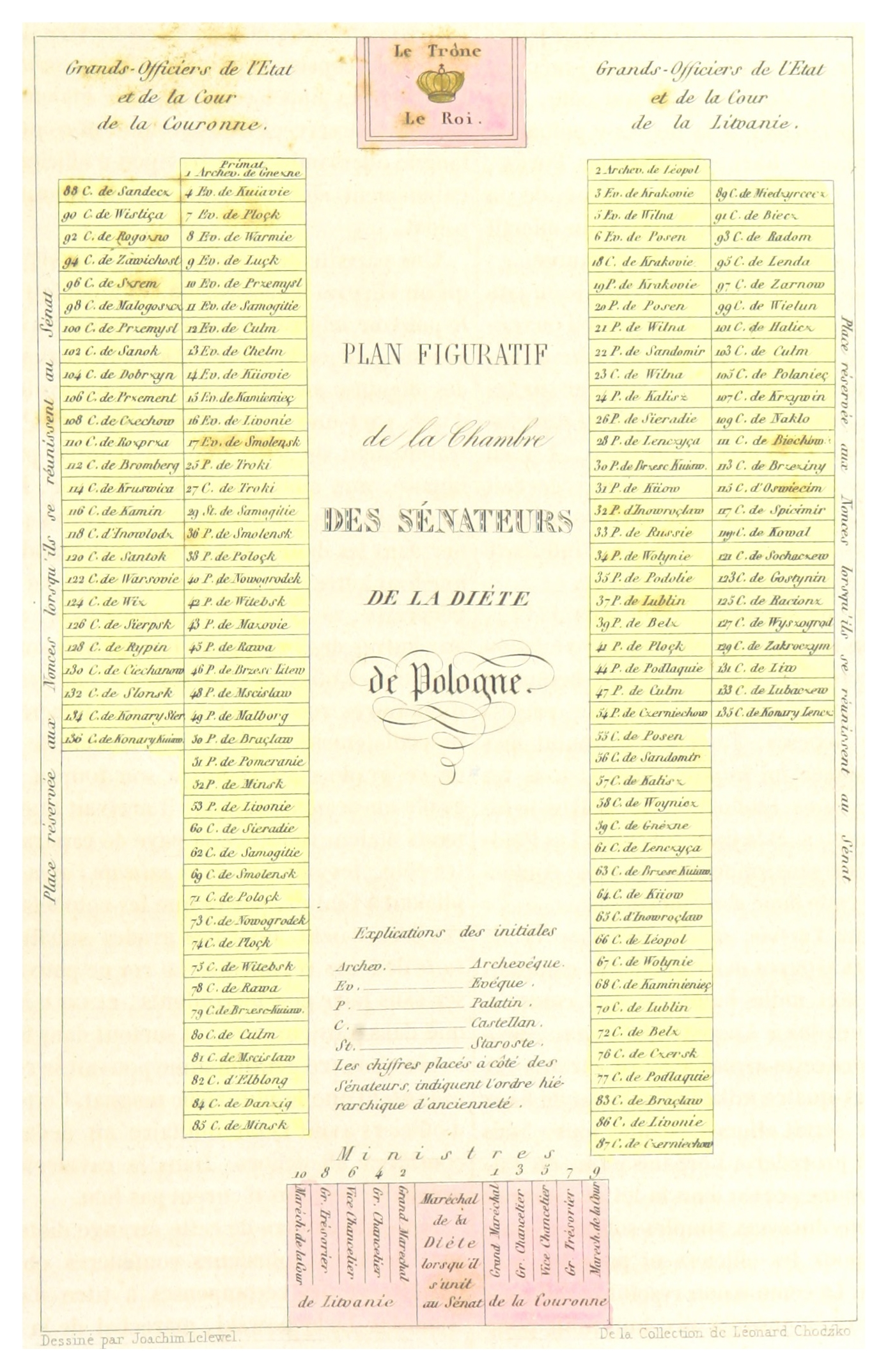
Seating chart of the Senate

The sejm comprised two chambers, with varying numbers of deputies. After the 1569 Union of Lublin, the Kingdom of Poland was transformed into the federation of the Polish–Lithuanian Commonwealth and the numbers of sejm participants were significantly increased with the inclusion of the deputies from Lithuanian sejmiks. The deputies had no set term of office, although in practice it was about four months long, from their election at a regional sejmik, to their report on the next sejmik dedicated to hearing and discussing the previous sejm's proceedings (those sejmiks were known as relational or debriefing). Deputies had parliamentary immunity and any crimes against them were classified as lèse-majesté.

The two chambers were:

- The senate (senat) consisting of high ecclesiastical and secular officials; it was an evolution of the royal council. The senate numbered over 140 bishops and Senatorial offices of the Polish–Lithuanian Commonwealth; it grew from 149 around 1598–1633 to 153 around 1764–1768, and 157 during the era of the Great Sejm (1788–92). The Constitution of May 3 set their number at 132.
- The lower house, Chamber of Deputies (izba poselska), the sejm proper, of lower ranking officials and general nobility. In the Polish–Lithuanian Commonwealth, the number of lower house deputies exceeded that of the senators. In 1569 it was composed of 170 deputies representing and elected by a local sejmiks. The 170 included 48 from Lithuania. Deputies from several cities and towns were allowed a status of observers. The number of deputies grew to around 236 in 1764–68, dropping to 181 during the time of the Great Sejm (1788–92). The Constitution of May 3 set their number at 204, including 24 non-voting representatives from cities and towns.

The Constitution of May 3 specified that the deputies were elected for two years, and did not require reelection in that period if any extraordinary sejms were to be called. Senators, for the most part, were selected by the king from a number of candidates presented by the sejmiks.

Due to population size differences between Lithuania and Poland, the Grand Duchy had three times less representatives than the Crown. Usually larger voivodeships could send 6 deputies, smaller 2; ziemias, depending on their sizes, would send 2 or 1. Numbers of deputies elected to the sejm by sejmiks from particular localities, in the order of precedence, based on a 1569 decree, were as follows:

| # | Constituency | Voivodeship | Deputies |
|---|---|---|---|
| 1 | Kraków | Kraków | 6 |
| 2 | Poznań | Poznań | 6 |
| 3 | Oświęcim–Zator | Kraków | 2 |
| 4 | Vilnius | Vilnius | 2 |
| 5 | Ashmyany | Vilnius | 2 |
| 6 | Lida | Vilnius | 2 |
| 7 | Vilkmergė | Vilnius | 2 |
| 8 | Braslaw | Vilnius | 2 |
| 9 | Sandomierz | Sandomierz | 7 |
| 10 | Kalisz | Kalisz | 6 |
| 11 | Trakai | Trakai | 2 |
| 12 | Hrodna | Trakai | 2 |
| 13 | Kaunas | Trakai | 2 |
| 14 | Upytė | Trakai | 2 |
| 15 | Sieradz | Sieradz | 4 |
| 16 | Wieluń | Sieradz | 2 |
| 17 | Łęczyca | Łęczyca | 4 |
| 18 | Samogitia | Samogitia | 2 |
| 19 | Brześć Kujawski | Brześć Kujawski | 2 |
| 20 | Dobrzyń | Brześć Kujawski | 2 |
| 21 | Kiev | Kiev | 6 |
| 22 | Inowrocław | Inowrocław | 2 |
| 23 | Lviv | Ruthenia | 2 |
| 24 | Przemyśl | Ruthenia | 2 |
| 25 | Sanok | Ruthenia | 2 |
| 26 | Halych | Ruthenia | 2 |
| 27 | Chełm | Ruthenia | 2 |
| 28 | Volhynia | Volhynia | 6 |
| 29 | Podolia | Podolia | 6 |
| 30 | Smolensk | Smolensk | 2 |
| 31 | Starodub | Smolensk | 2 |
| 32 | Lublin | Lublin | 3 |
| 33 | Polotsk | Polotsk | 2 |
| 34 | Belz | Belz | 4 |

| # | Constituency | Voivodeship | Deputies |
|---|---|---|---|
| 35 | Navahrudak | Navahrudak | 2 |
| 36 | Slonim | Navahrudak | 2 |
| 37 | Vawkavysk | Navahrudak | 2 |
| 38 | Płock | Płock | 2 |
| 39 | Vitebsk | Vitebsk | 2 |
| 40 | Orsha | Vitebsk | 2 |
| 41 | Czersk | Masovia | 2 |
| 42 | Warsaw | Masovia | 2 |
| 43 | Wizna | Masovia | 2 |
| 44 | Wyszogród | Masovia | 2 |
| 45 | Zakroczym | Masovia | 2 |
| 46 | Ciechanów | Masovia | 2 |
| 47 | Łomża | Masovia | 2 |
| 48 | Różan | Masovia | 2 |
| 49 | Liw | Masovia | 2 |
| 50 | Nur | Masovia | 2 |
| 51 | Drohiczyn | Podlachia | 2 |
| 52 | Bielsk Podlaski | Podlachia | 2 |
| 53 | Mielnik | Podlachia | 2 |
| 54 | Rawa Mazowiecka | Rawa Mazowiecka | 2 |
| 55 | Sochaczew | Rawa Mazowiecka | 2 |
| 56 | Gostynin | Rawa Mazowiecka | 2 |
| 57 | Brest-Litovsk | Brest-Litovsk | 2 |
| 58 | Pinsk | Brest-Litovsk | 2 |
| 59 | Chełmno | Chełmno | 2 |
| 60 | Mstsislaw | Mstsislaw | 2 |
| 61 | Malbork | Malbork | 2 |
| 62 | Bratslav | Bratslav | 6 |
| 63 | Gdańsk | Pomerania | 2 |
| 64 | Minsk | Minsk | 2 |
| 65 | Mazyr | Minsk | 2 |
| 66 | Rechytsa | Minsk | 2 |
| 67 | Livonia | Livonia | 6 |
| 68 | Chernihiv | Chernihiv | 4 |

== Sejm gatherings ==
=== Proceedings ===
A sejm began with a solemn mass, a verification of deputies mandates, and election of the Marshal of the Sejm (also known as the Speaker). (The position of the Marshal of the Sejm (and sejmik) who presided over the proceedings and was elected from the body of deputies evolved in the 17th century.) Next, the kanclerz (chancellor) declared the king's intentions to both chambers, who would then debate separately till the ending ceremonies.

After 1543 the resolutions were written in Polish rather than Latin. All legislation adopted by a given sejm formed a whole and was published as a "constitution" of the sejm. Prior to the May 3 Constitution, in Poland the term "constitution" (Polish: konstytucja) had denoted all the legislation, of whatever character, that had been passed at a sejm. Only with the adoption of the May 3 Constitution did konstytucja assume its modern sense of a fundamental document of governance. From the end of the 16th century, the constitutions were printed, stamped with the royal seal, and sent to the chancelleries of the municipal councils of all voivodeships of the Crown and also to the Grand Duchy of Lithuania. Such constitutions were often subjected to some final tweaking by the royal court before being printed, although that could lead to protests among the nobility. Moreover, per 1569 Union of Lublin stipulations, such constitutions were void in the Grand Duchy of Lithuania until they were confirmed by affixing the Great Seal of Lithuania, which was possessed by the Grand Chancellor of Lithuania, or the Lesser Seal of Lithuania, which was possessed by the Vice-Chancellor of Lithuania. The Grand Chancellor of Lithuania and Vice-Chancellor of Lithuania were regarded as guardians of the laws and were obliged to refuse to affix the Lithuanian seals to any documents that would violate the laws or act to the detriment of the state.

=== Location ===
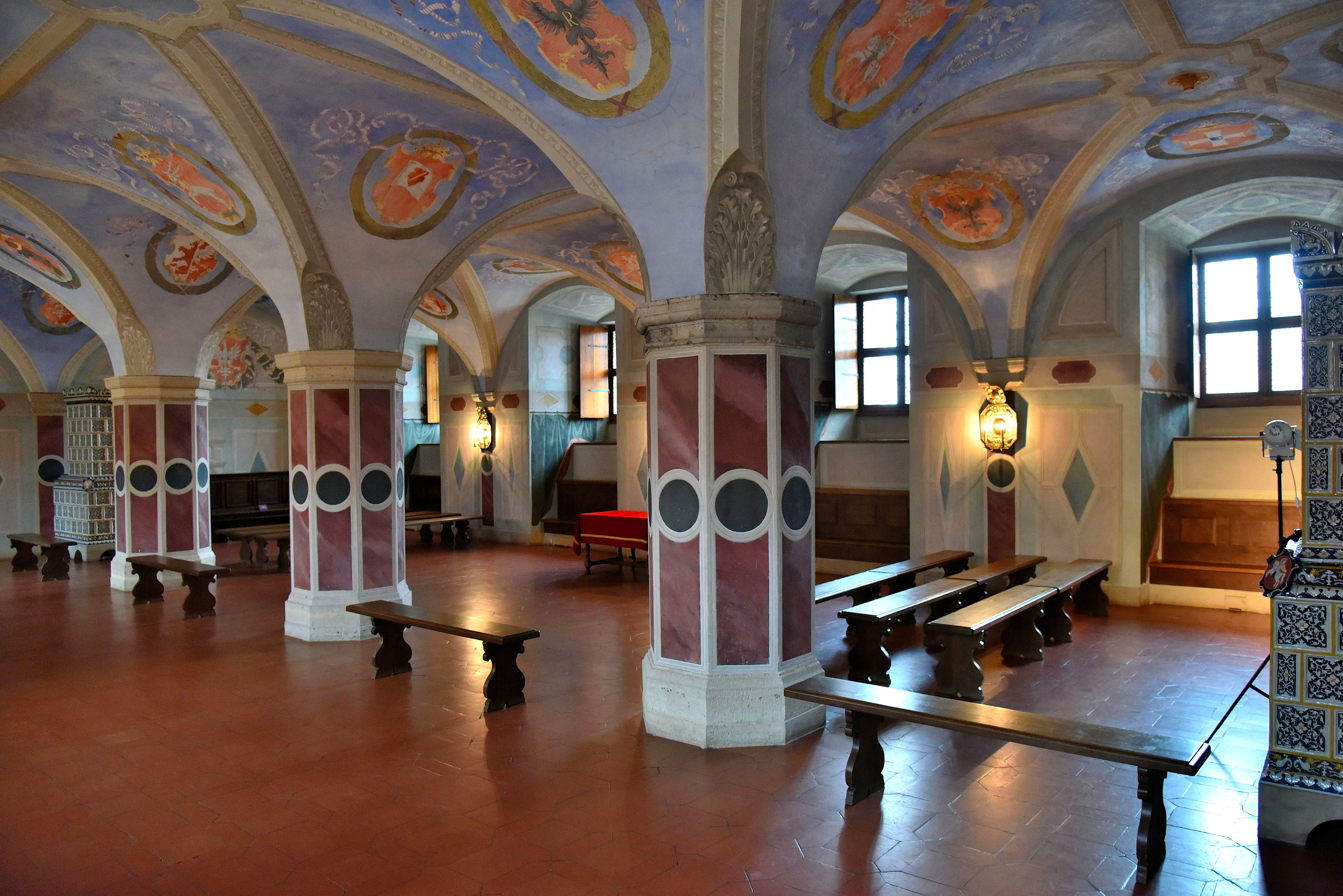
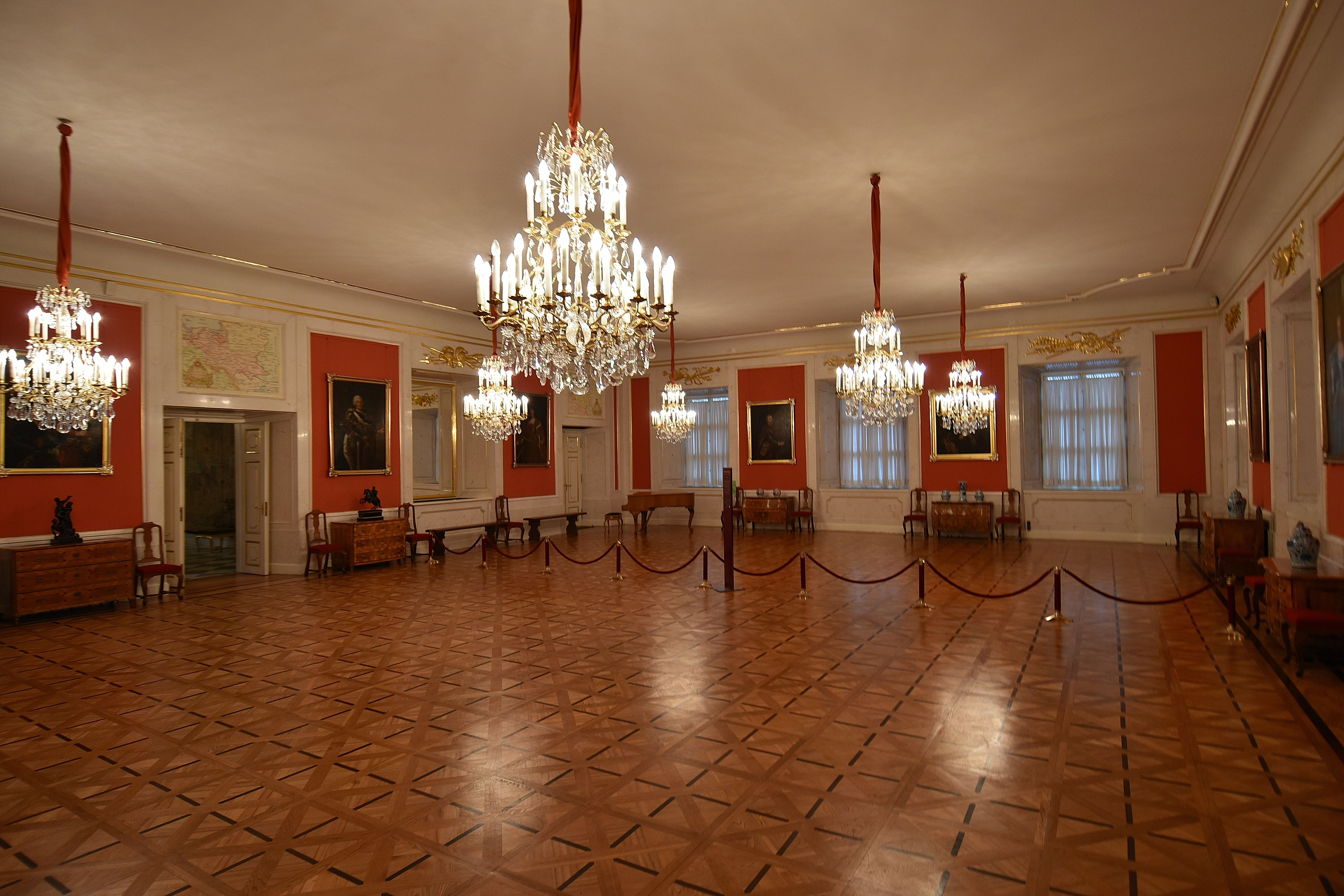
Old and New Chamber of Deputies at the Royal Castle, Warsaw

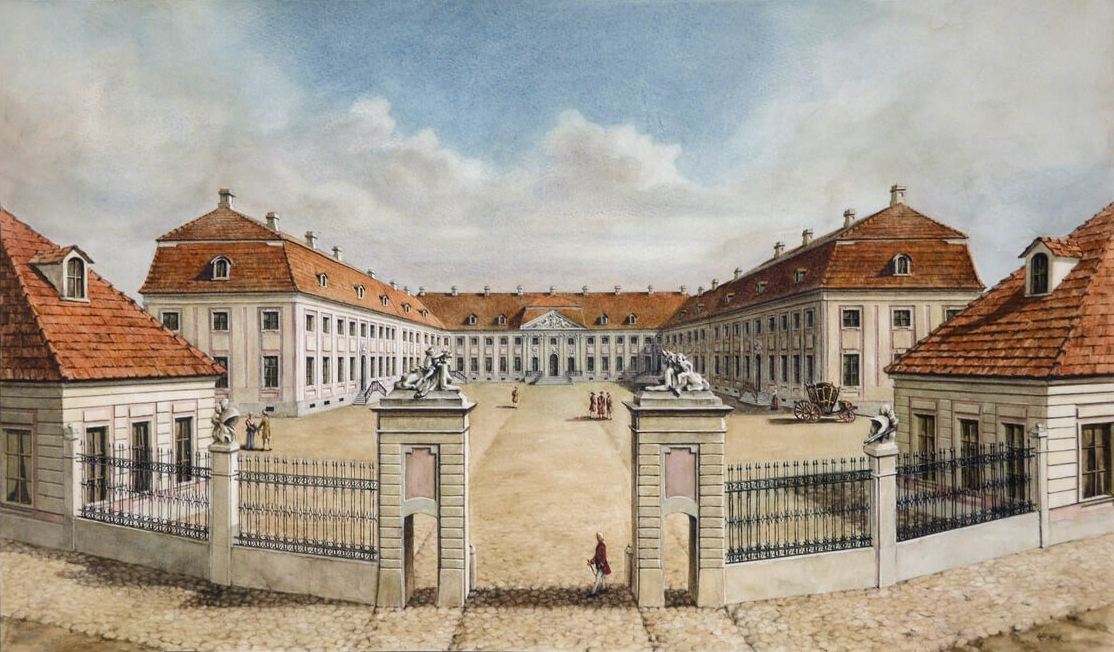
New Grodno Castle, where most of the federal Polish–Lithuanian sejms in the territory of Lithuania were held, including the last one in 1793

The majority of the sejms were held at the Warsaw's Royal Castle. A few were held elsewhere, particularly in the first years of the Polish–Lithuanian Commonwealth, and, following the adoption of a 1673 constitution (law) initiated by the Lithuanian Grand Chancellor Krzysztof Zygmunt Pac, from 1673 every third sejm was to take place at Grodno in the Grand Duchy of Lithuania (first hosted in the Old Hrodna Castle, later in the New Hrodna Castle). In practice, most of the sejms were still held in Warsaw, which hosted 148 sejms, compared to 11 sejms hosted in Grodno.

Grodno, which until 1793 was only one of four powiats centres of the Trakai Voivodeship, was three times smaller than Lithuanian capital city Vilnius, which suffered immense damage during the 1655 battle, including the Palace of the Grand Dukes of Lithuania, thus Vilnius following the Russian occupation and 1661 liberation by the Grand Ducal Lithuanian Army had no functioning Polish–Lithuanian monarchs residence anymore and none of the federal Polish–Lithuanian sejms were held in Vilnius, although until 1569 Union of Lublin it was the most frequent host of the Sejm of the Grand Duchy of Lithuania and in 1576–1671 hosted the conventions of the Grand Duchy of Lithuania. Polish–Lithuanian monarch Augustus III even described Grodno as "hated small town" and Polish nobles reluctantly travelled to the federal Polish–Lithuanian sejms in Grodno. During the reign of Stanisław August Poniatowski only two federal Polish–Lithuanian sejms were held in Grodno (in 1784 and 1793). In his welcoming speech during the 1784 Grodno Sejm Kazimierz Nestor Sapieha mildly reproached Poniatowski that "It has been thirty-two years already that Lithuania did not see legislative meetings in its nest". The last federal Polish–Lithuanian sejm was held in Grodno since 17 June 1793 and its participants were threatened by the Imperial Russian Army, which during the convenings multiple times encircled the Grodno Castle, Russian officers attended the Hall of the Sejm and influenced the Sejm decisions.

The sejms in Warsaw were held in the Warsaw Castle, within the Chamber of Deputies (Hall of Three Pillars), with the upper Senate Chamber located literally above it. In the late 17th century, new quarters were constructed for the Chamber of Deputies, and were joined on the same level by the senate quarters in the mid-18th century. The new Senate Chamber was the larger of the two, as it was intended to host both chambers during the opening and closing ceremonies.

=== Duration and frequency ===
In the mid-15th century the general sejm of the Kingdom of Poland met about once per year. There was no set time span to elapse before the next session was to be called by the king. If the general sejm did not happen, local sejmiks would debate on current issues instead.

King Henry's Articles, signed by each king since 1573, required the king to call a general sejm (lasting six weeks) every two years, and provisions for an extraordinary sejm (Polish: sejm ekstraordynaryjny, nadzwyczajny) that was to last two weeks were also set down in this act. Extraordinary sejms could be called in times of national emergency, for example a sejm deciding whether to call pospolite ruszenie (a general call to arms) in response to an invasion. The sejm could be extended if all the deputies agreed. No set time of a year was defined, but customarily sejms were called for a time that would not interfere with the supervision of agriculture, which formed the livelihood of most nobility; thus most sejms took place in late fall or early winter.

After the Constitution of 3 May 1791, sejms were to be held every two years and last 70 days, with a provision for an extension to 100 days. Provisions for extraordinary sejms were made, as well as for a special constitutional sejm, which was to meet and discuss whether any revisions to the constitution were needed (that one was to deliberate every 25 years).

It is estimated that between 1493 and 1793 sejms were held 240 times. Jędruch gives a higher number of 245, and notes that 192 of those were successfully completed, passing legislation. 32 sejms were vetoed with the infamous liberum veto, particularly in the first half of the 18th century. The last two sejms of the Commonwealth were the irregular four-year Great Sejm (1788–92), which passed the Constitution of the 3 May, and the infamous Grodno Sejm (1793) where deputies, bribed or coerced by the Russian Empire following the Commonwealth defeat in the War in Defense of the Constitution, annulled the short-lived Constitution and passed the act of Second Partition of Poland.

== Special sessions ==
=== Royal elections ===
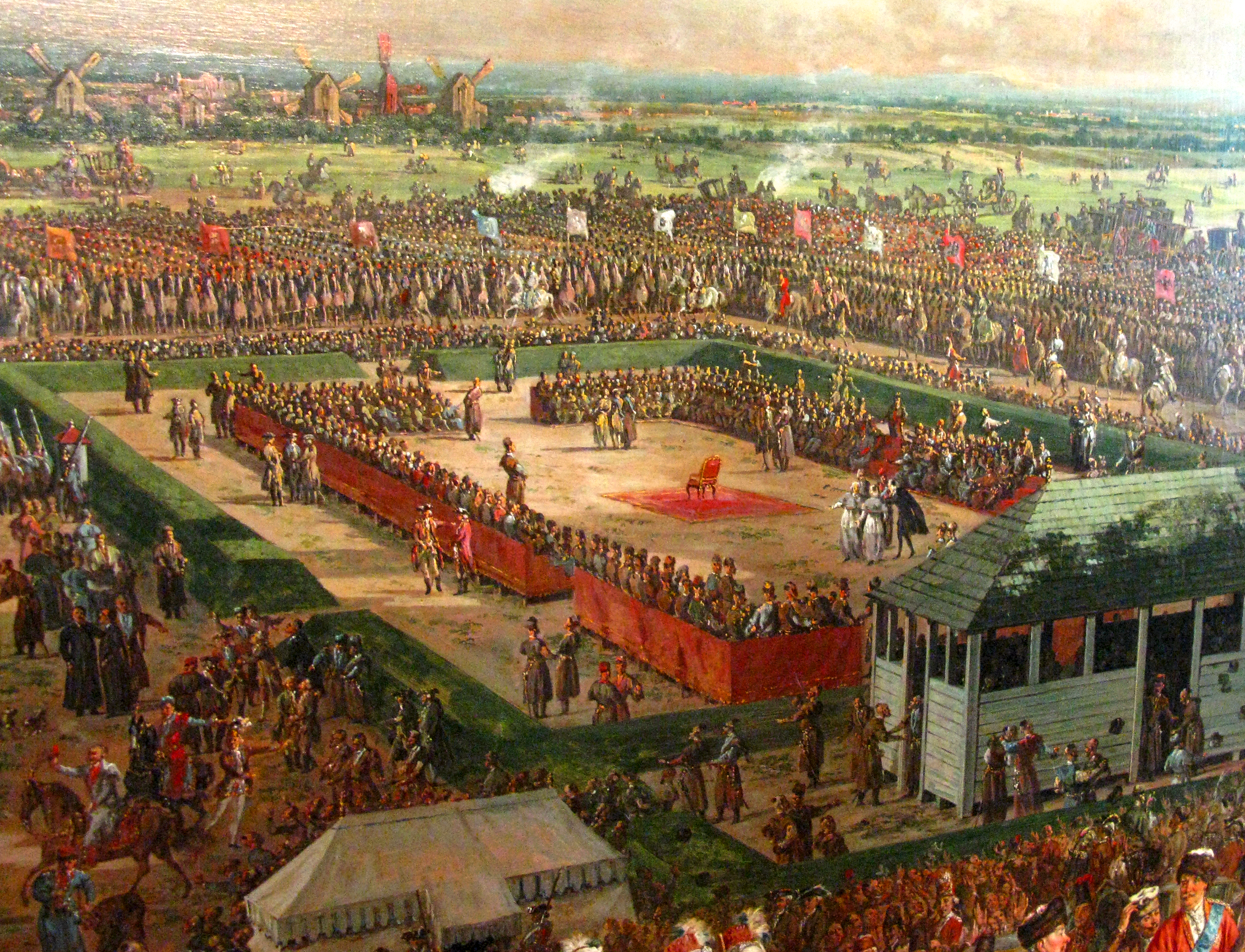
Election of Stanisław August Poniatowski in 1764 (detail)

In addition to the regular sessions of the general sejm, three special types of sejms handled the process of the royal election in the interregnum period. Those were:

- Convocation sejm (Sejm konwokacyjny). This sejm was called upon a death or abdication of a king by the Primate of Poland. The deputies would focus on establishing the dates and any special rules for the election (in particular, preparation of pacta conventa, bills of nobility privileges to be sworn by the king), and screening the candidates. This sejm was to last two weeks.
- Election sejm (Sejm elekcyjny), during which the nobility voted for the candidate to the throne. This type of sejm was open to all members of the nobility who desired to attend it, and as such they often gathered much larger number of attendees than the regular sejms. The exact numbers of attendees have never been recorded, and are estimated to vary from 10,000 to over 100,000; subsequently the voting could last for days (in 1573 it was recorded that it took four days). To handle the increased numbers, those sejms would be held in Wola, then a village near Warsaw. Royal candidates themselves were barred from attending this sejm, but were allowed to send representatives. This sejm was to last six weeks.
- Coronation sejm (Sejm koronacyjny). This sejm was held in Kraków, where the coronation ceremony was traditionally held by the primate, who relinquished his powers to the chosen king. This sejm was to last two weeks.

=== Other special sessions ===
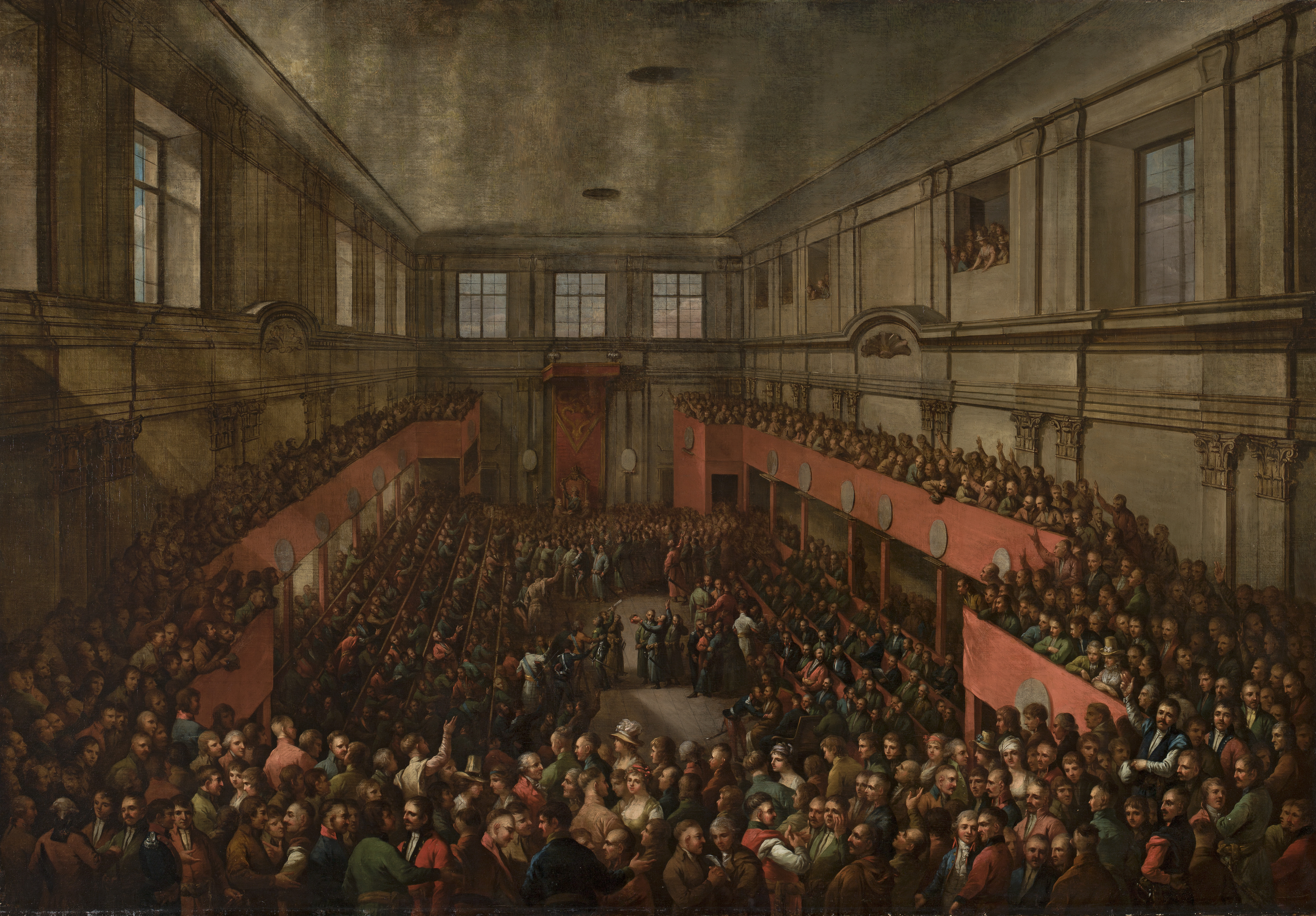
The Constitution of 3 May 1791 is adopted by the Four-Year Sejm and Senate at the Royal Castle, Warsaw

Confederated sejm (Sejm skonfederowany) first appeared in 1573 (all convocation and election sejms were confederated), and became more popular in the 18th century as a counter to the disruption of liberum veto. Seen as emergency or extraordinary sessions, they relied on majority voting to speed up the discussions and ensure a legislative outcome. Many royal election sejms were confederated, as well as some of the normal sejm walny (general sejm) sessions.

Jędruch, who classifies the regular general sejm session as ordinary, in addition to the convocation, election and coronation sessions, also distinguished the following additional types:

- Council of state
- Constitutional
- Delegation (ending with a formation of committees)
- Extraordinary
- General sejmik held instead of a sejm
- General council (rada walna) without the king present. That sejm would be convoked by the primate when the king could not attend and had no legislative powers. It was attended by deputies from the preceding sejm. Held three times (in 1576, 1710 and 1734).
- Inquest, debating the case of royal impeachment. Two such sejms were held (in 1592 and 1646).
- Pacification, to quell a potential civil war after a disputed election, to pacify the opponents through political concessions. Five such sejms were held (in 1598, 1673, 1698, 1699 and 1735).

== See also ==
- Order of precedence in the Polish–Lithuanian Commonwealth
