= Union of Lublin =

1569 union of Poland and Lithuania

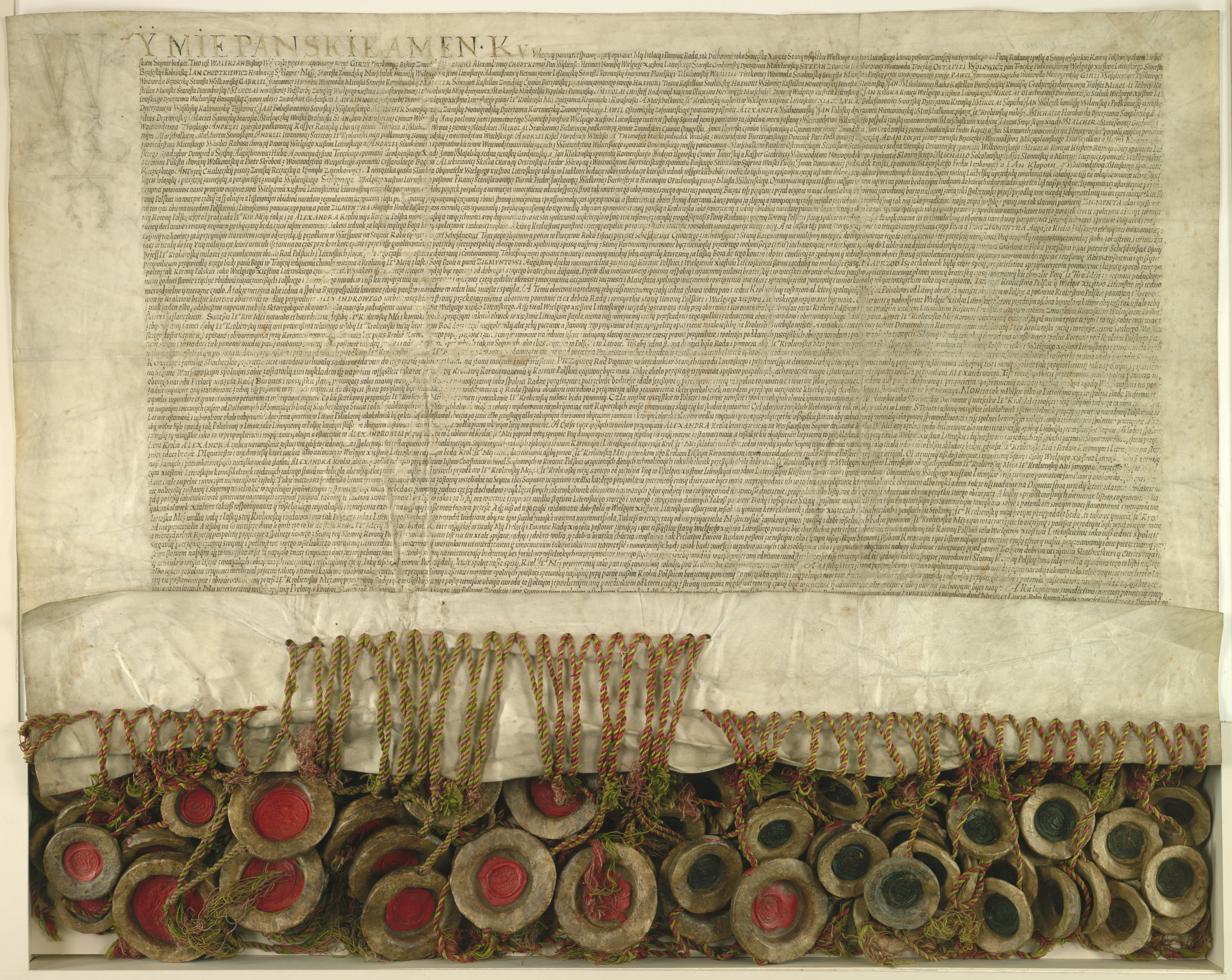
Act of the Union of Lublin, 1569

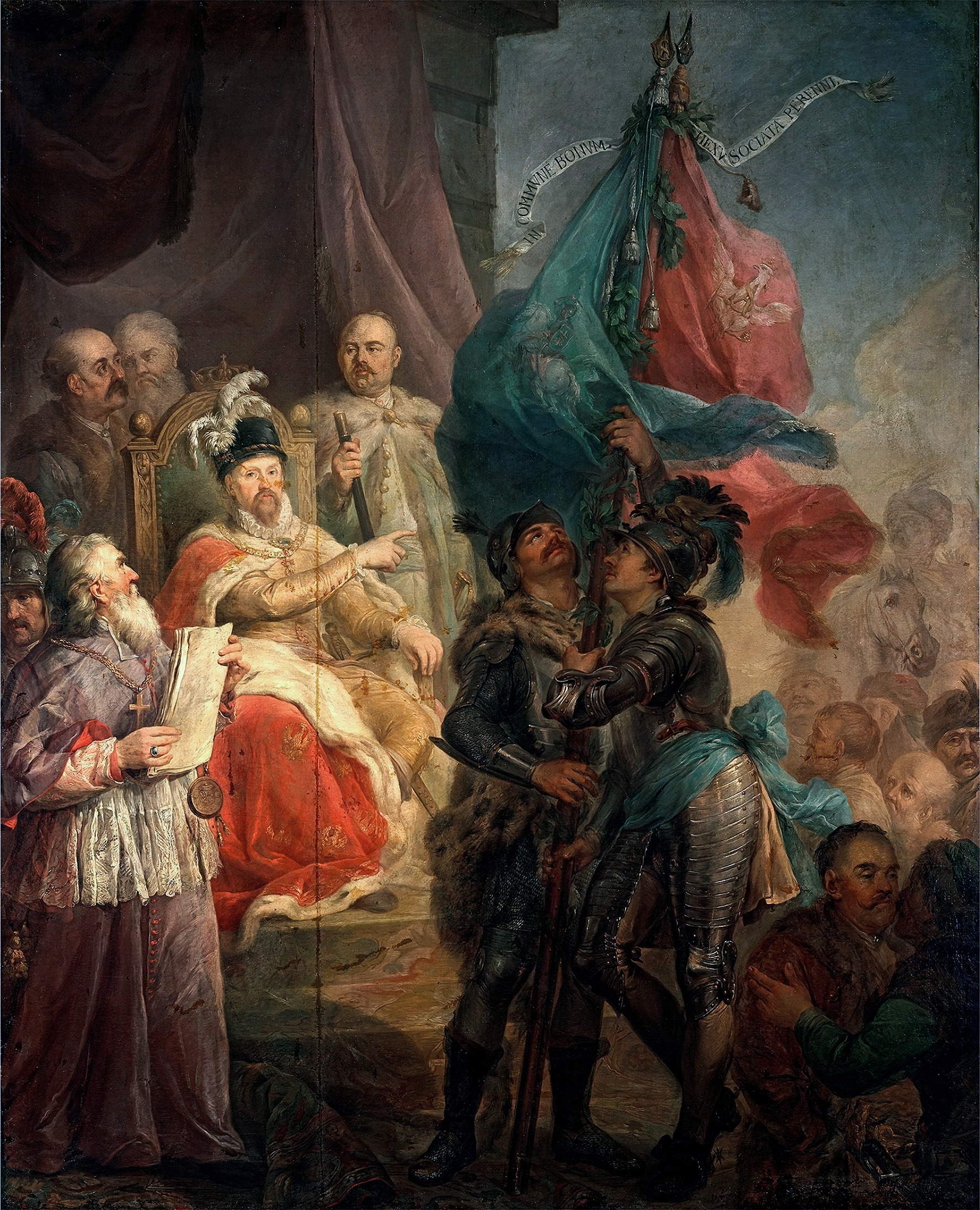
The Union of Lublin, a painting by Marcello Bacciarelli. Two knights hold entangled banners with the coats of arms of both states. A ribbon flutters over them with the inscription: IN COMMVNE BONVM - [COMPL]EXV SOCIATA PERENNI ("For the common good - united forever").

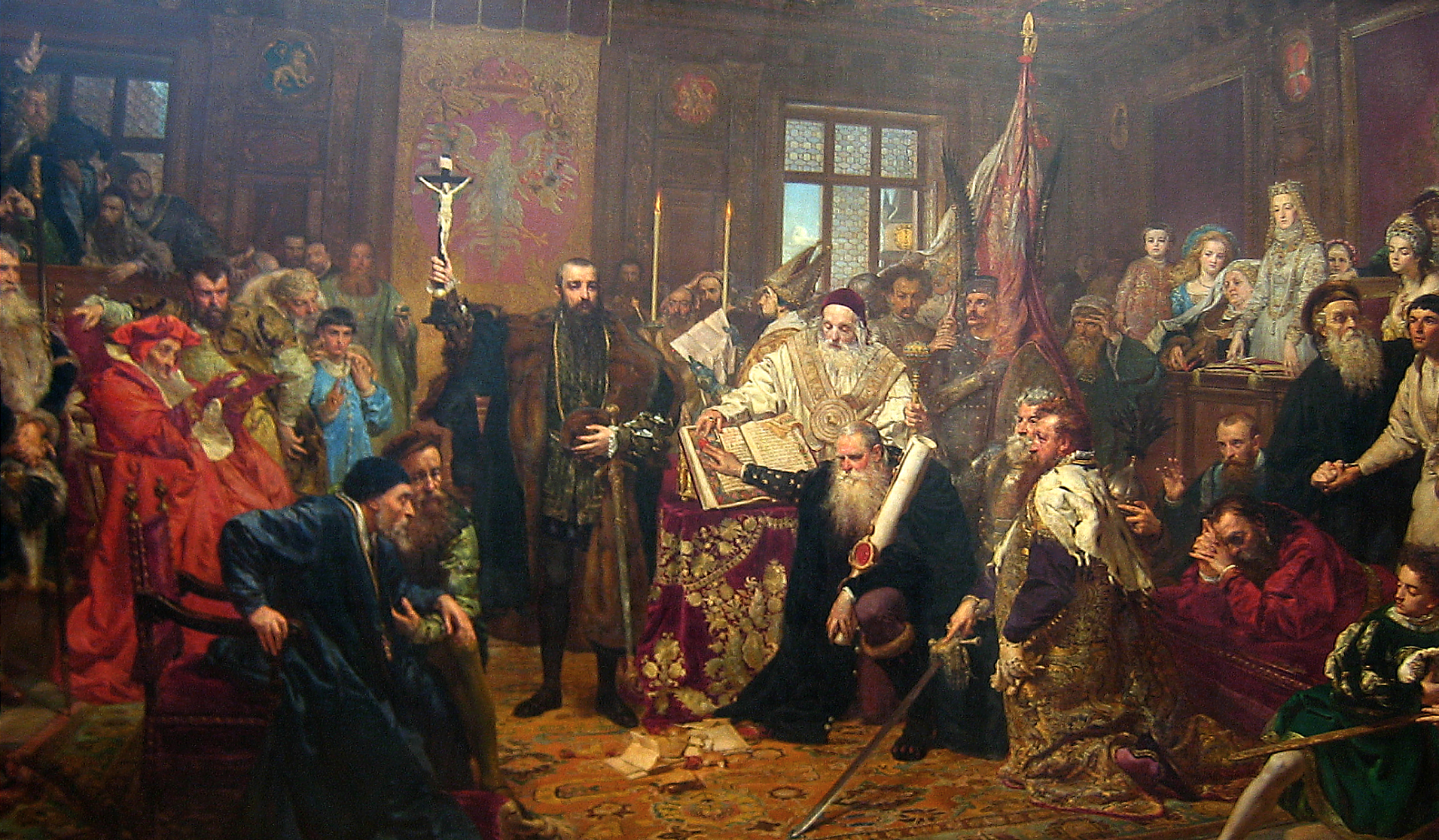
The Union of Lublin, a painting by Jan Matejko. King Sigismund II Augustus holds the cross at the centre while surrounded by statesmen, diplomats, the clergy and nobles.

The Union of Lublin (Polish: Unia lubelska; Lithuanian: Liublino unija) was signed on 1 July 1569 in Lublin, Poland, and created a single state, the Polish–Lithuanian Commonwealth, one of the largest countries in Europe at the time. It replaced the personal union of the Crown of the Kingdom of Poland and the Grand Duchy of Lithuania with a real union and an elective monarchy, as Sigismund II Augustus, the last of the Jagiellons, remained childless after three marriages. In addition, the autonomy of Royal Prussia was largely abandoned. The Duchy of Livonia, tied to Lithuania in real union since the Union of Grodno (1566), became a Polish–Lithuanian condominium.

The Commonwealth was ruled by a single elected monarch who carried out the duties of King of Poland and Grand Duke of Lithuania, and governed with a common Senate and parliament (the Sejm). The Union is seen by some as an evolutionary stage in the Polish–Lithuanian alliance and personal union, necessitated also by Lithuania's dangerous position in wars with Russia.

== History ==
=== Background ===
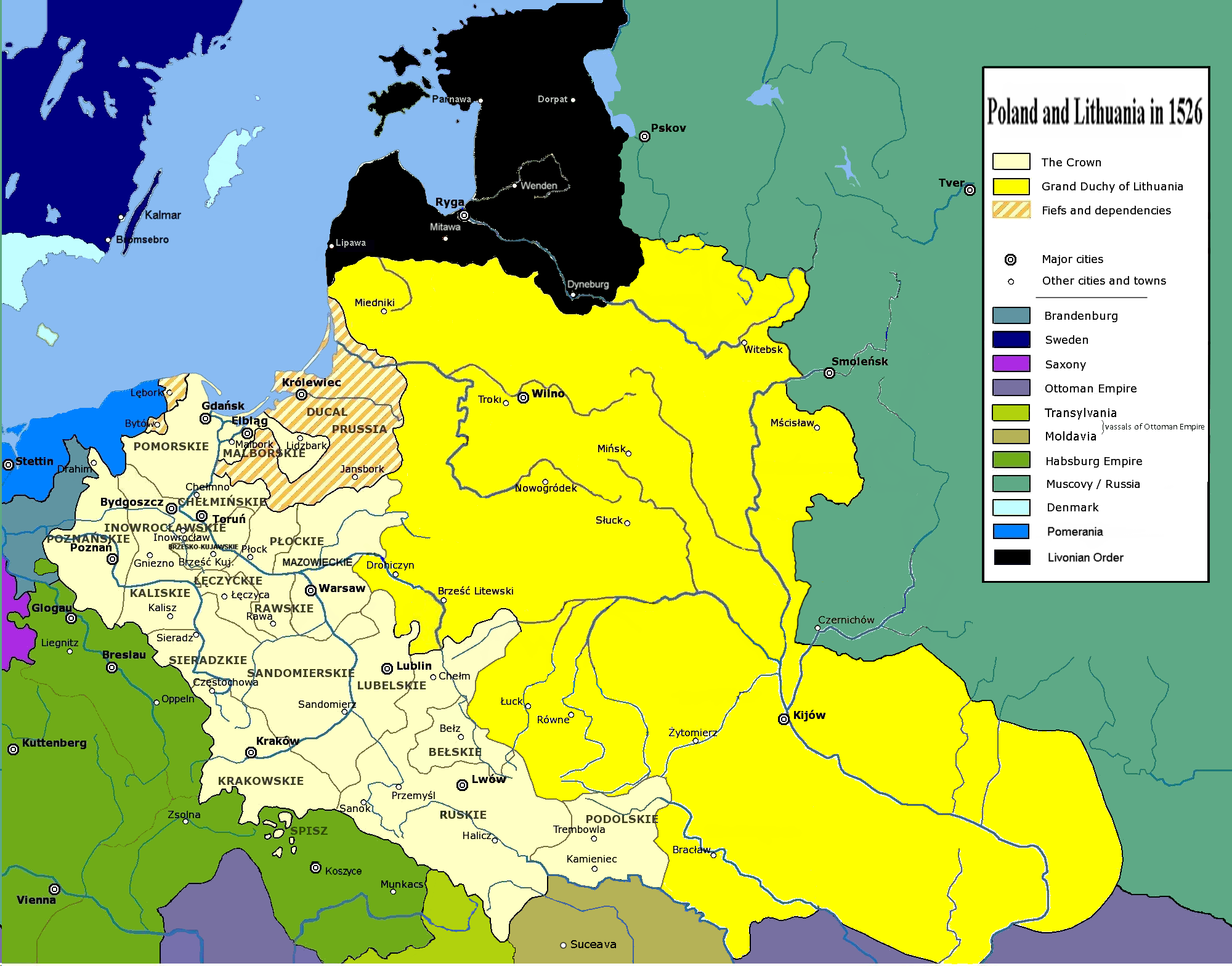
Poland and Lithuania in 1526, before the Union of Lublin

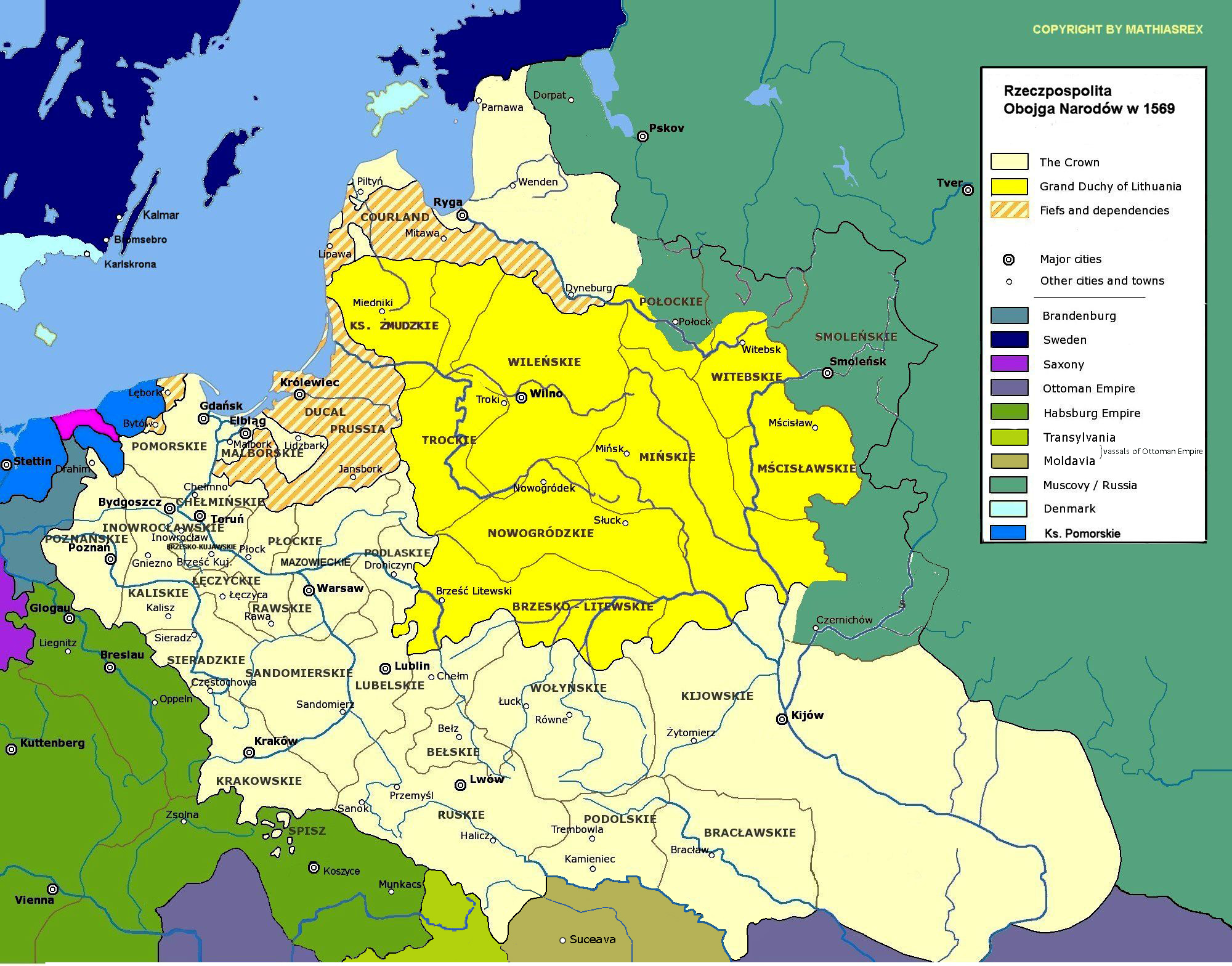
The Polish-Lithuanian Commonwealth in 1569

There were long discussions before signing the union treaty. Lithuanian magnates were afraid of losing much of their power, since the union would make their legal status equal to that of the much more numerous Polish lower nobility. Lithuania had been increasingly on the losing side of the Muscovite–Lithuanian Wars, however, and by the second half of the 16th century, it faced the threat of total defeat in the Livonian War and incorporation into the Tsardom of Russia. The Polish nobility (the szlachta), on the other hand, were reluctant to offer more help to Lithuania without receiving anything in exchange (as much as 70% of the taxes collected in Poland in the 1560s went to support Lithuania in its war with Moscow). The Polish and Lithuanian elites strengthened personal bonds and had opportunities to plan their united futures during increased military cooperation.

Sigismund II Augustus, King of Poland and Grand Duke of Lithuania, seeing the threat to Lithuania and eventually to Poland, pressed for the union, gradually gaining more followers until he felt enough support to forcibly evict landowners who opposed the transition of territory from Lithuania to Poland. A clear motivation for Sigismund was that he was the last Jagiello and had no children or brothers who could inherit the throne. Therefore, the Union was an attempt to preserve the continuity of his dynasty's work since the personal (but not constitutional) union of Poland and Lithuania as a result of the marriage of Jadwiga and Jogaila. The Union was one of the constitutional changes required to establish a formal elective monarchy, which would simultaneously reign over both domains.

=== Sejm of 1569 ===
The Sejm met in January 1569, near the Polish town of Lublin, but did not reach an agreement (sejm of 1569 in Lublin). One of the points of contention was the right of Poles to settle and own land in the Grand Duchy. After most of the Lithuanian delegation under the leadership of Vilnius Voivodeship's Mikołaj "Rudy" Radziwiłł left Lublin on 1 March, the king responded by annexing Podlachie, Volhynian, Bracław, and the Kiev Voivodeships to the Crown (on 6 June), with wide approval from the local gentry. Those historic lands of Rus' are over half of modern Ukraine and were then a substantial portion of the Grand Duchy of Lithuania's territory. The Rus' nobles there were eager to capitalise on the economic and political opportunities offered by the Polish sphere, and by and large, they wanted their lands to become a part of the Polish Crown.

The Lithuanians were forced to return to the Sejm under the leadership of Jan Hieronimowicz Chodkiewicz (father of Jan Karol Chodkiewicz) and to continue negotiations, using slightly different tactics from those of Radziwiłł. Though the Polish szlachta wanted full incorporation of the Grand Duchy of Lithuania into the Crown, the Lithuanians continued to oppose that and agreed only to a federal state. On 28 June 1569, the last objections were overcome, and on 4 July, an act was accordingly signed by the king at Lublin Castle.

== Attempts at modernisation ==
The Union of Lublin was superseded by the Constitution of 3 May 1791, under which the federal Commonwealth was to be transformed into a unitary state by King Stanisław August Poniatowski. The status of semi-federal state was restored by the Reciprocal Guarantee of Two Nations. The constitution was not fully implemented, however, and the Commonwealth was ended with the Partitions of Poland in 1795.

== Aftermath ==
=== Cultural ===
Religions in Polish-Lithuanian Commonwealth in 1750: mostly Roman Catholic in the west and Eastern Catholic (Byzantine rite) in the east (orange color)

After the Union, the Lithuanian nobles had the same formal rights as the Polish to rule the lands and subjects under their control. However, political advancement in the Catholic-dominated Commonwealth was a different matter.

By the late 15th century, the Polish language was already making rapid inroads among the Lithuanian and Rus' elites. The Lublin Union accelerated the process of Polonization. In culture and social life, both the Polish language and Catholicism became dominant for the Ruthenian nobility, most of whom were initially Ruthenian-speaking and Eastern Orthodox by religion. However the commoners, especially the peasants, continued to speak their own languages and after the Union of Brest converted to Eastern Catholicism.

This eventually created a significant rift between the lower social classes and the nobility in the Lithuanian and Ruthenian areas of the Commonwealth. Some Ruthenian magnates resisted Polonization (like the Ostrogskis) by adhering to Orthodox Christianity, giving generously to the Ruthenian Orthodox Churches and to the Ruthenian schools. However, the pressure of Polonization was harder to resist with each subsequent generation and eventually almost all of the Ruthenian nobility was Polonized.

The Cossack uprisings and foreign interventions led to the partitions of the Commonwealth by Russia, Prussia and Austria in 1772, 1793, and 1795. The Union of Lublin was also temporarily inactive while the Union of Kėdainiai was in effect.

Many historians like Krzysztof Rak consider the Union of Lublin to have created a state similar to the present-day European Union, thus considering the Union (along with the Kalmar Union, the several Acts of Union in the British Isles and other similar treaties) to be a predecessor of the Maastricht Treaty. The former, however, created a state of countries more deeply linked than the present-day European Union.

=== Economic ===
The union brought about the Polish colonization of Ruthenian lands and increasing enserfment of Ruthenian peasantry by the szlachta. Although the conditions for peasants in the Commonwealth was quite dire, compared to the West (see second serfdom), the peasants in the Commonwealth had more freedom than those in Russia; hence peasants (as well as to a lesser extent nobility and merchants) escaping from Russia to the Commonwealth became a major concern for the Russian government, and was one of the factors ultimately leading to the partitions of Poland.

A common coin, the złoty, was introduced.

Execution of crown lands was not extended to the Grand Duchy.

=== Geographical ===
The Union created one of the largest and most populous states in 17th-century Europe (excluding the states not completely in Europe, i.e. the Russian and Ottoman Empires).

As part of the Union, Lithuania lost Podlaskie, Volhynia, Podolia and Kiev voivodeships to the Crown of the Kingdom of Poland.

=== Legal ===
Coat of arms of the Polish–Lithuanian Commonwealth

The Statutes of Lithuania declared the laws of the Union that conflicted with them to be unconstitutional. The First Statute of Lithuania was also used in the territories of Lithuania that were annexed by Poland shortly before the Union of Lublin (except for Podlaskie). These conflicts between statutory schemes in Lithuania and Poland persisted for many years, and the Third Statute of Lithuania remained in force in territories of the Grand Duchy of Lithuania even after partitions, until 1840.

Attempts to limit the power of Lithuanian magnates (especially the Sapieha family) and unify the laws of the Commonwealth led to the koekwacja praw movement, culminating in the koekwacja reforms of the Election Sejm of 1697 (May–June), confirmed in the General Sejm of 1698 (April) in the document Porządek sądzenia spraw w Trybunale Wielkiego Księstwa Litewskego.

=== Military ===
Poland provided military aid in the wars after the union of the two entities, which was crucial for the survival of the Grand Duchy. Poland and the Grand Duchy were to have separate military but common defense policies.

=== Political ===
The Union of Lublin provided for a merger of the two states, though each retained substantial autonomy, with their own army, treasury, laws and administration. Though the countries were in theory equal, the larger Poland became the dominant partner. Due to population differences, Polish deputies outnumbered Lithuanians in the Sejm by 3:1.

There was to be a single ruler for both Poland and the Grand Duchy, freely elected by the nobility of both nations, and crowned as King of Poland and Grand Duke of Lithuania in Wawel Cathedral, Kraków. The demand of a separate inauguration ceremony of the Grand Duke of Lithuania was raised by the nobles of the Grand Duchy of Lithuania (e.g. Mikołaj "the Red" Radziwiłł, Eustachy Wołłowicz, Jan Karol Chodkiewicz, Konstanty Ostrogski) during the negotiations of the Union of Lublin, however it was not officially included into it. Nevertheless, on 29 May 1580, a separate ceremony was held in the Vilnius Cathedral during which bishop Merkelis Giedraitis presented Stephen Báthory (King of Poland since 1 May 1576) a decorated sword and a hat adorned with pearls (both were sanctified by Pope Gregory XIII himself), while this ceremony manifested the sovereignty of the Grand Duchy of Lithuania and had the meaning of elevation of the new Grand Duke of Lithuania, this way ignoring the stipulations of the Union of Lublin.

A common parliament, the Sejm, held its sessions in Warsaw; it had 114 deputies from the Polish lands and 48 from Lithuania. The Senate had 113 Polish and 27 Lithuanian senators.

Poland and the Grand Duchy were to have a common foreign policy.

== Legacy ==
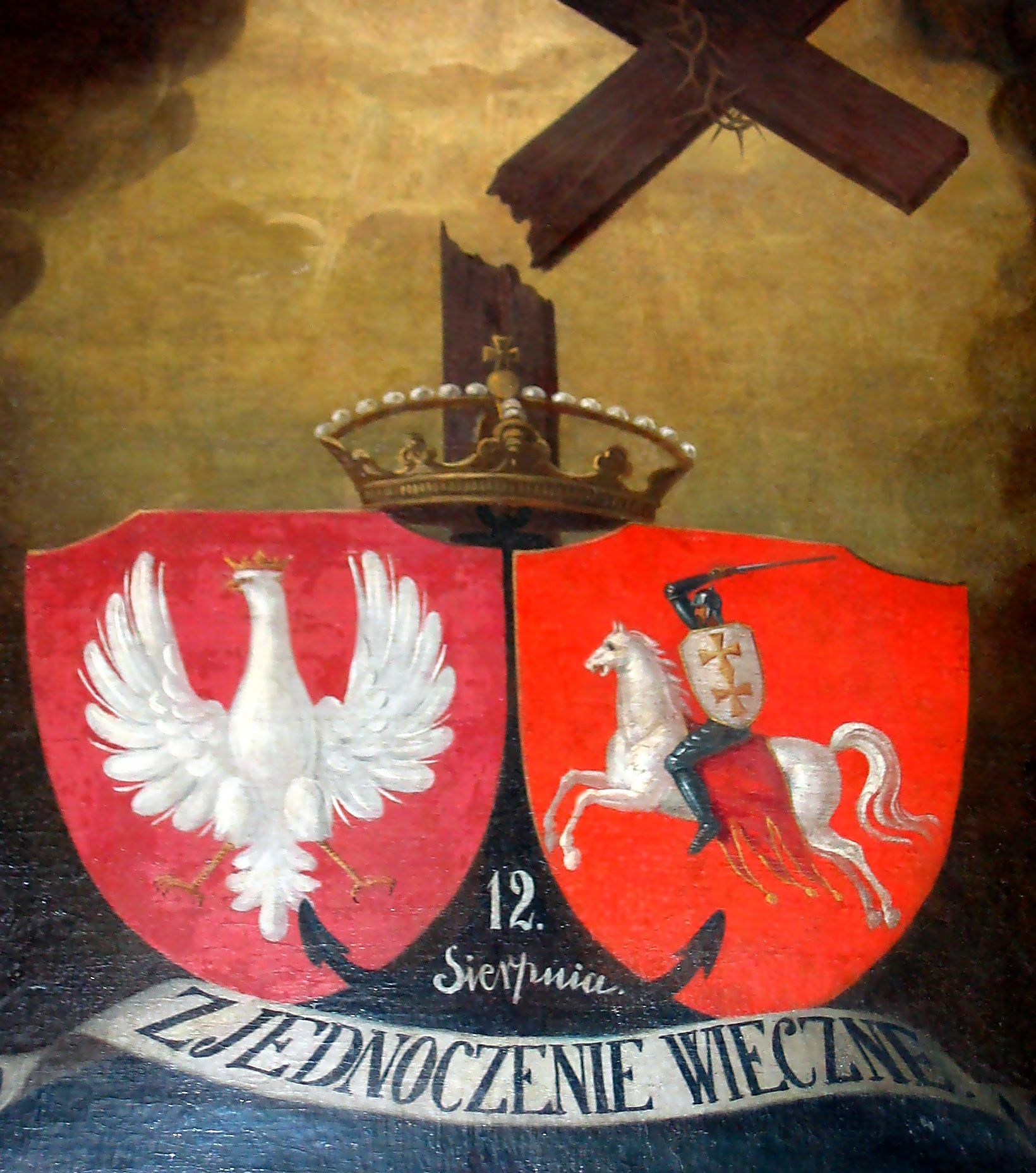
Painting commemorating Polish–Lithuanian union circa 1861; The motto reads "Eternal union."

The Union of Lublin was Sigismund's greatest achievement and his greatest failure. Although it created one of the largest states in contemporary Europe, one that endured for over 200 years, Sigismund failed to push through the reforms that would have established a workable political system. He hoped to strengthen the monarchy with the support of the lesser nobility, and to balance the power of lesser nobility and magnates. However, while all the nobility in the Commonwealth was in theory equal under the law, the political power of the magnates was not weakened significantly, and in the end they could too often bribe or coerce their lesser brethren. In addition, the royal power continued to wane, and while the neighbouring states continued to evolve into strong, centralized absolute monarchies, the Commonwealth slid with its Golden Liberty into a political anarchy that eventually cost it its very existence.

Following the Żeligowski's Mutiny after which the Lithuania's capital Vilnius Region was occupied and which eventually led to the annexation of it into Republic of Poland in 1922, the Lithuanians formally renounced the 1569 Union of Lublin.

Today's Republic of Poland considers itself a successor to the Polish–Lithuanian Commonwealth, whereas the interwar Republic of Lithuania viewed the Commonwealth's creation in mostly negative light.

The original act document was included by UNESCO in the Memory of the World International Register in 2017.

The Lublin Triangle, a regional alliance between Poland, Lithuania, and Ukraine, was named in reference to the Union of Lublin.

== See also ==
- Union of Kėdainiai
- Union of Lublin Mound
