= Sejm court =

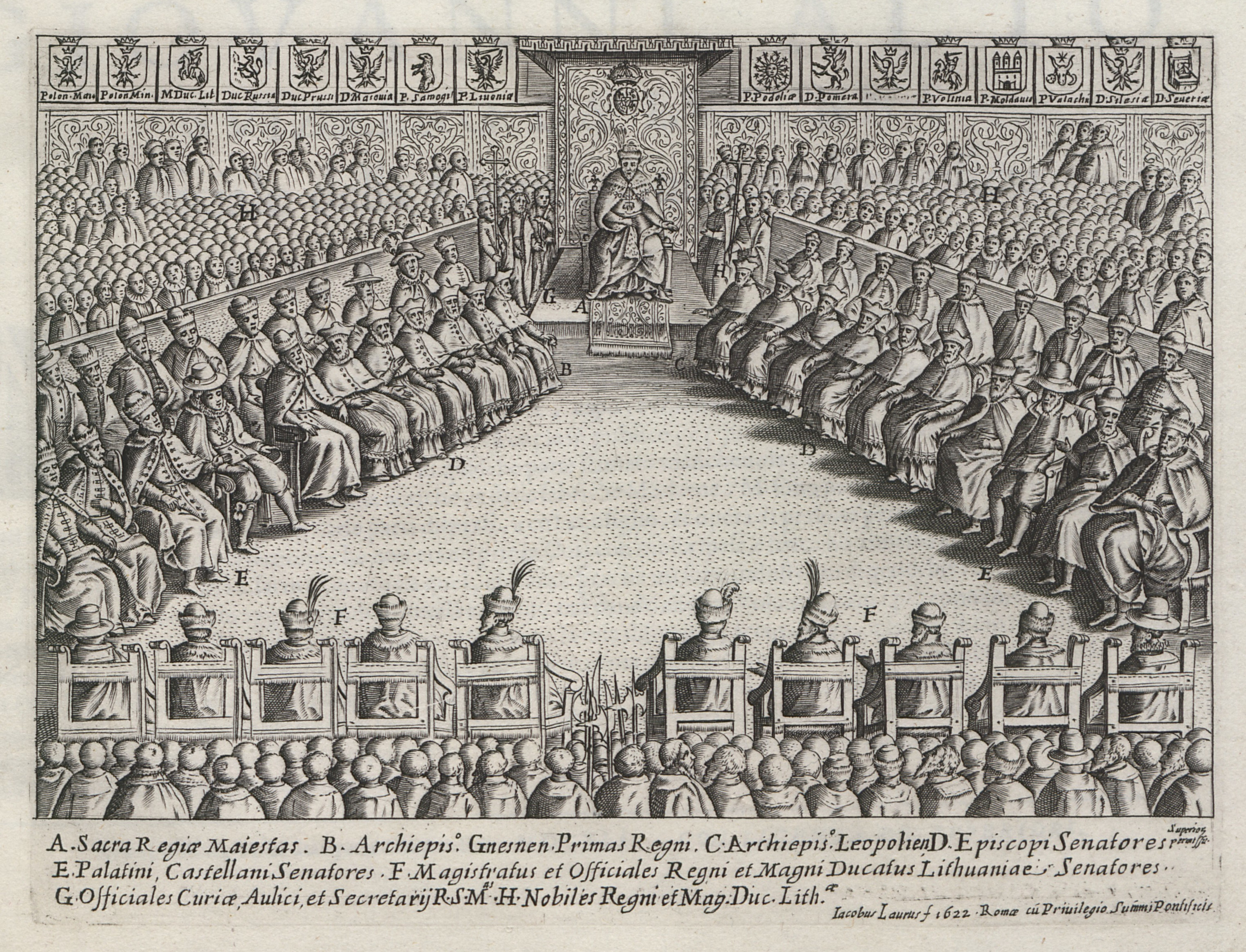
Depiction of the Sejm court under the reign of Sigismund III Vasa (1662)

A sejm court (Polish: Sąd sejmowy) was a judicial body in Poland that existed during the First Polish Republic. The sejm court was used to "judge crimes against the nation and the king."

== Role and composition ==
According to historian Edward Opaliński, the Sejm court was an "integral part of the Parliament", with the court wielding authority over "both appellant and trying gravest crimes." However, Opaliński notes that the Sejm court was permitted to act "only in the course of parliamentary debates; after they ended, its activity ceased."

The court sat in cases of impeachment – in the words of the May 3 Constitution of 1791 (article VIII: the judicial authority) – of government "ministers [...] charged with breach of law by a deputation designated to examine their deeds [...]." The composition and functioning of sejm courts were spelled out in an act of the Sejm passed on May 13, 1791.
