= Tatarinov =

Tatarinov (Russian: Татаринов) is a Russian surname. The feminine form is Tatarinova (Russian: Татаринова). Among those with this name are:

== Tatarinov ==
- Aleksandr Tatarinov (b. 1950), naval officer
- Alexander Tatarinov (b. 1982), ice hockey player
- Andrey Tatarinov (b. 1951), diplomat
- Andrey Yuryevich Tatarinov (b. 1988), politician, social activist and journalist
- Gennady Tatarinov (b. 1991), cyclist
- German Tatarinov (1925–2006), painter
- Kirill Tatarinov, businessman
- Leonid Petrovich Tatarinov (1926–2011), paleontologist and evolutionary biologist
- Mikhail Tatarinov (b. 1966), ice hockey player
- Nikolay Tatarinov (1927–2017), pentathetle, olympian
- Yevgeni Tatarinov (b. 1999), footballer

== Tatarinova ==
- Anna Tatarinova (b. 1978), footballer

== See also ==
- 17169 Tatarinov, a minor planet
