= List of permanent representatives of Latvia to NATO =

The Latvian Permanent Representative to NATO is the official representative of Latvia to the North Atlantic Treaty Organization. The Representative has the rank of full ambassador and is appointed by the President. The full official title of the Representative is Latvia Permanent Representative on the Council of the North Atlantic Treaty Organization, with the rank and status of Ambassador Extraordinary and Plenipotentiary. The current Latvian Ambassador to NATO is Edgars Skuja.

== List ==
Image	Ambassador	Dates served
	Aivis Ronis	2004–2005
	Jānis Eichmanis	2005–2010
	Māris Riekstiņš	2011–2015
	Indulis Bērziņš	2015–2019
	Edgars Skuja	2019–2023
	Māris Riekstiņš	since 2023
