= Barclay de Tolly Monument =

Monument in Tartu, Estonia

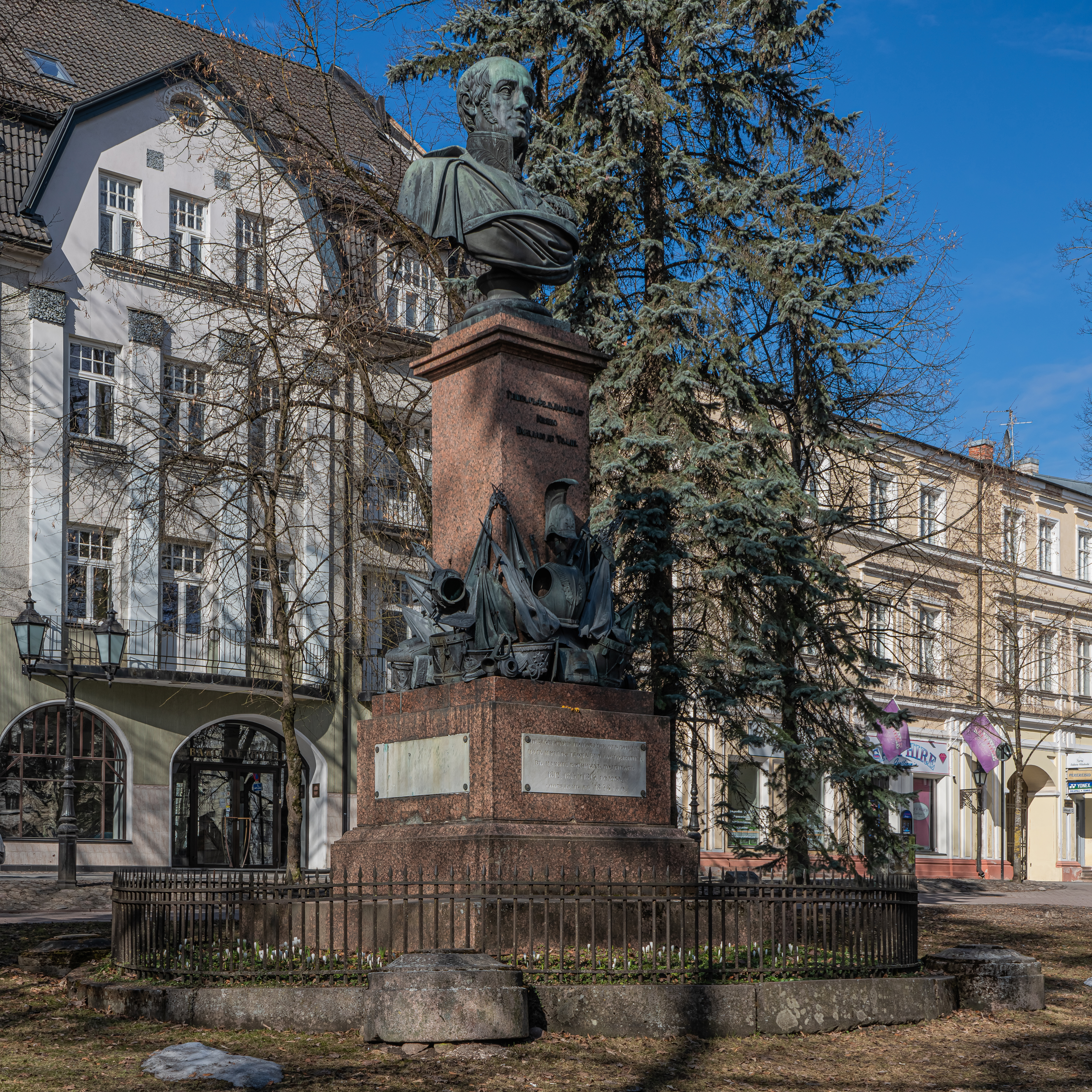
- Barclay de Tolly Monument
- 58°22′44″N 26°43′23″E
- Location: Tartu, Estonia

Barclay de Tolly Monument (Estonian: Barclay de Tolly monument) is a monument in Tartu, Estonia. The monument is erected in the honor of Baltic-German field marshal Michael Andreas Barclay de Tolly. The monument is listed as cultural heritage monument of Estonia.

The monument is designed by I. Demut–Malinovski and A. Stsedrin. The monument opened in 1849.
