= Andrey Yuryevich Tatarinov =

Russian politician

Andrey Yuryevich Tatarinov (Russian: Андре́й Ю́рьевич Тата́ринов, born 6 June 1988) is a Russian politician, social activist, journalist and the founder of the Center for Actual Policy, an autonomous nonprofit organization for research and development of civil society institutions. In 2010–2012, he was member of the Civic Chamber of the Russian Federation.

== Biography ==
Tatarinov was born on 6 June 1988 in Moscow. He graduated from the Russian State Social University with a degree in Public and Municipal Administration. Previously, he studied journalism at the Lomonosov Moscow State University and the Alexander Griboedov Institute of International Law and Economics.

He is married and has a son and a daughter.

Until 2006, he worked as a political journalist. From 2004 to 2005, he was a freelance correspondent of the "Society" section of the Izvestia, reporting on political events. In 2005, he completed an internship at Channel 3, working on the Russkiy vzglyad program. From 2005 to 2006, he was a columnist for the Zavtra newspaper, writing under the pseudonym Andrey Sadov.

Under this pseudonym, in 2004–2006, he was a member of a number of the National Bolshevik Party, and the youth wing of Yabloko.

Then he became the leader of the Youth Human Rights Movement "Leviy Povorot" (left turn) in the first action which he had burned NBP party ticket. On street protests he repeatedly has had detained by riot police.

From 2006 to 2010, Tatarinov was an active member and then one of the leaders of the Young Guard of United Russia. According to Tatarinov, in the spring of 2006, he was invited to join the Young Guard by Ivan Demidov, then its ideological coordinator. Tatarinov worked as a political technology expert at the central headquarters of the Young Guard. On 12 December 2006, at the Second Congress of the Young Guard, he became a member of its Political Council and was re-elected until 2010. He headed the political department of the central headquarters and worked on creating similar structures in regional branches. On 13 April 2010, in Grozny, at the first meeting of the coordinating council in the North Caucasus Federal District, he was elected as its official representative to the central headquarters of the Young Guard. In the autumn of 2010, before the Fourth Congress of the Young Guard, he was considered one of the leading candidates for the role of the organization's new leader. At the congress on 22 December, he was elected to the coordinating council. He called Anna Chapman, who had also become a member of the Public Council of the Young Guard, "an example of unconditional patriotism".

In 2007–2008, he was deputy head of the United Russia Federal Youth Electoral Headquarters, which worked in the legislative and presidential elections.

In 2008, after the Russia–Georgia war, he organized the information campaign "I am telling the truth about Tskhinvali".

In 2008–2009, he organized the Young Guard campaign "Our Money for Our People" against illegal immigration. The protest began after the Federal Migration Service (FMS) announced a planned increase in quotas for foreign labor in Russia. On 1 November 2008, Young Guard pickets were held outside the FMS building and the offices of several construction companies. Representatives of the Movement Against Illegal Immigration attempted to join the protest, but their presence was dismissed as a provocation. On 4 December, Vladimir Putin announced the need to halve the quota and, on 5 December, issued a corresponding order to the FMS. Tatarinov claimed this as a victory for the Young Guard. On 8 December, the picketing of the FMS resumed under the slogan "FMS, don't slow down!" On 18 December, International Migrants Day, the Young Guard held the sticker campaign "Every Second One - Go Home" and announced plans to conduct joint raids with the FMS. 19 January 2009, in Moscow at the Kazan station Young Guards met trains from Central Asia with posters "Work legally!" and "Illegal - the thief". The activists of Young Guard have been threw eggs and ink bubbles by activists of "Autonomous Action".

Tatarinov repeatedly opposed gay parades. In 2008, the portal gayrussia.eu led collection of his quotations, that are in the opinion of the editorial board, are homophobic.

In 2009–2010, Tatarinov organized the "My History" project with the slated aims of defending historical memory against historical revisionism. The first rally of the project took place on 22 June 2009, the Day of Remembrance and Sorrow in Moscow. Subsequently, numerous protests were held throughout the year at the embassies of Ukraine, Latvia, Estonia, and Poland.

On 17 November 2009, Tatarinov organized a protest against the demolition of the Tsoi Wall on Old Arbat Street, which was then planned by the Moscow Central Administrative Okrug Prefecture. After the action the city authorities refused his plan.

From 2010 to 2012, Tatarinov was a member of the Civic Chamber of the Russian Federation. He was a member of several committees: on the development of civil society (with the right to veto); on interethnic relations and freedom of conscience; on regional development and local self-government (in an advisory capacity). He was member of the inter-commission working group on childhood issues and youth policy.

Tatarinov was a member of the observer group during the second round of 2010 Ukrainian presidential election.

In February 2010, at a roundtable discussion of the Russian diaspora in Moldova in Chișinău dedicated to the problems of historical falsifications, he spoke out against the creation of a special commission to investigate and evaluate the crimes of the Soviet Union.

On 3 June 2010, he issued a statement condemning the position of Commissioner for Human Rights Vladimir Lukin, who announced the suspension of cooperation with the Ministry of Internal Affairs in connection with the arrests at the Strategy-31 rally on Triumfalnaya Square on 31 May 2010.

In July 2010, supported the idea of the return the course of Basic military training in Moscow schools: "In our country, every young person should be able to keep guns in their hands and shoot straight out of it".

On 1 November 2010, Tatarinov was arrested for participating in an unauthorized protest at the Embassy of Japan in Moscow against Tokyo's response to Russian President Dmitry Medvedev's visit to the Kuril Islands.

On 8 November 2010, Tatarinov made a public appeal not to associate the Young Guard with the attack on Oleg Kashin on 6 November: "Our political discussion should not be presented as a pretext for criminal activity. We wish Oleg a speedy recovery and return to duty." A day later, at an extraordinary joint meeting of the three relevant commissions of the Civic Chamber, Yevgenia Albats attributed the attack to "an atmosphere of intolerance in society created by pro-Kremlin youth organizations" and demanded the resignation of Federal Agency for Youth Affairs head Vasily Yakemenko; Tatarinov accused her of exploiting the situation to advance her political goals.

In January 2011, Tatarinov became a signatory of the manifesto establishing the Lev Gumilev Center along with other public figures, such as philosopher Alexander Sekatsky, publicist Avraam Shmulevich, and writer Roman Bagdasarov.

In September 2011, Tatarinov called for the arrest of writer Eduard Bagirov in Chișinău on charges of organizing the 2009 Moldova civil unrest.

On the eve of the opposition rally on 10 December 2011 on Bolotnaya Square in Moscow, Novaya Gazeta, citing "informed activist sources", named Tatarinov among those preparing provocations on the part of the Young Guard, specifically "shouting slogans in support of Putin and the current government, unfurling corresponding posters and tricolor flags." Tatarinov denied the accusations: "I have long since retired from working for the Young Guard of United Russia and am now working in the Civic Chamber."

During the 2012 Russian presidential election, Tatarinov served as the executive secretary of the Coordinating Council of the Headquarters of United Actions, organized in support of Vladimir Putin by the movements Mestnye, Young Russia, New People, and others. The Headquarters of United Actions announced a white glove as its symbol. On 7 February, Tatarinov addressed an open letter to Ksenia Sobchak, stating that "the people on the stage of the so-called 'Bolotnaya' protest have nothing in common with the values associated with your family's name." On the night after the election, the Headquarters held a rally on Lubyanka Square. On the morning of 20 February, the filing of the notice for the rally led to clashes with opposition representatives outside Moscow City Hall has been accompanied by clashes with opposition representatives outside the Moscow Mayor's Office.

In 2013, he was a columnist of the newspaper Moskovskiye Novosti and the online newspaper Vzglyad.

Since December 2013, he has been working in the media as the director of the Center for Actual Policy.
