= Chief of Staff to the Prime Minister (Latvia) =

Official political post of Latvia

Chief of Staff to the Prime Minister (Latvian: Latvijas Republikas Ministru prezidenta biroja vadītājs) is appointed by the Prime Minister of Latvia.

== List ==
Prime Minister	Chief of Staff	Dates served
Einars Repše		
Indulis Emsis	Viesturs Silenieks	
Aigars Kalvītis	Jurģis Liepnieks	2006–2007
Aigars Kalvītis	Māris Riekstiņš	January, 2007 – November, 2007
Ivars Godmanis	Juris Radzēvičs	– March 12, 2009
Valdis Dombrosvskis	Olita Augustovska	– November 3, 2010
Laimdota Straujuma	Ringolds Arnītis	– November 6, 2014 – February 11, 2016
Māris Kučinskis	Māris Krastiņš	February 11, 2016 – January 23, 2019
Krišjānis Kariņš	Jānis Patmalnieks	January 24, 2019 – present
