= Mestnye =

Russian ecological movement

Movement of Young Political Ecologists «Mestnye» Движение молодых политических экологов «Местные»
- Leader: Tatyana Dmitrieva
- Founded: 19 October 2005; 19 years ago
- Headquarters: 2nd Building, Ilyinskoe Highway, Krasnogorsk, Moscow Oblast, Russia. 143400
- Ideology: Environmentalism; Russian nationalism Eco-nationalism; Russian conservatism Anti-immigration; Regionalism; Neo-Nazism
- Political position: Right-wing
- National affiliation: Young Russia
- Colours: Green

Website
- mestnie.ru

Mestnye (Russian: Местные, romanized: Mestnyye) ("The Locals") is a Russian political movement of young ecologists that was formed on October 19, 2005. Its full description in Russian is Движение молодых политических экологов "Местные" (English: Dvizheniye molodykh politicheskikh ekologov "Mestnyye"). The Locals are a Kremlin project created to oversee independent ecological movements such as the Baikal Movement and Green Russia.

== Overview ==
The movement's leader is Tatiana Romanovna Dmitrieva, although The Locals were created and supervised by the administration of Andrey Vorobyov, Governor of Moscow Oblast.

The Mestnye focus on the environment, anti-crisis, and its role as a national program.

Its leaders have said the movement is concerned with "ecology with a political bias". At one of the rallies, one of the leaders of the Mestnye, Igor Panin, said: "A lot of all sorts of rubbish appeared in the suburbs. Visitors should understand that there is no need to shit here! It must be clean! Because we are local! Russia will win!"

== Activities ==
From June 20 to June 28, 2007, the Mestnye movement held an action called "Let's not let migrants drive", which called on the population not to use the services of private cabs driven by illegal migrants. In connection with the action, a member of the Federation Council of Russia Vladimir Sloutsker said he was preparing an appeal to the General Prosecutor's Office of Russia with a request to verify the fact of extremism. According to Sloutsker, "The leaflet circulated today depicting a Slavic girl refusing the services of a driver with a pronounced Caucasian appearance cannot be interpreted otherwise than as a violation of Article 282 of the Criminal Code incitement to hatred or enmity, as well as humiliation of human dignity and federal law on countering extremist activities".

On February 21, 2009, Mestnye held a rally in Moscow in defense of the Russian language. The leader of the organization stated: "We are tired of the fact that through the mass media - television and radio, the Internet, any creature can carry obscenities, criminal vocabulary, and the moronic language of sexual and other minorities into our homes. We want our country to speak our pure Russian language."

Since July 2009, it has held its annual summer youth educational camp "OKA" in Moscow Oblast. The camp is located at the eastern outskirts of the Dankovsky settlement of the Serpukhovsky District in the town Pyanyi Bogor, near the village Priluki on the banks of the Oka River.

On November 10, 2010, the group held an action against Ģirts Valdis Kristovskis in front of the Embassy of Latvia in Moscow.
