= Michael Andreas Barclay de Tolly =

Russian general (1761–1818)

Field Marshal His Serene Highness Prince Michael Andreas Barclay de Tolly
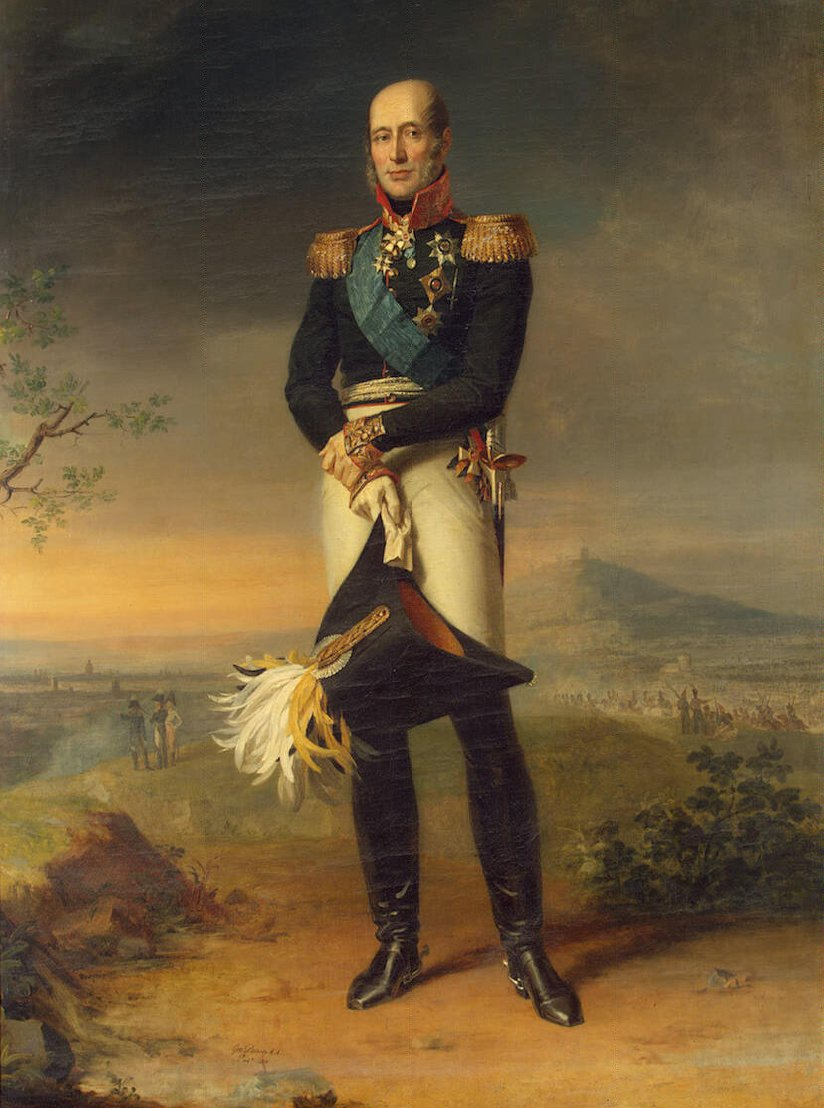
- Portrait by George Dawe, 1829

Minister of Land Forces
- In office 20 January 1810 – 24 August 1812
- Monarch: Alexander I
- Preceded by: Aleksey Arakcheyev
- Succeeded by: Aleksey Gorchakov
Other offices held
Governor-General of Finland
In office 1809–1810
Monarch	Alexander I
Preceded by	Georg Magnus Sprengtporten
Succeeded by	Fabian Steinheil

Personal details
- Born: December 1761 Pamūšis, Polish–Lithuanian Commonwealth
- Died: 24 September [O.S. 12 September] 1818 (aged 56) Insterburg, Kingdom of Prussia
- Resting place: Beckhof
- Spouse: Auguste Helena Eleonora (m. 1791)
- Children: Magnus Barclay de Tolly
- Known for: Implementing the scorched earth strategy in the course of the French invasion of Russia
- Awards: See § Awards and decorations

Military service
- Allegiance: Russia
- Branch/service: Imperial Russian Army
- Years of service: 1776–1818
- Rank: Field marshal
- Commands: • Imperial Russian forces in the Finnish War; • First Western Army; • Imperial Russian Army in the Hundred Days
- Battles/wars: See battles: Russo-Turkish War (1787–1792); Siege of Ochakov; Russo-Swedish War (1788–1790); Battle of Partakoski; Kościuszko Uprising; Capture of Vilnius; Battle of Praga; Finnish War; Crossing the Gulf of Bothnia; Napoleonic Wars; Battle of Czarnowo; Battle of Pułtusk; Battle of Hof (1807); Battle of Eylau (WIA); Battle of Vitebsk; Battle of Smolensk; Battle of Valutino; Battle of Borodino; Battle of Königswartha; Battle of Bautzen; Battle of Dresden; Battle of Kulm; Battle of Leipzig; Battle of La Rothière; Battle of Arcis-sur-Aube; Battle of Fère-Champenoise; Battle of Paris

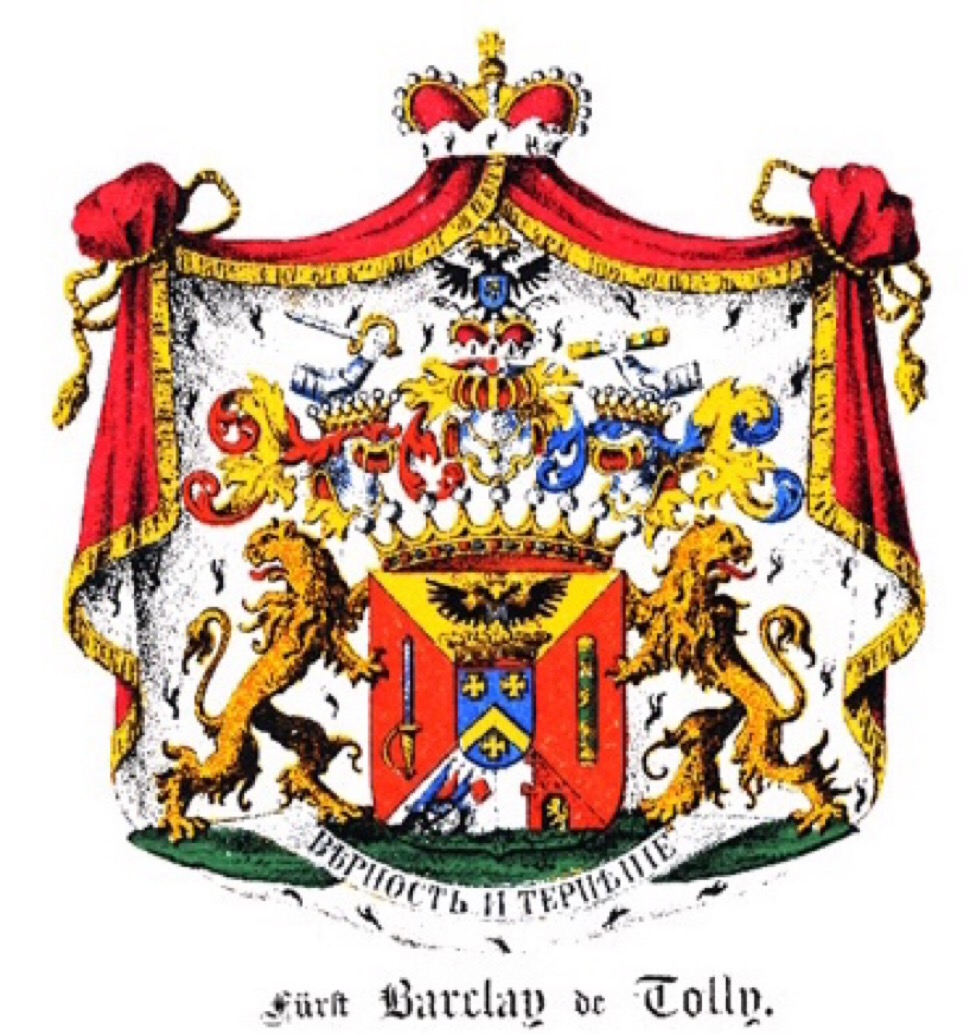
Coat of arms of the princely Barclay de Tolly family of 1815, in the Baltic Coat of arms book by Carl Arvid von Klingspor in 1882

Prince Michael Andreas Barclay de Tolly (Note: Also known as Mikhail Bogdanovich Barclay de Tolly; Russian: Михаил Богданович Барклай де Толли, romanized: Mikhail Bogdanovich Barklay de Tolli; alternatively Барклай-де-Толли; German: Michael Andreas Barclay de Tolly.) (baptised 27 December [O.S. 16 December] 1761 – 26 May [O.S. 14 May] 1818) was a Russian field marshal who figured prominently in the Napoleonic Wars.

Barclay was born into a Baltic German family from Livland. His father was the first of his family to be accepted into the Russian nobility. In Russian service he was known as Mikhail Bogdanovich. Barclay joined the Imperial Russian Army at a young age in 1776. He served with distinction in the Russo-Turkish War (1787–92), the Russo-Swedish War (1788–1790), and the Kościuszko Uprising (1794).

In 1806, Barclay began commanding in the Napoleonic Wars, distinguishing himself at the Battle of Pułtusk that same year. He was wounded at the Battle of Eylau in 1807 while his troops were covering the retreat of the Russian army. Because of his wounds, he was forced to leave command. The following year, he carried out successful operations in the Finnish War against Sweden. Barclay led 3,500 troops approximately 100 km (62 mi) across the frozen Gulf of Bothnia in winter during a snowstorm. For his accomplishments, Barclay de Tolly was made a General of the Infantry and appointed Governor-General of the Grand Duchy of Finland. From 20 January 1810 to 24 August 1812 he was the Minister of War of the Russian Empire.

When the French invasion of Russia began in 1812, Barclay de Tolly was commander of the 1st Army of the West, the largest Army to face Napoleon. Barclay initiated a scorched earth policy from the beginning of the campaign, though this made him unpopular among Russians. On the eve of the invasion, he also carried out military reforms. After the Battle of Smolensk failed to halt the French and discontent among Russians continued to grow, Alexander I appointed Mikhail Kutuzov as Commander-in-Chief, though Barclay remained in charge of the 1st Army. However, Kutuzov continued the same scorched earth retreat up to Moscow where the Battle of Borodino took place nearby. Barclay commanded the right wing and center of the Russian army for the battle. After Napoleon's retreat, the eventual success of Barclay's tactics made him a hero among Russians. He became Commander-in-Chief in 1813 after the Battle of Bautzen, replacing Wittgenstein (who had been appointed after Kutuzov's death early in 1813) and led the taking of Paris, for which he was made a Field Marshal. His health later declined and he died on a visit to Germany in 1818.

== Early life and family ==
Michael Andreas was born to Gotthard Barclay de Tolly (1734–1781) and his wife Margarethe Elisabeth von Smitten (1733–1771). The Barclay de Tolly family were German-speaking descendants of the Scottish Clan Barclay. Their ancestor, Peter Barclay, belonged to the Towie or Tolly branch of the family and settled in Rostock in 1621; his son later moved to Riga in Livonia. Michael Andreas was born in Pamūšis in the Polish–Lithuanian Commonwealth and raised in Beckhof, Livonia, which was his mother's family estate. The commonly accepted birth date of 27 December 1761 is actually the day of his baptism in the Lutheran church of the town of Zaumel.

Michael Andreas's grandfather, Wilhelm Barclay de Tolly, served as the mayor of Riga, while his father served in the Russian army before being admitted into the ranks of the Russian nobility by the Tsar. From 1765, the young Barclay de Tolly grew up in St. Petersburg and was raised by his aunt. This was a common occurrence among the German Protestants, and it gave the young man an exposure to higher society unavailable in the Baltic provinces.

The future field marshal started his active service in the Imperial Russian Army in 1776, and he would spend the rest of his life with the military. He had two brothers who also served in the Russian army: Axel Heinrich Barclay de Tolly, a Major General of Engineers, and Erich Johann Barclay de Tolly, a Major of Artillery.

== Service history ==
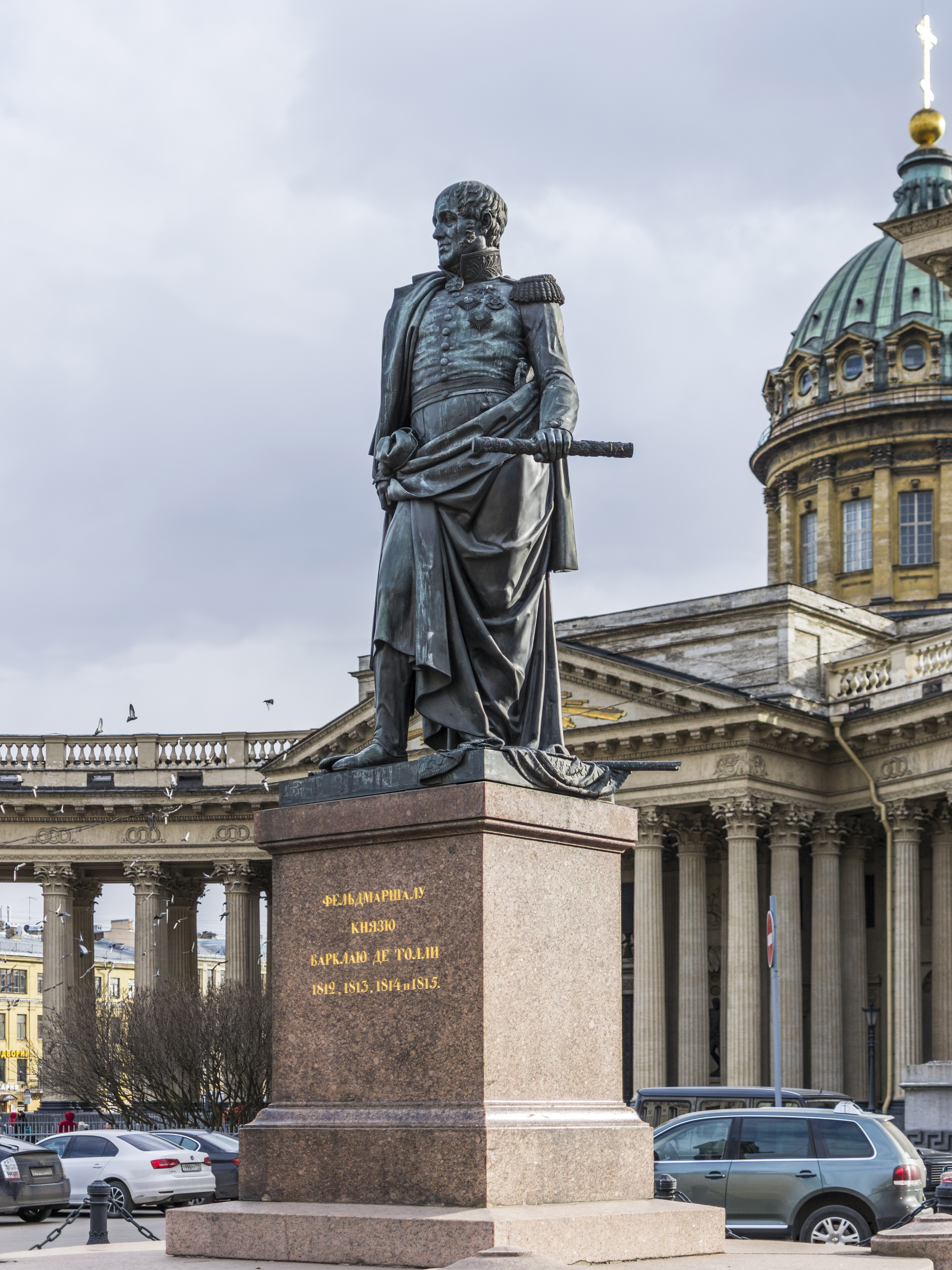
Statue of Barclay de Tolly in front of the Kazan Cathedral in St Petersburg, by Boris Orlovsky

Barclay was enlisted in the Pskov Carabineer Regiment on 13 May 1776, and he achieved the rank of a cornet by May 1778. In the same year, he joined the Imperial jaeger regiments, and with his unit was assigned to the army of Prince Potemkin. In 1788–1789, during the Russo-Turkish War (1787–92), Barclay served under the command of Victor Amadeus of Anhalt-Bernburg-Schaumburg-Hoym. During this campaign, he distinguished himself in the taking of Ochakov and Akkerman. For his role in the capture of Ochakov, he was personally decorated by Prince Potemkin.

In 1789, during the Russo-Swedish War, he was transferred to the Finnish front. He fought at Partakoski in 1790, where he received the mortally wounded Victor Amadeus' sword. Four years later, he fought in the Polish Campaign of 1794, and was decorated for his role in the capture of Vilnius. He was a lieutenant colonel by 1794 after serving as aide-de-camp to various senior officers in several campaigns. In that year, he was appointed commander of the Estland Jaeger Corps, and three years later commander of the 4th Jaeger Regiment, becoming its chief in 1799, soon after being promoted to general major for his service in Poland.

In the war of 1806 against Napoleon, Barclay took a distinguished part in the Battle of Pultusk (December 1806) and was wounded at the Battle of Eylau (7 February 1807), where his conduct won him promotion to the rank of lieutenant general. After a period of convalescence, Barclay returned to the army and in 1808 commanded operations against the Swedes during the Finnish War. In 1809, he successfully marched over the frozen Gulf of Bothnia, which allowed him to surprise the enemy and seize Umeå in Sweden. For this exploit, immortalized by the Russian poet Baratynsky, he was made full general, namely a general of the infantry, and Governor-General of Finland. A year later, he became Minister of War, retaining the post until 1813.

== Napoleon's invasion ==
During Napoleon's invasion of Russia in 1812, Barclay assumed the supreme command of the 1st Army of the West, the largest of the Russian armies facing Napoleon. He used a strategy of retreat leaving behind scorched earth from the beginning of the campaign in order to draw the French supply lines deep into Russian territory and retreated to the village of Tsaryovo-Zaimishche between Moscow and Smolensk, although some consider the strategy merely a confluence of diverse circumstances and not attributable to the will of one man.

Nevertheless, the Russians keenly opposed the appointment of a non-Russian as commander-in-chief. His rivals spread rumors of his being Napoleon's agent, and the populace condemned him as a coward. Barclay was forced by his subordinates and the Tsar to engage Napoleon at Smolensk (17–18 August 1812). Napoleon forced Barclay to retreat when he threatened Barclay's only escape route. After the loss of the "Holy City" of Smolensk, the outcry of officers and civilians grew to a point where the Tsar could no longer ignore it. He appointed Kutuzov, previously a general at the battle of Austerlitz, as the over-all commander of the Russian forces. Barclay remained General of the 1st Army of the West.

Barclay commanded the right flank at the Battle of Borodino (7 September 1812) with great valour and presence of mind, and during the celebrated council at Fili advised Kutuzov to surrender unfortified Moscow to the enemy. His illness made itself known at that time and he was forced to leave the army soon afterwards.

After Napoleon was driven from Russia, the eventual success of Barclay's tactics made him a romantic hero, misunderstood by his contemporaries and rejected by the court. His popularity soared, and his honour was restored by the tsar.

== Conquest of France ==
Barclay was re-employed in the field and took part in the German Campaign of 1813 and the French Campaign of 1814, which ended the War of the Sixth Coalition (1812–1814).

After Kutuzov's death, he once again became commander-in-chief of the Russian forces at the Battle of Bautzen (21 May 1813), and in this capacity he served at Dresden (26–27 August 1813), Kulm (29–30 August 1813) and Leipzig (16–19 October 1813). In the latter battle, he commanded a central part of the Allied forces so effectively that the tsar bestowed upon him the title of count.

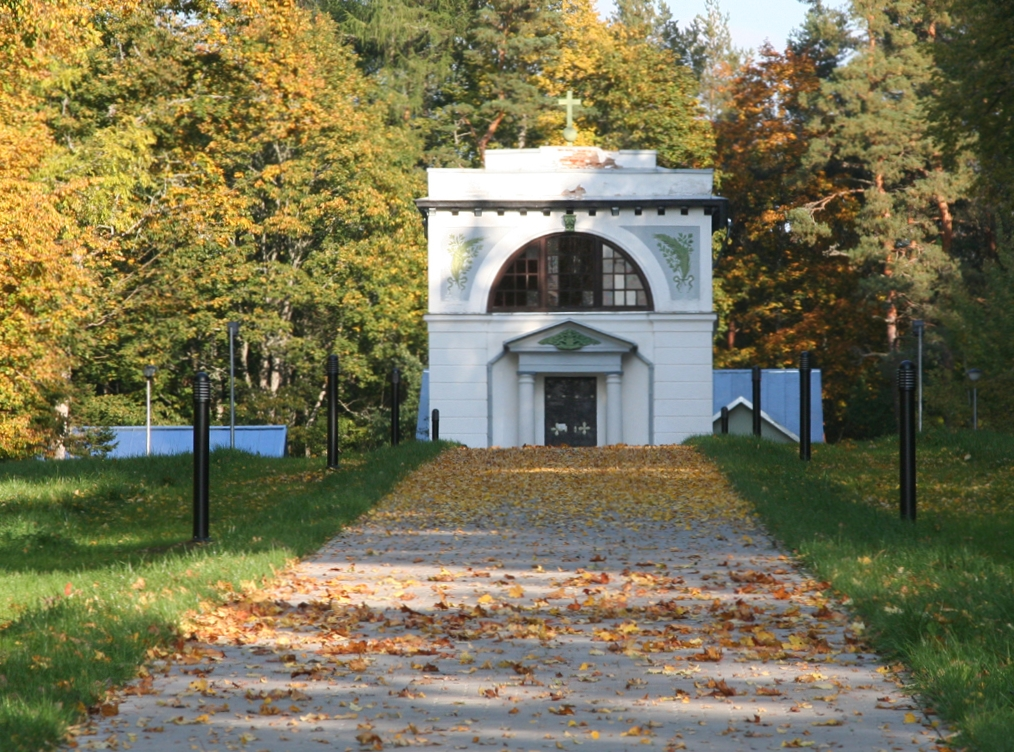
Barclay de Tolly Mausoleum in Jõgeveste, southern Estonia

Barclay took part in the invasion of France in 1814 and commanded the taking of Paris, receiving the baton of a Field Marshal in reward. In 1815 he again served as commander-in-chief of the Russian army, which after the Hundred Days occupied France, and he was made a prince at the close of the war. As his health grew worse, he left the military and settled down in his Jõgeveste manor (German exonym: Beckhof, Polish: Tepelshof) (in what is now southern Estonia).

== Legacy ==
Barclay de Tolly died at Insterburg (Chernyakhovsk), East Prussia, on 26 May 1818 (14 May, Old Style) on his way from his Livonian manor to Germany, where he wanted to renew his health. His and his wife Helene Auguste Eleonore von Smitten's remains were embalmed and put into the mausoleum built to a design by Apollon Shchedrin and Vasily Demut-Malinovsky in 1832 in Jõgeveste.

In Russian cultural memory, Barclay de Tolly's historical reputation was significantly rehabilitated by the poet Alexander Pushkin. In his 1835 poem The Commander (Polkovodets), Pushkin vindicated Barclay's controversial "scorched-earth" strategic retreat during the 1812 French invasion. Written after Pushkin viewed George Dawe's portrait of the general in the Military Gallery of the Winter Palace, the poem defended Barclay against contemporary public hostility and xenophobia, portraying him as a tragic, misunderstood hero whose strategy ultimately saved the Russian Empire. Lines from Pushkin's poem are inscribed on the monument dedicated to Barclay de Tolly in Chernyakhovsk.

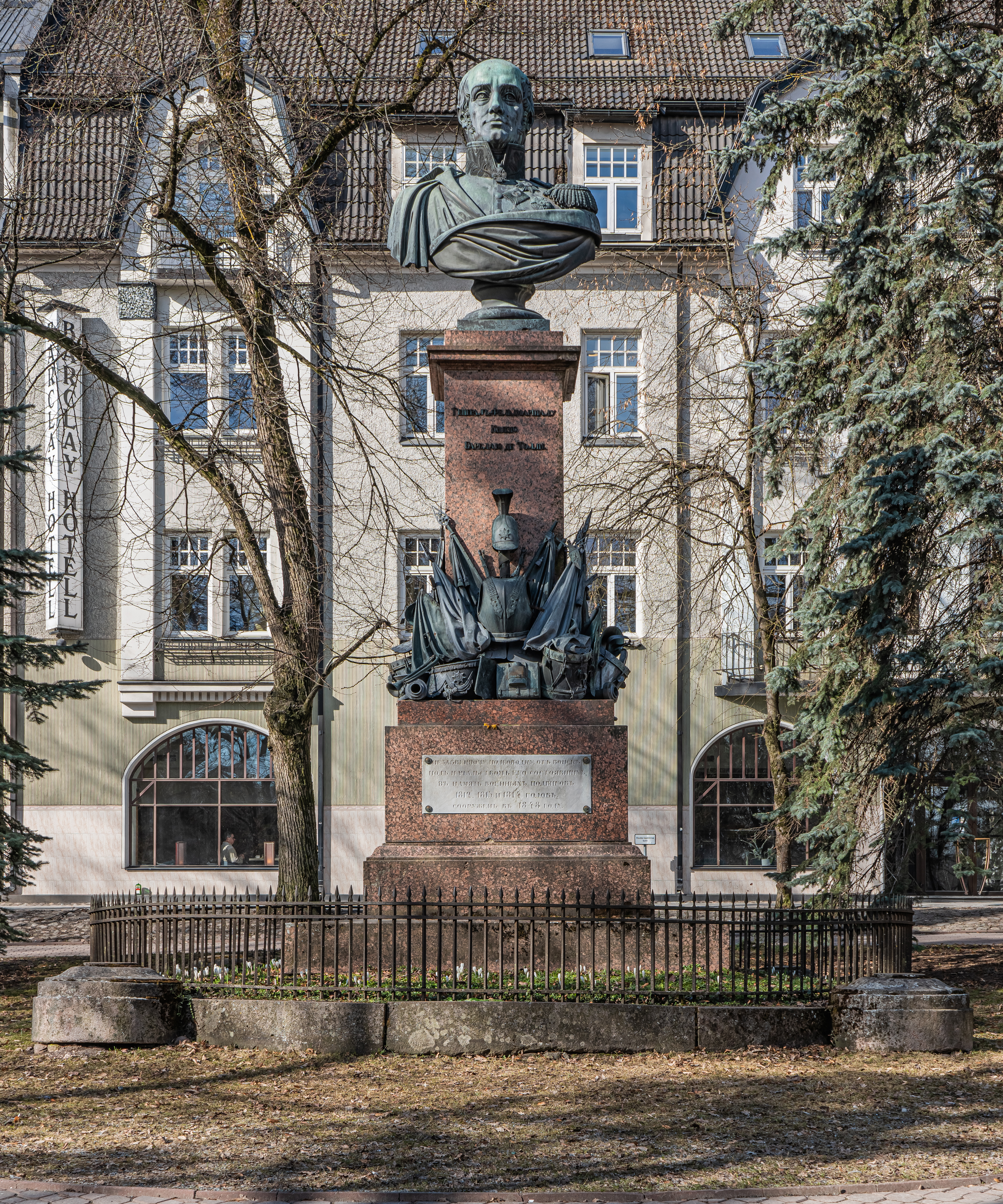
Bust of Barclay de Tolly in Tartu, Estonia

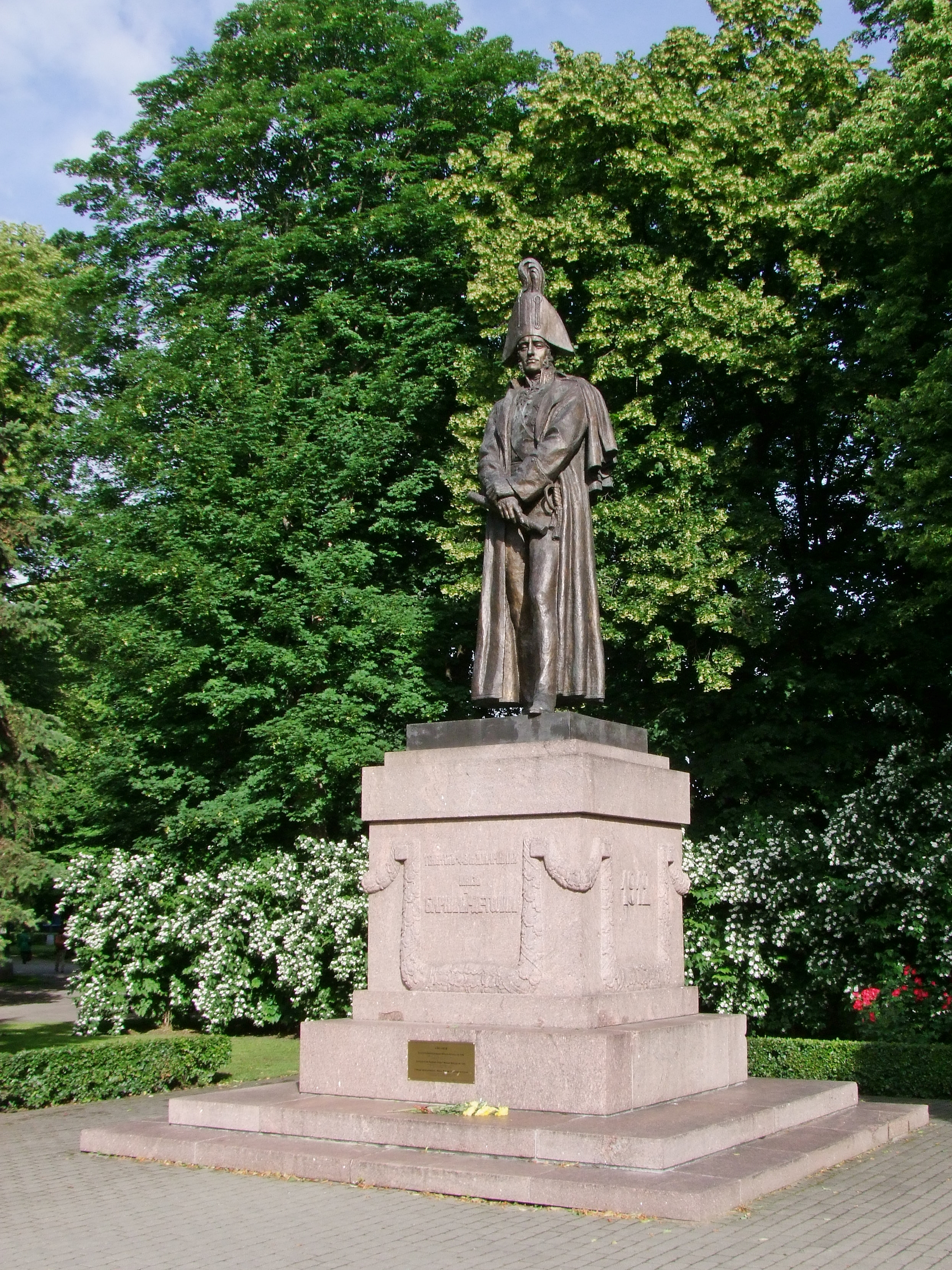
Memorial of Michael Barclay de Tolly in Riga, Latvia (photographed in June 2014)

A grand statue of him was erected in front of Kazan Cathedral, St Petersburg at the behest of Emperor Nicholas I. A full-size bronze-mounted statue by Vladimir Surovtsev in Chernyakhovsk, a bust monument in Tartu, and the so-called "Barclay's leaning house" in Tartu (which was acquired by his widow after his death). He was also commemorated by a modern statue in Riga, until it was subsequently dismantled on 16 October 2024. (Note: On 6 December 2024 the Russian Ministry of Foreign Affairs told the Latvian Embassy in Moscow that the dismantling of 16 October 2024 was part of "aforementioned criminal actions of Latvian Russophobes are extremely immoral and unacceptable in the civilised society" and was the "next wave of destruction of Russia's historical and cultural heritage.")

== Personal life and family ==
In 1791, Michael married his cousin, Auguste Helena Eleonora von Smitten (1770–1828), daughter of Hinrich Johann von Smitten (1731–1782) and Renata Helena von Stackelberg (1749–1786). After the extinction of the Barclay de Tolly princely line with his son Magnus on 29 October 1871 (17 October, Old Style), Alexander II allowed the field marshal's sister's grandson through female lineage, Alexander von Weymarn, to assume the title of Prince Barclay de Tolly-Weymarn on 12 June 1872 (31 May, Old Style).

== Awards and decorations ==
- Russian Empire:
  - Order of St. Andrew (7 September 1813)
  - Order of St. George – Barclay de Tolly was the second of four full Knights of St. George in the history of the Order. This includes his contemporary, Kutuzov
    - 1st class (19 August 1813, no. 11) – "For the defeat of the French at the Battle of Kulm 18 August 1813"
    - 2nd class Grand Cross (21 October 1812, no. 44) – "For his part in the Battle of Borodino on 26 August 1812"
    - 3rd class (8 January 1807, no. 139) – "In the great reward of bravery and courage, rendered in the battle against the French troops on December 14th at Pultusk, where he commanded the vanguard ahead pravago flank, with a special skill and prudence kept the enemy at all times of battle and overturned Nadezhda"
    - 4th class (16 September 1794, no. 547) – "For outstanding courage, rendered against the Polish insurgents in the capture of the fortifications and town of Vilna"
  - Gold Sword for Bravery with diamonds and laurels with the inscription" for 20 January 1814" (1814)
  - Order of St. Vladimir, 1st class (15 September 1811), 2nd class (7 March 1807), 4th class (12 July 1788)
  - Order of St. Alexander Nevsky (9 September 1809); diamonds added (9 May 1813)
  - Order of St. Anna, 1st class (7 March 1807)
  - Golden Cross for taking Ochakov (7 December 1788)
  - Cross "For the victory of Eylau" (1807)
- Kingdom of Prussia:
  - Order of the Red Eagle (1807)
  - Order of the Black Eagle (1813)
- Austrian Empire:
  - Commander of the Military Order of Maria Theresa (1813)
- Kingdom of Sweden:
  - Order of the Sword, 1st class (1814)
- Kingdom of France:
  - Grand Cross of the Legion of Honour (1815)
  - Order of Saint Louis, 1st class (1816)
- United Kingdom of Great Britain and Ireland:
  - Honorary Knight Grand Cross of the Order of the Bath (1815)
  - Sword with diamonds (1816)
- United Kingdom of the Netherlands:
  - Military William Order, 1st class (1815)
- Kingdom of Saxony:
  - Military Order of St. Henry, 1st class (1815)

== Commemoration ==
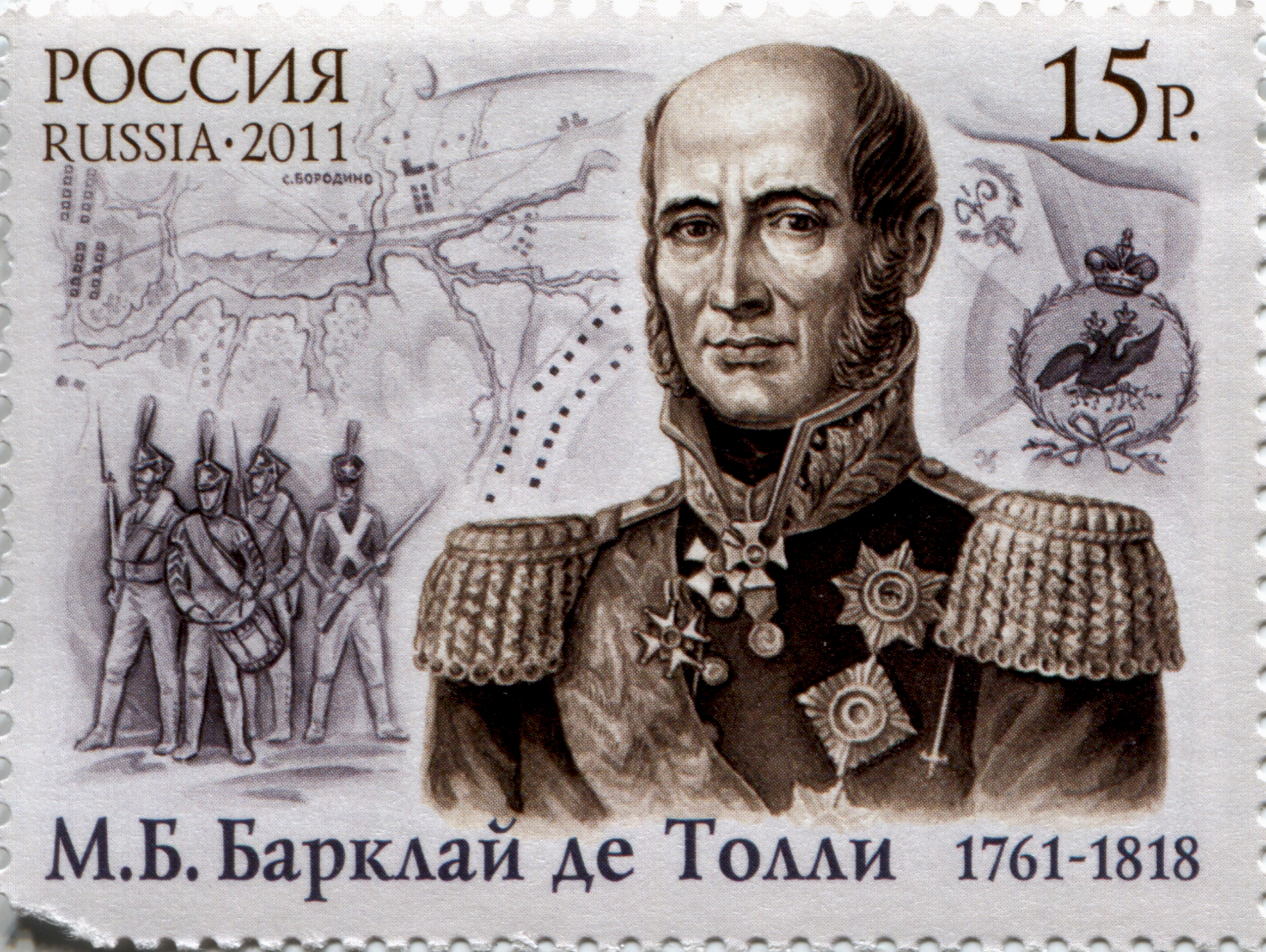
Michael Andreas Barclay de Tolly. Russia postage stamp, 2011

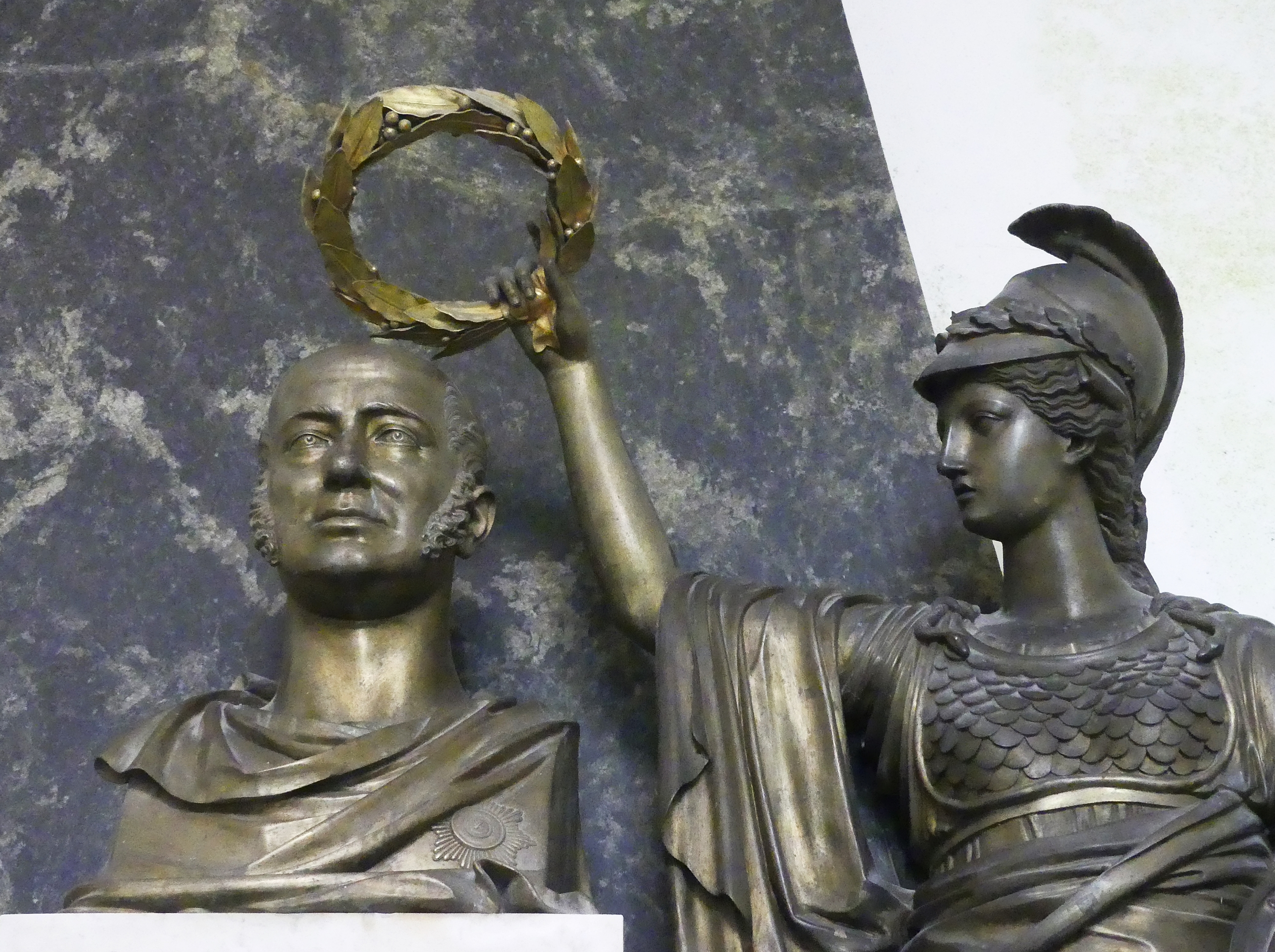
Athena, Goddess of Warfare, crowning Field Marshal Prince Michael Andreas Barclay de Tolly. Monument inside the mausoleum built in Jõgeveste.

- The Nesvizh 4th Grenadier Regiment (the General-Fieldmarshal Prince Barclay de Tolly, Mikhail Bogdanovich's) was named for the prince in 1880s.
- He was also the namesake of a short-lived Russian fortress in the Hawaiian Islands.
- A statue of Barclay de Tolly was erected in 2001 in the Esplanade gardens in Riga, evoking an earlier 1913 monument that was melted down for military use during World War I.
- Whereas his lineage as a Baltic-Scottish baron (and as such: non-Russian) had caused him to be derided by Russian historians in the late 19th and throughout the 20th century in favor of Kutuzov, his image as a leader has undergone a positive reassessment in recent years.
- The main-belt asteroid 4524 Barklajdetolli, discovered by Lyudmila Zhuravleva in 1981, was named in his honor.
- In the West Siberian river shipping company MRF RSFSR (Barnaul) operated steam tug Barclay.
- "Barclay de Tolly" was the name given in 1820 to Raroia island in the Tuamotus, French Polynesia.

In 2013, JSC Aeroflot-Russian Airlines received the Boeing 777-300ER aircraft manufactured by the Boeing Corporation, named in honor of the outstanding Russian military leader - M. Barclay de Tolly.

== Sources ==
- Bezotosny, V. M. (2016). "БАРКЛАЙ ДЕ ТОЛЛИ". Great Russian Encyclopedia. Electronic version.
- Fremont-Barnes, Gregory; Fisher, Todd (2004). The Napoleonic Wars: The Rise and Fall of an Empire. Fisher. ISBN 978-1841768311.
- Nafziger, George F. (2001). Historical Dictionary of the Napoleonic Era. Scarecrow Press. ISBN 978-0810866171.
- Josselson, Michael; Josselson, Diana (1980). The Commander: A Life of Barclay de Tolly. Oxford: Oxford University Press. ISBN 978-0-19-215854-3.
- Chisholm, Hugh, ed. (1911). "Barclay de Tolly, Michael Andreas" . Encyclopædia Britannica (11th ed.). Cambridge University Press.

Political offices
Preceded by Georg Magnus Sprengtporten	Governor-General of Finland; 1809–1810	Succeeded by Fabian Steinheil
Government offices
Preceded by Aleksey Arakcheyev	Minister of Land Forces of Russia; 1810–1812	Succeeded by Aleksey Gorchakov
