= Crossing the Gulf of Bothnia =

1809 event during the Finnish War

Crossing Kvarken
- Part of the Finnish War
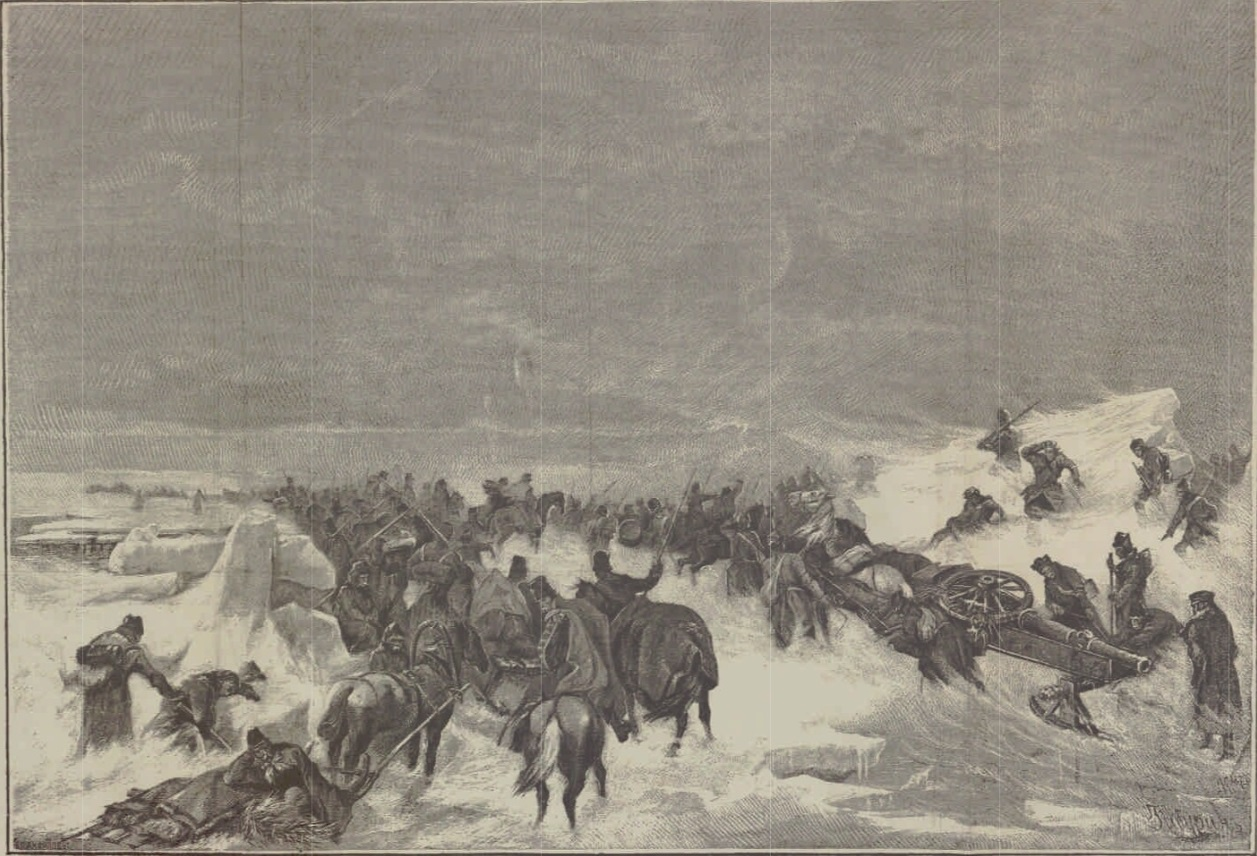
- Crossing Kvarken
Date	20–22 March 1809
Location	Kvarken, Gulf of Bothnia
Result	Russian victory
Territorial changes	The Swedes evacuated Västerbotten

Belligerents
Sweden	Russian Empire

Commanders and leaders
Georg Carl von Döbeln	(Russian Empire) Michael Andreas Barclay de Tolly

Strength
1,000 (Note: including only the Umeå garrison)	3,000

Casualties and losses
400 captured	~200 (Note: Most of them are frostbitten. A few wounded from combat losses)

Crossing the Gulf of Bothnia, specifically Kvarken (Russian: Переход через Кваркен) involved a Russian march through Kvarken, Gulf of Bothnia, to the territory of Sweden at Umeå. This occurred during the Finnish War in March 1809.

== Background ==
For the whole winter, the operation was in preparation. In the middle of February 1809 followed the appointment of Lieutenant General Michael Andreas Barclay de Tolly as commander of the Vasa Corps, who pushed forward preparations for the campaign. On March 18 [O.S. March 6] 1809 an order was read at the assembly point, in which Barclay, without concealing the labours to come, expressed his confidence that "for Russian soldiers the impossible does not exist."

== Hike ==
The march began on March 20 [O.S. March 8], and, according to its idea, was a unique event in world history. In the cold −15 °C (5.00000 °F), the Russians were walking across the icy desert towards Umeå. In front of the Swedish coast, they burned two merchant ships to keep warm. The troops had to abandon their artillery halfway due to the inability to quickly transfer it across the ice. They were opposed by a detachment in Umeå numbering no more than 1,000 people. Seeing the numerical superiority of the Russians, the Swedes tried to let go, but their rearguard units were overtaken and defeated, for example, a column under the command of Pavel Filisov engaged 3 companies of Swedes and forced them to retreat, taking 36 prisoners including 1 officer. On March 22 [O.S. March 10], Barclay de Tolly entered Umeå. The Swedish troops there surrendered and promised to surrender all Västerbotten.

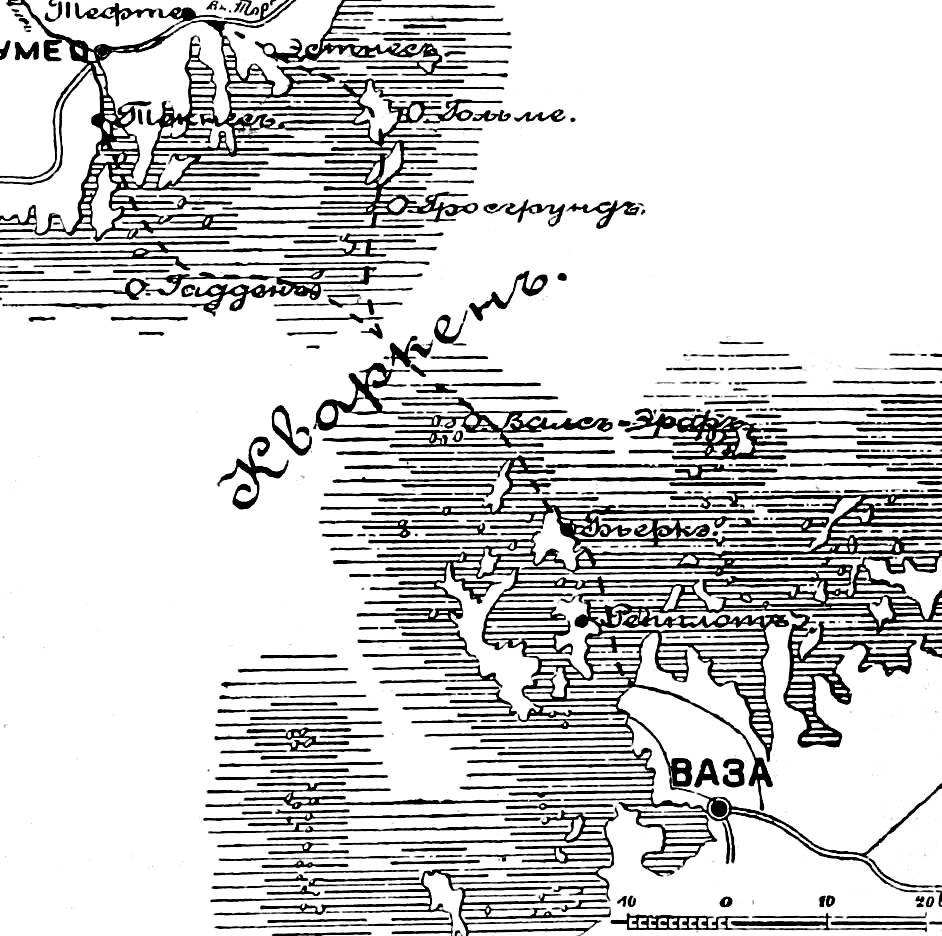
Map to the article "Kvarken". Sytin Military Encyclopedia (St. Petersburg, 1911–1915)

== Memory ==
Alexander I personally presented individual unique awards to each participant of the campaign.

== Sources ==
- Shkvarov, Alexei (2012). Россия и Швеция. История военных конфликтов 1142-1809 [Russia and Sweden. The history of military conflicts 1142-1809] (in Russian). Saint-Petersburg: RME Group Oy:Алетейя. ISBN 978-5-91419-754-1.
- Nive, Pyotr (1910). Русско-шведская война 1808—09 г.г. (in Russian). St. Petersburg: Военная Типография.
- Egorshina, O.; Petrova, A. (2023). История русской армии [The history of the Russian Army] (in Russian). Moscow: Edition of the Russian Imperial Library. ISBN 978-5-699-42397-2.
- Velichko, Konstantin; Novitsky, Vasily; Schwartz, Alexey von; Apushkin, Vladimir; Schoultz, Gustav von (1913). "КВАРКЕНЪ" [Kvarken]. Sytin Military Encyclopedia (in Russian). Vol. 12: Кальяри – Коалиционные войны. Типография Т-ва И. Д. Сытина. pp. 477–479.
- Barclay, Charles (1933). A history of the Barclay family, with full pedigrees from 1066 to 1933.
