= Azerbaijan–Latvia relations =

Bilateral relations between Azerbaijan and Latvia

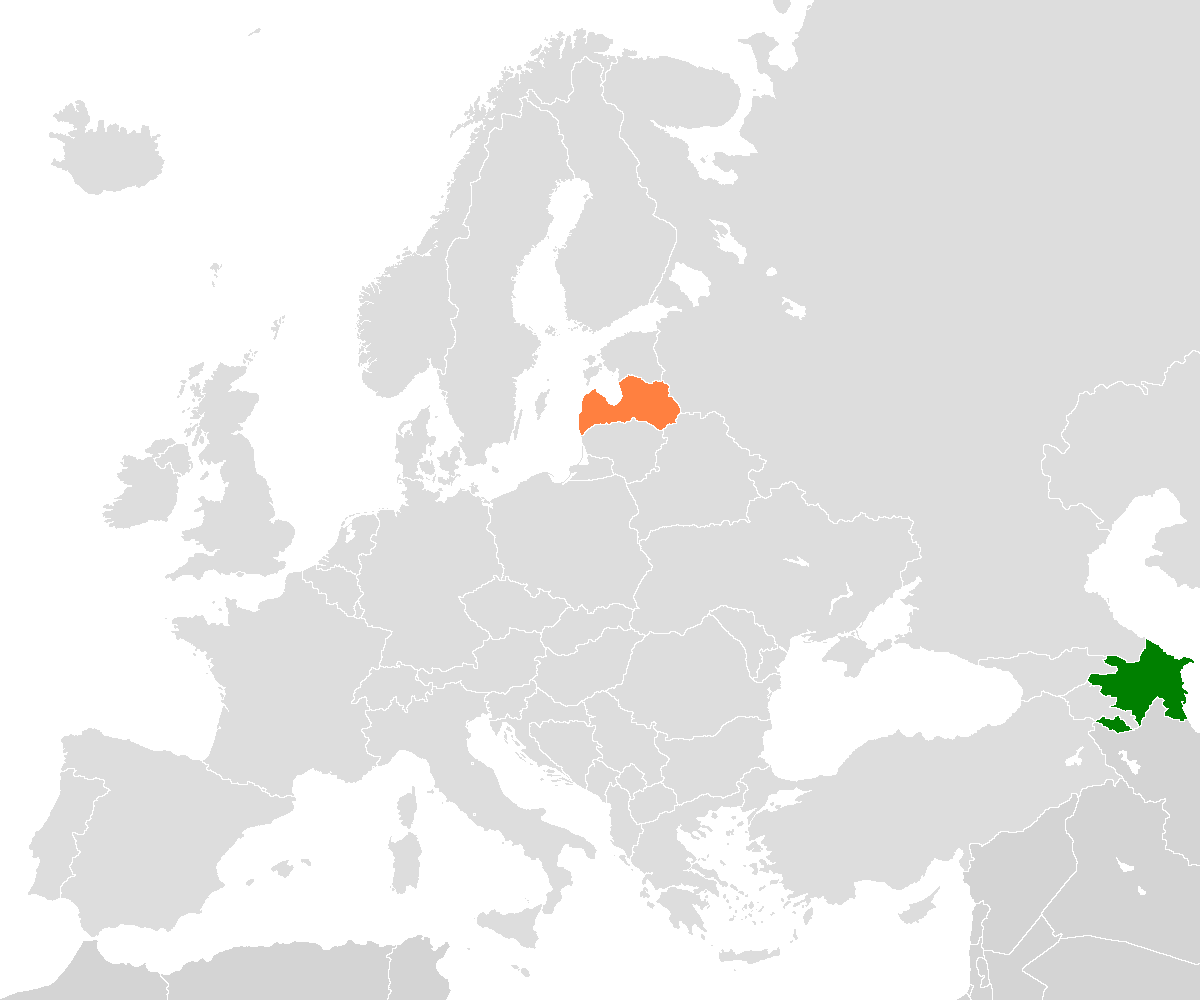

- Azerbaijan: Latvia

Diplomatic mission
- Embassy of Azerbaijan, Riga: Embassy of Latvia, Baku

Envoy
- Ambassador Elnur Sultanov: Ambassador Edgars Skuja

Azerbaijan–Latvia relations refer to the bilateral relations between Azerbaijan and Latvia. Since 2005, Azerbaijan has had a representative office in Riga, just as Latvia has an embassy in Baku.

The two countries cooperate at the level of governments, parliaments, local authorities, etc. In the international arena, cooperation between countries is carried out within the framework of various international organizations: the Council of Europe, the Organization for Security and Co-operation in Europe, the Organization of the Black Sea Economic Cooperation, etc. Both countries are Post-Soviet states.

== Diplomatic relations ==
The government of Azerbaijan recognized the independence of Latvia on August 30, 1991. The government of Latvia recognized the independence of Azerbaijan on January 8, 1992. Diplomatic relations between Azerbaijan and Latvia were established on January 11, 1994. 43 documents have been signed between Azerbaijan and Latvia. In July 2017, a document signing ceremony was held, during which President of Azerbaijan Ilham Aliyev and President of Latvia Raimond Vejonis signed the "Joint Declaration on the establishment of strategic partnership between the Republic of Azerbaijan and the Republic of Latvia".

== High-level visits ==
- On July 8, 1997, President of Latvia Guntis Ulmanis met with President of Azerbaijan Heydar Aliyev in the framework of the NATO Summit held in Madrid.
- On September 10, 1999, President of Latvia Vaira Vīķe-Freiberga met with President of Azerbaijan Heydar Aliyev during the Yalta conference in Ukraine.
- October 3–4, 2005, the President of Latvia Vaira Vīķe-Freiberga was in Baku on an official visit.
- President Ilham Aliyev paid a state visit to Latvia on October 3–5, 2006.

== Economic relations ==
Since July 23, 2018, the Azerbaijan Trading house has been operating in Riga. The volume of mutual trade in the first half of 2018 amounted to 15.5 million euros, which indicates an increase in trade volume by 20% compared to 2017. Latvian companies in Azerbaijan are implemented in such areas as finance, consulting, jurisdiction, transport, logistics, mechanical engineering, information technology, telecommunications, architecture, food production, pharmaceuticals, tourism, education, and so on. There are investments in a number of areas, such as wholesale trade, transport, consulting and others. Azerbaijan exports fruit and vegetable products, melons, processed agricultural products and so on to Latvia. In turn, livestock products, meat and dairy products, etc. are imported from Latvia to Azerbaijan. It is planned to conclude a number of agreements in the field of veterinary medicine and phytosanitary. In 2018, during the negotiations between the Chairman of the State Customs Committee Safar Mekhtiev and the Ambassador of Latvia to Azerbaijan Juris Maklakov, it was stated that it was necessary to conclude an agreement on the exchange of primary information. In 2019, a state-owned joint-stock company called "Latvian Railway" offered the management of the closed joint-stock company "Azerbaijan Railways" to join the "Bison" project. The essence of the project is to export and transit goods to Latvia from Azerbaijan. Joint production of textile products is planned. In 2007, there were 21 joint Azerbaijani-Latvian companies. Currently their number exceeds 40. According to the United Nations trade office (COMTRADE) statistics, in 2019 Azerbaijan imported carpets and other textile floor coverings from Latvia in the amount of 127 US dollars.

=== Trade turnover ===
| Year | Export | Import |
|---|---|---|
| 1999 | 1,169,164 | 1,630,873 |
| 2000 | 781,730 | 899,502 |
| 2001 | 632,567 | 458,874 |
| 2002 | 563,303 | 1,562,362 |
| 2003 | 1,314,838 | 762,991 |
| 2004 | 3,057,788 | 912,491 |
| 2005 | 4,134,063 | 2,428,015 |
| 2006 | 7,583,390 | 1 941,920 |
| First half of 2007 | 3,714,198 | 870,769 |

=== Trade turnover (in millions of US dollars) ===
| Year | Trade turnover | Import | Export | Balance |
|---|---|---|---|---|
| 2015 | 9142.5 | 8342 | 800.5 | -7541.9 |
| 2016 | 8,7 | 7,9 | 0,8 | -7,1 |
| 2017 | 15,62 | 13,32 | 2,3 | -11,29 |
| 2018 | 22,39 | 19,88 | 2,51 | 17,37 |

== Tourism ==
There is a direct air link between Azerbaijan and Latvia. In February 2017, Elmar Mammadyarov and Latvian Foreign Minister Edgars Rinkēvičs signed an agreement on visa exemption for service passport holders.

== Cultural links ==
Since 1988, the Association of Culture "Latvia-Azerbaijan" ("AZERI") has been operating in Riga. The legal basis of this society is the laws "on public organizations and associations" and "on the free development of national and ethnic groups of Latvia and their right to cultural autonomy", as well as the Constitution of the Republic of Latvia. In 2016, the cultural and information center "Corner of Azerbaijan" was opened in the academic library of the University of Latvia. In 2018, seven Azerbaijanis participated in various programs of the Riga Higher Law School on European Law and Economics. Currently, more than 170 students from Azerbaijan study at higher educational institutions in Latvia.

== Other areas ==
In January 2020, the Minister of Transport, Communications and High Technologies of Azerbaijan, Ramin Guluzade, met with the Ambassador of Latvia to Azerbaijan. During the meeting, prospects for cooperation in the field of telecommunications, Information and communication technologies (ICT), high technologies, air cargo delivery, etc. were discussed.

== See also ==
- Foreign relations of Azerbaijan
- Foreign relations of Latvia
