= Edgars Skuja =

Latvian diplomat

- Skuja in October 2023

Ambassador of Latvia to Azerbaijan
- Incumbent
- Assumed office September 2023
- Preceded by: Dainis Garančs

Permanent Representative of Latvia to NATO
- In office August 2019 – 1 September 2023
- Preceded by: Indulis Bērziņš
- Succeeded by: Māris Riekstiņš

Ambassador of Latvia to Austria
- In office September 2013 – August 2017

Ambassador of Latvia to Russia
- In office January 2009 – September 2013
- Preceded by: Andris Teikmanis
- Succeeded by: Astra Kurme

Ambassador of Latvia to Estonia
- In office February 2002 – September 2005

Personal details
- Born: 20 February 1966 (age 60) Valmiera, Latvian SSR, Soviet Union

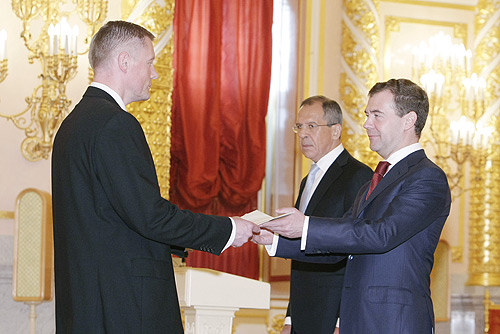
Skuja presenting his credentials to Dmitry Medvedev in May 2009.

Edgars Skuja (born 20 February 1966) is a Latvian diplomat who has been serving as Ambassador of Latvia to Azerbaijan since 2023. Previously, he served as Ambassador of Latvia to Estonia from 2002 to 2005, to Russia from 2009 to 2013, and to Austria from 2013 to 2017, with additional non-resident accreditation to Slovakia, Liechtenstein, and Switzerland. From 2019 to 2023, he was Permanent Representative of Latvia to NATO.

== Biography ==
Edgars Skuja was born on 20 February 1966 in Valmiera, Latvian SSR, then part of Soviet Union. He received his master's degree in 1992 from the Faculty of History and Philosophy of the University of Latvia and also studied International Relations at the Institute of Foreign Affairs of the University of Latvia that year. He has also taken part in study programs in Austria, South Korea, and Germany.

Skuja began his diplomatic career in 1993 at the Latvian Ministry of Foreign Affairs and then worked as Head of the CIS Countries at the ministry. He served as Director of the Second Political Department from 1996 to 1998 and led the Latvian Delegation to the OSCE in Vienna from 1998 to 2002.

In 2002, Skuja was appointed Ambassador Extraordinary and Plenipotentiary to Estonia, a position he held until 2005. He then served as Under-Secretary of State for Bilateral Issues at the Third Political Directorate from 2005 to 2009. In January 2009, he briefly led the Bilateral Relations Directorate and then was appointed Ambassador to Russia, where he served from 2009 to 2013, presenting his credentials to Russian president Dmitry Medvedev on 29 May 2009.

From September 2013 to August 2017, Skuja was Ambassador to Austria, with additional non-resident accreditation to Slovakia, Liechtenstein, and Switzerland. He then returned to the Ministry of Foreign Affairs as Ambassador and Director of the Security Policy Department from 2017 to 2019. He served as Permanent Representative of Latvia to NATO from 2019 to 2023.

In 2023, Skuja was appointed Ambassador Extraordinary and Plenipotentiary of Latvia to Azerbaijan, presenting his credentials on 24 October 2023.

Edgars Skuja has received several awards, including certificates of recognition from the Ministry of Foreign Affairs of Latvia in 1999 and the Cabinet of Ministers in 2000, as well as the Baltic Assembly Medal in 2007.

Skuja speaks Latvian, English, Russian and German. He is married and has two daughters.
