= Māris Riekstiņš =

Latvian politician and diplomat

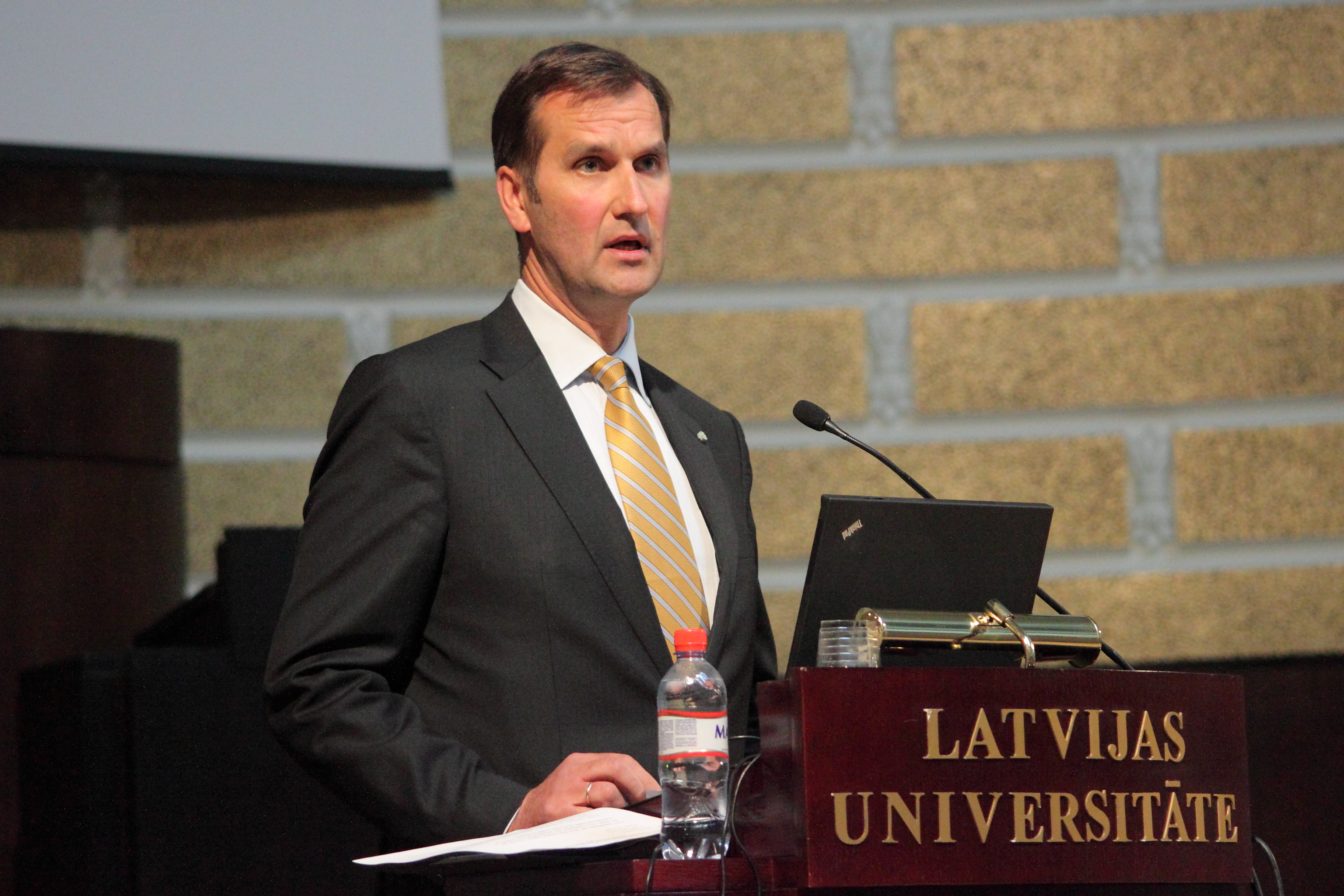
- Maris Riekstins in 2010

Permanent Representative of Latvia to NATO
- Incumbent
- Assumed office 1 September 2023
- President: Edgars Rinkēvičs
- Preceded by: Edgars Skuja
- In office 2 February 2011 – 31 August 2015
- President: Andris Bērziņš
- Preceded by: Jānis Eichmanis
- Succeeded by: Indulis Bērziņš

Ambassador of Latvia to the Russian Federation
- In office September 2017 – February 2023
- President: Raimonds Vējonis; Egils Levits
- Preceded by: Astra Kurme

Minister of Foreign Affairs of Latvia
- In office 8 November 2007 – 28 April 2010
- Prime Minister: Aigars Kalvītis; Ivars Godmanis; Valdis Dombrovskis
- Preceded by: Artis Pabriks
- Succeeded by: Aivis Ronis

Chief of Staff to the Prime Minister
- In office January 2007 – November 2007
- Prime Minister: Aigars Kalvītis
- Preceded by: Jurģis Liepnieks

Ambassador of Latvia to the United States
- In office December 2004 – January 2007
- President: Vaira Vīķe-Freiberga
- Preceded by: Aivis Ronis
- Succeeded by: Andrejs Pildegovičs

Personal details
- Born: 8 April 1963 (age 63) Rīga, then part of Latvian SSR, Soviet Union
- Party: People's Party (2006—2011)
- Children: 2
- Education: University of Latvia (LL.M.) Latvian Academy of Sport Education
- Profession: Lawyer

Māris Riekstiņš (born 8 April 1963 in Riga, Latvian SSR, Soviet Union) is a Latvian politician and diplomat and a former Foreign Minister of Latvia (November 2007 – April 2010). He is a former Ambassador of Latvia to the Russian Federation (September 2017 – February 2023). He currently serves as Permanent Representative of Latvia to NATO.

== Biography ==
Riekstiņš' career in the Ministry of Foreign Affairs began in 1992 as a Desk Officer of the Political Department of the Europe Division, followed by the position of the Director of the Western Europe Division. In 1993, he became the Under-secretary of State, soon assuming the duties of the State Secretary of the Ministry of Foreign Affairs. He remained in that position until his posting as the Ambassador of Latvia to the United States in 2004, and additionally non-resident Ambassador to Mexico. For most of 2007, Riekstiņš was Chief of Staff to the Prime Minister of Latvia Aigars Kalvītis. In November 2007 Riekstiņš was elected the Minister of Foreign Affairs of Latvia and held this position until April 2010, when his party stepped out of the government. In February, 2011 Ambassador Riekstiņš commenced his duties as the Permanent Representative of Latvia to NATO in Brussels.

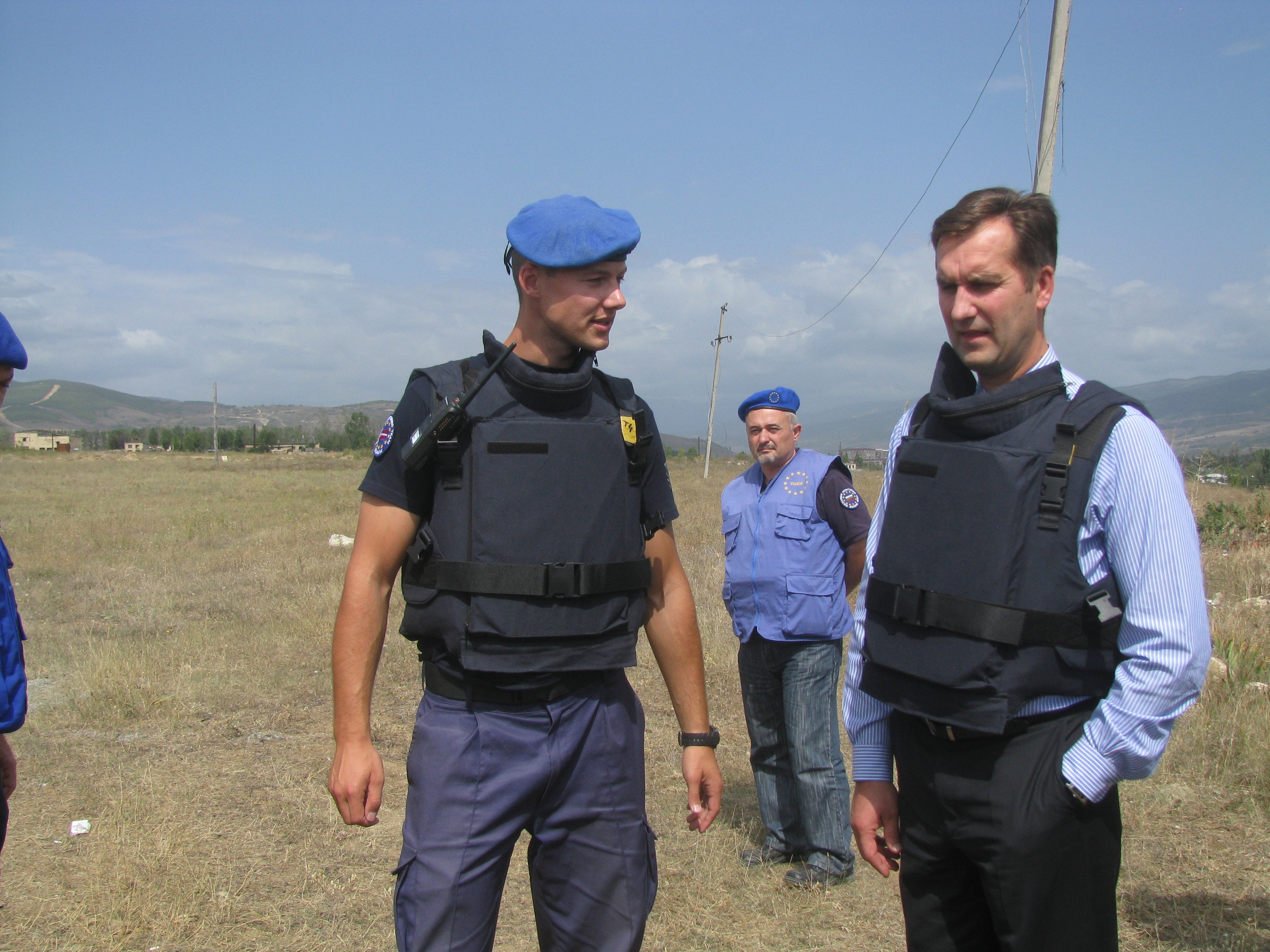
Maris Riekstins during his visit to Georgia, 2009.

In his career Riekstiņš has also been Head of the Latvian Delegation for Accession to NATO, Chairman of the Advisory Council for Latvia's membership of the World Trade Organization, Head of Delegation of Latvia in WTO talks in Seattle (1999), Doha (2000) and Cancun (2003). He has led the delegation for the U.S.-Baltic Partnership Charter and also been the Head of Latvian delegation for Estonian-Latvian sea border delimitation (agreement concluded in 1997 and ratified), as well as Lithuanian-Latvian sea border delimitation (agreement concluded in 1999, not ratified yet).

Riekstiņš has a law degree from the University of Latvia, preceded by graduation of the Faculty of Pedagogy of the Latvian Academy of Sport Education. He has two children.

== Party affiliation and political career ==
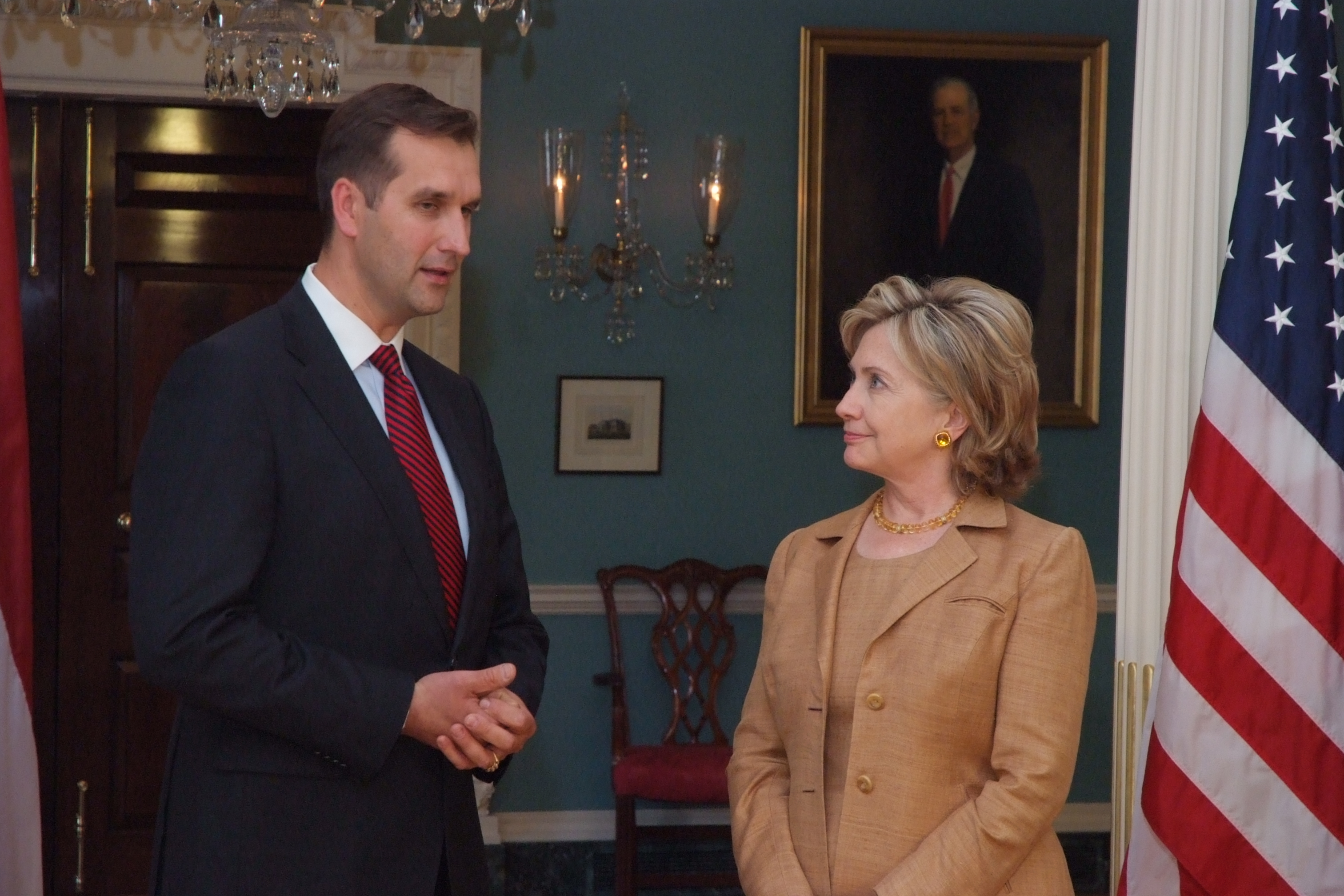
Maris Riekstins with former United States Secretary Of State Hillary Clinton at the Department of State in 2009.

In 2006 Riekstiņš joined the People's Party. He was a board member and presidential candidate in the 2007 Presidential election for the Party. He held the position of Foreign Minister in three coalition governments under the leadership of Prime Minister Aigars Kalvītis (People's Party), Prime Minister Ivars Godmanis (LPP/LC) and Prime Minister Valdis Dombrovskis (New Era). In the run up to the 10th Saeima election in October 2010 Riekstiņš was a candidate for the parliament of the Political Alliance "For a Good Latvia", consisting of the People's Party and LPP/LC. 8 members were returned to the Saeima from the alliance.

== Education ==
- 1981–1985 Latvian Academy of Sport Education, Faculty of Pedagogy, teacher, Master's Degree
- 1987–1993 University of Latvia, Faculty of Law, lawyer, Master's Degree

== Work experience ==
- 1987–1992 - Deputy Chairman; Desk Officer of the Committee of Latvian Youth Organisations
- March 1992 -November 1992 - Director of the Western Europe Division; Director of the Europe Division; Desk Officer of the Political Department of the Europe Division at the Ministry of Foreign Affairs of the Republic of Latvia
- November 1992 -August 1993 - Under-secretary of State of the Ministry of Foreign Affairs of the Republic of Latvia
- 1993 - 2004 - State Secretary of the Ministry of Foreign Affairs of the Republic of Latvia
- 2004 - 2007 - Ambassador Extraordinary and Plenipotentiary of the Republic of Latvia to the United States of America
- 2006 - 2007 - Ambassador Extraordinary and Plenipotentiary of the Republic of Latvia to the United Mexican States (country of residence: USA)
- January 2007 – November 2007 - Chief of Staff to the Prime Minister of Latvia
- November 2007 – April 2010 - Minister of Foreign Affairs of Latvia
- May 2010 - Leading Scholar, Association "Sustainable Society Institute"
- February 2011 - 2015 Permanent Representative of the Republic of Latvia to NATO

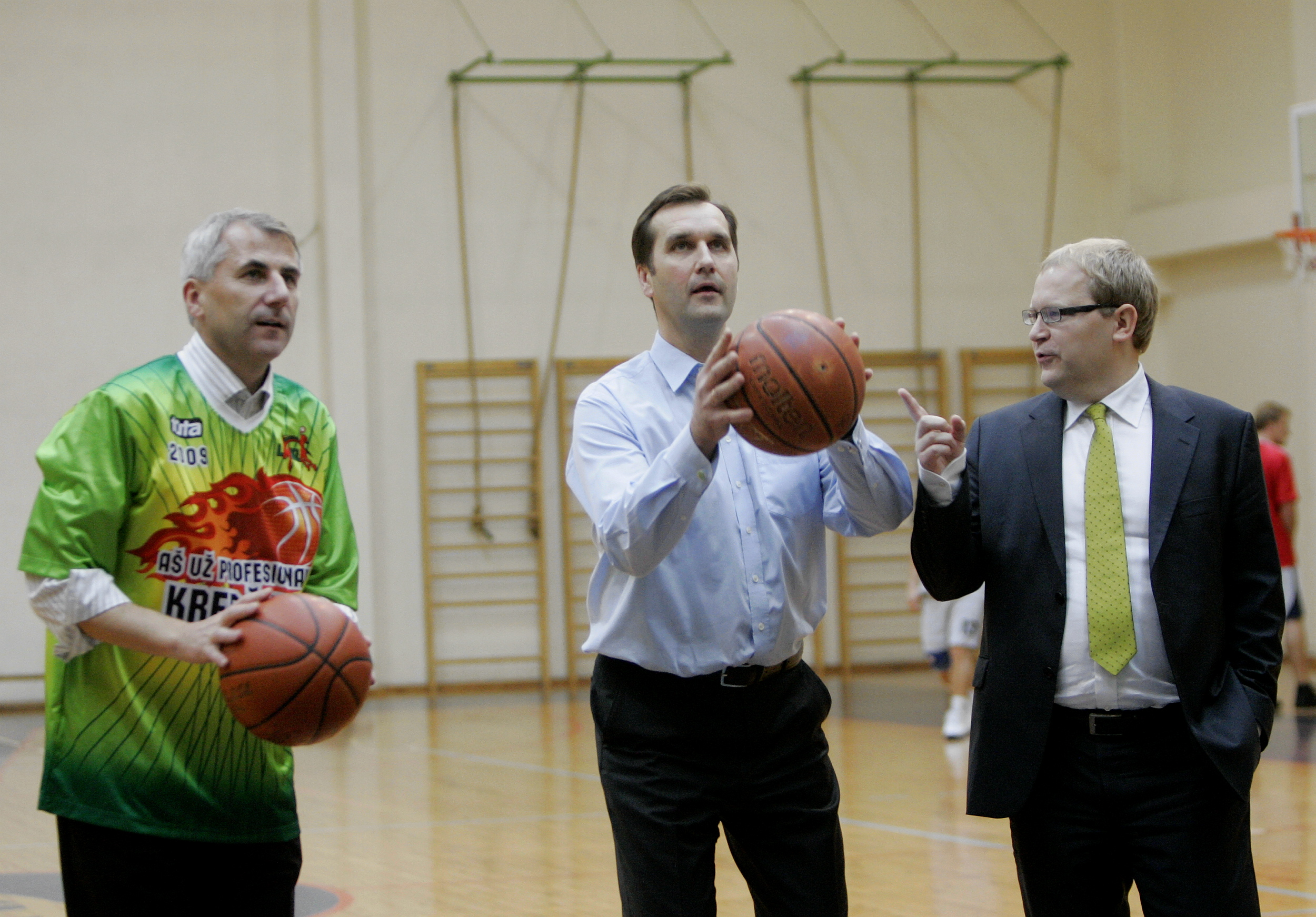
Minister of Foreign Affairs of Latvia Maris Riekstins during an annual basketball event between Latvia, Lithuania, Estonia and Finland, with Minister of Foreign Affairs of Lithuania Vygaudas Ušackas (left) and Minister of Foreign Affairs of Estonia Urmas Paet (right).

== Other related activities ==
- 1995–2004 - Chairman of the Control Committee of Strategic Goods of Republic of Latvia
- October 1995 - July 1996 - Head of the Latvian delegation for negotiations on Latvian-Estonian sea border delimitation
- July 1996 - July 1999 - Head of the Latvian delegation for negotiations on Latvian-Lithuanian sea border delimitation
- 1996–2004 - Chairman of the Diplomatic Service Agency's Shareholders Council
- 1997–1998 - Head of the Latvian delegation for the U.S.-Baltic Partnership Charter
- 1998–2004 - Head of the Latvian-Italian Economic Working Group
- 1999–2004 - Chairman of the Advisory Council for the Membership of Latvia in the World Trade Organisation
- January 2002 - July 2002 - Chairman of Supervisory Committee on Organisation of the NATO Aspirant Countries Summit in Riga on 5 and 6 July 2002
- 2002–2004 - Head of the Latvian delegation for accession negotiations with the North Atlantic Treaty Organisation (NATO)
- 2003 - Deputy Chairman of the Council, Latvia Basketball Association
- May 2009 - Chairman of the Counsellors' Convention, Latvian Academy of Sport Education
- June 2010 –November 2010 - Ambassador-at-Large, Ministry of Foreign Affairs of the Republic of Latvia
- 2011–2015 - Member of the Chapter of Orders

== Awards ==
1998	Royal Norwegian Order of Merit, Commander
2000	Royal Norwegian Order of Merit, Grand Officer
2001	French National Order of Merit, Grand Officer
2001	Order of the Lithuanian Grand Duke Gediminas, 4th class
2003	3rd Class Order of the Cross of Terra Mariana of Estonia
2003	Ordem do Infante D. Henrique Grande Oficial, Portugal
2003	Three Star Order of Latvia, Commander
2004	Order of Merit of the Italian Republic "Grand Official"
2004	National Order of Merit of Malta
2007	Cross of Recognition of the Republic of Latvia, Grand Officer
2008	Order of Prince Yaroslav the Wise of the Republic of Ukraine
2008	Grand Cross of Merit of the Order of Malta

== Language skills ==
Riekstiņš is a native Latvian-speaker with proficiency in English, Russian and German.
