= Latvia–Russia relations =

- Latvia: Russia

Latvia–Russia relations are the bilateral foreign relations between Latvia and Russia. Diplomatic relations between the two countries were established on 11 August 1920 after the Latvian War of Independence ended in Latvian victory with Russia recognizing Latvian sovereignty and renounced all territorial claims on Latvia. Over the century, the countries had a complex and difficult relationship. Modern-day relations have been strained and mostly unfriendly.

Latvia has an embassy in Moscow, and Russia has an embassy in Riga. Both Russia and Latvia are members of the UN and OSCE.

After the 2022 Russian invasion of Ukraine, Latvia downgraded diplomatic relations and expelled the Russian ambassador in January 2023.

== History ==
=== 1920–1940 ===
From 1920 to 1940, relations between the countries had existed. On August 11, 1920, the Republic of Latvia and the Russian Soviet Federal Socialist Republic signed a peace treaty. Article 14 of the Treaty provided for the establishment of diplomatic and consular contacts between the parties upon ratification of the peace treaty. In 1922 the USSR was founded, which took over the foreign affairs of its member states (including Russia).

The Latvian Embassy was located in Moscow from 1920 to 1940. Latvia's first diplomatic representative in Soviet Russia was Ambassador Jānis Vesmanis, who was accredited on 2 November 1920. Latvian consular representations were established during the Civil War period (1919–1920) in Blagoveshchensk and Murmansk. Consular functions were also performed by representatives of the Latvian Interim Government: in Northern Russia by Alfreds Ikners (Arkhangelsk), in Southern Russia by Kristaps Bahmanis (Kyiv) and Rūdolfs Liepiņš (Don and Kuban). From June 1919 to October 1920, Latvia was also represented in Siberia and the Urals by Jānis Mazpolis (Vladivostok).

=== Soviet period ===
The Soviet occupation of Latvia in 1940, which included deportations to Siberian Gulags (June deportation), created a large degradation of Latvian-Russian relations. Nazi Germany then occupied Latvia in 1941 German occupation of Latvia during World War II, until the USSR returned in 1944 to resume occupation, resulting in further deportations. During this period many Latvians fled with the retreating Germans or to Sweden. During the occupation, the Latvian diplomatic service continued its work in exile.

The Soviet occupation dramatically increased the number of Russians living in Latvia in a short space of time, often replacing those who were deported, executed or had fled. The high influx of Russians and the removal of Latvian as the official language caused further deterioration in the Latvia-Russian relations between citizens.

=== Relations 1991 to 2021 ===
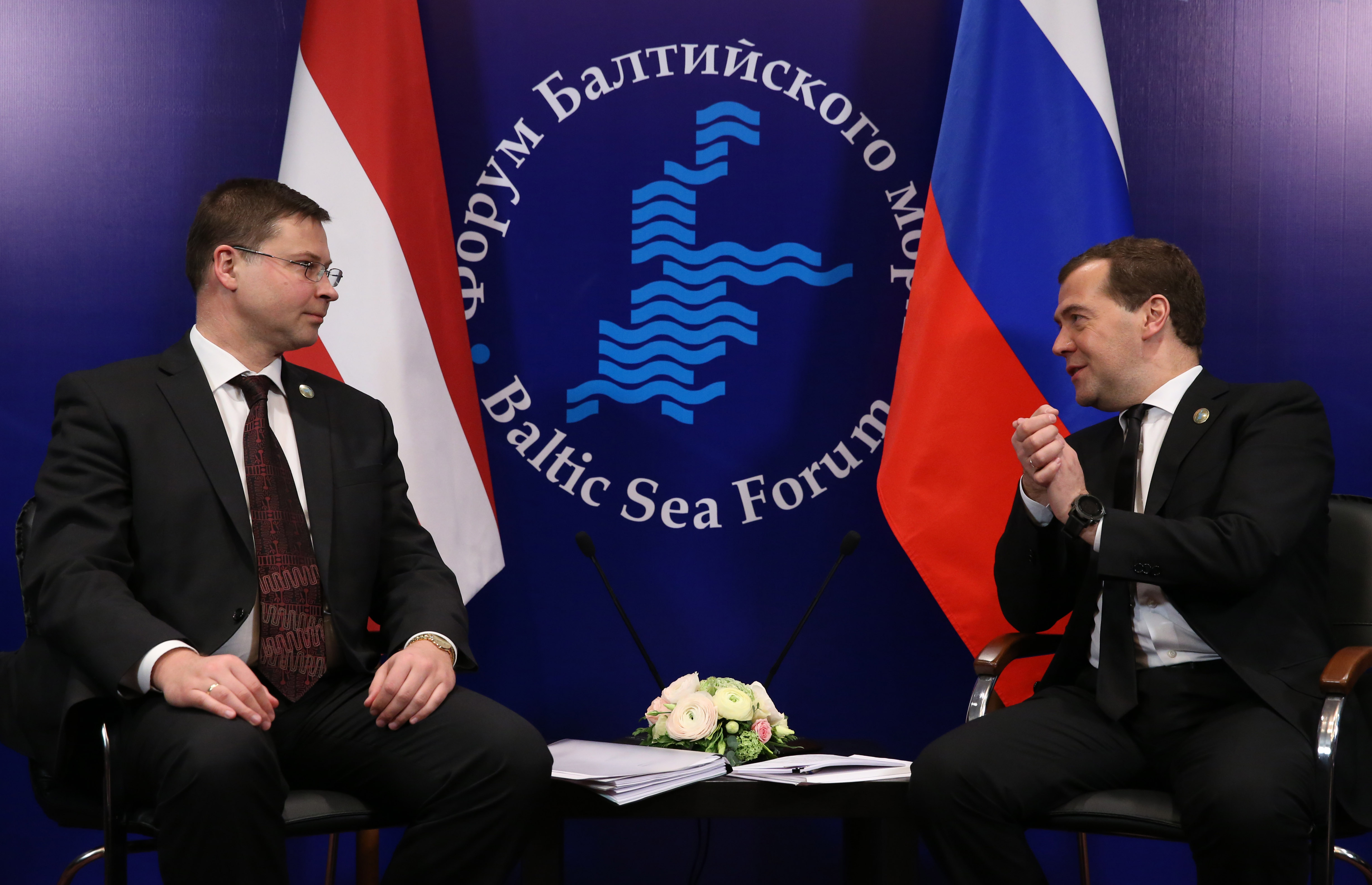
A meeting between the prime ministers of both countries Valdis Dombrovskis and Dmitry Medvedev during the 2013 Baltic Sea Forum

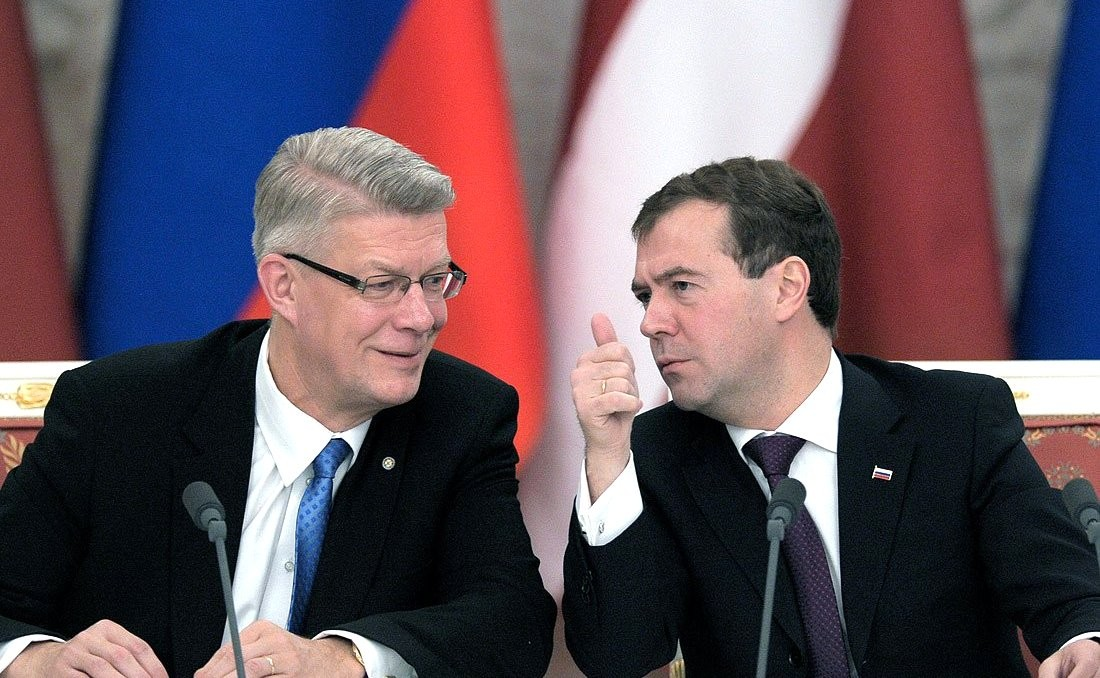
Latvian President Valdis Zatlers with Russian President Dmitry Medvedev in a signing ceremony during Zatlers' 2010 official visit in Russia.

In 1991, Latvia regained independence from the USSR through the Latvian independence and democracy poll, 1991. In 2007, the border treaty between the two states was ratified after Latvia dropped a claim for a small pre-World War II territory that's currently part of modern Russia. While speaking at the Latvia-Russia Business Forum in St. Petersburg, President Valdis Zatlers spoke in favor of a visa-free regime between the EU and Russia. In an interview with Latvian newspaper Segodnya, President Andris Berzins stated that the "reality is that Russia is our neighbor, and we need to look for ways to develop good neighborly relations between our two countries no matter what". On December 13, 2018, Latvian parliament adopted a declaration condemning the aggressive actions of Russia in the Kerch Strait incident.

==== Withdrawal of Russian troops and the decommissioning of Skrunda-1 ====
Following the dissolution of the Soviet Union, the Russian Federation maintained its military presence in Latvia. It had troops stationed there and it continued to run the Skrunda-1 radar station. As early as 1992 Russia agreed to start withdrawing its troops from Latvia. Following a 30 April 1994 agreement, Latvia allowed Russia to run the Skrunda-1 radar station for four more years in exchange for the full withdrawal of the Russian troops. Russia adhered to this agreement and withdrew its remaining troops from Latvia in August 1994 (except for the troops stationed around Skrunda, who received permission to stay longer). One of the towers of the Skrunda-1 base was demolished with the help of the United States in May 1995. In August 1998, Skrunda-1 suspended operations. Russia eventually dismantled the equipment and withdrew its remaining military personnel the following year. These steps marked a symbolic end to the Russian military presence and World War II on the territory of Latvia.

==== Diplomatic visits ====
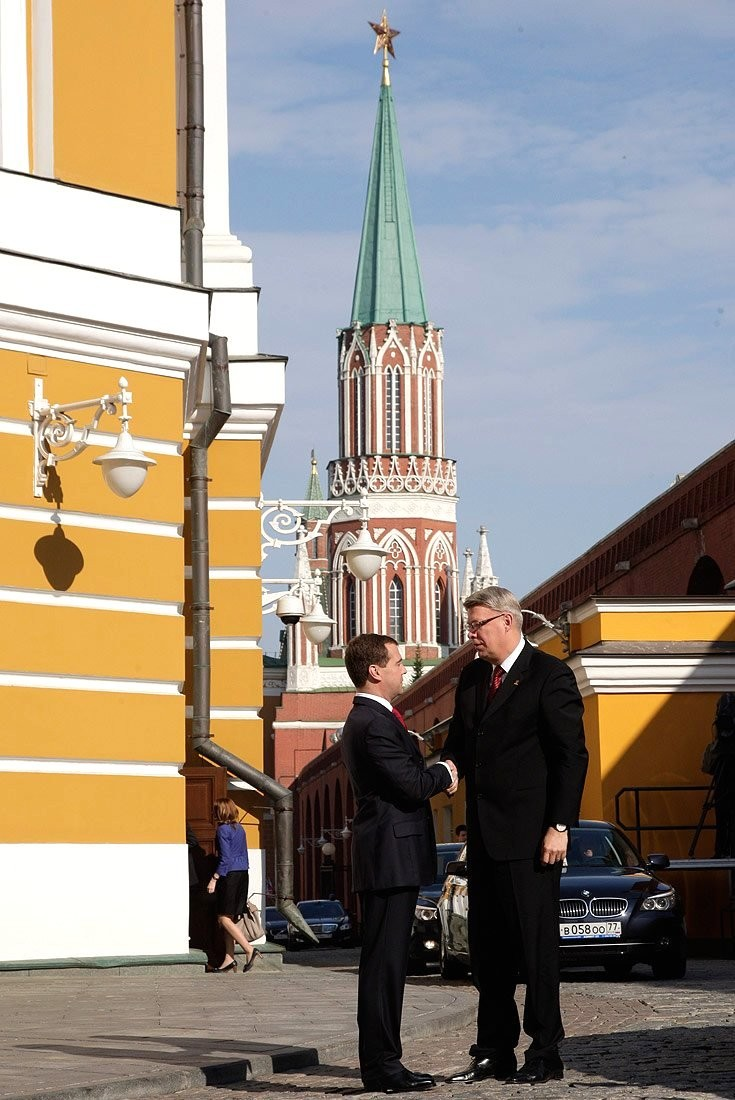
Zatlers meeting with Medvedev in the Moscow Kremlin.

President Valdis Zatlers attended the Moscow Victory Day Parade on Red Square on 9 May 2010, attending the 65th VE Day celebrations. President Vaira Vīķe-Freiberga previously had attended the 60th anniversary event in 2005. In December 2010, Zatlers made his first state visit to Moscow, with the four-day visit including talks with Russian President Dmitry Medvedev, as well as Prime Minister Vladimir Putin, Moscow Mayor Yuri Luzhkov and Patriarch Kirill of Moscow. The following year, Kremlin Chief of Staff Sergei Naryshkin made a working visit to Latvia.

In early 2014, Latvian President Andris Berzins visited Sochi to attend the 2014 Winter Olympics opening ceremony, where he had a five-minute conversation with Putin.

=== 2014–2022 ===
However, the Russian occupation of Crimea and the War in Donbas urged Latvia to support Ukraine and implement sanctions against Russia imposed by the EU. On June 5, 2015, Russian government "temporarily" banned Latvian and Estonian canned fish products citing "health" concerns. Half of the countries' exports share accounted for Russia. In March 2015, Latvian MEP Sandra Kalniete and Speaker of the Polish Senate Bogdan Borusewicz were both denied entry into Russia under the existing sanctions regime, and were thus unable to attend the funeral of murdered opposition politician Boris Nemtsov.

=== Relations 2022 to date ===
President of Latvia Egils Levits strongly condemned the Russian invasion of Ukraine, calling for "all possible support, including weapons" to Ukraine and "the harshest possible sanctions" against Russia.

Latvia, as one of the EU countries, imposed sanctions on Russia shortly after the invasion started, in response, Russia added all EU countries to the list of "unfriendly nations". Latvia joined other countries in spring 2022 in declaring a number of Russian diplomats persona non grata.

Russian state broadcasting TV stations were banned in Latvia in March 2022.

On 11 August 2022 the Latvian Saeima designated Russia a state sponsor of terrorism and in September 2022, Latvia, along with Poland, Lithuania and Estonia decided to close entry for Russian citizens with Schengen visas, including those issued by third countries.

In January 2023 Latvia, in support of Estonia, withdrew its ambassador from Russia and expelled Russia's ambassador to Latvia in a permanent downgrading of diplomatic ties. Russia labelled the actions as "Russophobia".

As a continuing rejection of the Russian language, in 2023 Latvia imposed a requirement for an estimated 20,000 citizens who hold a Russian passport and no Latvian documents, to pass a Latvian language test and prove their loyalty, or face deportation in 2024 if they fail and do not leave voluntarily. In August it was announced that over 5,000 citizens had refused to take the language test or apply for a temporary residence permit and were likely to be asked to leave in September.

The ban on entry of Russian citizens to Latvia was extended to March 2024 and Latvia ceased issuing any visas to Russians, even for humanitarian reasons in June 2023.

In January 2024 Russia terminated the tax treaty between the two nations.

== Trade ==
In 2021 Russia exported $3.52 billion of goods to Latvia with refined oil products as the main item. Latvia exports were valued at $1.38 billion with alcoholic drinks topping the trade. Between 1995 and 2021 Russian exports grew at an average of 9.07% p.a. with Latvia exports growing at 5.77% p.a. in the same period.

Russian exports have fallen following Latvian decisions and the EU sanctions over Russia, as a result of the 2022 Russian invasion of Ukraine.

== Controversies and issues of contention ==
=== Minority rights ===
Russia often criticizes Latvia for discrimination against the Russian-speaking population and has also participated in a number of cases of complaints against Latvia in the European Court of Human Rights as a third party. These cases also dealt with the violation of the rights of the Russian minority in Latvia. Such cases included Slivenko v. Latvia, Kononov v. Latvia, Vikulov and others v. Latvia, Sisojeva And Others v Latvia, and Vasilevskiy v. Latvia.

=== Spying allegations ===
In April 2004 Latvia expelled Second Secretary of the Russian Embassy in Rīga Pyotr Uzhumov, who had allegedly been trying to gather information on Latvia's defence forces, for activities "incompatible with his diplomatic status" to which Russia responded by expelling first secretary of the Latvian Embassy in Moscow.

In March 2018 for activities not consistent with their duties and in solidarity with the United Kingdom's response to the poisoning of Sergei and Yulia Skripal Latvia expelled a second secretary rank Russian diplomat within the Russian embassy in Rīga. Russia responded by expelling a Latvian diplomat from Russia.

In late May 2018 a former employee of Latvian Railways was sentenced to 18 months in prison and 60 hours of community service for espionage. The man had filmed trains carrying NATO equipment and sent the videos to a contact in Russia's Kaliningrad Oblast. In August 2018 a farmer in Alūksne Municipality was given a three-year suspended sentence for collecting open-source information near the Latvian-Russian border at an alleged request of Russian authorities that was classified as espionage.

=== Attacks on the diplomatic mission ===
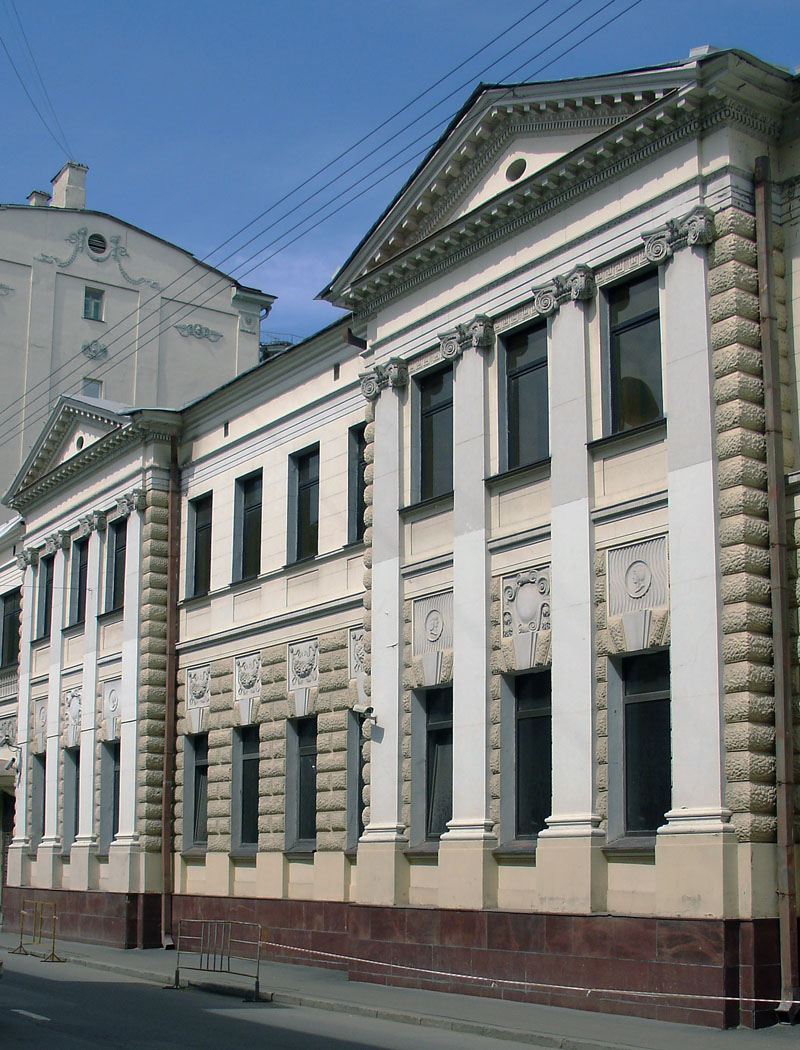
Embassy of Latvia in 3 Chaplygin Street, Moscow

On the night to May 30, 2014 petards and smoke grenades were thrown at the Latvian general consulate in St. Petersburg by members of The Other Russia party, who set up a USSR flag on the façade of the building, distributed pamphlets and demanded release of their party member Beness Aijo that was detained for incitement to violently overthrow the government of Latvia and change the political system, as well as to liquidate Latvia's national independence. On July 13, 2015, the Latvian consulate in St. Petersburg was once again attacked by members of The Other Russia who threw smoke bombs and eggs at the consulate and distributed flyers, with one activist detained and charged for 'petty hooliganism'.

On the evening of Victory Day on May 9, 2018 smoke grenades and flares were thrown at the Embassy of Latvia in Moscow and two people were detained. The next day the Ministry of Foreign Affairs of Latvia presented a diplomatic note to the Russian authorities, demanded it "to take all precautionary measures to prevent such attacks and to punish the perpetrators" and "ensure repair of the damage", emphasizing that "this is not the first case when the security of the Latvian diplomatic mission in Russia has been exposed to risks".

== Bilateral agreements ==
While some agreements have been signed by representatives of Latvia and Russia, not all have been passed by their respective legislatures and are therefore not in force. This list is limited to agreements in force.

- Agreement between the Government of the Republic of Latvia and the Government of the Russian Federation on Cooperation in the Field of Fishery, in force 21 July 1992 (indefinite)
- Agreement between the Republic of Latvia and the Russian Federation on Transfer of Sentenced Persons, in force 10 June 1993 (indefinite)
- Agreement between the Government of the Republic of Latvia and the Government of the Russian Federation on Regulation of the Resettlement Process and Protection of the Rights of Resettlers, in force 2 June 1993 (extended twice, now indefinite)
- Agreement between the Government of the Republic of Latvia and the Government of the Russian Federation on Customs Border Posts, in force 24 June 1993 (extended by subsequent protocol which is indefinite)
- Agreement between the Government of the Republic of Latvia and the Government of the Russian Federation in the Field of Communications, in force 2 June 1993 (indefinite)
- Agreement between the Government of the Republic of Latvia and the Government of the Russian Federation on Joint Measures Aimed Toward Exploitation of the Pipeline Situated in the Territory of the Republic of Latvia, in force 2 June 1993 (indefinite)
- Agreement between the Republic of Latvia and the Russian Federation on Terms, Time Limits, Procedure of a Complete Withdrawal of the Armed Forces of the Russian Federation and the Legal Status thereof during Withdrawal from the Territory of Latvia, in force 27 February 1995 (indefinite)
- Agreement between the Government of the Republic of Latvia and the Government of the Russian Federation on Social Protection of Retired Military Personnel of the Russian Federation and their Family Members, Residing on the Territory of Latvia, in force 27 February 1995 (indefinite)
- Agreement between the Government of the Republic of Latvia and the Government of the Russian Federation on Activities of the Authorized Border Agents, in force 14 December 1994 (indefinite)
- Consular Convention between the Republic of Latvia and the Russian Federation, in force 18 May 1997 (indefinite)
- Agreement between the Government of the Republic of Latvia and the Government of the Russian Federation on Mutual Travels of Citizens, in force 18 January 1995 (indefinite)
- Agreement between the Government of the Republic of Latvia and the Government of the Russian Federation on Principles of Cooperation and Conditions of Bilateral Relations in the Field of Transport, in force 14 June 1995 (indefinite)
- Agreement between the Government of the Republic of Latvia and the Government of the Russian Federation on International Road Transport, in force 16 March 1996 (indefinite)
- Agreement between the Government of the Republic of Latvia and the Government of the Russian Federation on Trade Shipping, in force 15 May 1995 (indefinite)
- Agreement between the Government of the Republic of Latvia and the Government of the Russian Federation on Cooperation in the Field of Border Defence, in force 26 February 1996 (indefinite)

=== Terminated or denounced ===
- Agreement between the Republic of Latvia and the Russian Federation on Legal Status of Radio-location Station Skrunda During Those Provisional Existence and Demontage, adopted 30 Apr 1994 (terminated 21 October 1999)
- Agreement between the Republic of Latvia and the Russian Federation on Legal Assistance and Legal Relations in Civil, Family and Criminal Matters, entered force 28 March 1995, denounced in 2024

== Ambassadors ==
=== Ambassadors of Latvia in Russia ===
- Jānis Peters (1991–1997)
- Imants Daudišs (1997–2001)
- Normans Penke (2001–2004)
- Andris Teikmanis (2005–2008)
- Edgars Skuja (2009–2013)
- Astra Kurme (2013–2017)
- Māris Riekstiņš (2017–2023)

== See also ==
- Foreign relations of Latvia
- Foreign relations of Russia
- Latvia–Russia border
- Latvia–Ukraine relations
- Russian Latvians
