= Kirill Tatarinov =

Business executive

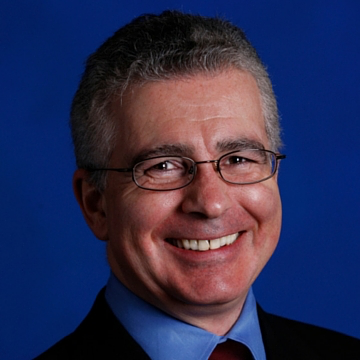
- Born: Moscow, Russia

Kirill Tatarinov is Chairman of the Board at ITRS. He was previously a CEO at Citrix Systems, Executive Vice President of Microsoft Business Solutions and the Executive Vice Chairman at Acronis..

== Background and education ==
Tatarinov grew up in Moscow. His father was a computer engineer in the former Soviet Union. Tatarinov was interested in technology from an early age and he received a master's diploma of systems engineering from Moscow University of Transport Engineering (MIIT) specializing in computers. During his student years, Tatarinov wrote programs for hardware clones on punch cards.

In 1990, Tatarinov left the Soviet Union for Israel. He then moved to Australia in 1991. In 1994, Tatarinov emigrated to the United States after Patrol Software, the software startup he co-founded, was acquired by Houston-based BMC Software. He received an MBA from Houston Baptist University in 1997.

== Career ==
Tatarinov began his career working for several systems, networking, and consulting companies in the Soviet Union, Israel, and Australia. In 1991, he co-founded Patrol Software in Australia, which made a database and systems management product. Tatarinov served as the company's chief architect and head of research and development.

Houston-based enterprise software maker BMC Software, Inc acquired Patrol Software in 1994. Tatarinov worked for BMC in the U.S. for eight years following the acquisition and became the company's chief technology officer.

Tatarinov joined Microsoft in 2002 to lead the company's Management and Solutions Division. In 2007, he became the executive vice president of Microsoft Business Solutions. overseing Microsoft Dynamics Customer relationship management and Enterprise resource planning software. Under his leadership, the Microsoft Dynamics business doubled in revenue. He also led the division's transition to the cloud. Tatarinov left Microsoft in October 2015 as part of a management overhaul.

In January 2016, Tatarinov was named the CEO of Citrix Systems. He also joined the company board.

In May 2016, at the company's Citrix Synergy customer event, Tatarinov presented a new strategy for the company, which included focusing on growing core products. Later that year, he reorganized Citrix and spun off the company's GoTo line of video conferencing products. Tatarinov left Citrix in July 2017, having served 18 months as CEO.

In February 2019, Tatarinov joined the Acronis Board of Directors to drive the adoption of Acronis Cyber Protection products and services by the enterprise and public sectors. Seven months later, in September 2019, Acronis appointed Tatarinov as Executive Vice Chairman to continue building Acronis' cyber protection strategy across enterprise sector. In 2025, Acronis became majority-owned by EQT. A new board of directors was appointed, and Kirill resigned.

In July 2021, Tatarinov joined ITRS, a business-to-business technology company specializing in AI, as Chairman of the Board to accelerate expansion plans.
