= Embassy of Latvia, Moscow =

Diplomatic mission of Latvia to Russia

- Latvijas Republikas vēstniecība Krievijas Federācijā (Latvian)
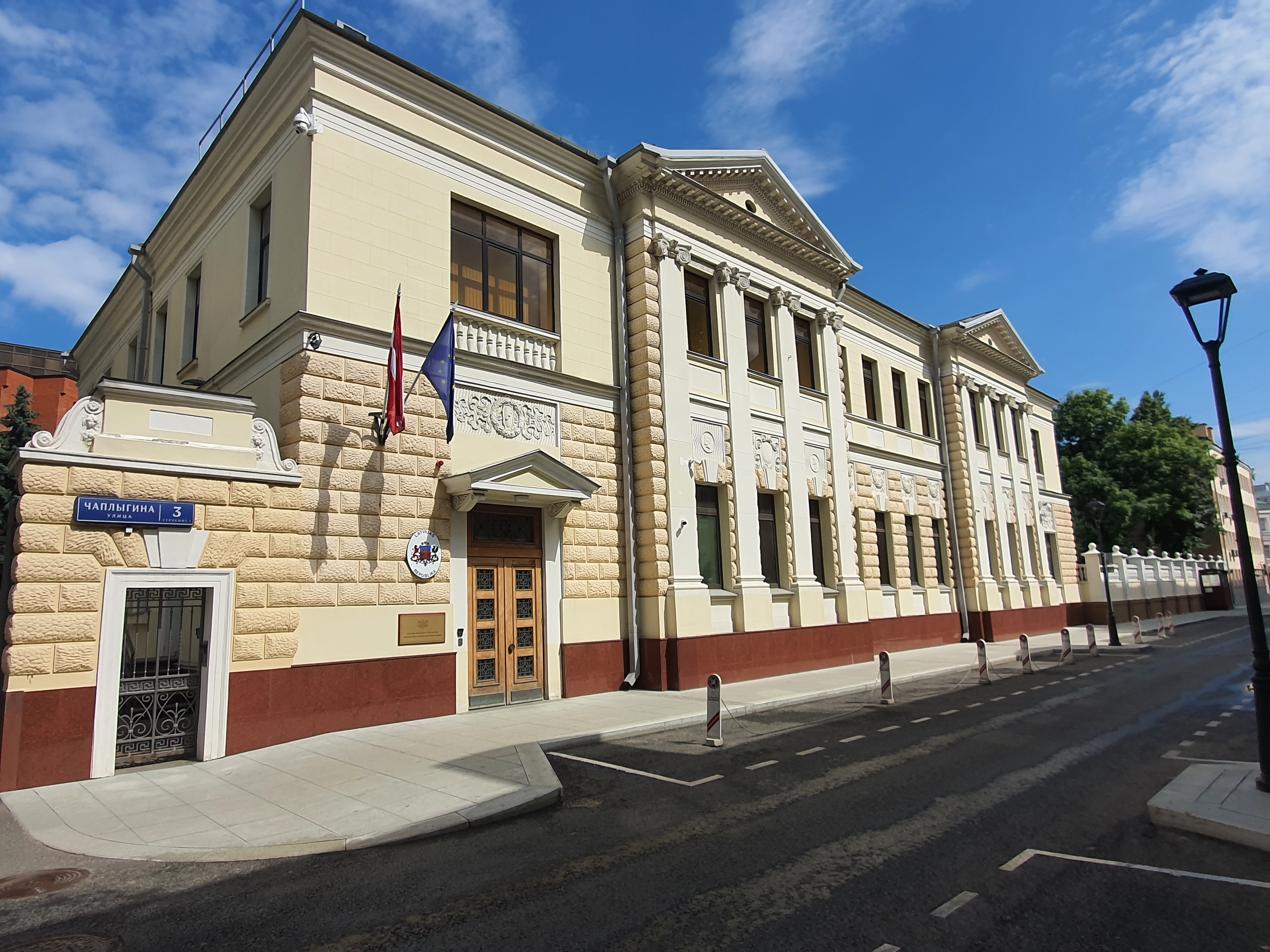

- Location within Moscow
- 55.764072°N 37.646526°E
- Location: Ul. Chaplygina Street, 3 (Russian: Ул. Чаплыгина, 3); Moscow, Russia

Embassy of the Republic of Latvia in Moscow (Latvian: Latvijas Republikas vēstniecība Krievijas Federācijā, Russian: Посольство Латвийской Республики в Российской Федерации) is the chief diplomatic mission of Latvia in the Russian Federation. It is located at 3 Chaplygina Street in the Basmanny District of Moscow.

== History ==
The building of the embassy is the former mansion of Lev Vladimirovich Gautier-Dufayer, a merchant in the Russian Empire, built in 1898. The estate was nationalised after the October Revolution and transferred to Latvia in 1921 following the Latvian–Soviet Peace Treaty and the establishment of diplomatic relations between Latvia and Soviet Russia.

During the Soviet occupation of Latvia, the building served as the representation of the Latvian SSR at the central government of the Soviet Union.

In 1992, after restoration of independence of Latvia, the representation was again transformed into the embassy of Latvia.

== Latvian ambassadors in Moscow ==
=== Representatives to Soviet Russia and the USSR (1920–1940) ===
- Jānis Vesmanis (1920–1921; with Soviet Russia)
- Ēriks Mārtiņš Feldmanis (1921–1923)
- Kārlis Ozols (1923–1929)
- Jānis Seskis (1929–1932)
- Alfrēds Bīlmanis (1932–1935)
- Roberts Liepiņš (1935–1936)
- Fricis Vilhelms Kociņš (1936–1940)

=== Ambassadors in the Russian Federation (from 1991) ===
- Jānis Peters (1991–1997)
- Imants Daudišs (1997–2001)
- Normans Penke (2001–2004)
- Andris Teikmanis (2005–2008)
- Edgars Skuja (2009–2013)
- Astra Kurme (2013–2017)
- Māris Riekstiņš (2017–2023)

== See also ==
- Latvia–Russia relations
- Diplomatic missions in Russia
