= Aivis Ronis =

Latvian diplomat and politician

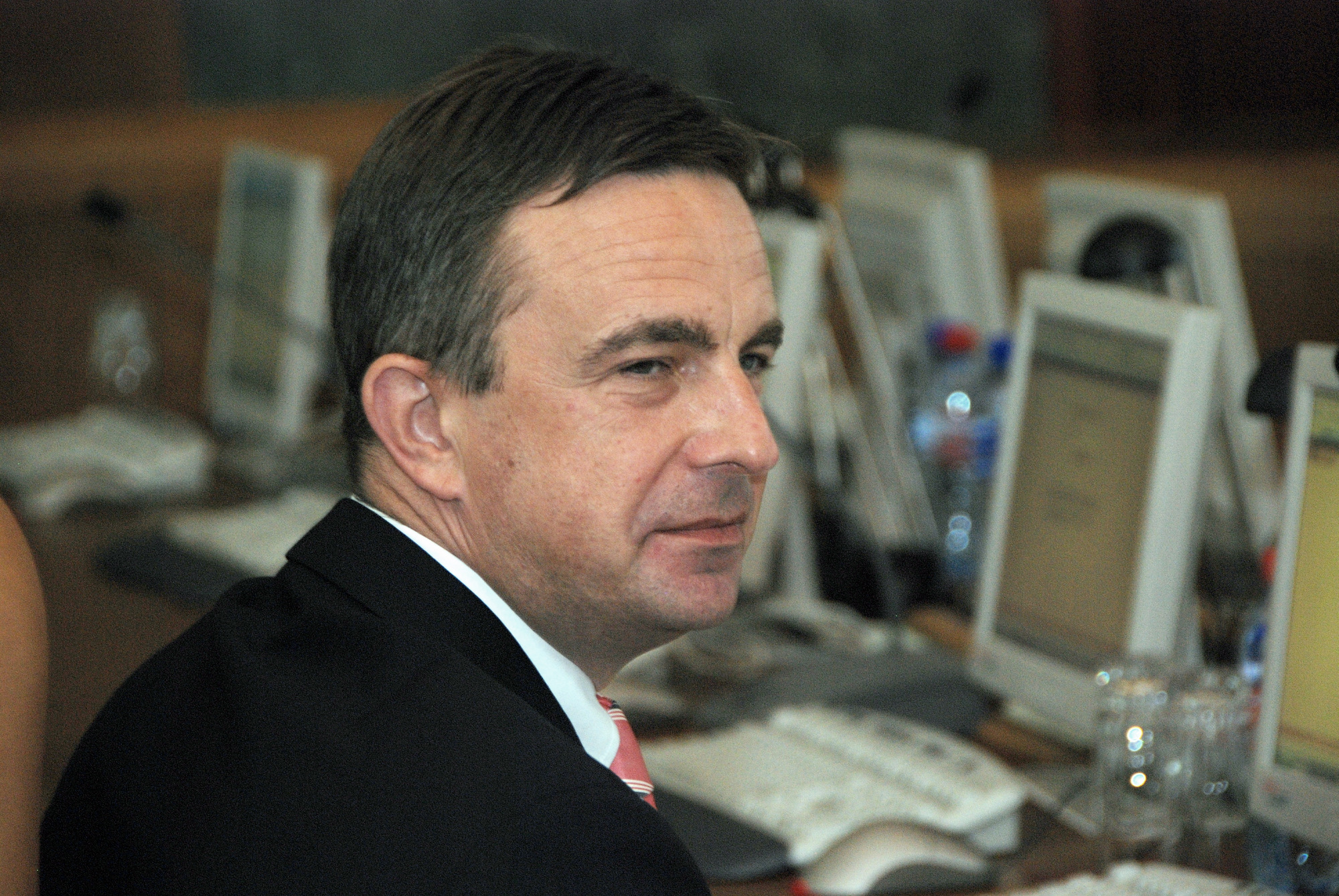
- Aivis Ronis in 2010

Minister for Transport of Latvia
- In office 25 October 2011 – 1 March 2013
- Prime Minister: Valdis Dombrovskis
- Preceded by: Uldis Augulis
- Succeeded by: Anrijs Matīss

Minister for Foreign Affairs of Latvia
- In office 29 April 2010 – 3 November 2010
- Prime Minister: Valdis Dombrovskis
- Preceded by: Māris Riekstiņš
- Succeeded by: Ģirts Valdis Kristovskis

Personal details
- Born: 20 May 1968 (age 58) Kuldīga, Latvian SSR
- Party: Independent
- Spouse: Dace Rone
- Education: University of Latvia
- Profession: Diplomat, politician

Aivis Ronis (born 20 May 1968) is a Latvian diplomat and politician and was Minister for Foreign Affairs of Latvia from 29 April 2010 to 3 November 2010, from 2011 to 2013 he was Minister for Transport of Latvia. From June 2000 to September 2004 he was the Latvian ambassador to the United States.
