= Estonia–Latvia relations =

Bilateral relations of Estonia and Latvia

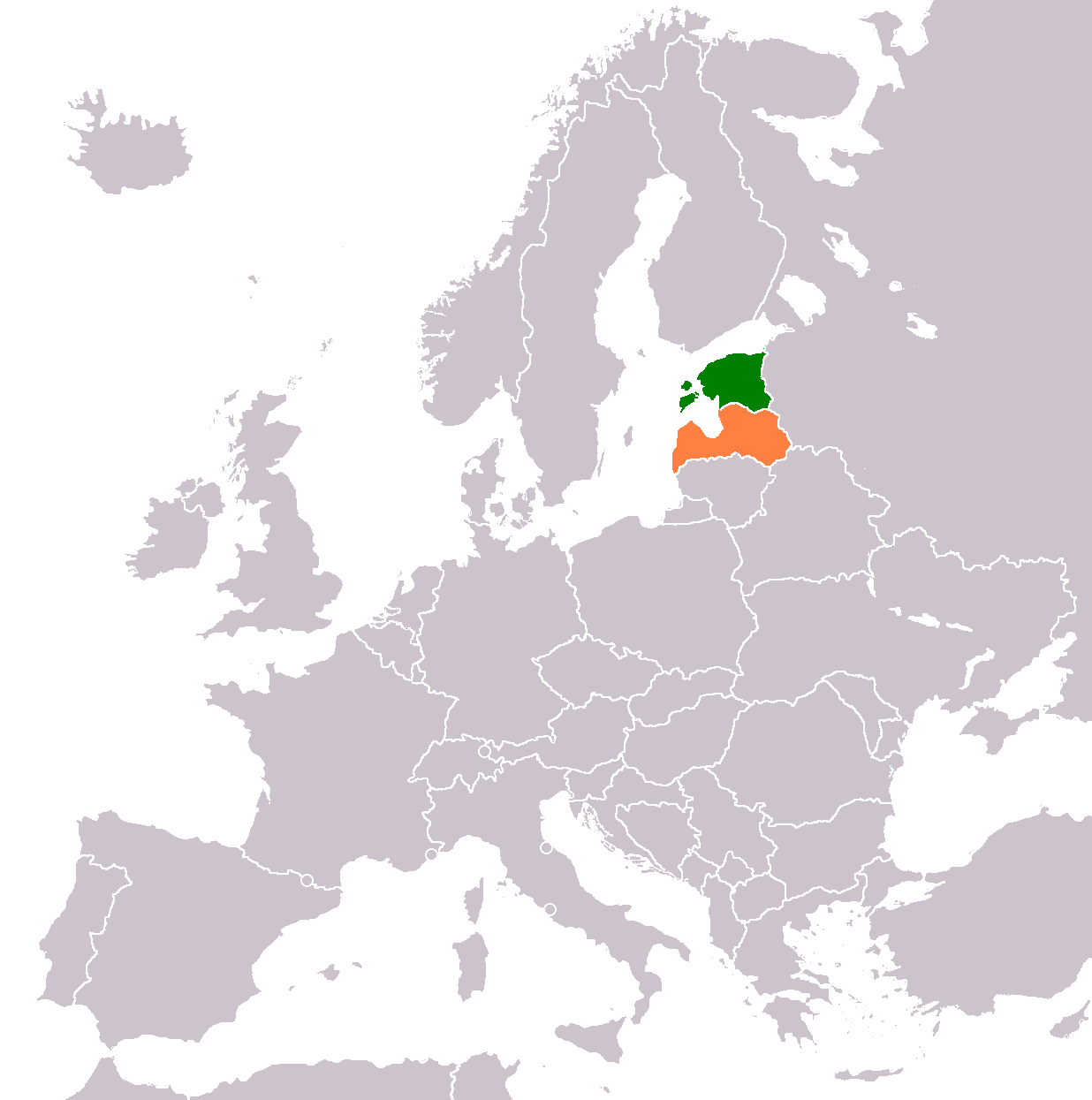

- Estonia: Latvia

Estonia and Latvia, the two northernmost Baltic states, share 343 km of common borders and a long common history, having since the 13th century been ruled by the Livonian Order, Poland–Lithuania, Sweden and finally, until achieving independence in 1918, the Russian Empire. They were both re-occupied by the USSR between 1945 and 1991. The countries reestablished diplomatic relations on 3 January 1992. Estonia has an embassy in Riga, and Latvia has an embassy in Tallinn.

== Common membership ==
Both countries are full members of the Council of the Baltic Sea States, Joint Expeditionary Force, NATO and the European Union. The two countries were members of the Baltic Free Trade Area from 1994 until 2004 after which they joined the European Union.

== Trade ==
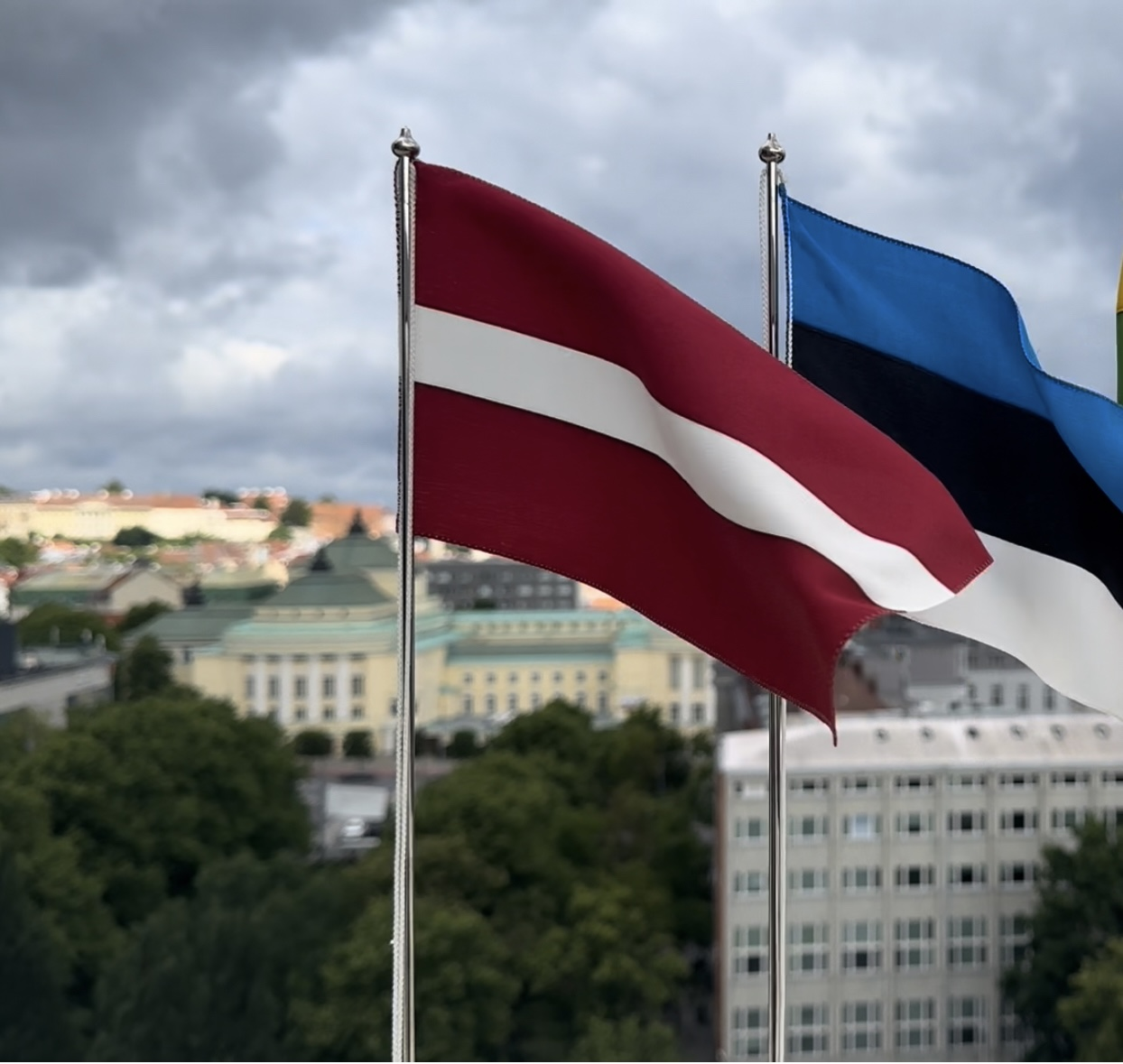
Estonian and Latvian flags

In 2006, Latvia accounted for 3% of Estonian exports. Latvia accounted for 5% of Estonian imports.

== Agreements ==
There are 15 bilateral agreements between the 2 countries many of them signed trilaterally with Lithuania.

== Defence cooperation ==
The three Baltic countries signed a trilateral defence agreement on 12 February 1995.

== Embassies ==
Estonia has embassy in Riga, Skolas iela, but has plans to relocate to a building in Old town when it is completed.

== See also ==
- Foreign relations of Estonia
- Foreign relations of Latvia
- 2004 enlargement of the European Union
