= Kalniņš =

Family name

Origin
- Origin: Latvian
- Meaning: "little hill"

Kalniņš (Old orthography: Kalnin(g); feminine: Kalniņa) is a native Latvian-language surname, derived from the Latvian word for "hill" (kalns). May also be Russified as Kalnin (Калнин, Калнынь). In 2015 the two were the third most common male and female surnames in Latvia. Notable people with the surname include:

== Kalniņš ==
- Alfrēds Kalniņš, Latvian composer
- Arnis Kalniņš, Latvian economist, academic, and politician
- Brūno Kalniņš, Latvian social democratic politician and historian
- Eduards Kalniņš, Latvian general
- Gatis Kalniņš, Latvian striker
- Harald Kalnins, German-Latvian bishop
- Imants Kalniņš, Latvian composer
- Ivars Kalniņš, Latvian film and television actor
- Jānis Kalniņš, Canadian composer, son of Alfreds
- Jānis Kalniņš, Latvian ice hockey goaltender
- Juris Kalniņš (1938–2010), Latvian basketball player and Olympic medalist
- Leonīds Kalniņš (born 1957), Latvian politician and general
- Ojārs Ēriks Kalniņš (1949–2021), Latvian politician and diplomat
- Pauls Kalniņš, Latvian social democratic politician and four-time acting president
- Pēteris Kalniņš, Latvian luger
- Rodrigo Kalniņš, Latvian actor
- Rolands Kalniņš, Latvian film director

== Kalniņa ==
- Aleksandra Briede née Kalniņa (1901–1992), Latvian sculptor
- Gunta Kalniņa (born 1975), Latvian playwright
- Irma Kalniņa, American and Latvian diplomat and politician, M.P.
- Klāra Kalniņa (1874–1964), Latvian feminist, suffragette, editor, and politician
- Rēzija Kalniņa, Latvian actress
- Zanda Kalniņa-Lukaševica, Latvian politician
