= Latvians in the United Kingdom =

Ethnic group in the United Kingdom

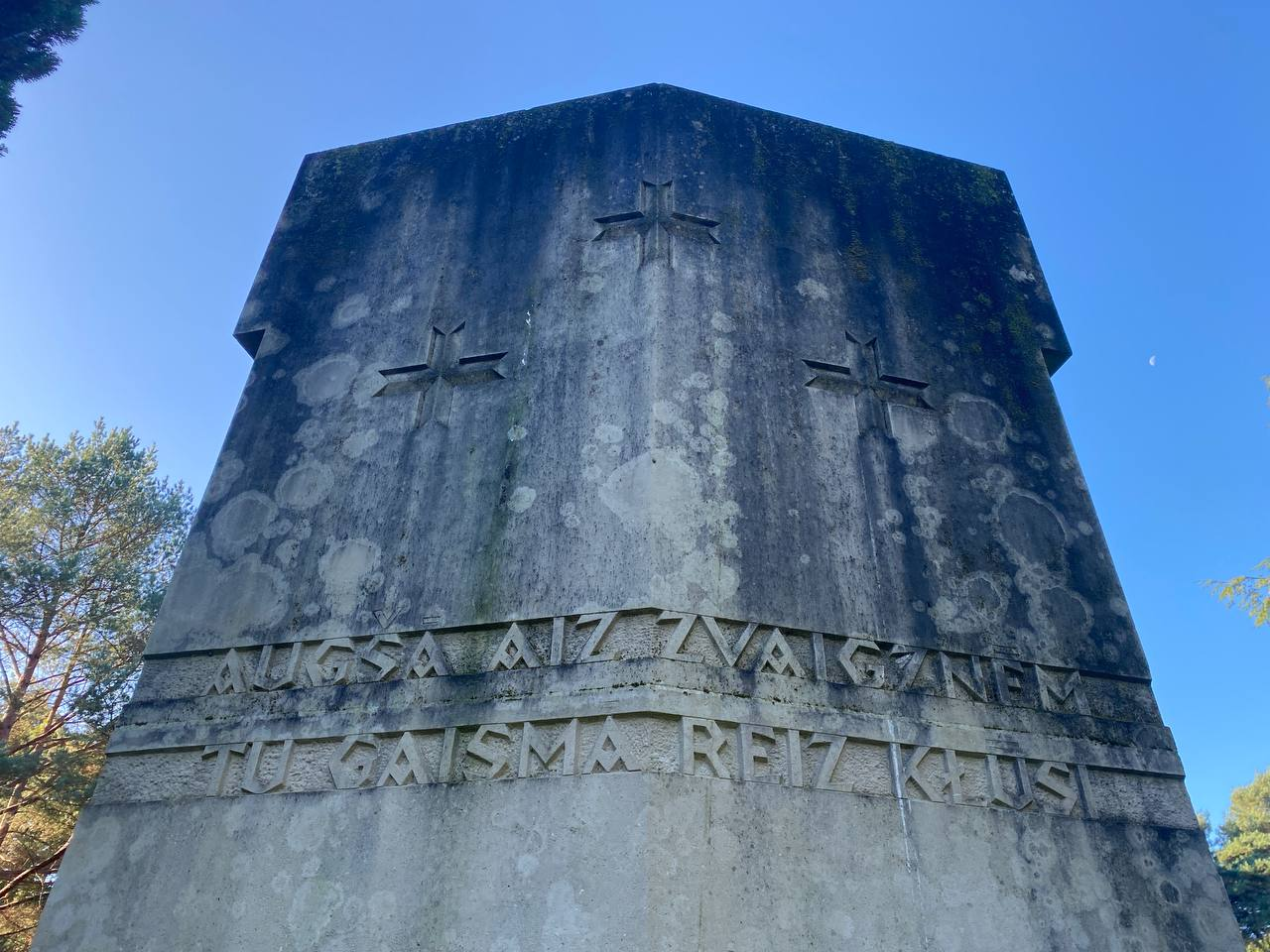
- Monument at the Latvian burial grounds in Brookwood Cemetery with the inscription "Augšā aiz zvaigznēm tu gaismā reiz kļūsi"

Total population
- Latvian-born residents in the United Kingdom: 98,660 (2021/22 Census) (Note: Does not include ethnic Latvians born in the United Kingdom or those with Latvian ancestry); England: 87,365 (2021); Scotland: 6,924 (2022); Wales: 1,219 (2021); Northern Ireland: 3,152 (2021)

Regions with significant populations
- London, Coventry, Kingston upon Hull, Bradford, Northampton, Derby, Glasgow and East Anglia (King's Lynn, Boston, Peterborough)

Languages
- English, Latvian, Russian.

Religion
- Christianity · Judaism • Protestantism

Related ethnic groups
- Balts

Latvians in the United Kingdom are those born or raised in the UK, or residents, who are of ethnically Latvian descent or originate from Latvia, a country in North-Eastern Europe.

== History, population and settlement ==
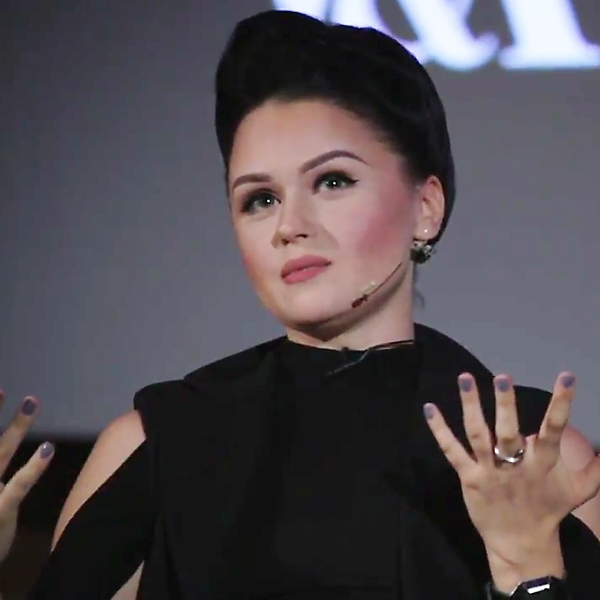
Viktoria Modesta (Viktorija Moskaļova), British model and musician of Latvian Russian origin

In the early 20th century, Latvian workers began to settle in Glasgow. Notable groups of Latvian-born migrants historically also included people of Latvian Jewish, Baltic German and Latvian Russian origin.

Significant numbers of Latvians moved to the UK after World War II in 1947 under a government-backed scheme called 'Westward Ho!' recruiting workers from among displaced persons (DPs). The first group were women called the 'Balt Cygnets' who arrived in the UK from displaced persons camps in the British occupation zone in Germany in 1947.

The 2001 UK Census had recorded 4,275 UK residents born in Latvia.

Another wave of Latvian migration to the United Kingdom came after the 2004 accession of Latvia to the European Union, of which the UK was then a fellow member.

The 2011 UK Census already recorded 53,977 Latvian-born residents in England, 692 in Wales, 4,475 in Scotland, and 2,297 in Northern Ireland.

In 2021, there were approximately 90,000 Latvian nationals estimated to be residing in the United Kingdom. Historically, the highest estimated number of Latvian nationals residing in the United Kingdom was in 2017, when there were 117,000.

There is a Latvian section at Brookwood Cemetery in Surrey.

== Latvian burial ground, Brookwood Cemetery ==
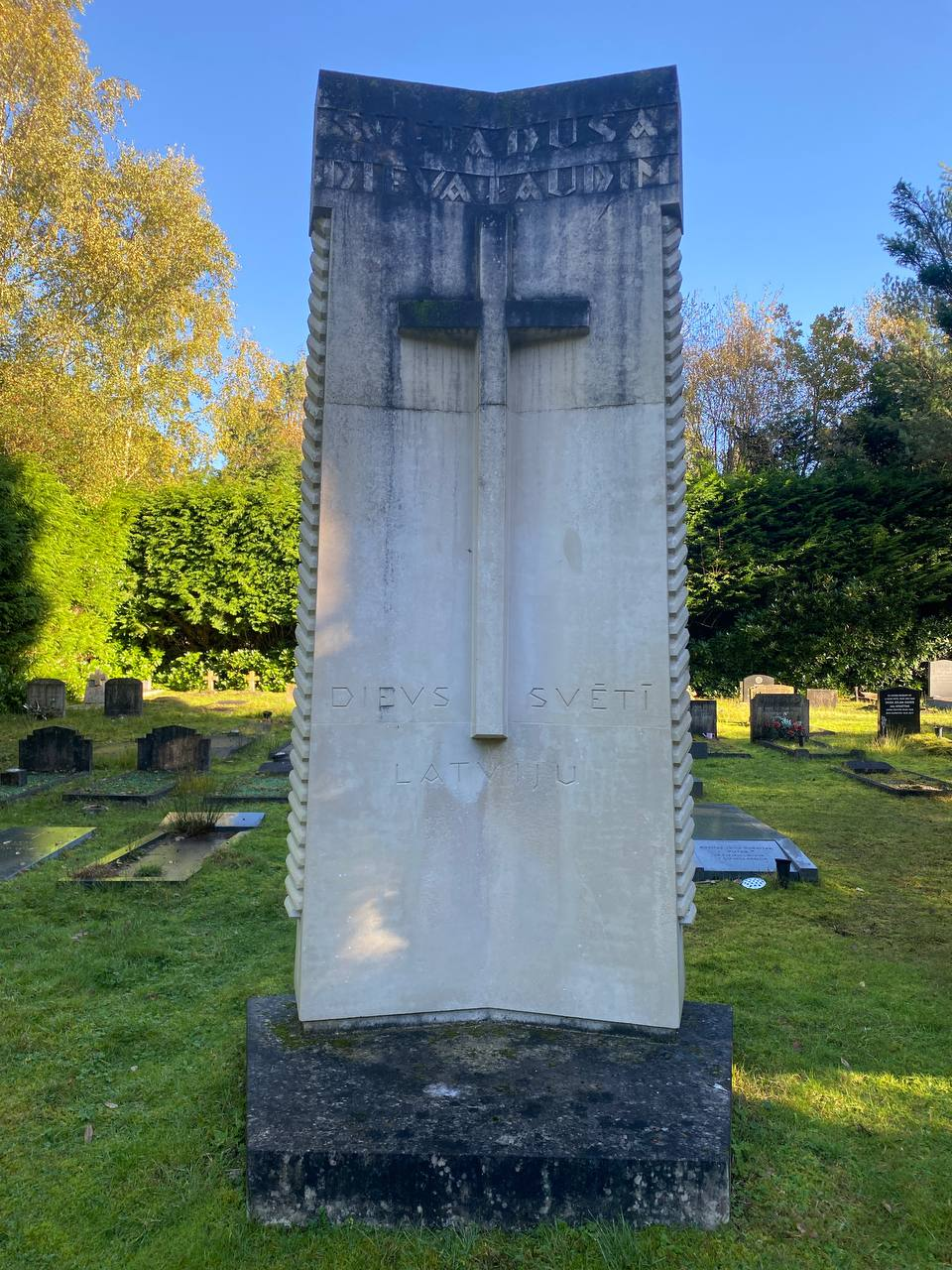
Main monument at the Latvian burial ground at Brookwood Cemetery

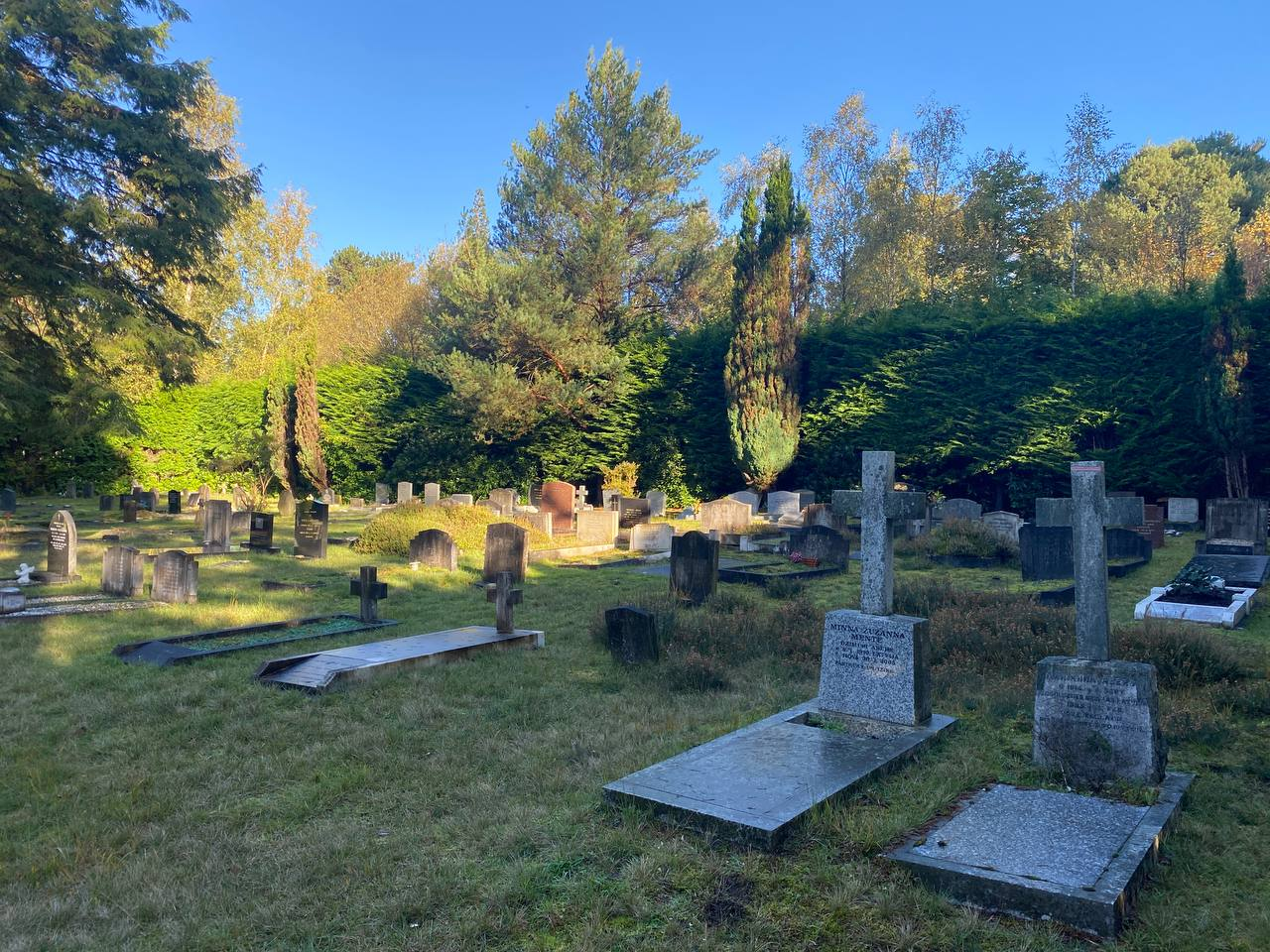
Latvian burials at Brookwood Cemetery

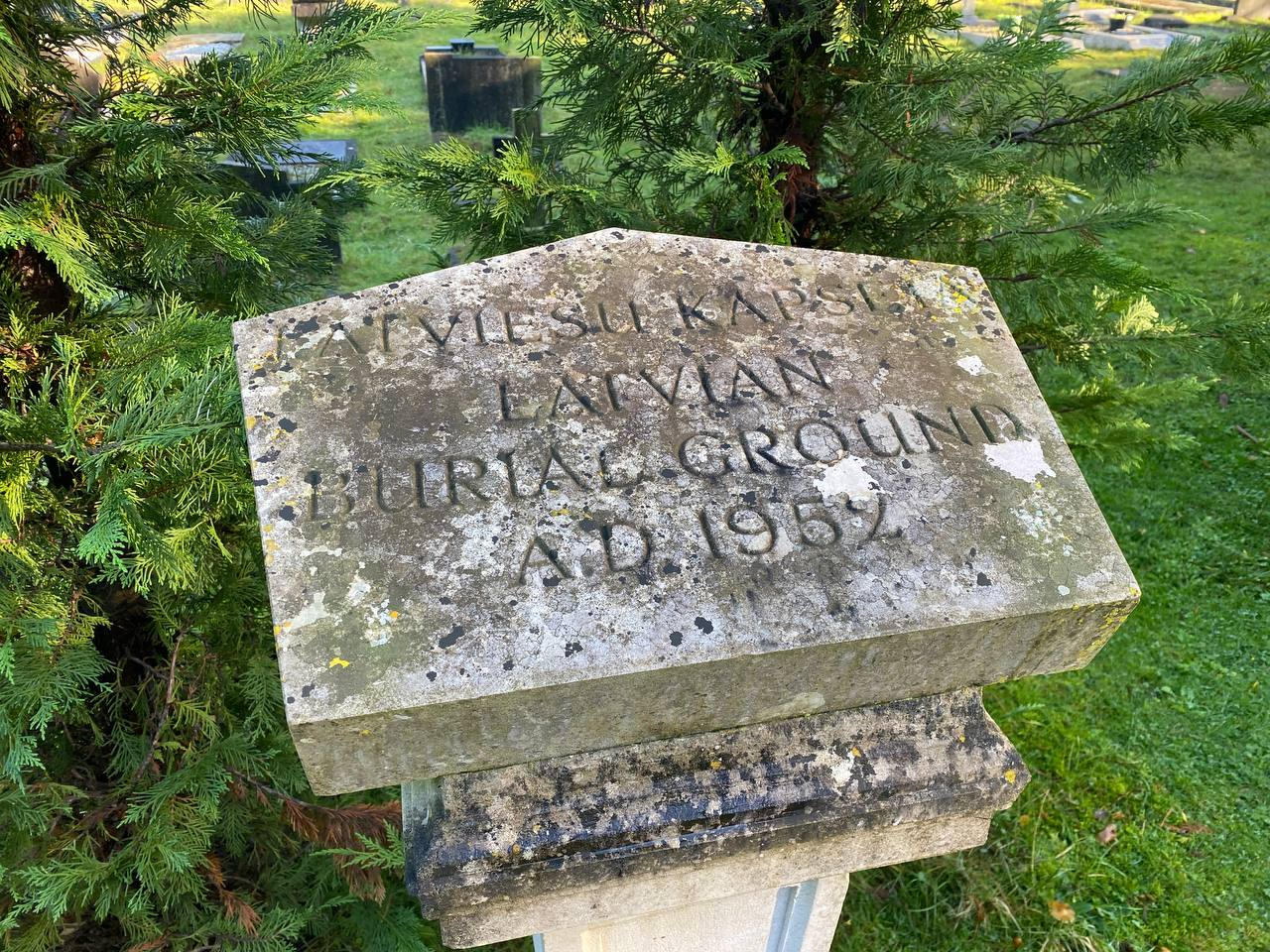
Entrance to the Latvian burial ground

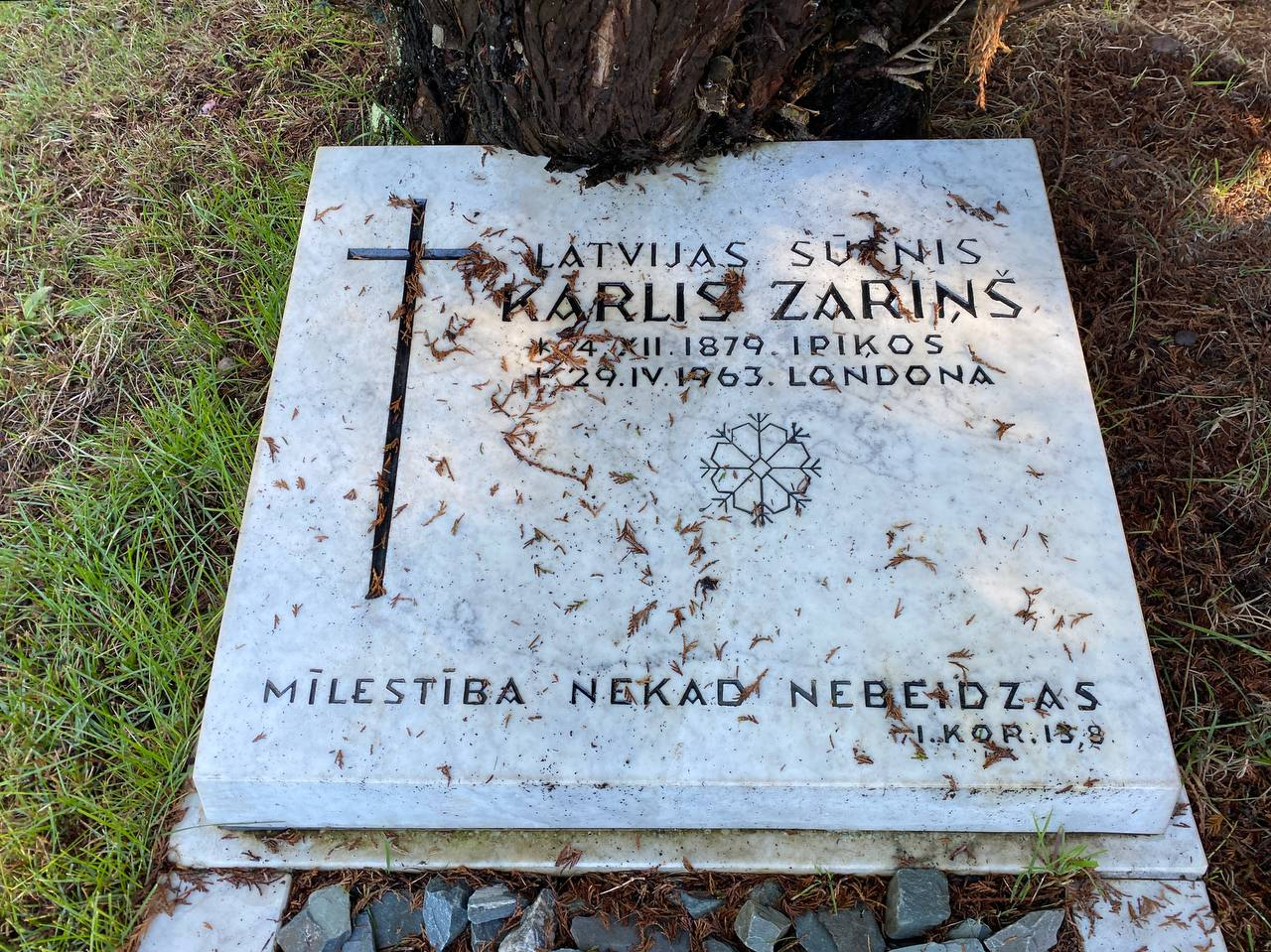
Grave of diplomat Kārlis Zariņš, envoy and consul general of Latvia in the UK who headed the Latvian diplomatic service in exile

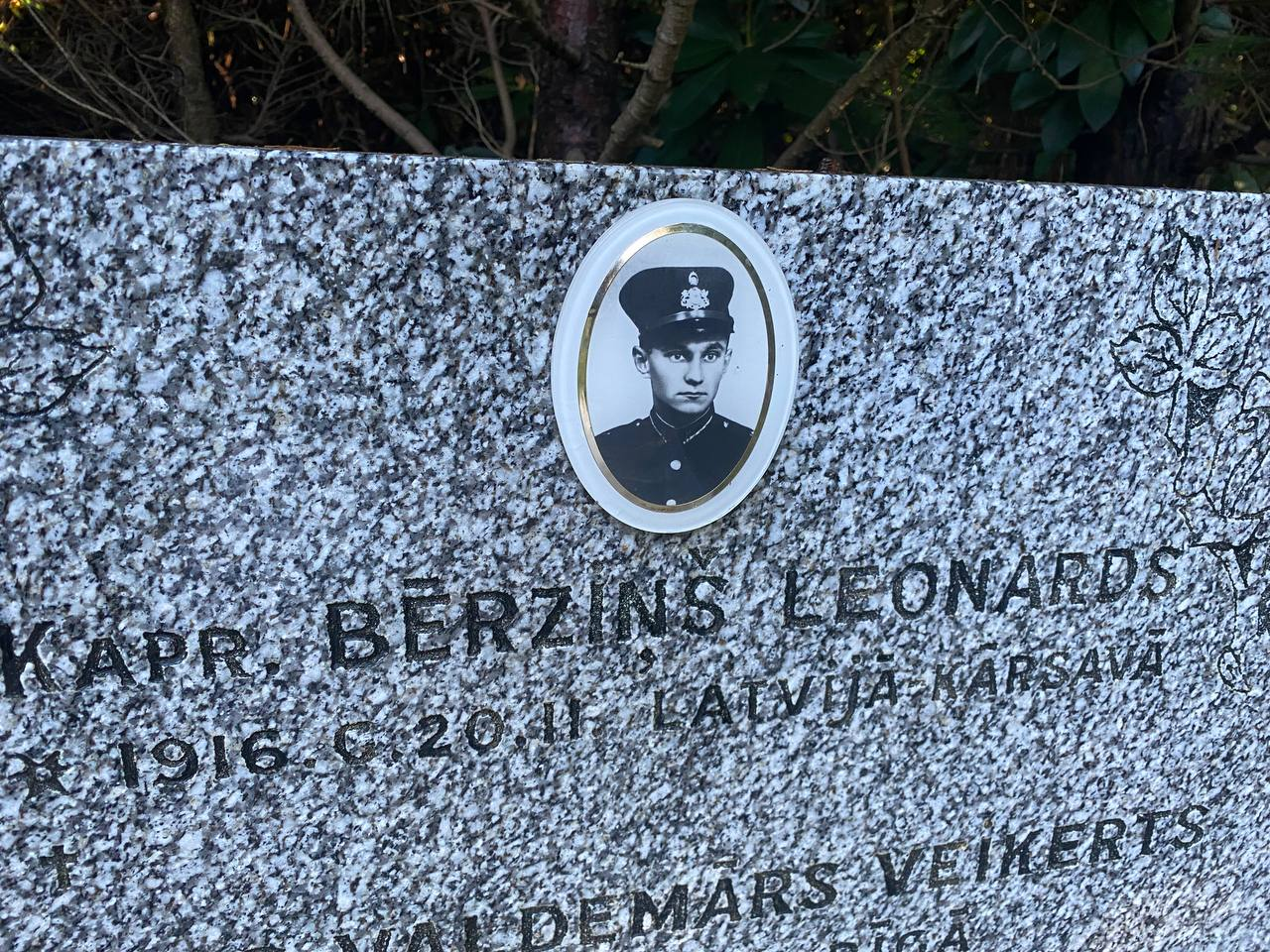

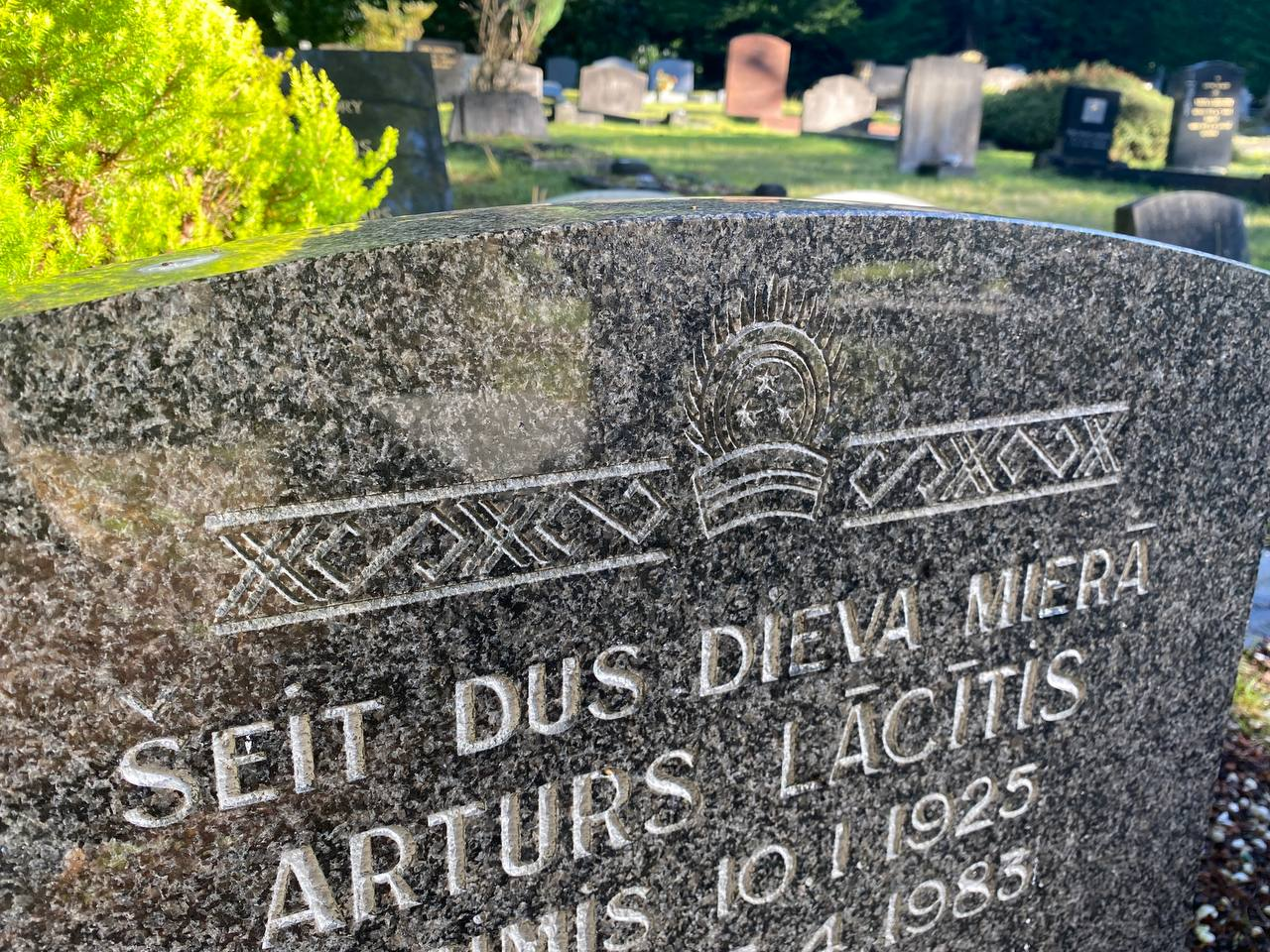

== Notable British people of Latvian descent ==
See Category:British people of Latvian descent

- Martin Blunos, TV chef
- Leonard Fenton, actor, director and painter
- Dora Gaitskell, Baroness Gaitskell, Labour Party politician
- Gustav Holst, composer
- Anatol Lieven, journalist and policy analyst
- Arnold Mikelson, artist
- Viktoria Modesta, singer-songwriter
- Imants Priede, zoologist

== See also ==
- Baltic people in the United Kingdom
- Estonians in the United Kingdom
- European Voluntary Workers
- Immigration to the United Kingdom
- Latvia–United Kingdom relations
- Latvian diaspora
- Lithuanians in the United Kingdom
- Siege of Sidney Street

== Bibliography ==
- Burrell, Kathy and Panayi, Panikos: Histories and Memories: Latvians and Their History in Britain
