= Estonian Diplomatic Service (1940–1991) =

Diplomatic service of Estonia in exile during Soviet occupation of Estonia

Republic of Estonia Diplomatic service in exile
- Flag of Estonia

- Coat of arms of Estonia

Agency overview
- Formed: 1940
- Dissolved: 1991
- Superseding agency: Ministry of Foreign Affairs (Estonia)
- Jurisdiction: Diplomatic missions of Estonia in countries that did not recognize the Soviet occupation and annexation of Estonia
- Headquarters: United States
- Agency executives: Johannes Kaiv; Ernst Jaakson

Estonia was occupied on 17 June 1940, by Red Army troops and was forcibly incorporated into the Soviet Union on 6 August 1940. The United States never recognized the illegal annexation of the three Baltic countries – Estonia, Latvia, and Lithuania – in conformity with the principles of the Stimson Doctrine (US Under Secretary of State Sumner Welles's Declaration of July 23, 1940), and more than 50 countries followed this position.

The Republic of Estonia, from 1940 through 1991, continued to exist as a state de jure according to international law during the whole period of its actual occupation and annexation. Therefore, some Estonian diplomatic and consular representations continued to function from 1940 through 1991 in some Western countries (the United States, Australia, the United Kingdom, and others), dealing with a limited part of state functions of the Republic of Estonia.

== Heads of the Estonian Diplomatic Service ==
- Johannes Kaiv (1940–1965)
- Ernst Jaakson (1965–1991)

In 1969, Jaakson signed the Apollo 11 goodwill messages on behalf of the Estonian nation, among leaders of 73 countries from around the world.

== See also ==
- Estonian government-in-exile
- State continuity of the Baltic states
- Embassy without a government
- Latvian diplomatic service in exile
- Lithuanian Diplomatic Service
- Baltic Legations (1940–1991)
