= List of ambassadors of Latvia to the United States =

The Ambassador of Latvia to the United States is the official diplomatic representative of the government of Latvia to the government of the United States. The ambassador and their staff are based at the Embassy of Latvia in Washington, D.C. The official title is His Excellency Ambassador Extraordinary and Plenipotentiary of the Republic of Latvia to the United States of America.

Prior to the reestablishment of Latvian independence following the illegal Soviet occupation of the Baltic States, Latvia was represented by the Chargé d'affaires of Latvia to the United States in Washington, DC who maintained continuity of Latvian diplomacy during the country's Soviet oppression. The United States consistently refused de jure or de facto recognition of illegitimate Soviet rule over the Baltics and maintained official diplomatic relations with the independent diplomatic missions of the Baltic states from 1944 until the Baltic states were freed in 1992.

== Ambassadors Extraordinary and Plenipotentiary (from 1992 to present) ==
- Anatols Dinbergs (March 11, 1992 (credentials presented) to December 1992)
- Ojārs Ēriks Kalniņš (1993–1999)
- Aivis Ronis (2000–2004)
- Māris Riekstiņš (2004–2007)
- Andrejs Pildegovičs (2007–2012)
- Andris Razāns (2013–2016)
- Andris Teikmanis (2016–2019)
- Māris Selga (2019–2023)
- Elita Kuzma (2024–)
