= Anatols Dinbergs =

Latvian diplomat

Chief of the Latvian Diplomatic Service
- In office 1 October 1970 – December 1992
- Preceded by: Arnolds Spekke
- Succeeded by: Georgs Andrejevs (as Minister of Foreign Affairs)

Ambassador of Latvia to the United States
- In office 11 March 1992 – December 1992
- Preceded by: Position established Himself as chargé d'affaires
- Succeeded by: Ojārs Ēriks Kalniņš

Chargé d'affaires of Latvia to the United States
- In office 1 October 1970 – 11 March 1992
- Succeeded by: Position abolished Himself as ambassador of Latvia to the United States
- In office 1953–1954
- Preceded by: Jūlijs Feldmanis
- Succeeded by: Arnolds Spekke
- In office July 1948 – 28 June 1949
- Preceded by: Alfreds Bīlmanis
- Succeeded by: Jūlijs Feldmanis

Personal details
- Born: March 2, 1911 Riga, Governorate of Livonia, Russian Empire (now Latvia)
- Died: 3 November 1993 (aged 82) Washington, D.C., United States
- Education: University of Latvia

Anatols Dinbergs (3 March [O.S. 2 February] 1911 – 9 November 1993) was one of the preeminent career diplomats of Latvia. He entered service in Latvia's Foreign Ministry in 1932. Dinbergs remained abroad when the Soviet Union occupied Latvia, serving in the Latvian Legation in Washington, D.C., after World War II ended. Dinbergs assumed the highest diplomatic post, that of chargé d'affaires, in 1970 and represented Latvia's sovereign interests in exile until Latvia reestablished its independence in 1991. As head of the Latvian diplomatic service abroad, Dinbergs was appointed Latvia's first ambassador to the United Nations and subsequently Latvia's first ambassador to the United States. After retirement, he served as Counselor to the Latvian Embassy in Washington, D.C., until his death in 1993.

== Background and career ==
With the upheavals of the Latvian War of Independence, the Dinbergs family fled Latvia, living as refugees in Vitebsk from 1914 to 1918.

Returning to a newly independent Latvia, Dinbergs' father, Alfrēds (1878–1941), was hired in 1919 as an engineer in Latvian Railways' technical directorate, later promoted to head its maintenance division. As a candidate for parliament, he was also elected to the Saeima from 1931 to 1934, representing the Railroad Workers' Association.

Anatols Dinbergs graduated from the Riga State Gymnasium No.1, from the French Institute, and obtained his degree in law from the University of Latvia.

Dinbergs entered service in Latvia's Foreign Ministry in 1932 while still completing his studies. His first post abroad was a junior position at the consulate in Łódź, Poland, from 1933 to 1934. From 1934 to 1935, he worked as correspondence secretary for the Western and Legal sections. In June 1937, he was appointed as assistant to the secretary in Latvia's New York consulate and promoted to attaché in September of that year.

Dinbergs declined to return home after the Soviet invasion of Latvia in June 1940 and was subsequently relieved of his duties by the Latvian SSR. With the emergency vesting of Latvian sovereign authority in the chief of the Latvian diplomatic service, Kārlis Zariņš (Charles Zarine) in London, the Latvian diplomatic corps continued to function in exile. U.S. envoy Alfrēds Bīlmanis, head of the Washington, D.C., consulate, promoted Dinbergs to vice consul in September 1940, then transferred Dinbergs to Washington, D.C., in 1941, where he served as diplomatic attaché and head of the consular section.

After the death of Bīlmanis, Dinbergs served as chargé d'affaires ad interim from July 1948 to 28 June 1949, when Kārlis Zariņš formally appointed Jūlijs Feldmanis to the post of chargé d'affaires of Latvia. Dinbergs continued on as first secretary. Upon Feldmanis' death in 1953, Dinbergs again served as chargé d'affaires ad interim until Arnolds Spekke assumed the position of chargé d'affaires of Latvia in 1954. Meanwhile, Dinbergs also completed graduate studies for his doctorate in political science at Georgetown University in 1953, defending his dissertation "Latvia's Incorporation Into the Soviet Union, 1940-1941."

With Arnolds Spekke leading the Latvian diplomatic service in exile after the death of Kārlis Zariņš in London 1963, Latvia's diplomatic and consular headquarters shifted to the Legation in Washington, D.C. Dinbergs succeeded Spekke on 1 October 1970 upon Spekke's retirement (Spekke died in 1972). Dinbergs became general consul to the United States in March 1971. Later that year, on 17 September, the Latvian diplomatic corps met in Paris and unanimously elected Dinbergs chief of Latvia's diplomatic service. Dinbergs led Latvia's diplomatic service as chargé d'affaires until the restoration of Latvia's independence.

The Latvian Legation in 1940-1991 did not maintain any contacts with the foreign ministry of the Latvian SSR. It received its first visitors from Latvia (representatives of Latvian Popular Front) in December 1988. After the independence declaration of May 4, 1990, Dinbergs established unofficial contacts with the new leadership of Latvia. That year he also arranged for the visit to the U.S. by Latvian prime minister Ivars Godmanis and foreign minister Jānis Jurkāns.

In the spring of 1991, a working arrangement was agreed to among the Latvian foreign ministry, the legation in Washington, D.C., and the unified foreign diplomacy service which had been formed. At Dinbergs' initiative, a policy meeting was held in Washington, D.C., on 14–15 April, also attended by Jurkāns.

The legation in Washington, D.C., played a key role in January and August 1991 when Dinbergs, together with Estonian and Lithuanian diplomats, apprised the U.S. State Department of the course of events in the Baltic states and their drive to independence. On 21 August 1991, the day Latvia regained its independence, he dispatched a telegram to Riga, congratulating the government on its "declaration of renewed State independence based upon the foundation of the 1922 Constitution," promising an even closer partnership between the legation in Washington, D.C., and the parliament and Council of Ministers to achieve their common goals.

Symbolizing that partnership, acting Latvian president Anatolijs Gorbunovs visited the U.S. and the Headquarters of the United Nations in September 1991. As of that September, Dinbergs was officially appointed both as head of Latvia's diplomatic service and as U.S. envoy.

In a letter to the Secretary-General of the United Nations of 6 September 1991, the Latvian government granted Anatols Dinbergs with plenipotentiary powers to represent the interests of the Latvian nation. Dinbergs was officially appointed on September 17, becoming Latvia's first Ambassador and Permanent Representative to the United Nations, having the honor of presiding over the first raising of Latvia's flag as a UN member. Dinbergs retired from his UN post that same year, on 5 December while continuing on in his positions of head of the diplomatic service and U.S. envoy.

On 18 September 1991, the Latvian government had also petitioned the U.S. government to promote the Legation to the highest rank of Embassy and to accept Dinbergs as Extraordinary and Plenipotentiary Ambassador. The U.S. acceded to the request, and so on March 11, 1992, Dinbergs submitted his credentials of accreditation to U.S. president George H. W. Bush. Bush expressed his particular happiness to see Dinbergs in this post, who for so long and so ably filled his duties, and that it was gratifying to work with such an eminent diplomat. Latvian diplomatic representation in U.S. during 1922-1948 had been vested in envoys, since the Latvian government only created the post of ambassador in 1991, Dinbergs thus became Latvia's first ever ambassador to the United States.

For the most part, Dinbergs' appointees abroad, in the U.S., France, Great Britain, Canada, Australia, and Germany, continued on in their positions in Latvia's diplomatic and consular services.

Dinbergs retired from active diplomatic duties in December 1992 and continued to serve as Counselor to the Embassy until his death, on 9 November 1993.

Dinbergs bequeathed his property to the Fraternitas Lettica, one of the oldest Latvian student fraternities, of which he was a member, to be used to fund a scholarship fund for Latvian students. The first scholarship given out by the Fraternitas Lettica Senior Association Anatols Dinbergs Fund was awarded to Aleksandrs Demčenkovs, a first-year student at the Riga School of Economics, in June 2005.

== Tributes ==
Dinbergs' services to the Latvian nation were acknowledged by Latvian foreign minister Māris Riekstiņš on 17 November 2007, as the Foreign Ministry returned its offices to its home at 3 Valdemara Street, Riga, where the MFA was located during Latvia's first period of independence (1918–1940).

This building embodies memories of both the founder of the Foreign Service of Latvia, Zigfrīds Anna Meierovics, and the legendary envoy Kārlis Zariņš, whom the Latvian government authorized to represent the Latvian state prior to the occupation years. [And] Ambassador Anatols Dinbergs, who as a young diplomat was stationed in New York, declined to return after the events of 1940, and worked during the many long years for our diplomatic service in exile, living to witness the renewal of independence in 1991.

== Legacy ==
Sandra Kalniete, foreign minister at the time, said the following of Dinbergs at the opening on January 28, 2004, of the exhibition "Latvijas valstiskuma sardzē: Latvijas diplomātiskā un konsulārā dienesta darbinieki okupācijas gados trimdā no 1940.gada 17.jūnija līdz 1991.gada 21.augustam" ("On Guard for Latvia's Statehood": Latvia's Foreign Service Staff in Exile During the Years of Occupation, June 17, 1940, to August 21, 1991):

In August, 1991, when Latvia had regained its state independence, the honor fell to me, as one of the senior Foreign Ministry staff, to receive Anatols Dinbergs' letter with the confirmation that he submitted himself into the service of the Foreign Ministry. I would ask you of the younger generation who have gathered here in this hall, to play in you minds, what that moment meant to Anatols Dinbergs, that he could hand in his letter of accreditation to the President of the United States. ...

Ojārs Kalniņš, Director of Institute of Latvia, who had participated actively in organizations of Latvian emigres in US in 1980s and in January 1991 started to work in Latvian legation in Washington, D.C., and later, in 1993, succeeded Dinbergs in the post of Latvian ambassador in U.S., said the following of Dinbergs at the above-mentioned opening of the exhibition:

Growing up in America, these Latvian diplomats were our heroes. Legends, who during the years of occupation embodied the Republic of Latvia in our minds. I learned Latvia's history from Arnold Spekke's and Anatols Dinbergs' books. We called Anatols Dinbergs our chief, but I also think of him as my diplomatic foster father and teacher. All that is the most important that I have learned about diplomacy, has come from Anatols Dinbergs. He has reached singular achievements in his lifetime. I would also like to emphasize that Anatols Dinbergs was not only Latvia's first ambassador to the United States, he was, in fact, the first Latvian ambassador in history (until Latvia's occupation in 1940 our country had emissaries; it was only with the restoration of state independence in 1991 that the position of ambassador was created -J.Ū.). The task of diplomats in exile was to preserve Latvia's sovereignty. Our diplomatic mission today is to preserve the Latvian state, so that no Latvian ever has to flee into exile.

During the ceremony of official unveiling of the new building of the Embassy of Latvia in the U.S. on March 1, 2006, in Washington, D.C., the President of Latvia, Vaira Vīķe-Freiberga, and Ambassador of Latvia to the U.S., Māris Riekstiņš, stressed the symbolic importance of the Embassy of Latvia in the United States. According to the President, Washington, D.C. was where the independence of Latvia continued, reminding the world of the Soviet annexation and occupation of Latvia. Ambassador Riekstiņš congratulated Dinbergs' wife, Mrs. Ruth Dinbergs, who was in attendance, in gratitude for Anatols Dinbergs' long-time service to Latvia.

=== Heads of Latvian Diplomatic Service in the West ===
Heads of Latvian Diplomatic Service (1940–1991) were vested with authority to represent the sovereign Republic of Latvia and its interests:

- Kārlis Zariņš, 1940 to 1963 (Envoy; Legation in London; UK)
- Arnolds Spekke, 1963 to 1970 (Chargé d'affaires; Legation in Washington, D.C., U.S.)
- Anatols Dinbergs, 1970 to 1991 (Chargé d'affaires; Legation in Washington, D.C., U.S.)

=== Latvian ambassadors to the United States ===
- Anatols Dinbergs, credentials presented March 11, 1992 to December 1992
- 1993–1999: Ojārs Ēriks Kalniņš
- 2000–2004: Aivis Ronis
- 2004–2007: Māris Riekstiņš
- 2007–2012: Andrejs Pildegovičs
- 2013–2016 : Andris Razāns
- 2016– : Andris Teikmanis

Latvian diplomatic representation in US during 1922 - 1948 was by the envoys, during 1948 - 1991 - by chargés d'affaires. The post of ambassador was created in 1991.

=== Latvian ambassadors to the United Nations (New York) ===
- Anatols Dinbergs, September 17, 1991 (credentials presented October 8, 1991) to December 5, 1991
- Aivars Baumanis, December 5, 1991 (credentials presented) - 1997
- Jānis Priedkalns, November 3, 1997 (credentials presented) - 2000
- Gints Jegermanis, May 12, 2001 (credentials presented) - 2005
- Solveiga Silkalna, August 6, 2005 (credentials presented) to ?
- Jānis Mažeiks, 2007 - 2011 and September 3, 2013 - 2018
- Normans Penke, 2011 - 2013
- Andrejs Pildegovičs, July 17, 2018 - 2023
- Sanita Pavļuta-Deslandes, August 22, 2023 - present
