= Diplomatic service =

Government bodies and personnel who communicate with the governments of other countries

Diplomatic service (or foreign service) is the body of diplomats and foreign policy officers maintained by the government of a country to communicate with the governments of other countries. Diplomatic personnel obtain diplomatic immunity when they are accredited to other countries. Diplomatic services are often part of the larger civil service and sometimes a constituent part of the foreign ministry.

Some intergovernmental organizations, such as the European Union, and some international non-state organizations, such as the Sovereign Military Order of Malta, may also retain diplomatic services in other jurisdictions. For non-state organizations, the reciprocation of diplomatic recognition by other jurisdictions is difficult, as diplomacy tends to establish the concept of recognition upon an assumed sovereignty over geographical territory; the SMOM, in this case, receives diplomats at its headquarters in Rome, as all permanent missions to the SMOM are jointly accredited as permanent missions to the Holy See. In relation, many more non-state international organizations, such as the IFRC/ICRC, maintain permanent non-voting observer status to intergovernmental bodies such as the United Nations General Assembly, appointing individual representatives to the observer office.

== List of diplomatic services ==
- European External Action Service (European Union)
- Indian Foreign Service
- Foreign Service of Pakistan
- Sri Lanka Overseas Service
- His Majesty's Diplomatic Service (United Kingdom)
- United States Foreign Service
- Latvian diplomatic service
- Estonian diplomatic service
- Vatican Diplomatic Corps

== See also ==
- Dual accreditation
