= EVW (disambiguation) =

EVW may refer to:

- European Voluntary Workers, the collective name given to continental Europeans invited by the British government to work in the UK in the immediate Post-World War II period
- Electronic Visa Waiver, an electronic documentation for the citizens of Kuwait, Oman, Qatar, and the UAE to enter the United Kingdom
- Empty Vehicle Weight, an Aircraft weight measurement
