= Andris Pelšs =

Latvian diplomat

State Secretary of the Latvian Ministry of Foreign Affairs
- Incumbent
- Assumed office 2018
- Preceded by: Andrejs Pildegovičs

Permanent Representative of Latvia to the European Union
- In office 2012–2016

Personal details
- Education: University of Latvia; Truman State University; Morehead State University
- Occupation: diplomat

Andris Pelšs is a Latvian diplomat who served as Permanent Representative of Latvia to the European Union from 2012 to 2016, since 2018 he serves as State Secretary of the Latvian Ministry of Foreign Affairs.

== Biography ==
In 1997 he graduated from Truman State University in Kirksville, USA.

In 2000 he graduated from the Faculty of History and Philosophy of the University of Latvia, and in 2003 received a master's degree in business administration from Morehead State University, USA.

Since 1998 he has been working in the Ministry of Foreign Affairs of Latvia. He held positions of Attaché of the Security Policy Division and later worked as Third Secretary at the NATO Division.

Between 2000 and 2005, he served as Third Secretary to the Permanent Mission of Latvia at the United Nations in New York and Second Secretary at the Permanent Representation of Latvia to NATO in Brussels. He also was head of the Arms Control Division and the International Operations and Crises Division at the Ministry of Foreign Affairs.

Between 2007 and 2012, he was Foreign Affairs Advisor to the President of Latvia Valdis Zatlers.

From 2012 to 2016 he served as Permanent Representative of Latvia to the European Union. Between 2016 and 2018 he held the post of Under Secretary of State at the Ministry of Foreign Affairs. Since 2018, he serves as State Secretary of the Latvian MFA.

== Awards ==
- 2009: Third Class of the Order of Merit of Ukraine
