= Apollo 11 goodwill messages =

Statements left on the Moon in 1969 by the Apollo 11 astronauts

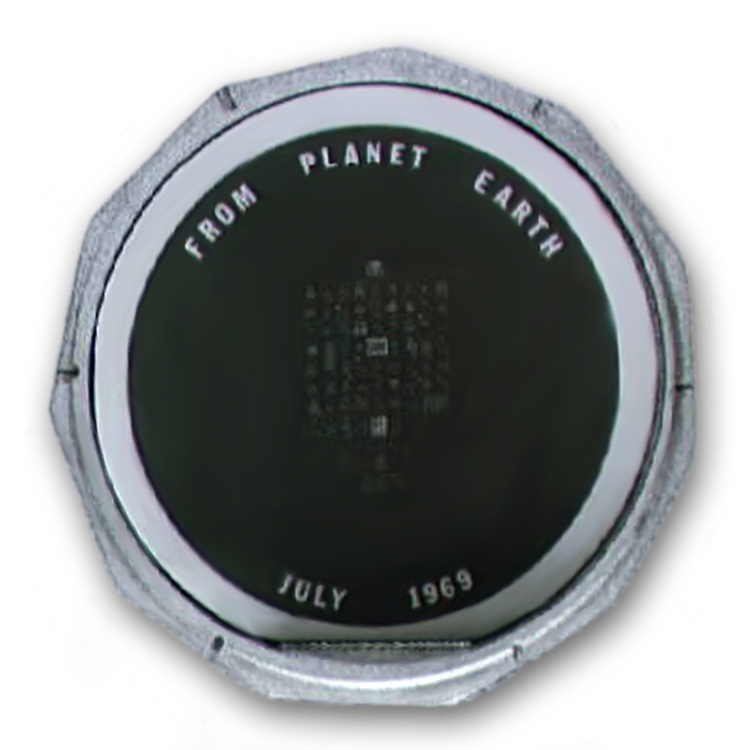
The silicon disc with goodwill messages left on the Moon by Apollo 11 astronaut Buzz Aldrin

The Apollo 11 goodwill messages are statements from leaders of 73 countries around the world on a disc about the size of a 50-cent piece made of silicon that was left on the Moon in 1969 by the Apollo 11 astronauts.

The disc also carried names of the leadership of the Congress, the four committees of the House and Senate responsible for legislation related to the National Aeronautics and Space Administration (NASA), and NASA's top management, including past administrators and deputy administrators.

At the top of the disc is the inscription: "Goodwill messages from around the world brought to the Moon by the astronauts of Apollo 11." Around the rim is the statement: "From Planet Earth – July 1969". The collected letters were given to the GCA Corp in Burlington MA which used a reduction camera to make a negative photomask containing all the letters plus an inscription around its edge at its final size. This mask was given to Sprague Electric Company of North Adams, Massachusetts which imaged it onto a silicon wafer and etched the pattern into the wafer. NASA head Thomas O. Paine proposed the idea to the U.S. State Department, and corresponded with world leaders to solicit their messages. These were enshrined by being photographed and reduced to 1/200 scale ultra microfiche silicon etching. The disc rests in an aluminum case on the Moon's Sea of Tranquility.

The disc was in a package in Buzz Aldrin's suit shoulder pocket along with some other memorial items. He was reminded about the package by Neil Armstrong while ascending the ladder of the Lunar Module Eagle to finish their EVA. He then dropped it to the surface. Later Houston requested and received confirmation they had placed it.

== Countries represented in the messages ==
State	Signed by
Afghanistan	Mohammed Zahir Shah; King of Afghanistan
Argentina	Juan Carlos Onganía; President of Argentina
Australia	John Gorton; Prime Minister of Australia
Belgium	Baudouin I King of the Belgians
Brazil	Artur da Costa e Silva; President of Brazil
Canada	Pierre Trudeau; Prime Minister of Canada
Chad	François Tombalbaye; President of Chad
Chile	Eduardo Frei Montalva; President of Chile
Republic of China (Note: The U.S. maintained relations with the Republic of China as "China" instead of the People's Republic of China.)	Chiang Kai-shek; President of the Republic of China
Colombia	Carlos Lleras Restrepo; President of Colombia
Congo-Kinshasa	Joseph-Desiré Mobutu; President of the Democratic Republic of the Congo
Costa Rica	José Joaquín Trejos Fernández; President of Costa Rica
Cyprus	Makarios III; President of Cyprus
Dahomey	Émile Derlin Zinsou; President of Dahomey
Denmark	Frederik IX; King of Denmark
Dominican Republic	Joaquin Balaguer; President of the Dominican Republic
Ecuador	José María Velasco Ibarra; President of Ecuador
Estonia (Note: The US government did not recognize the Soviet annexation of the Baltic states.)	Ernst Jaakson Consul General of Estonia to the United States
Ethiopia	Haile Selassie I Emperor of Ethiopia
Ghana	Akwasi Afrifa Head of state of Ghana
Greece	Georgios Zoitakis; Regent of Greece (Note: Regent for King Constantine II)
Guyana	Forbes Burnham; Prime Minister of Guyana
Iceland	Kristjan Eldjarn President of Iceland
India	Indira Gandhi; Prime Minister of India
Iran	Mohammad Reza Pahlavi; Shah of Iran
Ireland	Éamon de Valera President of Ireland
Israel	Zalman Shazar President of Israel
Italy	Giuseppe Saragat President of Italy
Ivory Coast	Félix Houphouët-Boigny President of Ivory Coast
Jamaica	Hugh Shearer; Prime Minister of Jamaica
Japan	Eisaku Satō; Prime Minister of Japan
Kenya	Jomo Kenyatta President of Kenya
Laos	Sisavang Vatthana King of Laos
Latvia	Anatols Dinbergs Ambassador of Latvia to the United States
Lebanon	Charles Helou President of Lebanon
Lesotho	Leabua Jonathan; Prime Minister of Lesotho
Liberia	William Tubman President of Liberia
Madagascar	Philibert Tsiranana President of Madagascar
Malaysia	Unknown; the message is not signed. (Note: Sultan Ismail Nasiruddin Shah was Yang di-Pertuan Agong and Tunku Abdul Rahman was Prime Minister of Malaysia at the time.)
Maldives	Unknown; the message is not signed. (Note: Ibrahim Nasir was President of the Maldives at the time.)
Mali	Moussa Traoré President of Mali
Malta	Giorgio Borg Olivier; Prime Minister of Malta
Mauritius	Seewoosagur Ramgoolam; Prime Minister of Mauritius
Mexico	Gustavo Díaz Ordaz President of Mexico
Morocco	Hassan II King of Morocco
Netherlands	Juliana Queen of the Netherlands
New Zealand	Keith Holyoake; Prime Minister of New Zealand
Nicaragua	Anastasio Somoza Debayle President of Nicaragua
Norway	Olav V King of Norway
Pakistan	Yahya Khan President of Pakistan
Panama	Bolívar Urrutia Parrilla President of Panama
Peru	Juan Velasco Alvarado President of Peru
Philippines	Ferdinand Marcos President of the Philippines
Poland	Jerzy Michałowski Ambassador of Poland to the United States
Portugal	Américo Tomás President of Portugal
Romania	Nicolae Ceaușescu President of the State Council of Romania and General Secretary of the Romanian Communist Party
Senegal	Léopold Sédar Senghor President of Senegal
Sierra Leone	Siaka Stevens; Prime Minister of Sierra Leone
South Africa	Jacobus Johannes Fouché State President of South Africa
South Korea	Park Chung Hee President of the Republic of Korea
South Vietnam	Nguyễn Văn Thiệu President of the Republic of Vietnam
Swaziland	Sobhuza II King of Swaziland
Thailand	Unknown; the message is not signed. (Note: Bhumibol Adulyadej was King of Thailand and Thanom Kittikachorn was Prime Minister of Thailand at the time.)
Togo	Gnassingbé Eyadéma President of Togo
Trinidad and Tobago	Eric Williams; Prime Minister of Trinidad and Tobago
Tunisia	Habib Bourguiba President of Tunisia
Turkey	Cevdet Sunay President of Turkey
United Kingdom	Elizabeth II; Queen of the United Kingdom (Note: Also as Queen of Australia, Barbados, Canada, Ceylon, Fiji, the Gambia, Guyana, Jamaica, Malta, Mauritius, New Zealand, Sierra Leone and Trinidad and Tobago. Rhodesia, which unilaterally declared independence in 1965, also considered Elizabeth II as its queen, though it did not enjoy diplomatic recognition as an independent state by the United States.)
Upper Volta	Sangoulé Lamizana President of Upper Volta
Uruguay	Jorge Pacheco Areco President of Uruguay
Vatican City	Pope Paul VI Sovereign of the Vatican City State
Yugoslavia	Josip Broz Tito President of Yugoslavia
Zambia	Kenneth Kaunda President of Zambia

== See also ==
- List of time capsules
- Lunar plaque
- List of artificial objects on the Moon
