= Chancery of the President of Latvia =

The Chancery of the President of Latvia (Latvian: Valsts prezidenta kanceleja) is a state institution of the Republic of Latvia, located at 3 Castle Square in Riga. The task of the Chancellery is to ensure the organizational activities of the President of Latvia and has various structural units, and advisors to the President work in it on various issues. Various councils, commissions, and services also operate under the supervision of the Chancellery. The institution was founded in May 1920 under the name of the Office of the President of the Constitutional Assembly, from 1922 to 1940 its name was the Secretariat of the President of the Republic, the current name has existed since 1993.

== Heads of the Chancery ==
- 1921—1940: Janis Grandaus
- 1993—1994: Janis Eichmannis
- 1994—1999: Ivars Miller
- 1999—2006: Martins Bondars
- 2006—2007: Andrejs Pildegovičs
- 2007—2008: Eduards Stiprais
- 2008—2011: Edgars Rinkēvičs
- 2011—2014: Gundars Daudze
- 2014—2015: Aleksandrs Bimbirulis
- 2015—2017: Guntis Puķītis
- 2017—2019: Arnis Salnajs
- 2019: Laila Jurcēnas (acting)
- 2019—2023: Andris Teikmanis
- 2023—present: Gunda Reire
