= Māris Purgailis =

Latvian politician (1947–2022)

2nd Mayor of Riga
- In office 1994 – 9 March 1997
- Preceded by: Andris Teikmanis
- Succeeded by: Andris Bērziņš

Personal details
- Born: 24 February 1967; Riga, Soviet Union
- Died: 26 September 2022 (aged 55); Riga, Latvia
- Political party: Latvian Social Democratic Workers' Party

Māris Purgailis (8 December 1947 – 26 September 2022) was a Latvian politician. He was the mayor of Riga from 1994 to 1997.

Preceded by Andris Teikmanis	Mayor of Riga; 1994–1997	Succeeded by Andris Bērziņš
