= Lithuanians in Ireland =

Lithuanian in Ireland
- Logo of Lithuanian Association in Ireland

Total population
- 36,683 (2011)

Regions with significant populations
- County Dublin

Languages
- Mainly English; Lithuanian, Irish

Religion
- Mainly Roman Catholicism; Minority Lutheran, Judaism or unaffiliated

Related ethnic groups
- Latvians in Ireland, Lithuanian Americans, Lithuanians in the United Kingdom

Many Lithuanian immigrants arrived in Ireland during the 2000s, when the Irish economy started booming. According to the 2016 Census, 36,552 Lithuanians reside in Ireland, a 0.4% drop from the 2011 figure of 36,683. Approximately one third of them live in County Dublin.

== History ==
In the beginning of the 20th century, there was some immigration of Lithuanian Jews. Robert Briscoe, who served as lord mayor of Dublin from 1956 to 1957 and from 1961 to 1962, was son of Lithuanian a Jewish immigrants to Ireland. In contrast, the current immigration is of majority Catholic Lithuanians, as Lithuania contained few Jews in 2000.

In 1935, Feliksas Vaitkus, the sixth person who had a successful flight over Atlantic Ocean with a single engine single seat fixed-wing aircraft, landed in Ireland. Vaitkus flew his transatlantic flight with Lituanica II. Vaitkus had to fight the worst possible weather conditions and was helped considerably by hourly broadcasts from an Irish radio station. He learned that Dublin was fogged in, as well as all areas heading east as far as the Baltic Sea. He knew that he could not make it to Kaunas due to his low fuel supply, and being exhausted after a 23-hour struggle fighting the elements, he felt it was best to come down somewhere in Ireland. He spotted an open field in Cloongowla at Ballinrobe, County Mayo and came down, with the aircraft suffering extensive damage. He was lucky to survive and not sustain any significant injuries. Lituanica II was crated for shipment to Lithuania, where it was restored. Vaitkus made his way to Kaunas, by ship and train, where he was given a hero's welcome.

== Organisations ==
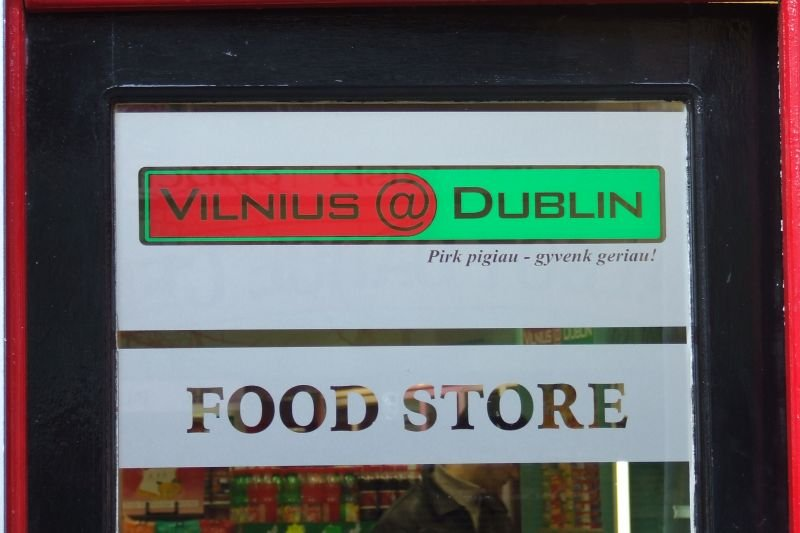
A sign in a Dublin store. Lithuanian text reads: buy cheaper, live better

The Lithuanian Association in Ireland Limited, officially registered in January 2005, has been active since 1999. The association organises Lithuanian concerts and other events in Dublin, Cork, Monaghan and Portlaoise.

== See also ==
- Lituanica
- Lithuanians in the United Kingdom
