= Latvia–United Kingdom relations =

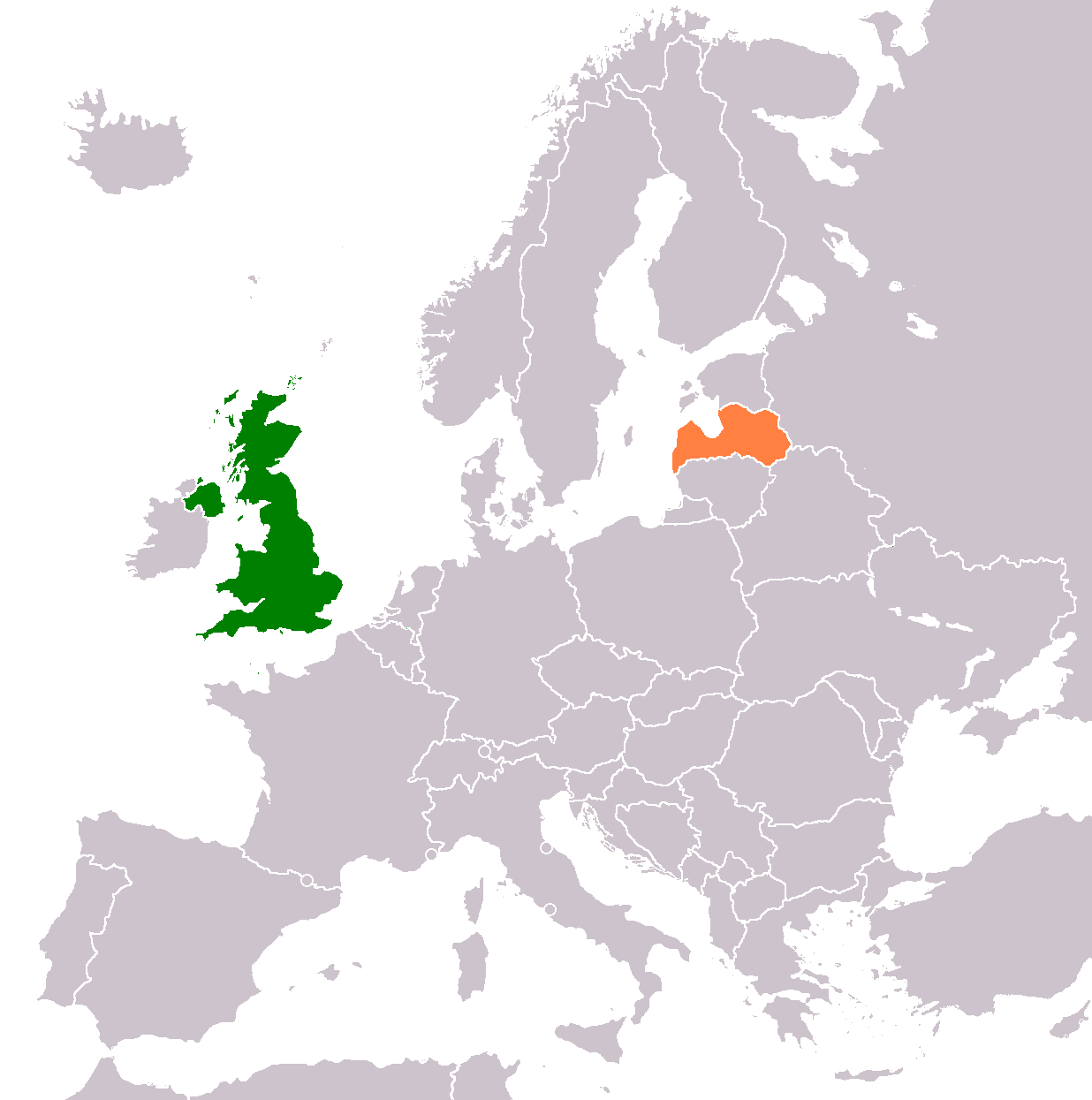

- United Kingdom: Latvia

Latvia–United Kingdom relations are foreign relations between the United Kingdom and Latvia. Both are full members of the Council of Europe, NATO and Joint Expeditionary Force. The United Kingdom gave full support to Latvia's applications for membership in the European Union and NATO.

== History ==
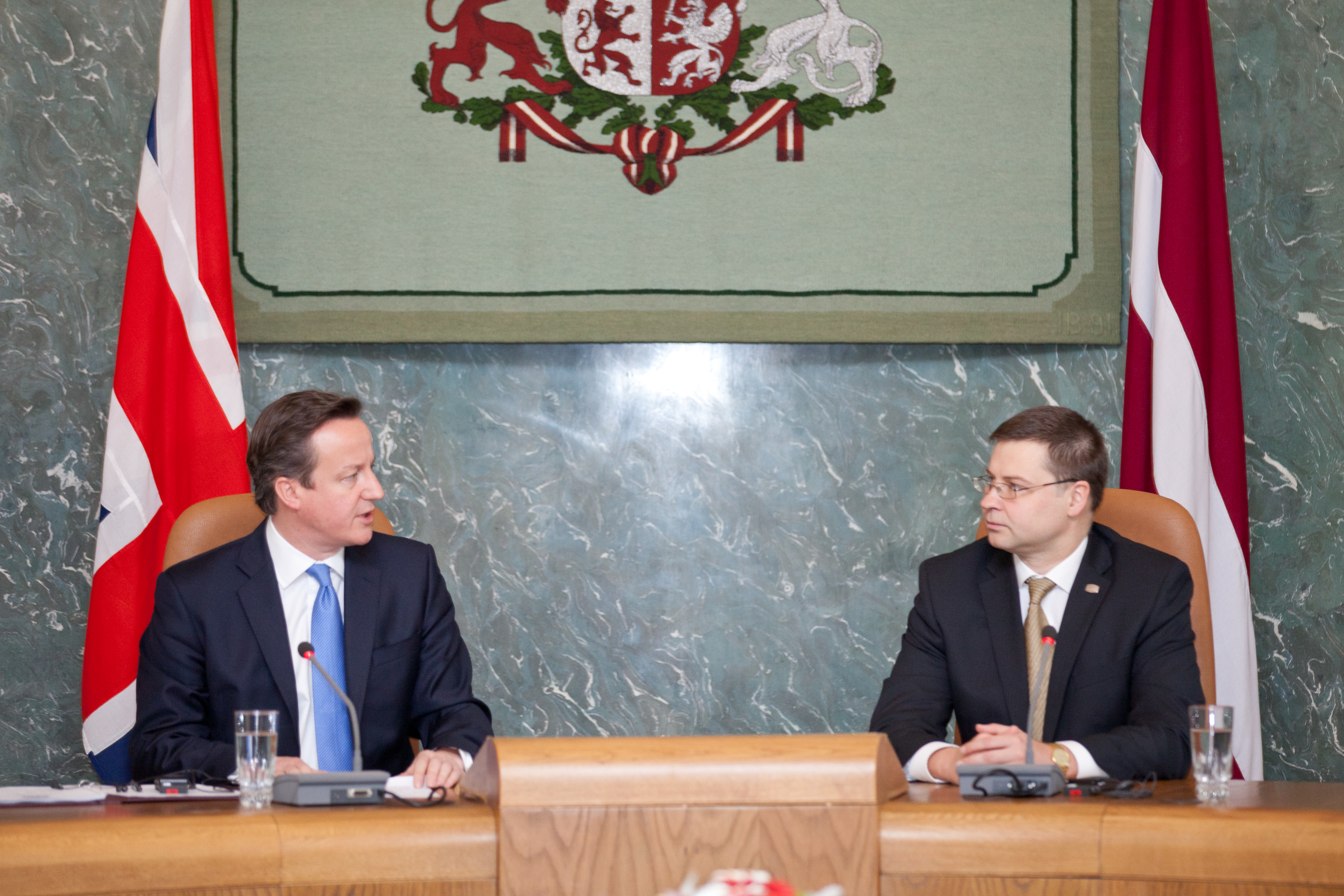
Prime Minister David Cameron with Latvian Prime Minister Valdis Dombrovskis in Riga, February 2013.

The United Kingdom never de jure recognised the Soviet occupation of Latvia in 1940. Latvia continued diplomatic relations with the UK in exile and later claimed state continuity. UK affirmed Latvia's restored independence on 27 August 1991. Latvia re-established the diplomatic mission to the United Kingdom on 5 September 1991. Both Latvia and the United Kingdom provided contributions to the NATO mission in Afghanistan.

== Diplomacy ==
Queen Elizabeth II of the United Kingdom paid a state visit to Latvia in October 2006.

== Resident diplomatic missions ==
- Latvia maintains an embassy in London.
- The United Kingdom is accredited to Latvia through its embassy in Riga.

== See also ==
- Foreign relations of Latvia
- Foreign relations of the United Kingdom
- List of Ambassadors of the United Kingdom to Latvia
- Latvians in the United Kingdom
