= Arnolds Spekke =

Latvian philologist, historian, and diplomat (1887–1972)

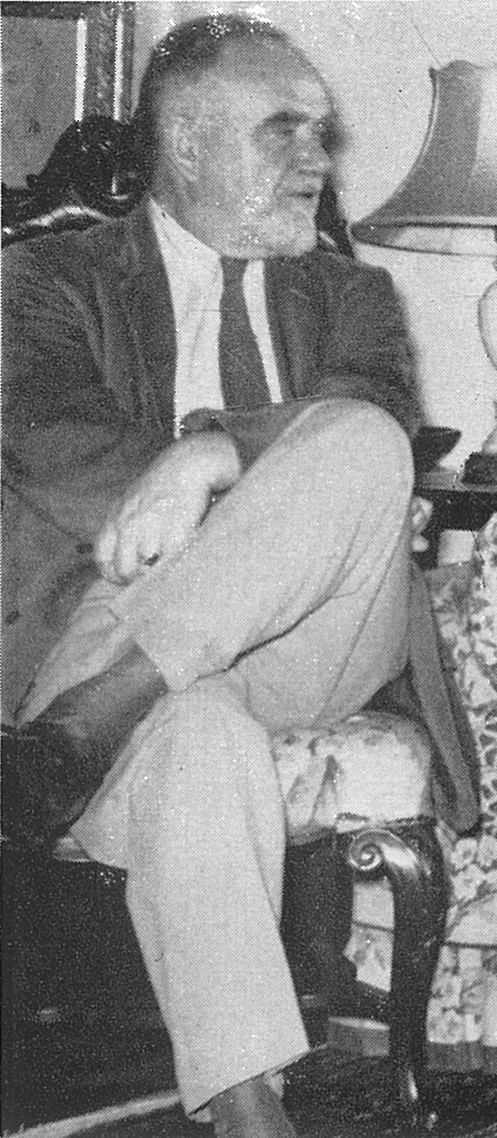

Chief of the Latvian diplomatic service in exile
- In office May 1963 – 1 October 1970
- Preceded by: Kārlis Reinholds Zariņš
- Succeeded by: Anatols Dinbergs

Consul general of Latvia to the United States
- In office 1954 – 1 October 1970
- Succeeded by: Anatols Dinbergs

Personal details
- Born: 14 June 1887 Vecumnieki Parish, Courland Governorate, Russian Empire
- Died: 27 July 1972 (aged 85) Washington, D.C., United States
- Education: Imperial Moscow University (1915)
- Occupation: Diplomat; Historian

Arnolds Spekke (or Arnolds Speke; 14 June 1887 – 27 July 1972) was a Latvian historian, philologist, and diplomat.

== Early life and education ==
Spekke was born on 14 June 1887 in Vecumnieki Parish, Courland Governorate, Russian Empire (now Latvia). He received a doctorate in philology from the University of Latvia in 1927. In 1932 he received a Rockefeller Foundation scholarship and studied in Italy.

== Diplomatic career ==
From 1933 to 1939, he was the Latvian envoy to Italy, Greece, Bulgaria and Albania with permanent residence in Rome, Italy.

On 27 July 1940, Spekke protested against the Soviet occupation of Latvia by handing over a note to the Italian government. On 9 August 1940 Spekke handed over his resignation, 11 August 1940 was his last working day at the Latvian legation in Rome. Afterwards he worked as a teacher, librarian, translator and other odd jobs in Milan and Rome.

From 1945 to 1950, Spekke worked for the Latvian Committee in Rome and 1951 he attended the founding meeting of the Latvian Liberation Committee (Latvian: Latvijas Atbrīvošanas komiteja). In 1951 Spekke published his History of Latvia, recounting the Baltic tribes and invasion by Vikings, Germans and Russians.

Beginning April 1954, Spekke was chargé d'affaires and head of the Latvian Legation in Washington, D.C. — beginning June 1954 he was also the consul general to the United States. Effective May 1963 Spekke became head of the Latvian Diplomatic and Consular Service. In 1970, Spekke retired from office.

Arnolds Spekke has received the Latvian Order of the Three Stars as well as French, Polish and Swedish orders. After World War II Spekke authored more than 15 important works on Latvian history and Livonian humanists.

== Personal life ==
Spekke married Aleksandra Stērstes. They had a son, Andrejs, born in 1915, and a daughter, Vija, born in 1922.

== Bibliography ==
- 1951: History of Latvia
- 1955: Latvia and the Baltic problem
- 1957: The ancient amber routes and geographical discovery of the Eastern Baltic
- 1959: Baltijas jūra senajās kartēs
- 1961: The Baltic Sea in ancient maps
- 1962: Some problems of Baltic-Slavic relations in prehistoric and early historical times
- 1962: Senie dzintara ceļi un Austrum-Baltijas g̀eografiska atklašana
- 1965: Balts and Slavs
- 1965: Ķēniņa Stefana ienākšana Rīgā un cīņas par Doma baznīcu
- 1967: Atminu brīži
- 1995: Latvieši un Livonija 16. gs.
