= Ojārs Ēriks Kalniņš =

Latvian politician and diplomat (1949–2021)

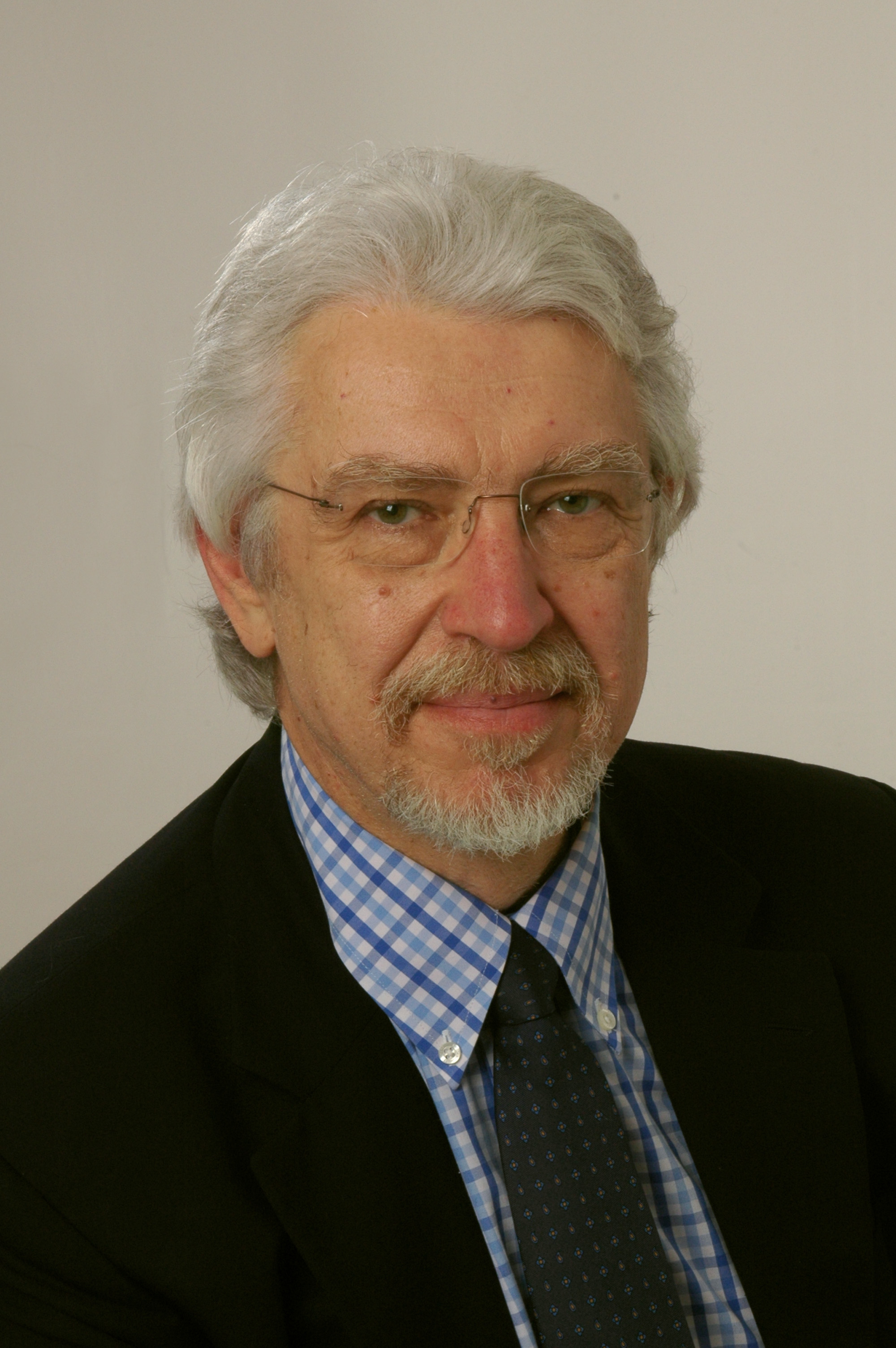
- Kalniņš in 2010

Member of the Saeima
- In office 2 November 2010 – 14 October 2021

2nd Ambassador of Latvia to the United States
- In office 1993–1999
- Preceding: Aivis Ronis
- Preceded by: Anatols Dinbergs

Personal details
- Born: 22 October 1949 Munich, Bavaria, West Germany
- Died: October 14, 2021 (aged 71) Riga, Latvia
- Spouse: Irma Kalniņa

Ojārs Ēriks Kalniņš (22 October 1949 – 14 October 2021) was a Latvian politician and diplomat who served as a member of the Saeima (2010–2021), head of the Latvian Institute (1999–2010), and as Ambassador to the United States (1993–1999). Born in a displaced person's camp in Germany to parents escaping the Soviet occupation of Latvia, he spent his early career working for various Latvian-American organizations before moving to Latvia and taking part in the restoration of Latvian independence. In 1998, he was awarded the Order of the Three Stars.

== Early life and education ==
Ojārs Ēriks Kalniņš was born on October 22, 1949, in a displaced persons camp in Munich, Germany. His family moved to Chicago in 1951, where he lived until 1985. In 1975, he earned a bachelor's degree from the department of philosophy at Roosevelt University. While living in Chicago, he worked as creative director for an advertising agency, served as editor and political adviser for the Chicago Latvian Newsletter, and wrote comedy for WXRT radio.

== Restoration of Latvian independence ==
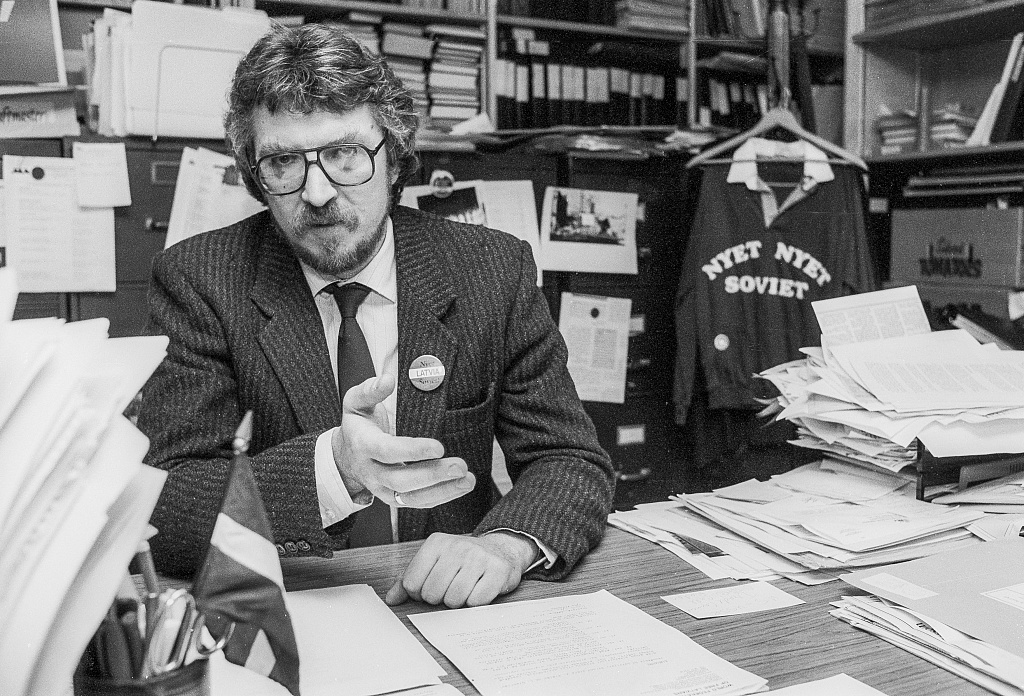
Kalniņš in 1988 as spokesman for the American Latvian Association

In 1985, Kalniņš moved to Washington DC and began serving as the public information director of the American Latvian Association, a position he held until 1990. In 1986, he led the US Latvian delegation to the Chautauqua Conference in Jūrmala, Latvia. According to Kalniņš, he and other Latvian-American representatives considered leaving the five-day conference early due to threats by Soviet security officials. From 1988 to 1990, he worked as a consultant for the Popular Front of Latvia and the Latvian National Independence Movement, and from 1990 to 1991 he was a contributor to the newspaper Diena.

After the Supreme Soviet of the Latvian SSR declared restoration of independence of the Republic of Latvia in May 1990, Kalniņš began serving as an advisor for the Ministry of Foreign Affairs of Latvia, helping to organize a meeting between Latvian Prime Minister Ivars Godmanis, Foreign Minister Jānis Jurkāns, and United States President George H. W. Bush in Washington, D.C. in July. In January 1991 he was appointed press secretary at the Ministry of Foreign Affairs.

== Diplomatic career ==
In September 1991, Kalniņš began work at the Embassy of Latvia in Washington DC, where he served as both the Ambassador’s authorised officer and as authorised officer of Latvia’s representative to the United Nations.

In 1993, Kalniņš was appointed Ambassador Extraordinary and Plenipotentiary of Latvia to the U.S. and Mexico. During his tenure as ambassador, he focused on the withdrawal of Russian military forces from former Soviet bases in Latvian territory, as well as the strengthening of US and Latvian relations. In 1994, Kalniņš greeted Bill Clinton at Rīga airport when he became the first United States president to visit a Baltic country on his way to a G7 meeting in Italy. In 1998, Clinton signed the US-Baltic Charter, which paved the way for Latvia's admission into NATO in 2004. Kalniņš called the signing of the charter, "a culmination of the last six years of the extraordinary U.S.-Baltic relationship since independence."

== Latvian Institute ==
After ending his tenure as Ambassador the United States in 1999, Kalniņs became the director of the Latvian Institute, succeeding Vaira Viķe-Freiberga after she was elected President of Latvia. According to Kalniņš, his goal was for the agency to become "an all-purpose ad agency for Latvia." In a 2002 interview, Kalniņš explained that the institute's goal was not to create an image for Latvia, but to present elements of Latvian culture to a foreign audience in an understandable way. In 2009, Kalniņš threatened to resign as director when the government planned to reorganize the institute and reduce its budget from 90,000 to 21,000 lats per year, saying that "an institute is not two people in a basement."

== Political career ==
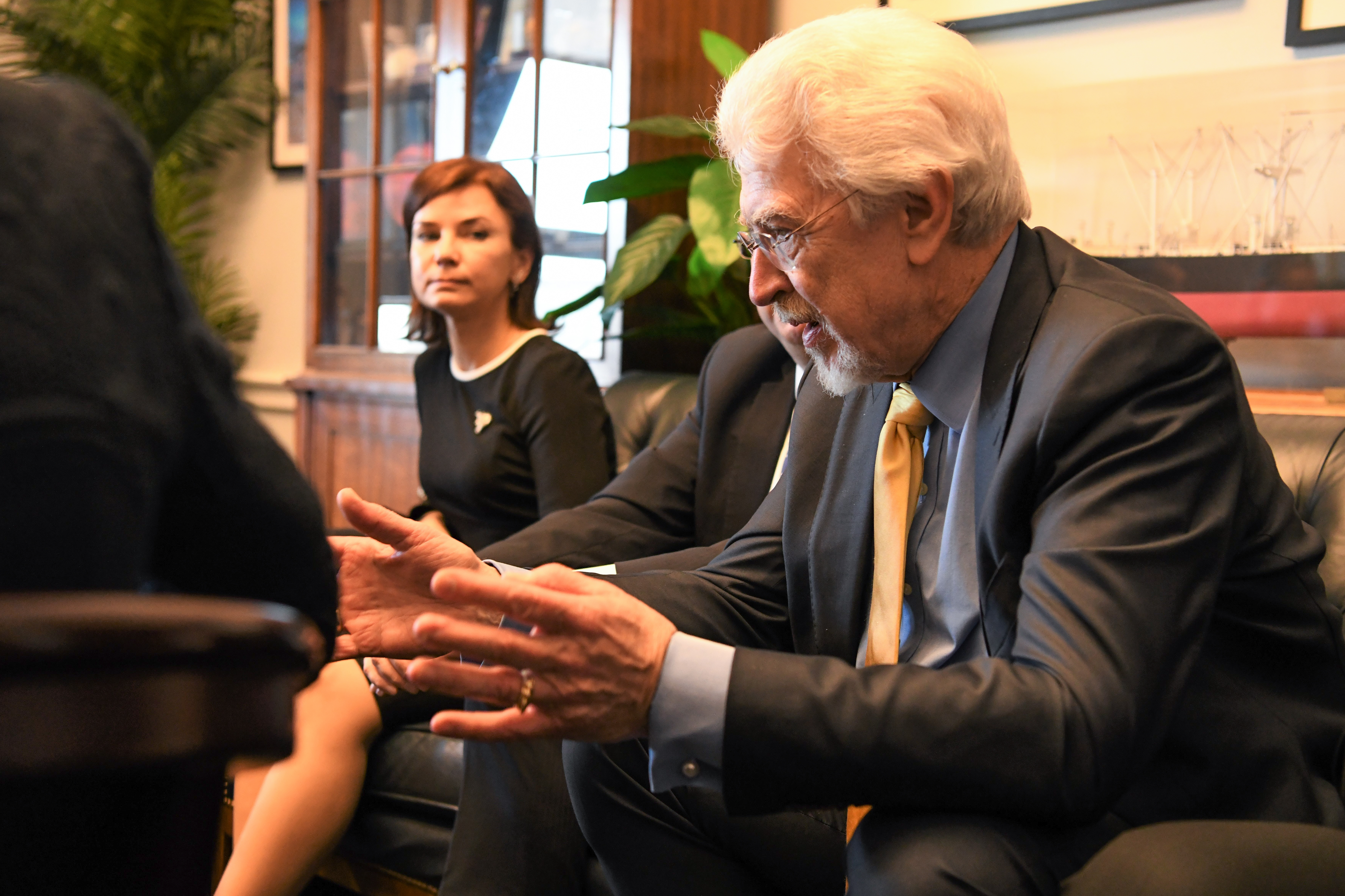
Kalniņš in 2020 on a visit to US Congress by Latvian and Estonian parliamentarians

In 2010, Ojārs Ēriks Kalniņš was elected to the 10th Saeima as a member of the Civic Union party. After Civic Union merged with New Era Party and Society for Political Change to form the Unity party, Kalniņš became a member of Unity and was re-elected to the 11th and 12th Saeimas. He became a member of New Unity after Unity changed its name, and was elected to the 13th Saeima in October 2018.

== Personal life ==
Kalniņš married Irma Kalniņa in 1996. They had first spoken when he was working at the Latvian embassy in America in 1992. Latvia was an independent country and Irma told him of the Latvian Renaissance campaign to supply medicines to Latvia because Russia had stopped supplying them. They were both enthusiastic about Latvia. Despite both of them having their own families they began living together and Ojārs became the Latvian ambassador to America in 1993. They married on 20 February 1996 receiving congratulations from Hillary Clinton and from Bill Clinton.
