= Ernst Jaakson =

Estonian ambassador (1905–1998)

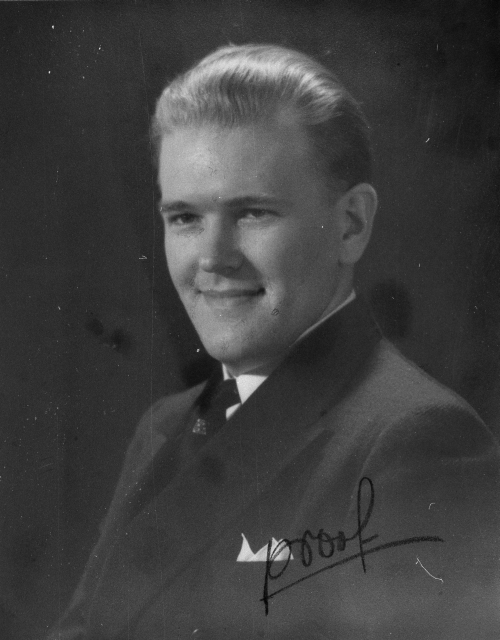

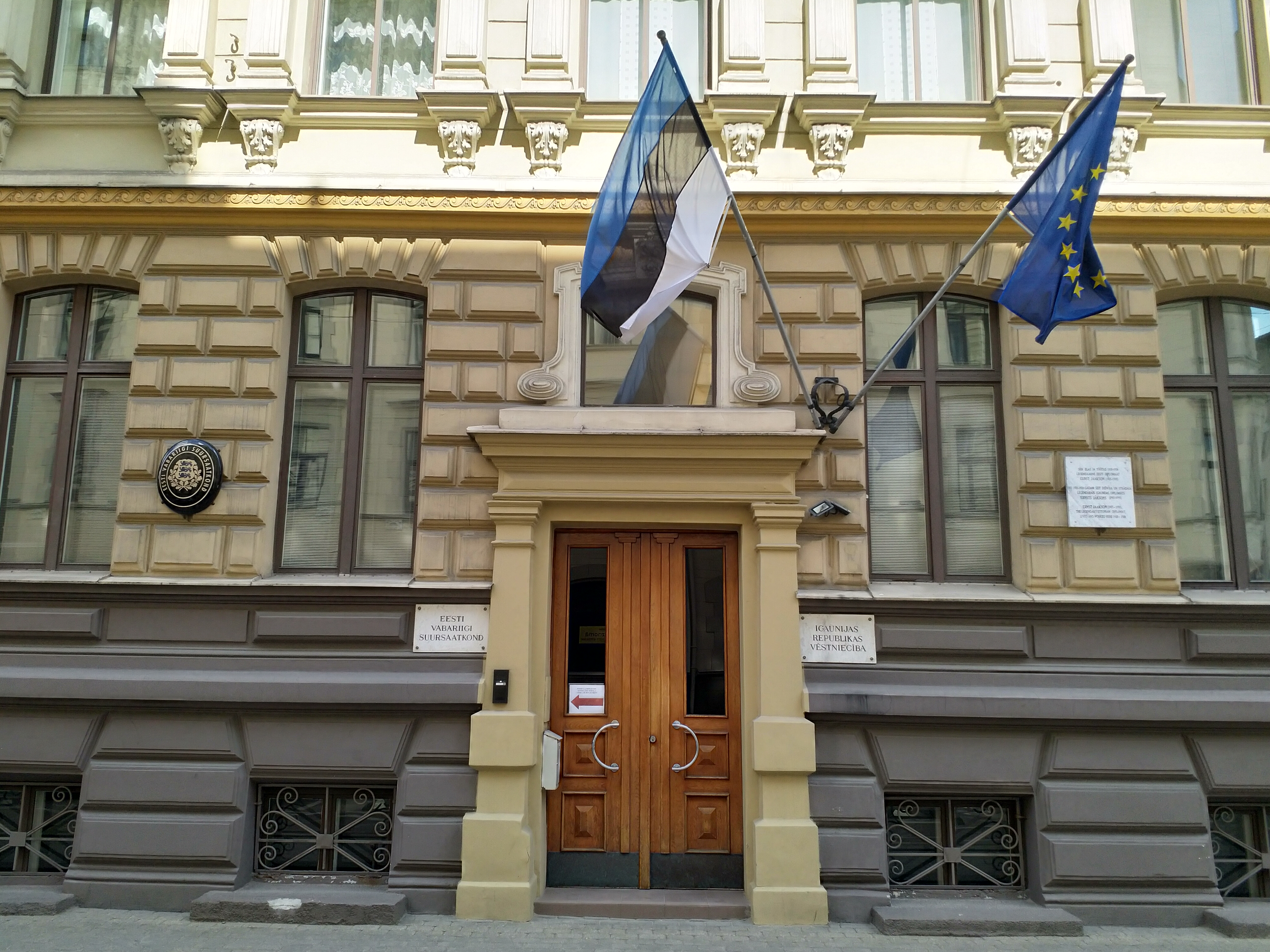
Memorial plaque to Ernst Jaakson on the Estonian embassy in Riga, Latvia (on the right, 2021)

Ernst Rudolf Jaakson (11 August 1905 – 4 September 1998) was an Estonian diplomat whose contribution was to maintain Estonia's legal continuity with his uninterrupted diplomatic service for 69 years.

== Early life and education ==
Ernst Jaakson was born in Riga, Governorate of Livonia, Russian Empire. Jaakson studied economics at the University of Latvia in Riga and law at the University of Tartu. He later graduated from Columbia University in New York with a degree in economics.

== Diplomatic career ==
In 1919, Jaakson began work in the legation of newly independent Estonia in Riga. In 1928, he started work in the Information Division of the Estonian Ministry of Foreign Affairs. From 1929 to 1932, Jaakson worked as the secretary of the Estonian honorary consul in San Francisco. In 1932, he was assigned to the Estonian Consulate General in New York.

When the Soviet Union occupied Estonia in 1940 and again in 1944, the United States and other democratic nations invoked the Stimson Doctrine, did not recognize the legality of Soviet annexation of Estonia, and continued to recognize the diplomatic representatives of the Republic of Estonia. In 1965, when his predecessor, Johannes Kaiv, died, Jaakson became the consul in charge of the legation. Thus, he was the chief diplomatic representative of Estonia in the United States until Estonia regained independence in 1991.

In 1969, he issued a statement for Estonia to the Apollo 11 goodwill messages. Throughout much of the 1980s, Jaakson, as the longest-serving foreign diplomatic representative to the United States, held the position of unofficial "dean" of the Diplomatic Corps. During the long years of the Soviet occupation when the Baltic states' representatives in the West were often the object of curiosity or humorous dismissal, Jaakson commanded near-universal respect, and he did so not peremptorily but by his personal authority.

In 1991, Jaakson was appointed Estonia's ambassador to the United States and Estonia's permanent representative to the United Nations. From 1993, Jaakson continued his work as the Estonian consul general in New York. Jaakson died in New York on 4 September 1998, aged 92.

== Autobiography ==
In 1995, Ernst Jaakson's autobiographical book Eestile (For Estonia) was published, which deals not only with his life, but also gives a very good overview of the diplomatic developments that took place over the years. He died in New York in 1998, at the age of 93. He worked in the Estonian Foreign Service for 79 years and served as a diplomat for 69 years.

== Legacy ==
In 2025, a block of 34th Street in New York was named Ernst Jaakson Way in honor of Jaakson.

Diplomatic posts
Preceded by Johannes Kaiv	Consul General of Estonia to the United States; 1965–1991	Succeeded by Sten Schwede
Preceded by none	Permanent Representative of Estonia to the United Nations; 1991–1994	Succeeded by Trivimi Velliste
