= Kārlis Reinholds Zariņš =

Latvian diplomat (1879–1963)

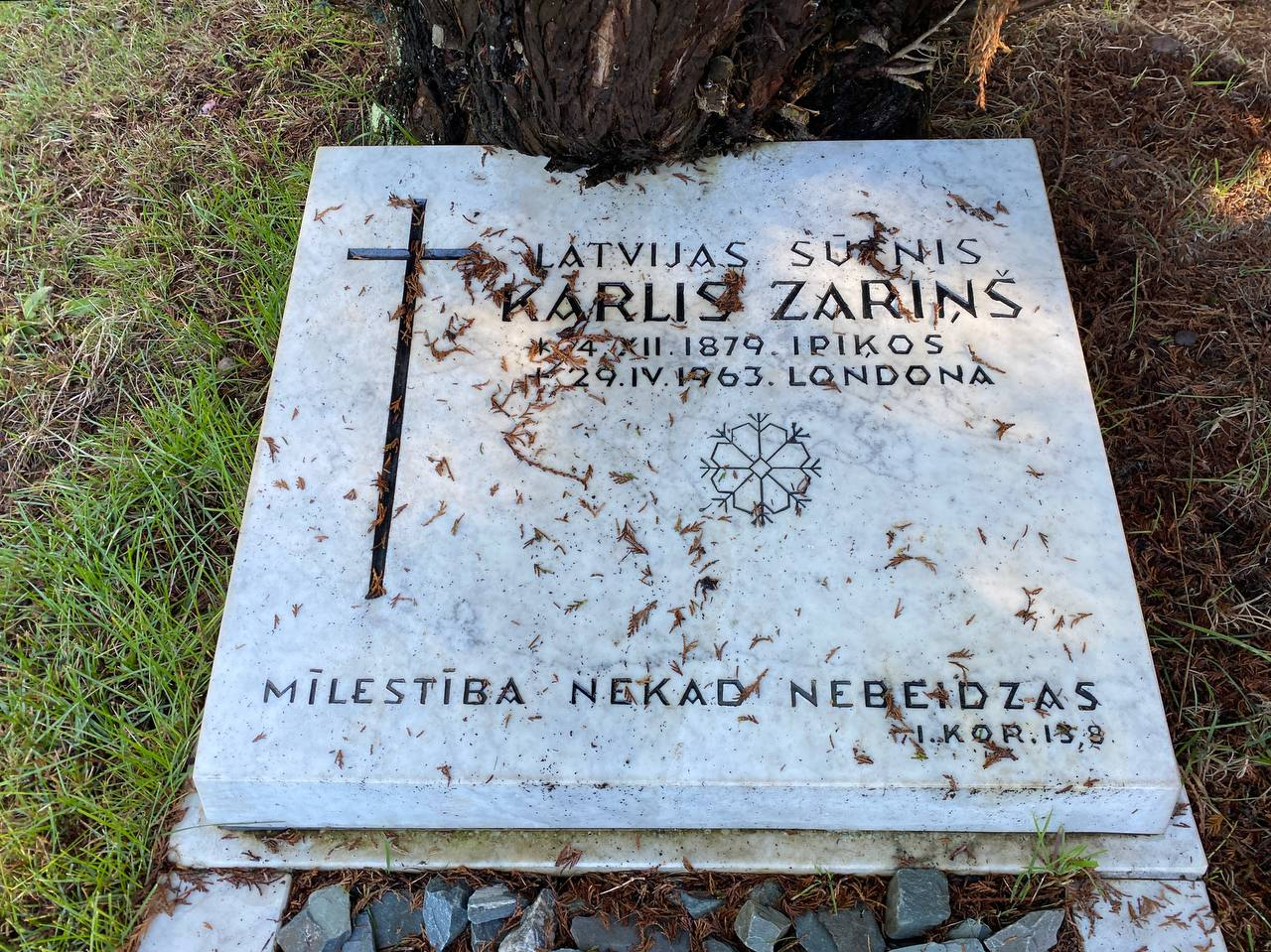
- Grave of Kārlis Zariņš at the Latvian burial grounds of the Brookwood Cemetery near London

Chief of the Latvian diplomatic service
- In office 17 May 1940 – 29 April 1963
- Preceded by: Position established (Vilhelms Munters as Minister of Foreign Affairs)
- Succeeded by: Arnolds Spekke

Consul-General of Latvia to the United Kingdom

Personal details
- Born: 4 December 1879 Ipiķi Parish, Governorate of Livonia, Russian Empire (now Latvia)
- Died: 29 April 1963 (aged 83) London, United Kingdom

Kārlis Reinholds Zariņš (born 4 December 1879 – 29 April 1963), also Anglicised as Charles Zarine, was envoy and consul general of Latvia in the United Kingdom and head of the Latvian diplomatic service in exile. Shortly before the first Soviet occupation of Latvia, on 17 May 1940 the Latvian cabinet of ministers granted Zariņš extraordinary powers. He was delegated to supervise the work of Latvia's representations abroad in time of war or other extraordinary circumstance. He served this role starting from the Soviet occupation in 1940 until his death in 1963. Since then, Arnolds Spekke and later Anatols Dinbergs represented Latvia as chargé d'affaires until restoration of independence in 1991.

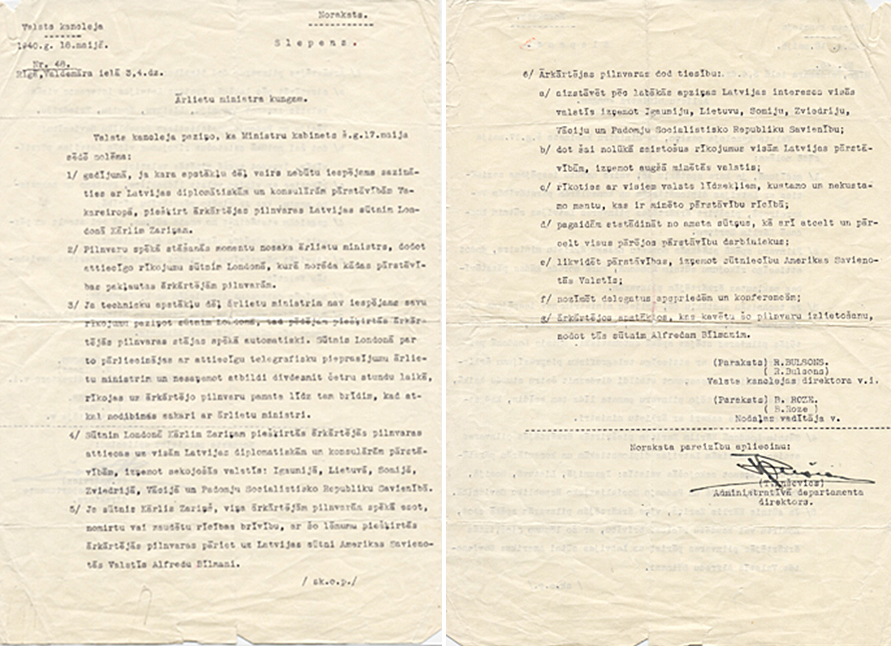
Letter from the state chancellery of Latvia on granting emergency powers to ambassador Kārlis Zariņš

Zariņš was authorized to:

- defend Latvia's interests in all countries (except Estonia, Lithuania, Finland, Sweden, Germany and the USSR);
- issue binding orders to institutions representing Latvia;
- oversee all property and handle financial resources of these institutions;
- relieve envoys of their duties;
- transfer or discharge employees of these institutions;
- close these institutions (except Latvia's Legation in the United States).

However, he never received an official order to use his powers. He only received a telegram from minister of foreign affairs Vilhelms Munters on 17 June 1940 stating: "Soviet troops are entering the country and taking control over the main institutions."

== See also ==
- Latvian diplomatic service
- Latvians in the United Kingdom
