= Rodrigo Kalniņš =

Latvian actor

Rodrigo Kalniņš (13 April 1883 – 22 February 1940) was a Latvian actor.

Kalniņš was born 13 April 1883 in Riga into a clerks family. He ended high school and began working as a railway clerk. In 1901 his long career within theater began, and from 1905 to 1915 he worked as an actor at both the Riga Latvian Theatre (Latvian: Rīgas Latviešu teātris) and the New Riga Theatre (Latvian: Jaunais Rīgas teātris). During World War I he worked with different theatrical ensembles in Vitebsk and Valka. In 1919, he returned to Riga and worked until 1935 at The Latvian National Theatre. Kalniņš spent his last years as manager of the Jūrmala Theatre.

In 1928 Kalniņš was awarded the Latvian Order of the Three Stars for his work for Latvian theater.

Kalniņš died 22 February 1940 in Riga, and was interred at the Riga Forest Cemetery.
