= Embassy of Latvia, Washington, D.C. =

Diplomatic mission of Latvia to USA

- Studio House
- U.S. National Register of Historic Places
- D.C. Inventory of Historic Sites
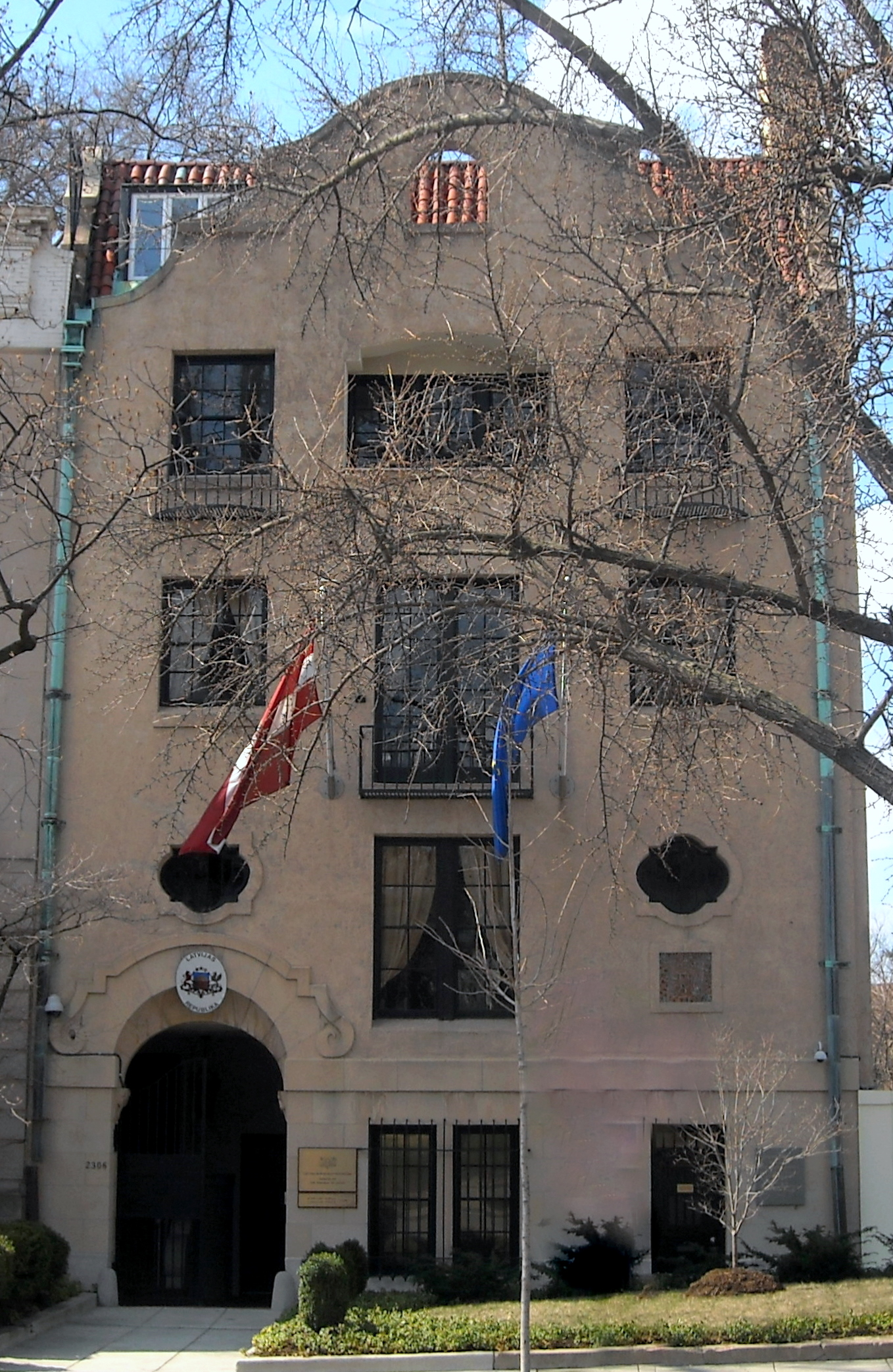

- Location within Washington, D.C.
- Location: 2306 Massachusetts Avenue, N.W. Washington, D.C., U.S.
- Coordinates: 38°54′42.5″N 77°3′4.2″W
- Built: 1902
- Architect: Waddy Butler Wood
- Architectural style: Spanish Colonial Revival, Arts and Crafts
- NRHP reference No.: 95000528

Significant dates
- Added to NRHP: April 27, 1995
- Designated DCIHS: December 15, 1994

The Embassy of Latvia (historically known as the Alice Pike Barney Studio House or Studio House) in Washington, D.C., is the diplomatic mission of the Republic of Latvia to the United States. It is located at 2306 Massachusetts Avenue NW on Embassy Row in the Sheridan-Kalorama neighborhood.

The current ambassador is Elita Kuzma.

== Building history ==
=== Alice Pike Barney Studio House ===
Designed by Waddy Butler Wood in 1902, the former studio house of Alice Pike Barney is an example of Spanish Colonial Revival architecture. It was used by Barney until her death and her daughters Natalie Barney and Laura Dreyfus-Barney held the house until 1961.

=== Smithsonian Institution ===
In 1961 the Barney women donated the house to the Smithsonian Institution. In 1976 it was opened as part of the National Museum of American Art to be used as a house museum. After more than 14 years the building had succumbed to significant structural damage. Since it would cost more than $2 million to renovate the house, the building was closed and the building and its furnishings were put up for sale.

The Friends of Alice Pike Barney Studio House was incorporated in 1993 to buy the house and pay for its renovations. Alice Pike Barney: Her Life and Art, written by curator of the house, Jean L. Kling was the subject of a book party to raise funds in 1994. The same year, the association attempted a working relationship with the Smithsonian Institution to preserve the building. Unable to raise sufficient funds, the house was listed for sale by the Smithsonian Institution in 1999 and the following years attempts to have the building zones for use as a School of Arts. Its ownership was passed to the Latvian government in 2001, with the intention of hosting events in memory of Alice Pike Barney and her art.

=== Embassy of Latvia ===
The renovated house is used as Latvia's embassy, meanwhile the residence for the Latvian ambassador is located in another area of Washington, D.C.

=== National Register of Historic Places ===
In addition to being listed on the National Register of Historic Places, the building is a contributing property to the "Sheridan-Kalorama Historic District" and Massachusetts Avenue Historic District.
