= Arnis Kalniņš =

Latvian politician

Minister for Economic Reforms of Latvia
- In office November 19, 1991 – January 12, 1993
- Prime Minister: Ivars Godmanis
- Preceded by: Jānis Āboltiņš
- Succeeded by: Aivars Kreituss

Personal details
- Born: January 24, 1935 Naukšēni Parish, Latvia
- Died: February 28, 2023 (aged 88) Riga, Latvia
- Party: Social Democratic Workers' Party of Latvia (LSDSP)
- Education: University of Latvia
- Profession: Economist
- ^{1}as Minister of Economics

Arnis Kalniņš (24 January 1935 − 28 February 2023) was a Latvian economist, academic, and politician. He served as the Minister for Economic Reforms of Latvia from 1991 to 1993, President of the Mortgage and Land Bank of Latvia from 1993 to 1996, and a deputy of the 7th Saeima. He was a full member of the Latvian Academy of Sciences (since 1987).

== Biography ==
Born on January 24, 1935, in Naukšēni Parish. He graduated from Rūjiena Secondary School in 1952. In 1957, he graduated from the University of Latvia, earning a degree in economic planning.

He became involved in the Awakening movement, in 1989 he was included in the list of intellectuals to be isolated. In the Council of Ministers of Godmanis, he was the deputy of the chairman of the council, Ivars Godmanis. From November 19, 1991 to January 12, 1993, he was the Minister of Economic Reforms. A. Kalniņš was the first president of the Latvian Mortgage and Land Bank (1993—1996). Later, he was an adviser to the bank.

He ran in the 7th Saeima elections and was elected from the list "Latvian Social Democratic Union". He was a member of the LSDSP faction. In the 1999 presidential elections, LSDSP nominated him for the presidency. In the second round, having received the smallest number of votes of all candidates — 14 — Kalniņš did not make it to the next round. Vaira Vīķe-Freiberga became president. In the 7th Saeima, he served in the Economic Commission, the Commission of Economics, Agriculture, Environment and Regional Policy, as well as in several sub-commissions. He also ran in the 8th Saeima elections, but the party did not make it into parliament.

Since 2005, Arnis Kalniņš has been an emeritus scientist in Latvia.
