= Irma Kalniņa =

American-Latvian politician

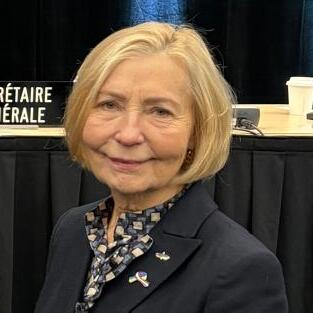
- Irma Kalniņa as a delegate to the NATO parliamentary assembly in 2024
- Born: Irma AIrma Anna Ferliņ; October 7, 1950 (age 75); New York
- Other name: Irma Johnson
- Education: Ohio University
- Occupation: politician
- Known for: politician
- Political party: New Unity
- Spouse(s): Mr Johnson, (married 1974–1996) , Ojārs Ēriks Kalniņš
- Children: three

Irma Kalniņa, born Irma Anna Ferliņa aka Irma Johnson by the previous marriage (born 7 October 1950) is an American of Latvian heritage who moved to Latvia in 1999. In 2022 she was elected the Latvian parliament.

== Life ==
Kalniņa was born in New York in 1950. Her mother had avoided being deported to Siberia with the rest of her family because the authorities were told that she was dead. Her parents were Latvian immigrants who had moved to America. Her father was a tailor and her mother could speak six languages. Irma's first language was Latvian and her parents gave her lessons in the culture of Latvia. She wanted to be a doctor but her father decided she wasn't clever enough and told her to be a teacher. He taught her about etiquette. She went to Ohio University, but she could not find work as a teacher. Her father decided that she was a secretary.

She was working in the Latvian embassy in Washington when Anatolijs Gorbunovs was appointed as an ambassador to the United Nations. She moved to New York to join his staff.

She had first spoken to Ojārs Ēriks Kalniņš when he was working at the Latvian embassy in America in 1992. Latvia was an independent country and Irma told him of the Latvian Renaissance campaign to supply medicines to Latvia because Russia had stopped supplying them. They were both enthusiastic about Latvia. Despite both of them having their own families they began living together and Ojārs became the Latvian ambassador to America and Mexico in 1993. They married on 20 February 1996 receiving congratulations from Hillary Clinton and also from Bill Clinton. They moved to Latvia in 1999.

Kalniņa is an expert concerning etiquette. In 2018 she was at the London Book Fair publicising her book "At the Table".

Her husband died in 2021. In 2022 she was elected the Saeima (Latvian parliament), where she was the secretary to the Saeima Foreign Affairs Committee.

In November 2024 she was in Montreal as a member of the Latvian delegation to the NATO Parliamentary Assembly.
