= Baltic people in the United Kingdom =

Ethnic group in the United Kingdom

Baltic British
Total population
- Baltic-born residents 108,711 Lithuanian-born (2011 census); 61,441 Latvian-born (2011 census)

Regions with significant populations
- London, Birmingham, Manchester, Liverpool, Kingston upon Hull, York, Kings Lynn and Glasgow

Languages
- English, Latvian, Lithuanian, Russian.

Religion
- Catholicism · Judaism • Protestantism

Related ethnic groups
- Balts

Baltic people in the United Kingdom are those born or raised in the UK, or residents, who are of ethnically Baltic, meaning Latvian or Lithuanian, origin.

== History, population and settlement ==
In the early 20th century, many Latvian and Lithuanian refugees began to settle in Glasgow and at its height in the 1950s, there were around 10,000 in the Glasgow area.

Significant numbers of Baltic people moved to the UK in 1947 under a government-backed scheme called Westward Ho. The first group of displaced persons (DPs) from the British zone of occupation of Germany arrived in the UK in 1947, called the Balt Cygnets.

The 2011 UK Census recorded 95,730 Lithuanian-born residents in England, 1,353 in Wales, 4,287 in Scotland, and 7,341 in Northern Ireland. The census recorded 53,977 Latvian-born residents in England, 692 in Wales, 4,475 in Scotland, and 2,297 in Northern Ireland.

The previous, 2001 UK Census, had recorded 4,363 UK residents born in Lithuania and 4,275 born in Latvia.

There is a Latvian section at the Brookwood cemetery near London.

== See also ==
- European Voluntary Workers
- Lithuanians in the United Kingdom

== Bibliography ==
- Burrell, Kathy and Panayi, Panikos: Histories and Memories: Latvians and Their History in Britain
- Budriuniene, Jolanta: Regeneration of the Lithuanian Emigrant Press: Fifteen Years' Experience
