= Johannes Kaiv =

Estonian diplomat

Johannes Kaiv (8 July 1897 – 21 November 1965) was an Estonian diplomat.

A graduate in law from the University of Tartu, Kaiv studied at The Hague Academy of International Law. A veteran of the 1918–1920 Estonian War of Independence, Kaiv was awarded the Military Order of the Cross of the Eagle, 3rd Class, in 1935.

Between 1935 and 1939 he was the Honorary Consul in Sydney, Australia. In the years 1939 to 1965, he served as the Consul General of Estonia in New York City, since 1940 in charge of the Estonian legation in the United States.

When the Soviet Union invaded and occupied Estonia in 1940, and again in 1944, the United States and other democratic nations invoked the Stimson Doctrine, did not recognize the legality of Soviet annexation of Estonia, and continued to recognize the diplomatic representatives of the Republic of Estonia. In 1965, when Kaiv died, Ernst Jaakson succeeded him as the consul in charge of the Estonian legation in New York City.

On 21 November 1965, Kaiv died following a heart attack at his home in Scarsdale, New York, and was buried in the Kensico Cemetery in New York. His wife, Salme (née Vornik, 1914–1999), was later buried beside him.

Diplomatic posts
| Preceded by Harald Tanner | Honorary Consul of Estonia in Sydney; 1935–1939 | Succeeded by Arvid Mielen |
| Preceded by Charles Kuusik | Consul General of Estonia to the United States; 1939–1965 | Succeeded by Ernst Jaakson |
