= Lithuanians in the United Kingdom =

- Distribution by regional area at the 2011 census

Total population
- Lithuanian-born residents in the United Kingdom: 182,423 – 0.3% (2021/22 Census) (Note: Does not include Lithuanians born in the United Kingdom or those with Lithuanian ancestry); England: 161,596 – 0.3% (2021); Scotland: 7,814 – 0.1% (2022); Wales: 2,562 – 0.08% (2021); Northern Ireland: 10,451 – 0.5% (2021); 144,000 (2013 ONS estimate); Lithuanian citizens/passports held: 185,159 (England and Wales only, 2021)

Regions with significant populations
- London (Redbridge, Havering, Barking and Dagenham, Waltham Forest, Newham) · Lanarkshire · Leeds · Northampton · Ayrshire · East Anglia (King's Lynn, Boston, Peterborough)

Languages
- British English · Lithuanian

Religion
- Roman Catholicism in majority · Judaism

Related ethnic groups
- Baltic people

Lithuanians in the United Kingdom (Lithuanian: Didžiosios Britanijos lietuviai) include individuals born in Lithuania who have migrated to the UK, among them Lithuanian citizens of Russian descent and Polish Lithuanian citizens, as well as their British-born descendants. The 2011 UK Census recorded 95,730 Lithuanian-born residents in England, 1,353 in Wales, 4,287 in Scotland, and 7,341 in Northern Ireland. The previous, 2001 UK Census, had recorded 4,363 Lithuanian-born residents. The Office for National Statistics estimates that 144,000 Lithuanian-born immigrants were resident in the UK in 2013.

Significant numbers of Lithuanians came to the UK after Lithuania's European Union accession in 2004; however, there have been historically notable Lithuanian communities in the UK since the early 20th century — most notably in Scotland (Glasgow and the mining communities of North Lanarkshire and Midlothian) and London. The East London suburb of Beckton became known by some as "Little Lithuania" and "Bektoniškės" in the late 2000s, due to its Lithuanian diaspora presence.

In Scotland, the first Lithuanians came during the latter part of the 19th century. Between 1886 and 1914, around one in four Lithuanians emigrated from Lithuania, with most of those leaving doing so in the 1890s and 1900s. Some of these emigrants were avoiding conscription into the Russian military, some were Lithuanian freedom fighters, others were Jews escaping persecution, and some were fleeing poverty. The Lithuanian population of Scotland is estimated to have grown from a few hundred to 7,000. An estimated 2,000 Lithuanians settled elsewhere in Britain during this period. Around 15,000 Lithuanians also resided in Scotland temporarily, before migrating onwards to other countries; most notably the United States. According to the BBC, some travelled to Scotland because they could not afford travel to the US, whereas others were duped, thinking that they had actually arrived in the United States.

The British Lithuanian community is experiencing a decline since the late-2010s, primarily due to increased return migration to Lithuania. From 2019 to 2024, more than 43,000 Lithuanian nationals have returned from the United Kingdom. This trend has been influenced by several factors, including the United Kingdom's withdrawal from the European Union, which introduced stricter immigration regulations, and the COVID-19 pandemic, which prompted many to reassess living arrangements and long-term plans. Family considerations are also significant, as returnees often wish for their children to grow up closer to relatives in Lithuania. Demographic data indicate that the majority of returnees are between the ages of 25 and 34, and many are families with young children. Economic developments in Lithuania have further contributed to this trend. The wage gap between Lithuania and Western Europe has considerably narrowed in recent years, making the domestic labour market more competitive and reducing the financial advantages of remaining abroad. As a result, social and cultural factors, such as proximity to family and integration into the local community, have gained greater importance in migration decisions.

== See also ==
- Lithuania–United Kingdom relations
- Baltic people in the United Kingdom
- Lithuanian people
- Lithuanians in Ireland
