= European Voluntary Workers =

European Voluntary Workers (EVW) was the collective name given to continental Europeans invited by the British government to work in the UK in the immediate Post-World War II period from 1946 to 1951, to help people who have become homeless during the war and to support labor shortages in industry. Programmes inviting staff include Balt Cygnet, which recruited Baltic women for nursing, housework and textile work. In spite of its name, Balt Cygnet also accepted applicants from Ukraine, Poland and countries in the Balkans, among others. Later Westward Ho! which recruited men for unskilled jobs in industry.

== Contextual background ==
At the end of the World War 2, Britain faced labour shortages in specific industries such as coal mining, agriculture and domestic work and an emigration problem in which skilled labour was leaving the country for Old Commonwealth nations.

The newly elected Labour cabinet's Foreign Labour Committee in March 1946 was in favour of bringing temporary workers in from Western Europe to alleviate this situation.

== History ==
=== The scheme ===
While the two schemes ran from 1946 to 1951, most came during 1947 to 1948. The first aspect of the programme began in October 1946 with the recruitment of women from the Baltic nations to fill domestic work jobs (of what would become the 'Balt Cygnet').

By the end of 1947, around 34,688 people (25,115 men, 9,573 women) had been brought in under Westward Ho, in addition to 1,800 women brought under Balt Cygnet. By middle of 1948 in June, 60,856 had been brought into the country in total and by the end of 1948 approximately 75,000 EVWs had been placed in employment.

The scheme also took in Ukrainian prisoners of war (POWs). Many of these were put into makeshift camps, a total of 9 holding camps existed for EVWs with around 9,500 people accommodated in July 1947.

The relatively high level of economic growth in the UK during the post-war period led an acute labour shortage within key sectors. EVWs were first and foremost invited in order to cover the need for low-paid and unskilled work to work in industry sections like mining, iron, textiles and steel, but also in the health system and agriculture. The majority of EVWs originated in Ukraine, Poland and Latvia. During the selection process, interviews were conducted, and medical reports were prepared. Since many of these people were displaced because of World War II, also a humanitarian element has been attributed to some of the EVW schemes. In total some 91,000 people came to the UK between 1946 and 1949 under the various EVW schemes. EVWs were initially referred to as ‘Displaced Persons’, since many of the arrivals had been displaced by World War II. This term was however replaced by ‘EVW’ due to its derogatory connotations.

Some of the schemes in place, such as Balt Cygnet, did not make any provisions for dependents. These schemes did however experience problems with recruitment, and the most successful scheme ‘Westward Ho!' did accommodate for both children and spouses. EVWs who came to the UK were generally paid the same wage and had the same rights as British workers. Some did however experience discrimination, especially within trades with strong trade unions. They were for instance often refused positions with more responsibility and were in some places fired before British workers in the case of redundancies. Another criticism was that some of the residents of the shelters had to live in large camps without contact with their families and the local population. A total of around 80,000 European Volunteer Workers and former displaced persons have been recruited through the Balt Cygnet and Westward Ho! programmes.

EVWs were entitled to after residing for the correct amount of time to apply for British citizenship. About 262 Yugoslavs had naturalised by 1952.

=== Geographical concentration ===
A large proportion of EVWs were concentrated in the North of England, particularly around Lancashire and West Yorkshire. In March 1948 there was around 3,500 textile workers in Lancashire.

=== Marital status ===
While most EVWs were single (and this being a requirement of the scheme), a degree of those who came were married and they often brought dependents with them. In 1947 around 7,500 married male and female EVWs arrived into Britain, with around 1,500 dependents and 600 among these being children under 16.

Nearly half of those that arrived in the first quarter of 1948 were working in agriculture.

== Legacy ==
The EVW scheme took place under the wider take in of European refugees after World War Two.

== Statistics ==
Nationality and gender of European Voluntary Workers at 31 December 1950
Nationality	Men	Women	Total	Dependents
Latvian	9,675	3,244	12,919	1322
Lithuanian	4,790	1,396	6,186	741
Estonian	2,919	2235	5,154	503
Polish	9,094	4,538	13,632	99
Polish-Ukrainians	10,131	2,762	12,893	474
Ukrainian (Note: Mainly Ukrainian POWs)	6,063	1,956	8,019	389
Yugoslav	8,848	778	9,626	30
Hungarian	2,110	429	2,539	15
Greek	59	16	75	–
Czechoslovak	1,106	157	1,263	–
Volkdeutche	744	634	1,378	–
Sudetens	–	1,304	1,304	–
Stateless	256	133	389	84
Undetermined	535	164	699	23
Others	774	137	911	35
Total arrivals	57,104	19,883	76,987	3715
Number of arrivals who had returned to Europe in Dec 1950	2,391	931	3,322	–
Total	54,713	18,952	73,665	–

First placings in employment of foreign workers brought to the UK under official recruitment schemes as at 5 February 1949
Industry/service	Men	Women	Total
Agriculture	29,298	65	29,363
Domestic	3690	8,134	11,824
Coal mining	10,967	-	10,967
Cotton spinning, doubling and weaving	1,042	6,751	7,793
Woollen industry	1,077	3,220	4,297
Brick and allied industries	2,502	2	2,504
National Services Hostels Corporation	1,455	917	2,372
Army and Air Force Deports & Installations	1,435	-	1,435
Rayon	540	877	1,417
Iron and steel	1,306	1	1,307
Quarrying	685	-	685
Nursing	166	461	627
Laundries	2	389	391
Hosiery	24	275	299
Cement	259	-	259
Scottish Hydro Electric	250	-	250
Jute	18	173	191
Pottery	136	31	167
Home-grown timber	107	-	107
Refractories	97	-	97
Boot and shoe manufacture	63	11	74
Wholesale clothing	4	57	61
Gas industry	57	-	57
Clay pits	57	-	57
Gypsum mining	49	-	49
Flax spinning and weaving	39	7	46
Textiles	17	-	17
Flax processing	15	-	15
Miscellanous	861	63	924
Total	56,218	21,434	77,652

== See also ==
- Baltic people in the United Kingdom
- Displaced persons camps in post-World War II Europe
- Immigration to the United Kingdom since 1922
- Polish migration to the United Kingdom
- Ukrainian diaspora in the United Kingdom
