= Andrejs Pildegovičs =

Latvian diplomat (born 1971)

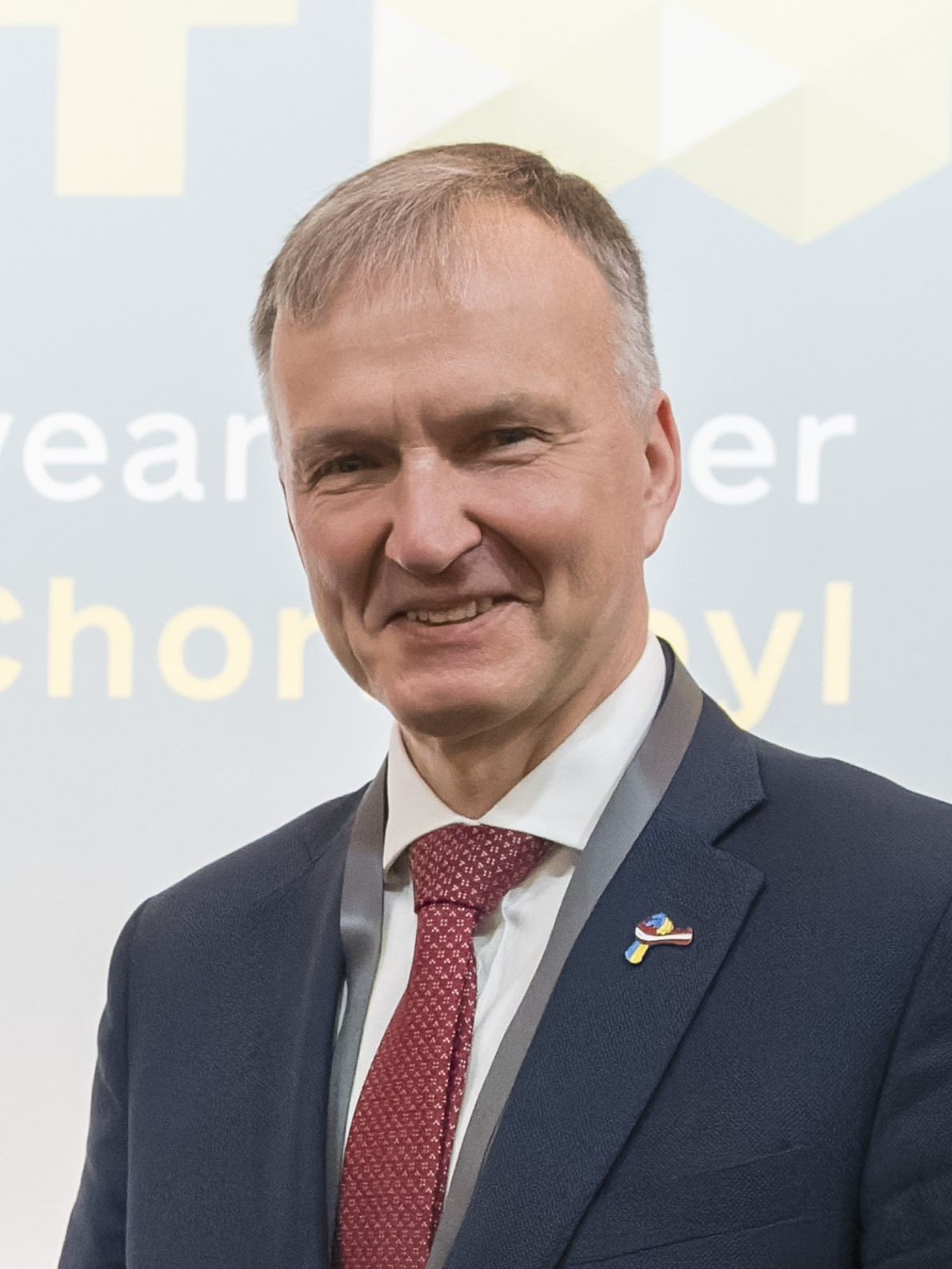
- Pildegovičs in 2026

Ambassador of Latvia to Ukraine
- Incumbent
- Assumed office August 12, 2025
- President: Edgars Rinkēvičs
- Preceded by: Ilgvars Kļava

Personal details
- Born: August 11, 1971 (age 55) Vladivostok, Russian SFSR, Soviet Union (now Russian Federation)
- Education: University of St. Petersburg; University of Oxford

Andrejs Pildegovičs (born August 11, 1971) is a Latvian public figure, diplomat and a civil servant. Currently, he is acting as an Ambassador of Special Tasks of the Secretariat of the Candidate of Latvia to the UN Security Council, as well as being the Permanent Representative of Latvia to the UN (2018).

== Biography ==
Born on August 11, 1971, in Vladivostok, in the family of the sinologist Pēteris Pildegovičs and his wife Galina. From 1988 to 1994, he studied Chinese language and Chinese history at the University of St. Petersburg and the Beijing Institute of Foreign Languages (1990–1991).

In 1994 he began working as a civil servant in the Ministry of Foreign Affairs, in 1995 he majored in diplomacy at Standford Hoover Institute, was assistant secretary of state at the Ministry of Foreign Affairs of the Republic of Latvia, then until 1998 press secretary of the ministry.

After completing his foreign service specialisation at the University of Oxford (1998–1999), he headed the Asia-Africa Section of the Ministry of Foreign Affairs (1999–2000). In 2000, he joined the Chancellery of the President of Latvia, Vaira Vīķe-Freiberga, and until 2006 he was an adviser to the President of Latvia on foreign affairs. From 2006 to 2007, he headed the Chancery of the President of Latvia.

From 2007 to 2012 he was the Ambassador of Latvia to the United States. In July 2012, he began to head the political department of the Ministry of Foreign Affairs. Became State Secretary of the Ministry in May 2013.

In August 2018 he submitted a letter of accreditation to UN Secretary-General António Guterres as Permanent Representative of Latvia to the UN. From 2023-2025, he has been ambassador of special assignments of the secretariat and head of the secretariat of Latvia's candidacy to the UN Security Council. On 12 August 2025, President Edgars Rinkēvičs presented Pildegovičs with his credentials as Latvia's Ambassador to Ukraine.

== Awards ==
In 2015, he was awarded the Order of the Three Stars, III class.
