= Andris Teikmanis =

Latvian politician (born 1959)

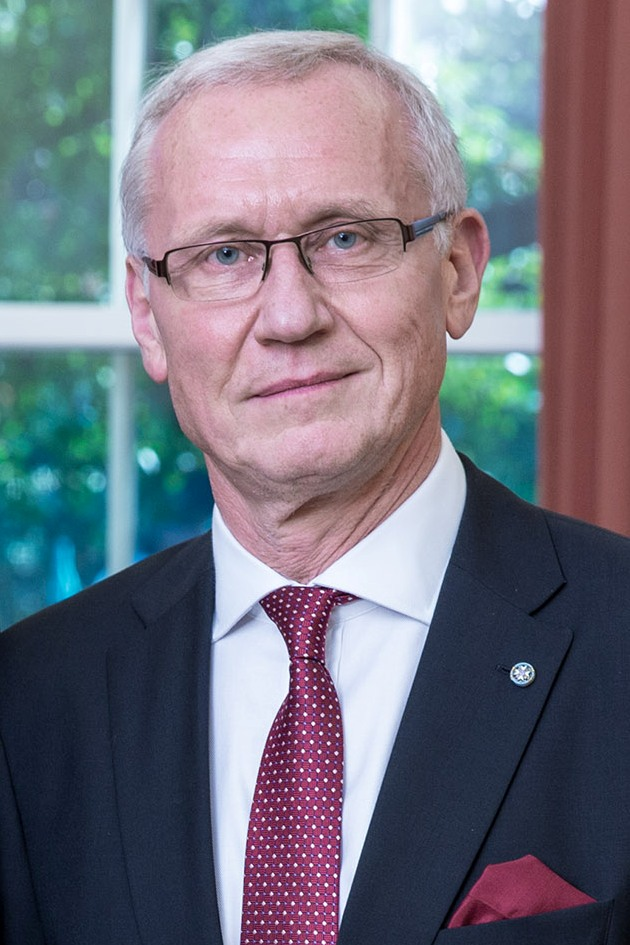

1st Mayor of Riga
- In office 1990–1994
- Succeeded by: Māris Purgailis

Personal details
- Born: 29 November 1959 (age 66) Rīga, Latvian SSR, Soviet Union
- Party: Popular Front of Latvia
- Education: University of Latvia
- Profession: Lawyer, diplomat

Andris Teikmanis (29 November 1959; Riga, Latvia) is a Latvian lawyer, politician, and diplomat. He served as first post-soviet Mayor of Riga from 1990 to 1994. In September 2016 he was accredited as the Latvian ambassador to the United States. He previously served as Under Secretary in the Ministry of Foreign Affairs in Riga, and as Latvian ambassador to the Council of Europe, to the Russian Federation, to Germany, and to the United Kingdom, and as non-resident ambassador to Australia and New Zealand. From 2019 to 2023 A. Teikmanis was head of the Chancery of the President of Latvia Egils Levits.

Preceded by Alfrēds Rubiks	Mayor of Riga; 1990–1994	Succeeded by Māris Purgailis
