= Latvian diplomatic service in exile =

Latvian governmental service (1940–1991)

Republic of Latvia Diplomatic service in exile
- Flag of Latvia

- Coat of arms of Latvia

Agency overview
- Formed: 1940
- Dissolved: 1991
- Superseding agency: Ministry of Foreign Affairs (Latvia)
- Jurisdiction: Diplomatic missions of Latvia in countries that did not recognize the Soviet occupation and annexation of Latvia
- Headquarters: United States
- Agency executives: Kārlis Reinholds Zariņš; Arnolds Spekke; Anatols Dinbergs

The Latvian diplomatic service in exile (Latvian: Latvijas diplomātiskais un konsulārais dienests trimdā) was the only governmental body of the Republic of Latvia which continued its activities during the Nazi and Soviet occupation of Latvia during 1940–1991. Latvian diplomats who were stationed in embassies and consulates at the moment of the occupation in 1940, refused to recognize the occupation and return to Soviet Latvia. They continued to formally represent the interests of Latvia in countries that did not recognize the Soviet annexation. After the restoration of Latvian independence in 1991, the diplomats started reporting to the restored Latvian Ministry of Foreign Affairs.

== Background ==
Latvia was occupied on June 17, 1940, by Red Army troops and officially annexed to the Soviet Union on August 5, 1940 in the form of the Latvian Soviet Socialist Republic.

One month before the occupation, on 17 May 1940 the Cabinet of Ministers granted extraordinary powers to Kārlis Zariņš, Latvia’s Ambassador to the United Kingdom. Zariņš was authorised to defend Latvia’s interests, supervise the work of Latvia’s representations abroad and handle their finances and property. This created a legal basis for the functioning of the diplomatic service in the absence of a legal government in Latvia.

The United States never recognized the forcible and illegal annexation of the Baltic States in conformity with the principles of the Stimson Doctrine (US Under Secretary of State Sumner Welles’s Declaration of July 23, 1940), and more than 50 countries followed this position.

The work of the diplomatic service was financed from Latvian gold reserves in foreign banks.

== Activity ==
During the occupation, Latvian diplomatic missions continued their work in Argentina, Brazil, Australia, Canada, Denmark, France, West Germany, Italy, the Netherlands, Norway, Spain, Sweden, Switzerland, the United Kingdom and the United States.

The Latvian diplomatic service regularly issued official statements regarding the illegality of the Soviet occupation and annexation of Latvia as well as regarding Latvia’s right to restore its national independence. It was also protecting the interests of Latvian citizens abroad and the Latvian property abroad. In 1947 a joint communication on the occupation of Baltic states to the UN was sent by the Estonian, Latvian and Lithuanian diplomats abroad. The Baltic Appeal to the United Nations (now "Baltic Association to the United Nations") was formed in 1966.

On March 26, 1949, the US State Department issued a circular stating that the Baltic states were still independent nations with their own diplomatic representatives.

In 1969, the Latvian Counselor to the US Anatols Dinbergs, among leaders of 73 countries around the world, signed the Apollo 11 Goodwill Messages on behalf of the Latvian nation.

Nevertheless, Latvia was not allowed to establish a government-in-exile in any Western country or sign the Declaration of the United Nations (1942), as Latvian diplomats wished. The Soviet Foreign Ministry issued formal protests against the Baltic diplomatic missions remaining open in Washington DC and elsewhere. In Canada the official list of diplomats included the offices of the Baltic states: Estonia, Latvia and Lithuania. In the early 1960s that caused the Soviet Embassy in Canada to refuse to receive the lists distributed by the Canadian Department of External Affairs. Eventually, the UK excluded the Baltic diplomats from the Diplomatic List, but as a compromise Baltic diplomats continued to be accepted as possessing a diplomatic character by His/Her Majesty's Governments.

The Latvian diplomatic service in exile actively co-operated with organizations of the Latvian diaspora in joint efforts to keep Western countries from formally recognizing Latvia’s annexation by the USSR. The existence of the exiled diplomatic service was another demonstration of the illegality of the annexation.

== Transition of mandate after restoration of independence ==
The exiled diplomatic service of Latvia played an important role during the restoration of independence of Latvia in 1988 - 1990 and in ensuring the legal continuity between the newly independent Latvian state and the interwar Latvian Republic.

Latvia's parliament officially restored the country’s full independence on the 21 August 1991 in the aftermath of the failed Soviet coup attempt. Wide international recognition of restored independence started after that, and the legations and consulates of the exiled diplomatic service were transferred to the Latvian Ministry of Foreign Affairs. Anatols Dinbergs, the last head of the diplomatic service in exile, was promoted to the rank of Ambassador and Permanent Representative to the United Nations (September - December 1991) as well as Ambassador to the United States (1991–1992).

== Heads of the Latvian diplomatic service in exile ==
- Kārlis Zariņš (Charles Zarine) (1940–1963)
- Arnolds Spekke (1963–1970)
- Anatols Dinbergs (1971–1991)

== See also ==
- State continuity of the Baltic states
- Ministry of Foreign Affairs (Latvia)
- Latvian Central Council
- Estonian Diplomatic Service (1940–1991)
- Lithuanian Diplomatic Service
- Baltic Legations (1940–1991)
