= State continuity of the Baltic states =

Legal continuity of Estonia, Latvia, and Lithuania

The three Baltic countries, or the Baltic states – Estonia, Latvia, and Lithuania – are held to have continued as independent states under international law while under Soviet occupation from 1940 to 1991, as well as during the German occupation in 1941–1944/1945. The prevailing opinion accepts the Baltic thesis that the Soviet occupation was illegal, and all actions of the Soviet Union related to the occupation are regarded as contrary to international law in general and to the bilateral treaties between the USSR and the three Baltic countries in particular.

This legal continuity has been recognised by most Western powers and is reflected in their state practice. The application of the Stimson Doctrine by the Welles Declaration where a significant segment of the international community refused to grant formal approval for the 1940 Soviet conquest during World War II, the resistance by the Baltic peoples to the Soviet regime, and the uninterrupted functioning of rudimentary state organs in exile support the legal position that sovereign title never passed to the Soviet Union, which implied that occupation sui generis (German: Annexionsbesetzung, lit. 'annexation occupation') lasted until the Soviet Union recognized the independence of the three countries in 1991. Thus the Baltic states continued to exist as subjects of international law. On that basis, the Baltic states maintained that they did not need to follow the process of secession outlined in the Soviet Constitution, since they were reasserting an independence that still existed.

The official position of Russia is a continuation of the Soviet position that Estonia, Latvia, and Lithuania were not annexed by the Soviet Union but joined of their own accord in 1940. Russia insists that incorporation of the Baltic states gained international de jure recognition by the agreements made in the 1945 Yalta Conference, the 1945 Potsdam Conference, and by the 1975 Helsinki Accords. They have also argued that in accordance with the internal Soviet laws and constitution, restoration of independence was illegal and the Baltic republics could become newly created sovereign entities only via the secession laws of the USSR. According to this position, all previous treaties, such as the 1920 Treaty of Tartu, are invalidated, and all possible claims by Baltic states for monetary compensation have no legal basis. This alternative thesis on continuity of the Baltic states and its related consequences has fueled a fundamental confrontation between Russia and the Baltic states.

The legal principle, ex injuria jus non oritur (law cannot arise from unjust acts), differs from the competing principle of ex factis jus oritur (the facts determine the law). On one hand, legal recognition of Baltic incorporation on the part of other sovereign nations outside the Soviet bloc was largely withheld based on the fundamental legal principle of ex injuria jus non oritur, since the annexation of the Baltic states was held to be illegal. On the other hand, de facto interruption of statehood due to foreign occupation for a period of fifty years did indeed occur, giving a place to the legal principle of ex factis jus oritur, as well as irrevocable territory and demographic changes that make the Baltic case much more complex than mere restitutio in integrum (a restoration of—in this case—territorial integrity).

== Historical background ==
The four countries on the Baltic Sea that were formerly parts of the Russian Empire – Finland, Estonia, Latvia, and Lithuania – consolidated their borders and independence after the Estonian, Latvian, and Lithuanian independence wars following the end of World War I by 1920 (see Treaty of Tartu, Latvian-Soviet Riga Peace Treaty and Soviet-Lithuanian Treaty of 1920). The European Great Powers accorded de jure recognition of Estonia and Latvia on 26 January 1921 and Lithuania on 20 December 1922. The United States extended de jure recognition to all three states on 28 July 1922.

All three peace treaties between the respective Baltic states and Soviet Russia identically enshrined the right of self-determination and Russia renounced all previous rights and claims as final and permanent. This principle of self-determination reflected one of four key principles proclaimed by Lenin and Stalin on 15 November 1917 in the Declaration of the Soviet Government: "The right for Russia's peoples of free self-determination even unto separation and establishment of independent states." After the creation of the Union of Soviet Socialist Republics in 1922, the new union had by 6 July 1923 adopted all treaties entered into previously by Soviet Russia and the original peace treaties continued to be a basis for relations between the USSR and Estonia, Latvia, and Lithuania, respectively.

In the subsequent decade, several bilateral and multilateral treaties and agreements regulating relations were entered into:

- Protocol to bring into force the Pact of Paris (to which all four parties were original signatories), signed in Moscow on 9 February 1929, renouncing war as an instrument of national policy
- bilateral Treaties of Non-Aggression signed with the respective Baltic states and the Soviet Union between 1926 and 1932
- Conciliation conventions related to the Non-Aggression treaties
- Convention for the Definition of Aggression signed in London in July 1933

This Convention for the Definition of Aggression, an initiative of the Soviet Government, defined in Article 2 various acts as aggression, including naval blockades. The Convention also stipulates that "No political, military, economic or other consideration may serve as an excuse or justification for the aggression referred to in Article 2."

=== Estonia ===
Estonia adopted the Estonian Declaration of Independence on 24 February 1918. The document stated a number of principles such as freedom of expression, religion, assembly and association. These principles were further elaborated in the Provisional Constitution of Estonia (Estonian: Eesti vabariigi valitsemise ajutine kord) of 1919 and the first Constitution of 1920. Popular sovereignty was to be the basis of Estonia. Also, the second, presidential Constitution was based on popular sovereignty. Later the Constitution of 1938 was an attempt to return to democratic rule, but it still accorded powers to the president. Overall, in spite of internal political changes, Estonia was a legal, internationally recognized state in the years prior to 1940.

This independence was interrupted in June 1940, in the aftermath of the Molotov–Ribbentrop Pact between Nazi Germany and the Soviet Union of August 1939. The Soviet Union used a similar pattern with all three Baltic states, beginning with ultimatums on the basis of alleged failures to fulfill mutual assistance pacts signed the previous year. The ultimatums had to be obeyed within hours, and soon after the Soviet troops marched into the capitals. The Soviets proposed and approved their new governments. Now, the new local governments seemingly made decisions which led to the annexation. In order to create an image of legitimacy, new elections were imposed under the presence of Soviet troops. The United States, along with a number of other states, did not recognise the occupation and annexation of the Baltic states.

=== Latvia ===
Latvia adopted the Declaration Establishing a Provisional Government of Latvia on 18 November 1918. In 1920, the freely elected Constitutional Assembly adopted two basic laws. The Satversme was adopted in 1922. However, Prime Minister Kārlis Ulmanis took power by a coup d'état and the parliament was dissolved in 1934.

=== Lithuania ===
After a century of foreign domination the Council of Lithuania adopted the Act of Independence of Lithuania on 16 February 1918. During the first decades of the Republic of Lithuania, three Constitutions were adopted in 1922, in 1928 and in 1938. The legislative institution of Lithuania was the freely elected parliament. However, Antanas Smetona took power by a coup d'état in 1926. He adopted the Constitution of 1928 which increased presidential power and reduced the size of parliament from 85 members to 49. In the Constitution of 1938, the president received broader powers, but the parliament was entrusted with legislation instead of the previous system of presidential decrees. Furthermore, the president was elected by the people for seven years.

=== Soviet incorporation in international law ===
The forcible annexation of the Baltic states was an illegal act under both customary and conventional international law. Under customary law the annexation violated the basic principles such as state sovereignty and independence, the prohibition against violent seizure of territory and the prohibition against intervention. In conventional law the actions of the Soviet Union violated practically every provision of every major convention between the Soviet Union and the respective Baltic states. The Secret Protocols with Germany were a violation of Article 2 of the Estonian and Latvian Non-Aggression treaties. The threat to use force and the ultimatum to conclude the Treaties of Mutual Assistance violated the spirit and letter of the respective Peace Treaties, the Non-Aggression Treaties, the Conciliation Conventions, the Kellogg–Briand Pact and the Protocol for the Renunciation of War. The Soviet action in the military occupation, forcible intervention and annexation constituted an act of aggression within the meaning of Article 2 of the Conventions for the Definition of Aggression of 1933, nor was there any justification according to Article 3 and the Annex of that same convention.

== Western non-recognition of annexation ==
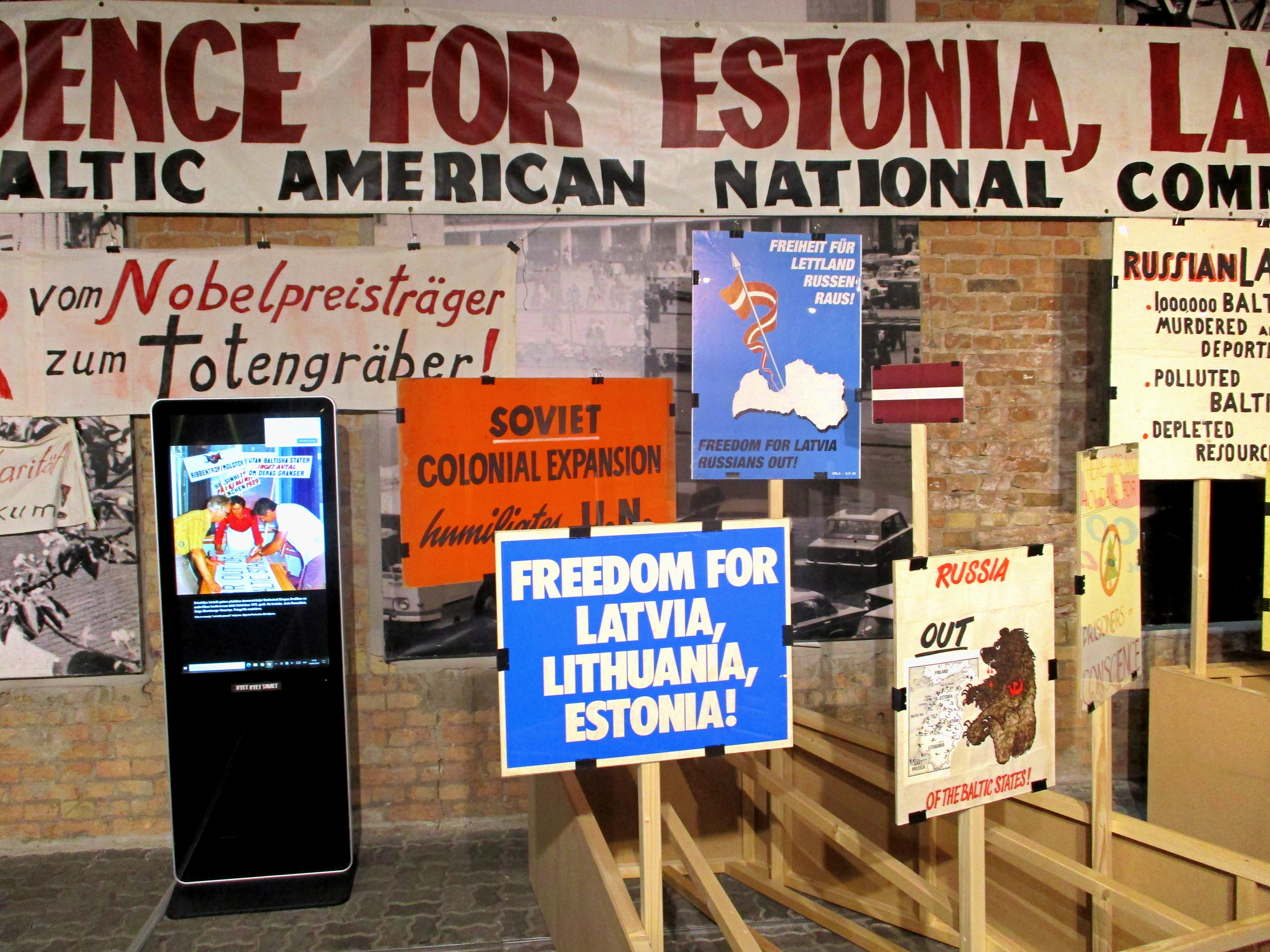
Baltic exilee protest signs from the second half of the 20th century against the Soviet occupation of the Baltic States

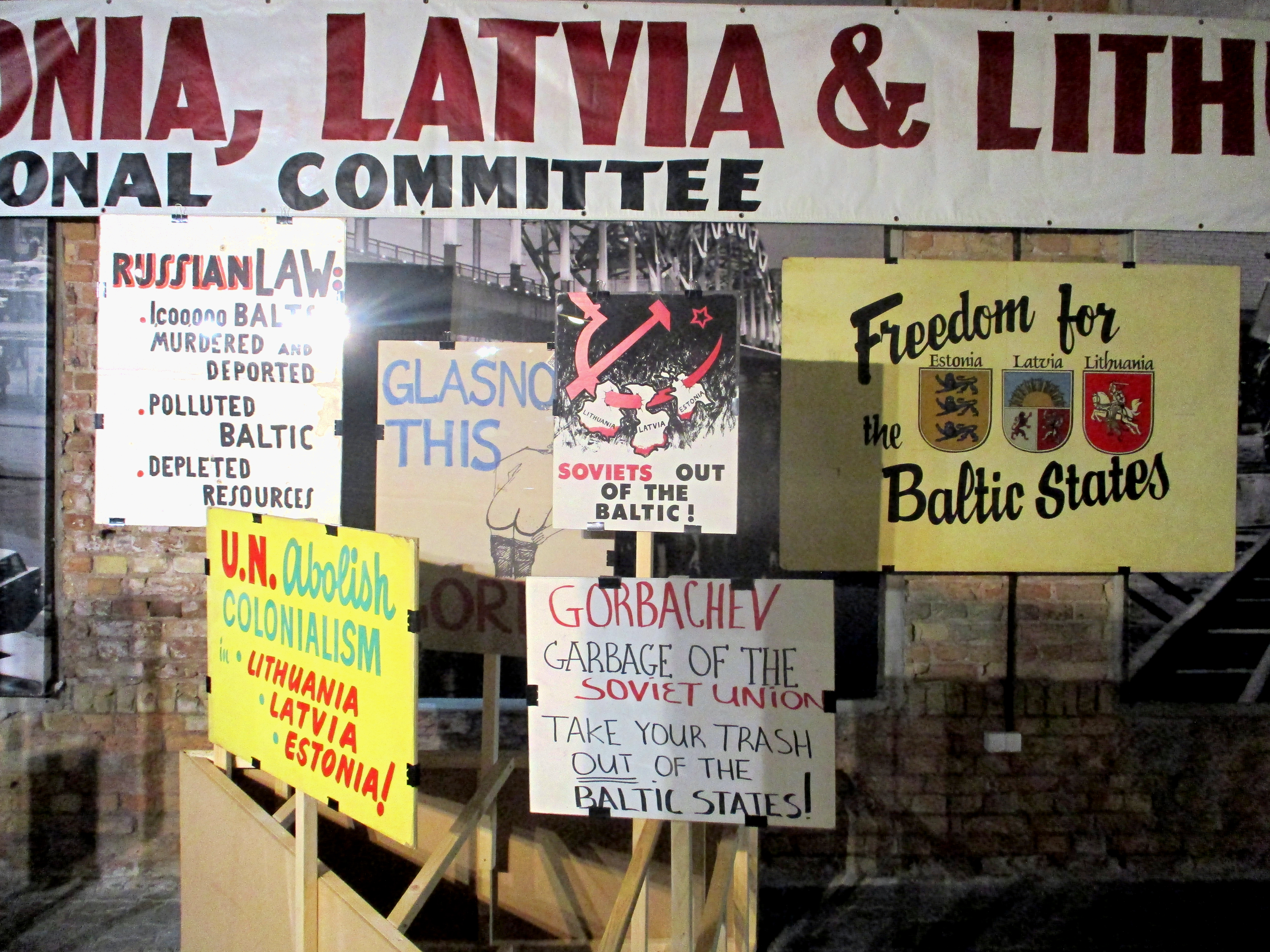
Baltic exilee protest signs from the second half of the 20th century against the Soviet occupation of the Baltic States

=== Baltic diplomatic sphere 1940–1991 ===
Most of the countries in the Western Bloc refused to recognise the incorporation of the Baltic states de jure and only recognised the Soviet local "governments" in Estonian SSR, Latvian SSR and Lithuanian SSR de facto or not at all. Such countries recognized Estonian/Latvian/Lithuanian diplomats and consuls who still functioned in the name of their former governments. These aging diplomats persisted in this anomalous situation until the ultimate restoration of Baltic independence.

During the period 1940–1991, the US continued to receive Baltic diplomats, first appointed in office by the Baltic governments before 1940, after 1980 by the Baltic diplomatic services’ senior members. The Soviet Foreign Ministry issued formal protests against the Baltic diplomatic missions remaining open in Washington, DC, and elsewhere.

In 1947, a joint communication on the occupation of Baltic nations to the UN was sent by the Estonian, Latvian and Lithuanian diplomats abroad. The Baltic Appeal to the United Nations (now "Baltic Association to the United Nations") was formed in 1966.

On 26 March 1949, the US State Department issued a circular stating that the Baltic states were still independent nations with their own diplomatic representatives.

In Canada, the official list of diplomats included the offices of Estonia, Latvia, and Lithuania that in the early 1960s caused the Soviet Embassy in Canada to refuse to receive the lists distributed by the Canadian Department of External Affairs.

Eventually, the UK excluded the Baltic diplomats from the Diplomatic List, but, as a compromise, Baltic diplomats continued to be accepted as possessing a diplomatic character by His/Her Majesty's Governments.

The UN received numerous appeals from the Baltic diplomatic missions, Baltic refugee organizations, resistance groups in Baltic countries and the US diplomats and policy makers concerning the Baltic question. Due to the presence of the USSR in the Security Council, the questions were never raised on the official agenda of the UN. A joint appeal to the UN was made by the resistance groups in Baltic countries, calling the United Nations to denounce the Soviet occupation that resulted in the 1983 resolution of the European Parliament on the restoration of Baltic independence.

=== Baltic assets 1940–1991 ===
After the invasion of Denmark and Norway by Nazi Germany on 9 April 1940, President Franklin Delano Roosevelt issued Executive Order 8389, under which the United States Department of the Treasury froze all financial assets of occupied European countries in the US. After the Soviet occupation of Estonia, Latvia, and Lithuania, Executive Order 8389 was extended to the assets and properties of the three Baltic countries. During the first Soviet occupation in July 1940, the United States issued Executive Order 8484 which froze Latvian, Lithuanian and Estonian financial assets, including gold reserves. The freezing of Baltic assets by the US was condemned by the Soviet Union, and it was declared that there should not be any legal basis for delaying the transfer of the Baltic gold from the US Federal Reserve to the State Bank of the Soviet Union.

==== Gold reserves ====
Estonia, Latvia, and Lithuania also kept gold reserves in banks in the United Kingdom. In July 1940, the Bank of England sequestrated the Baltic gold reserves deposited in the UK, partly as a retaliation of the nationalisation of British owned property in the Baltic countries by the USSR, but also because Britain considered annexation of the three countries unlawful. During the 1950s, the USSR claimed the gold regularly but was rejected. In 1967, the Labour government used the reserve in settling mutual claims with the Soviet Union. On 5 January 1968, an agreement between the UK and USSR was achieved, and the Soviet Union renounced all claims to the Baltic gold held in the Bank of England in return for the waiving of all claims by the UK arising from nationalizations in the USSR. In 1992 and 1993, the United Kingdom government transferred an equal amount of gold reserves equivalent to £90 million back to the Baltic countries.

The three Baltic governments' assets deposited in Sweden were released to Soviet Union immediately after the Soviets demanded the Baltics' gold reserves to be handed over in 1940. The amount was compensated in 1992 by Sweden to the three countries soon after they had regained full independence. In 1991, Sweden promised Estonia to restitute the gold, and, in 1998, the Swedish government discovered the bank accounts belonging to Baltic nationalities.

The French government refused to turn over the three tons of gold deposited in the Bank of France by Latvia and Lithuania to the USSR.

The gold reserves deposited by the three Baltic states prior to 1940 into the Bank for International Settlements in Switzerland remained intact. After the Baltic countries regained independence in 1991, the Baltic gold was released to the central banks of Estonia, Latvia and Lithuania.

==== Property ====
After the 1940 occupation, there were issues related to the property of Baltic citizens abroad. The majority of foreign states refused to send Baltic ships in their ports to the Soviet Union. The Soviet government brought lawsuits against Canada, Ireland, the United Kingdom, and the United States without results. American and British courts did not recognize the Soviet authority to the property of Baltic nationals. However, states gave Baltic legations and consulates to the Soviet Union, although some of transfers stipulated that the process did not involve legal title.

At the end of the Second World War, the building housing the Estonian Legation in Berlin was placed under guardianship by the German authorities. On 23 September 1991, a German court lifted that guardianship and restored the property to Estonia.

==== Liabilities ====
On 4 December 1991, leaders of the "constituent republics" of the Soviet Union (which ceased to exist a few weeks later) signed the treaty on the division of the Soviet foreign debt. The three independent Baltic countries refused to participate in the process, and never signed the treaty. In 1993, the Russian Federation announced it would alone be responsible for the debt.

=== Helsinki Accords ===
The Baltic question was raised during the negotiations of the Final Act of the Conference on Security and Cooperation in Europe in 1975. During the negotiations, the Soviet Union advocated for any attempt of territorial claims to be deemed an act of aggression. West Germany, Spain, Ireland, and Canada opposed this; the Canadian representatives stated that accepting the Soviet proposal would mean de jure recognition of the Soviet incorporation of the Baltic states. Supported by other NATO members, the final act instead stated that the current "frontiers"—boundaries of territorial control, as opposed to "borders" which would signify boundaries of sovereign jurisdiction—of the Soviet Union would not be violated. The president of the United States and leaders of other NATO member states confirmed in statements that the provision did not entail recognition of the incorporation of the Baltic states into the Soviet Union. Nevertheless, Russia insists that the international community legally recognised the incorporation of the Baltic states into the USSR at Yalta, Potsdam, and Helsinki, characterizing Helsinki as recognizing sovereign borders.

=== List of recognition and non-recognition of annexation ===
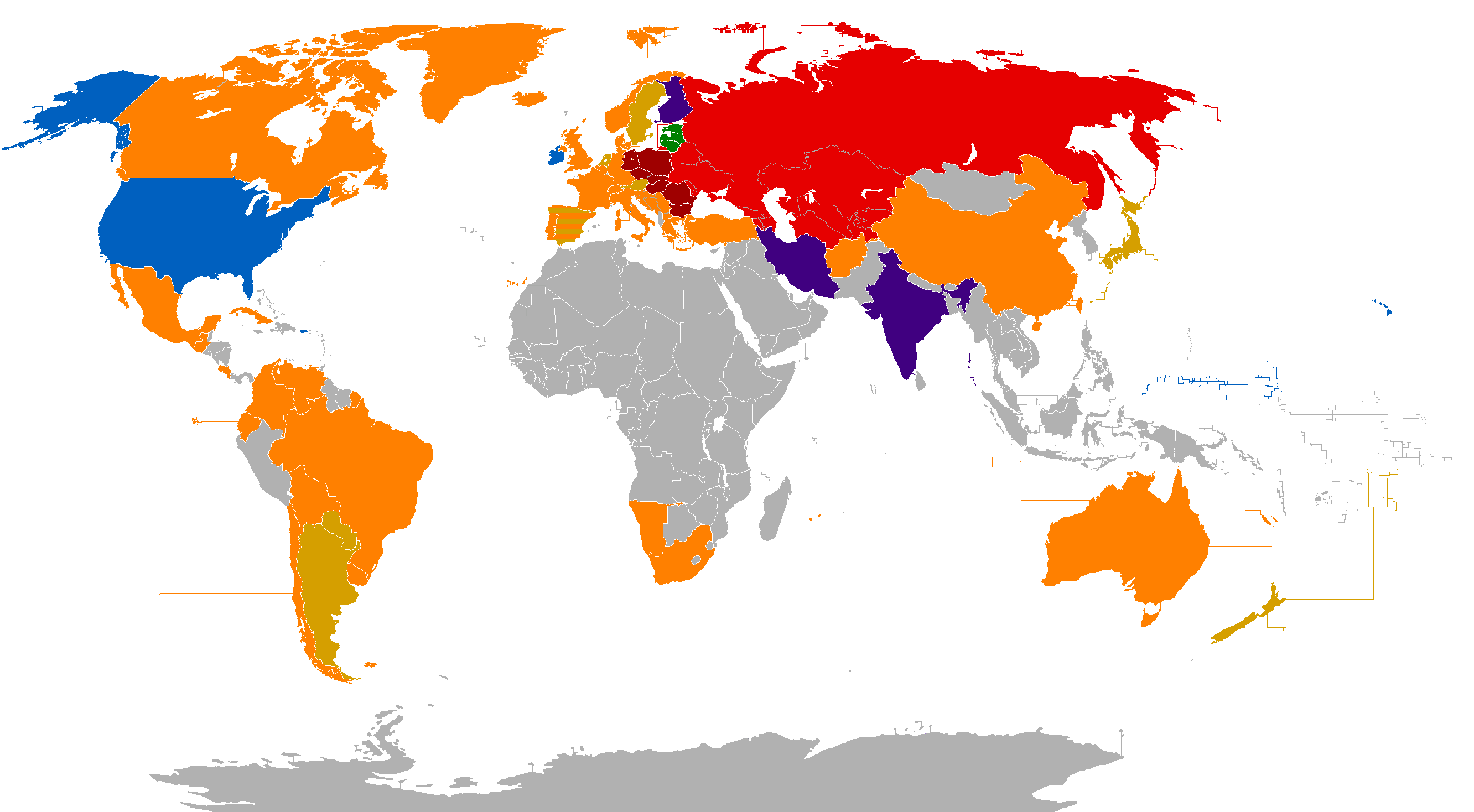
Extent of recognition/non-recognition of the Soviet annexation of the Baltics: Baltic states Soviet Union Warsaw Pact socialist countries Nations that explicitly did not recognize the Soviet annexation of the Baltic states, either de jure or de facto Nations that explicitly did not recognize the Soviet annexation of the Baltic states de jure but recognised the Soviet administration in the Baltics de facto Nations that recognized the annexation of the Baltic states into the Soviet Union de jure States that have not expressed their position in any way

In terms of the annexation of the Baltic states, the nations of the world form five groups: 1. countries that explicitly and consistently did not recognise the Soviet occupation and annexation, either de jure or de facto; 2. countries that never recognised the Soviet occupation de jure but occasionally recognised the Soviet occupation and administration in the Baltics de facto; 3. countries that at some point of time also recognised the incorporation of the Baltic states into the USSR de jure; 4. countries that have not expressed their position in any way. 5. countries under communist rule that considered the annexation of the three Baltic countries into the USSR legal without reservation.

==== De jure and de facto non-recognition ====
- United States – maintained official diplomatic relations, neither de jure nor de facto recognition accorded. After the opening of the US consulate in Leningrad in 1973, whose consular district included Tallinn, Riga and Vilnius, US officials began contacts with Soviet officials in Estonia, Latvia and Lithuania. The US consul general would not directly engage with the highest level Soviet state and Communist party officials in the three countries, but conducted visits to the three capitals and met with the deputy leaders in the state and party hierarchies.
- Vatican City – maintained official diplomatic relations, neither de jure nor de facto recognition accorded.
- Ireland – no official relations, neither de jure nor de facto recognition accorded.

==== 2. De jure non-recognition, recognition of de facto control ====
- Afghanistan – no final decision on non-recognition policy, no official relations with Baltic representatives
- Australia – semi official relations maintained with Baltic representatives, though de jure recognised for 17 months between July 1974 and December 1975 by the Whitlam government on Whitlam's personal initiative as prime minister and acting foreign minister Recognition was withdrawn by the subsequent Fraser government in 1975.
- Belgium – no final decision on non-recognition policy, no official relations with Baltic representatives
- Brazil – official relations with Baltic representatives, save for the Política Externa Independente era.
- Canada – semi official relations maintained with Baltic representatives. De facto recognition accorded, de jure denied
- China
- Republic of China (Taiwan)
- Cyprus
- France – maintained semi official relations with Baltic representatives, no recognition de jure per policy statement
- Guatemala
- Iceland – no official diplomatic relations
- Iran – No official relations, though the Shah of Iran's state visit to Tallinn in 1972 implied recognition.
- Italy – de facto recognition accorded. The consular district of the Italian Consulate-General in Leningrad included the cities of Tallinn, Riga and Vilnius
- South Korea – no diplomatic relations with USSR
- Luxembourg – no official relations
- Malta
- Norway – no official relations, no final decision on non-recognition policy
- Philippines
- Spain – maintained semi-official diplomatic relations, had no diplomatic relations with USSR until 1977, neither de jure nor de facto recognition accorded until 1977.
- Switzerland – some relations maintained, fiduciary of Baltic assets, no final decision on non-recognition policy
- Turkey – no official relations, no final decision on non-recognition policy
- United Kingdom – maintained semi official diplomatic relations, de facto recognition accorded
- Uruguay – maintained official diplomatic relations
- West Germany – recognition of Baltic passports, no final decision on non-recognition policy, no de jure recognition accorded
- Yugoslavia
- Chile
- Costa Rica
- Ecuador
- Liberia
- Paraguay
- Portugal
- South Africa
- Venezuela

==== De jure non-recognition ====
- Japan — no de jure recognition of legality of Soviet occupation.

No official relations, no final decision on non-recognition policy

- Ethiopia
- Greece

Some relations with Baltic representatives maintained, no final decision on non-recognition policy

- Colombia
- Cuba
- Denmark
- Mexico

==== De jure recognition ====
- Argentina – Implicit de jure recognition. Did not accept Baltic passports.
- Austria – Implicit de jure recognition. Did not accept Baltic passports.
- Bolivia
- Netherlands – Implicit de jure recognition in 1942, when diplomatic relations were established with the USSR without reservation.
- New Zealand – In 1977.
- Spain – Implicit de jure recognition in 1977, when diplomatic relations were established with the USSR without reservation during the Spanish transition to democracy.
- Sweden – In 1944, Sweden became one of the first among the few countries to recognize the Soviet occupation of the Baltic countries. In 1945, Sweden extradited approximately 170 men from the Baltic countries conscripted into the Waffen SS, who had fled Soviet re-occupation to find refuge in Sweden, to the Soviet Union. On 15 August 2011, Swedish Prime Minister Fredrik Reinfeldt officially apologized to the prime ministers of Estonia, Latvia, and Lithuania at a ceremony in Stockholm saying that "Sweden owes its Baltic neighbours a 'debt of honour' for turning a blind eye to post-war Soviet occupation" and speaking of "a dark moment" in his country's history.

Countries that had gained independence after World War II and did not make any special statements about the issue of the Baltic states when they negotiated diplomatic relations with the Soviet Union (implicitly) recognised the incorporation the Baltic states into the Soviet Union.

==== 4. Countries that did not formally express their position ====
The remaining countries of the world remained silent on the issue for example:

- Finland – no final decision on non-recognition policy, even though President Urho Kaleva Kekkonen's unofficial visit to Estonia in 1964 was often presented as implying recognition. As of the 1980s the Finnish consulate in Leningrad included Tallinn in its consular district, along with the Karelian ASSR. Finland continued diplomatic relations established in 1920 rather than recognise the Baltic states anew in 1991.
- India – While India did not formally express a position, the Prime Minister of India Indira Gandhi's trip to Tallinn during the 1982 state visit to the USSR implied recognition.
- Israel
- North Korea

==== 5. Countries within the Eastern Bloc that considered the annexation of the Baltic states legal ====
- Bulgaria
- Czechoslovakia
- East Germany
- Hungary
- Mongolia
- Poland
- Romania
- Vietnam

== Historical considerations ==
The situation with the Baltic countries was not unique. In the aftermath of World War II, a debate sparked over which norms of international law were applicable to a number of other illegal annexations, such as annexation of Austria and Czechoslovakia by Nazi Germany in 1938. With dissolution of the Soviet Union, Georgia also expressed desire to be recognized as a successor to Democratic Republic of Georgia (1918–1921), but that was rejected mainly because its period of independence was deemed too short.

== Baltic states assert state continuity ==
=== Estonia ===
On 30 March 1990, the Estonian Supreme Council adopted the resolution on the state status of Estonia. The resolution announced that the independence of Estonia de jure had never been suspended even after the 1940 occupation. It declared the 1940 annexation illegal and began a transition to the restoration of de facto independence. A further resolution of the restoration of the Republic of Estonia was adopted on 20 August 1991. The new Constitution was introduced on 29 July 1992. It was approved via a referendum in accordance with the Constitution of 1938, serving further the claims to constitutional continuity.

Estonia's official position since 1990 has been that the election for the "People's Riigikogu" was illegal and unconstitutional, since it was held under an amended electoral law that was passed only by the lower house, the Chamber of Deputies. The upper house, the National Council, had been dissolved shortly after the occupation; the Estonian Constitution explicitly required bills to be passed by both chambers to become law. The National Council was never reconvened, and the 1940 election was only for the Chamber of Deputies. According to August Rei, one of independent Estonia's last envoys to Moscow, under the Estonian constitution, the Chamber of Deputies had "no legislative power" apart from the National Council. On these bases, Estonia maintains that all acts of the "People's Riigikogu," including the resolution to join the Soviet Union, were void.

=== Latvia ===
At the end of the Soviet period, On the Restoration of Independence of the Republic of Latvia was adopted on 4 May 1990. It was to restore the authority of the Constitution of 1922 and provided for the restoration of independence through negotiations with the Soviet Union. It also outlined several reasons why the 1940 annexation was invalid. According to the declaration, the 1940 election to the "People's Saeima" was flagrantly rigged and the results blatantly falsified. Additionally, it was conducted under an illegal and unconstitutional election law adopted under conditions of terror. It also contended that under the 1922 Constitution, the legislature could not change the form of the state on its own authority, but was required to submit such proposed changes to the people in a referendum. On that basis, the declaration argued that all acts of the "People's Saeima" were void. It took the line that Latvia was reasserting an independence that still de jure existed, though it had been de facto lost in 1940. It partly restored the Constitution of 1922 and began a transition to de facto independence. Constitutional law On statehood of the Republic of Latvia declaring immediate restoration of full independence was adopted on 21 August 1991. The fifth parliament was elected in 1993, which fully restored the Constitution of 1922 and upheld the legal continuity of the Republic of Latvia.

=== Lithuania ===
Lithuania adopted a Resolution on the Liquidation of the 1939 Germany–USSR Agreements and their Consequences on 7 February 1990. Unlike Estonia and Latvia, Lithuania proclaimed the re-establishment of the State of Lithuania on 11 March 1990 without a transitional period. The act emphasised the 1918 act and the 1920 resolution for the purposes of constitutional continuity. Also, for a brief period during the voting, the Supreme Council temporarily restored the 1938 Constitution of Lithuania. The Congress of People's Deputies adopted a resolution on 15 March 1990 in which Lithuania's decision violated the Constitution of the Soviet Union. At the same time, the Supreme Council recognised that it was impossible to reconstruct the system as it had existed in 1940. The new Constitution was adopted on 25 October 1992.

Since then, Lithuania's official arguments against the validity of the annexation have focused on Smetona's actions after the occupation. Smetona left the country on 14 June, soon after the troops arrived, and transferred his powers on an interim basis to Prime Minister Antanas Merkys, who stood first in the line of succession to the presidency. On 15 June, Merkys announced he had deposed Smetona and was now president in his own right. On 17 June, the Soviets forced Merkys to appoint the more pliant Justas Paleckis as prime minister. Merkys himself resigned under Soviet pressure later that day, making Paleckis acting president. Lithuania now maintains that Smetona never resigned, rendering Merkys' takeover of the presidency illegal and unconstitutional. Therefore, Lithuania does not recognize Merkys or Paleckis as legitimate presidents, and claims that all actions leading to the Soviet annexation were ipso facto void.

== Baltic state continuity and international law ==
The Montevideo Convention in 1933 was an attempt to list a legal concept of statehood. According to the definition the state has to have a territory, a permanent population, an effective government and the capacity to enter into international relations. However, already during the interwar period, the interpretation and application of the criteria were far from easy, such as the case of Åland. The concept of statehood in international law cannot be explained by mere reference to the Montevideo Convention. Decisions on statehood are taken in given circumstances and at the moment in time.

The Baltic states also base their claim to state continuity on two additional rules; the prohibition of the use of force in international relations and the right to self-determination, as expressed in free and fair elections. The former rule was the Baltic states' answer to Soviet claims that they had to follow the process of secession under the Soviet Constitution of 1977. The Baltic states argued that they joined only as the result of a forcible occupation. They add that the elections to the "People's Parliaments" were illegal, unconstitutional and fraudulent, and that the legislatures served only to rubber-stamp the occupation.

== International reactions to the restoration of Baltic independence ==
=== International organizations ===
The European Communities welcomed the restoration of the sovereignty and independence on 27 August 1991. The Soviet Union recognised the Baltic independence on 6 September 1991. The Conference for Security and Co-operation in Europe admitted the Baltic states as new members on 10 September 1991.

The Parliamentary Assembly of the Council of Europe noted the Soviet Union violated the right of the Baltic people to self-determination. The acts of 1940 had resulted in occupation and illegal annexation. The Council also noted several member states reconfirmed the Baltic states recognition dating back to the 1920s, while other recognised them anew.

Additionally the European Parliament, the European Court of Human Rights and the United Nations Human Rights Council, have declared the Baltic states were invaded, occupied and illegally incorporated into the Soviet Union under provisions of the 1939 Molotov–Ribbentrop Pact.

The admission of Estonia, Latvia, and Lithuania to the United Nations took place in accordance with article four of the United Nations Charter. When the question of membership of the three sovereign countries was considered by the Security Council, the council made reference to the regained independence of the Baltic states. Initially, the amounts of three nations' membership contributions were calculated from the fees previously paid by the Soviet Union. After objections, the United Nations accepted the statements of the three Baltic member nations to the effect that they were not successor states of the Soviet Union. Estonia, Latvia, and Lithuania, all members of the former League of Nations were accepted to the United Nations as new members, due to the fact the League of Nations was not considered a legal predecessor of the United Nations.

The Baltic states were members of the International Labour Organization since 1921. Its recognition was important in supporting the Baltic states in their claim to state continuity. The organisation accepted the three governments' claim to continue their previous membership, and accepted that the Baltic states continued to be bound by ILO conventions entered into prior to 1940. On that basis, the International Labour Organization considered the Baltic states had been readmitted, even though no formal decision determined it.

=== Bilateral relations ===
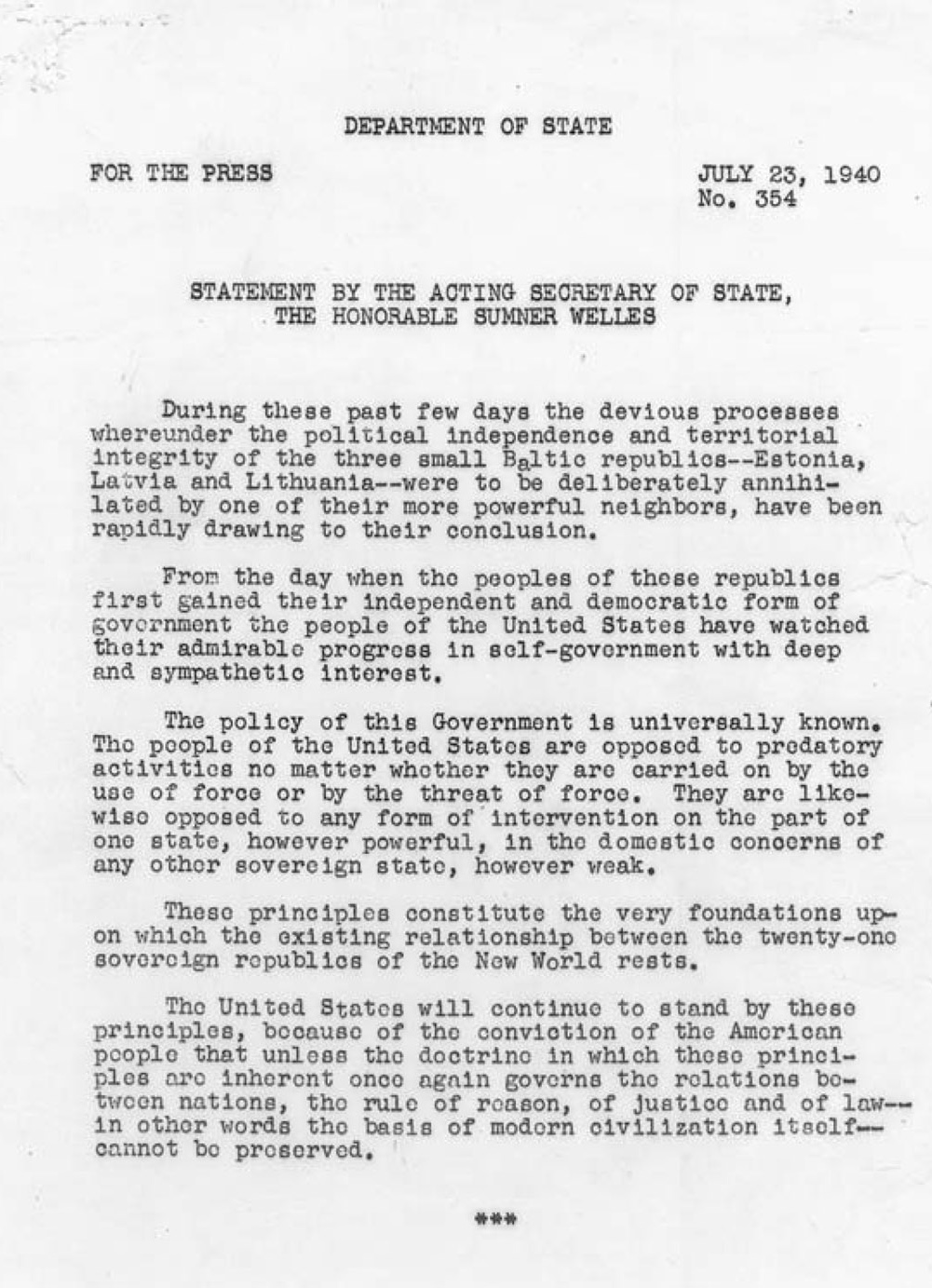
Welles declaration, 23 July 1940, establishing US policy of non-recognition of forced incorporation of the Baltic states

There were three different attitudes in relations to the Baltic states after the coup d'état in Moscow in August 1991. First, there were states which had diplomatic relations before 1940 occupation and they had never recognised the 1940 annexation either de jure or de facto. These states, for the most part, resumed diplomatic relations in 1991 without formal recognition. However, some of states considered necessary to re-recognise the Baltic states. Second, there were states which had diplomatic relations before 1940, but had recognised their annexation into the Soviet Union as fait accompli. Third, there were new states emerged after 1940.

The United States position was originally based on the Stimson Doctrine applied to the Occupation and annexation of the Baltic states by the Welles Declaration.

The legal continuity of the three Baltic states relies in big part on the Stimson Doctrine applied to the 1940 Soviet invasion, occupation and annexation of the Baltic states by the Welles Declaration. The Declaration enabled the Baltic states Estonia, Latvia and Lithuania to maintain independent diplomatic missions to the US, and the Executive Order 8484 protected Baltic financial assets between 1940-1991.

This policy of non-recognition gave rise to the principle of legal continuity, which held that de jure, the Baltic states remained independent states under illegal occupation throughout the period 1940–91.

=== Soviet Union and Russian Federation ===
The last General Secretary of the Communist Party of the Soviet Union Mikhail Gorbachev established a 26-member Commission to evaluate the Molotov–Ribbentrop Pact and its Secret Protocols. The Commission agreed that the Pact existed and its content was contrary to Baltic–Soviet treaties. The Commission was not able to reach consensus on the effects of the pact, since it would open the possibility to Baltic exit from the Soviet Union. The issue has not been discussed in the Russian Federation since the report of the Commission in 1989. Contemporary Russian Federation has refused to be bound pre-1940 agreements which the Soviet Union had entered with either Estonia, Latvia, or Lithuania. The Ministry of Foreign Affairs of Russia has announced that the distortion of history and allegations of unlawful occupations are the main reasons for the problems in the Baltics–Russia relations.

At the same time, the Russian Federation claims that it continues as the legal personality of the former Soviet Union. However, Russia claims that it did not inherit the obligations of the Soviet Union automatically. The decisions on continuity were made on a case by case basis and the Russian Federation weighted carefully the degree to which the continuity was its interest, especially in the field of bilateral relations and debts.

=== European Court of Human Rights ===
Following the admission of post-Soviet states into the Council of Europe in the second half of the 1990s, a number of cases related to the question of the legality of the Baltic states' membership in the Soviet Union were brought before the European Court of Human Rights. The Court made a number of rulings that affirmed the Baltic states were occupied and forcibly incorporated into the Soviet Union until 1991.

On 16 March 2006 the Grand Chamber of the Court made the following statement in the case of Tatjana Ždanoka vs Latvia (paragraph 119 of its judgment):

Latvia, together with the other Baltic States, lost its independence in 1940 in the aftermath of the partition of Europe between Germany and the USSR agreed by Adolf Hitler's Germany and Joseph Stalin's Soviet Union by way of the secret protocol to the Molotov-Ribbentrop Pact, an agreement contrary to the generally recognised principles of international law. The ensuing annexation of Latvia by the Soviet Union was orchestrated and conducted under the authority of the Communist Party of the Soviet Union (CPSU), the Communist Party of Latvia (CPL) being a satellite branch of the CPSU.

Subsequently to Ždanoka, a number of other judgments and decisions were adopted by Chambers (smaller formations) of the Court in cases regarding issues ranging from the restriction of political rights of former Soviet politicians to criminal conviction for crimes against humanity, whereby the Court noted that illegal occupation of the Baltic States by the USSR had taken place in 1940 (see Kolk vs Estonia, Penart vs Estonia). In Penart vs Estonia, the Court declared inadmissible an application by a former USSR internal security service operative Vladimir Penart, convicted of crimes against humanity by an Estonian court for organizing the killing of "a person hiding in the woods" most probably a member of the Forest Brothers, a militant anti-Soviet movement in 1953. The court stated following:

The Court notes, first, that Estonia lost its independence as a result of the Treaty of Non-Aggression between Germany and the Union of Soviet Socialist Republics (also known as "Molotov-Ribbentrop Pact"), concluded on 23 August 1939, and the secret additional protocols to it. Following an ultimatum to set up Soviet military bases in Estonia in 1939, a large-scale entry of the Soviet army into Estonia took place in June 1940. The lawful government of the country was overthrown and Soviet rule was imposed by force. The totalitarian communist regime of the Soviet Union conducted large-scale and systematic actions against the Estonian population, including, for example, the deportation of about 10,000 persons on 14 June 1941 and of more than 20,000 on 25 March 1949. After the Second World War, tens of thousands of persons went into hiding in the forests to avoid repression by the Soviet authorities; part of those in hiding actively resisted the occupation regime. According to the data of the security organs, about 1,500 persons were killed and almost 10,000 arrested in the course of the resistance movement of 1944–1953. Interrupted by the German occupation in 1941–1944, Estonia remained occupied by the Soviet Union until its restoration of independence in 1991. Accordingly, Estonia as a state was temporarily prevented from fulfilling its international commitments.

The court's rulings appear favorable to several aspects, which are important with regard to restoration of the Baltic states including the legal continuity doctrine. The rulings confirmed that the USSR committed crimes in the illegally occupied Baltic states such as Soviet deportations from Estonia and, in case Tatjana Ždanoka vs Latvia, drew parallels between legal treatment of the German Waffen SS and hardline elements of the Communist Party of the Soviet Union.

In the Russian Federation rulings of the court caused negative reaction among politicians and were characterized as "politicized."

In the Baltic states the court rulings were accepted within the general lines of the Western non-recognition policy (see Stimson Doctrine). Notably, the Estonian Internal Security Service emphasized the importance of the decisions in its 2006 yearbook.

== See also ==
- Baltic States Investigation by the US House of Representatives (1953)
- Succession of states
