= Executive Order 8484 =

1940 United States executive order

Executive Order 8484, issued on July 10, 1940, by U.S. President Franklin D. Roosevelt, was one of a series of amendments to Executive Order 8389.

Order 8389, issued on April 10, 1940, had frozen Norwegian and Danish financial assets held in the U.S., following their occupation by Nazi Germany during World War II. Order 8484 extended the same protection to the assets of Estonia, Latvia, and Lithuania after their occupation and annexation by the Soviet Union.

== Text of Order ==
By virtue of the authority vested in me by Section 5(b) of the Act of October 6, 1917 (40 Stat.411, as amended), and by virtue of all other authority vested in me, I, FRANKLIN D. ROOSEVELT, PRESIDENT OF THE UNITED STATES OF AMERICA, do hereby amend Executive Order No. 8389, as amended, so to extend all the provisions thereof, and with respect to, property in which Latvia, Estonia, or Lithuania or any national thereof has at any time on or since July 10, 1940, had any interest or any nature whatsoever, direct or indirect.

== Response ==
The Soviet government condemned the freezing of the Baltic states' assets, asserting that there was no legal basis for suspending the transfer. Sumner Welles, acting Secretary of State, addressed the objection in a statement:

The attempt to transfer the gold belonging to the Banks of Lithuania, Latvia, and Estonia was made at a time when it had become apparent that the governments and peoples of those countries were being deprived of freedom of action by foreign troops which had entered their territories by force or threats of force.

In conjunction with the Welles declaration, Executive Order 8484 and its enforcement by the Treasury Department offered both immediate and long-term benefits to the Baltic states.
