= Executive Order 8389 =

United States executive order issued during WW II

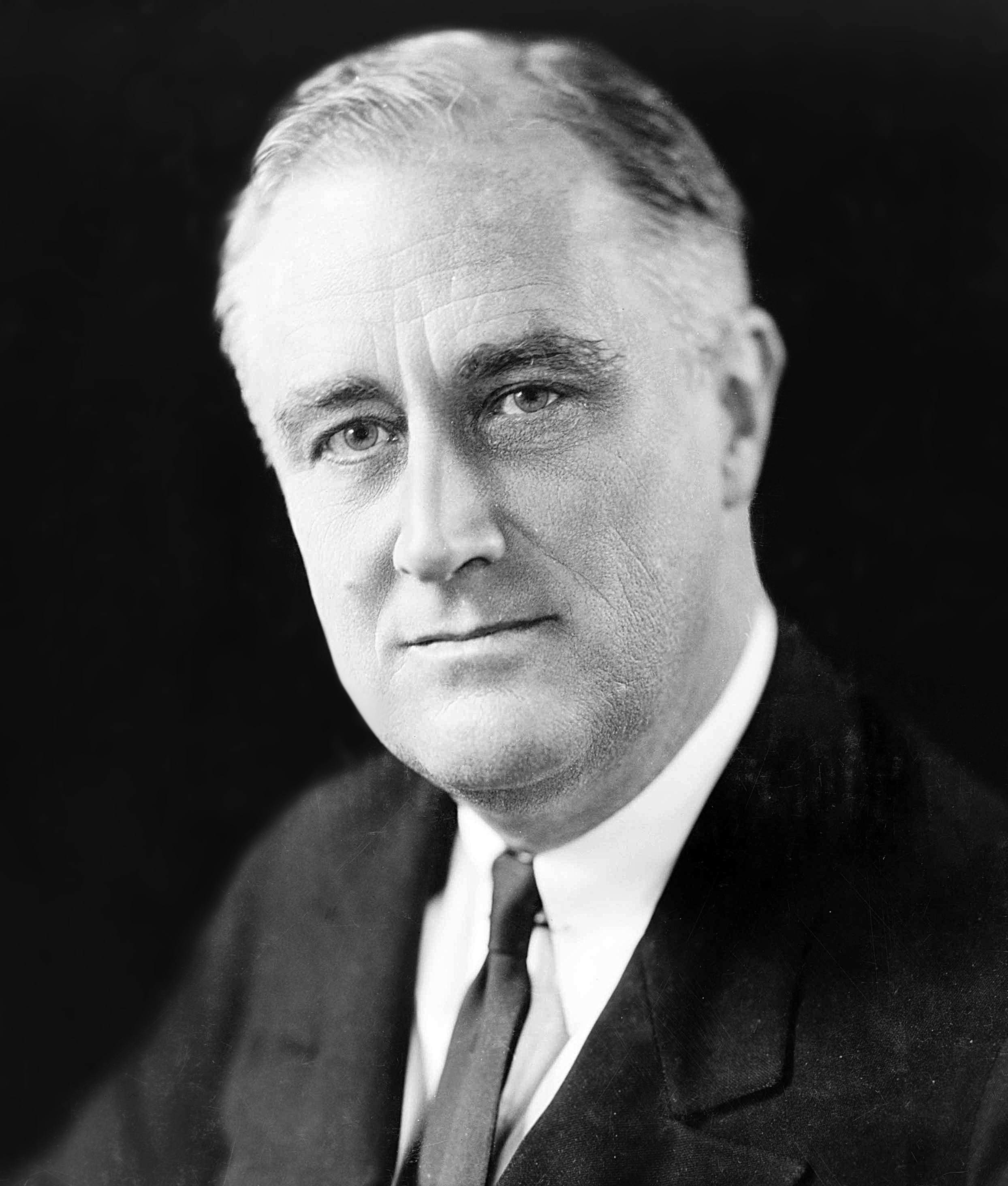
Franklin D. Roosevelt's Executive Order offered practical assistance to occupied nations

Executive Order 8389 Protecting Funds of Victims of Aggression was issued by U.S. President Franklin D. Roosevelt on April 10, 1940, following the invasions of Denmark and Norway by Nazi Germany.

== Implementation ==
One of the primary concerns of the U.S. government in the early years of World War II was to prevent the Nazis from using the financial resources of the United States to finance their military campaigns and occupation costs. The task of enforcing this goal by controlling financial assets fell to the US Treasury Department, and President Roosevelt enabled its actions by issuing Executive Order 8389 on April 10, 1940, which froze Norwegian and Danish assets in the United States. As precedent, Roosevelt invoked an act of October 6, 1917, and Executive Order 6560 of January 15, 1934.

In doing so, Roosevelt not only offered symbolic support to the occupied nations of Europe, but also guaranteed future practical assistance by assuring that the assets of such states would be returned once the aggressors were defeated. The Order, initially ruling only on Norwegian and Danish assets, was later amended to include those of most European states, with the notable exemption of Great Britain. The subsequent amendments were filed under separate Order numbers.

After the occupation and annexation of the Baltic States (Estonia, Latvia and Lithuania) by the Soviet Union, Order 8389 was amended via Executive Order 8484 on 15 July 1940 to include those states. The Soviet government condemned the freezing of the Baltic states' assets, asserting that there was no legal basis for suspending the transfer. Sumner Welles, acting Secretary of State, addressed the objection in a statement:

The attempt to transfer the gold belonging to the Banks of Lithuania, Latvia, and Estonia was made at a time when it had become apparent that the governments and peoples of those countries were being deprived of freedom of action by foreign troops which had entered their territories by force or threats of force.

Prior to the inclusion of Estonia, Latvia, and Lithuania, all the other European states affected by the Order had come under the military occupation of Nazi Germany. In conjunction with the Welles declaration, Executive Order 8484 and its enforcement by the Treasury Department offered both immediate and long-term benefits to the Baltic states.

A postcard was sent in 1940 by a German Company in Germany to a firm in New York. In the postcard there is a mention of Munich Reich Bank, that triggered application of this Roosevelt Executive order. Upon arrival to the US this marking was added: "SUPPOSED TO CONTAIN MATTER SUBJECT TO THE PROVISIONS OF EXECUTIVED ORDER 8389 AS AMENDED." The German firm was Wackerchemic of Munich and the PC was sent to Sager & Malcolm in NYC.
