= Stimson Doctrine =

20th-century U.S. foreign policy

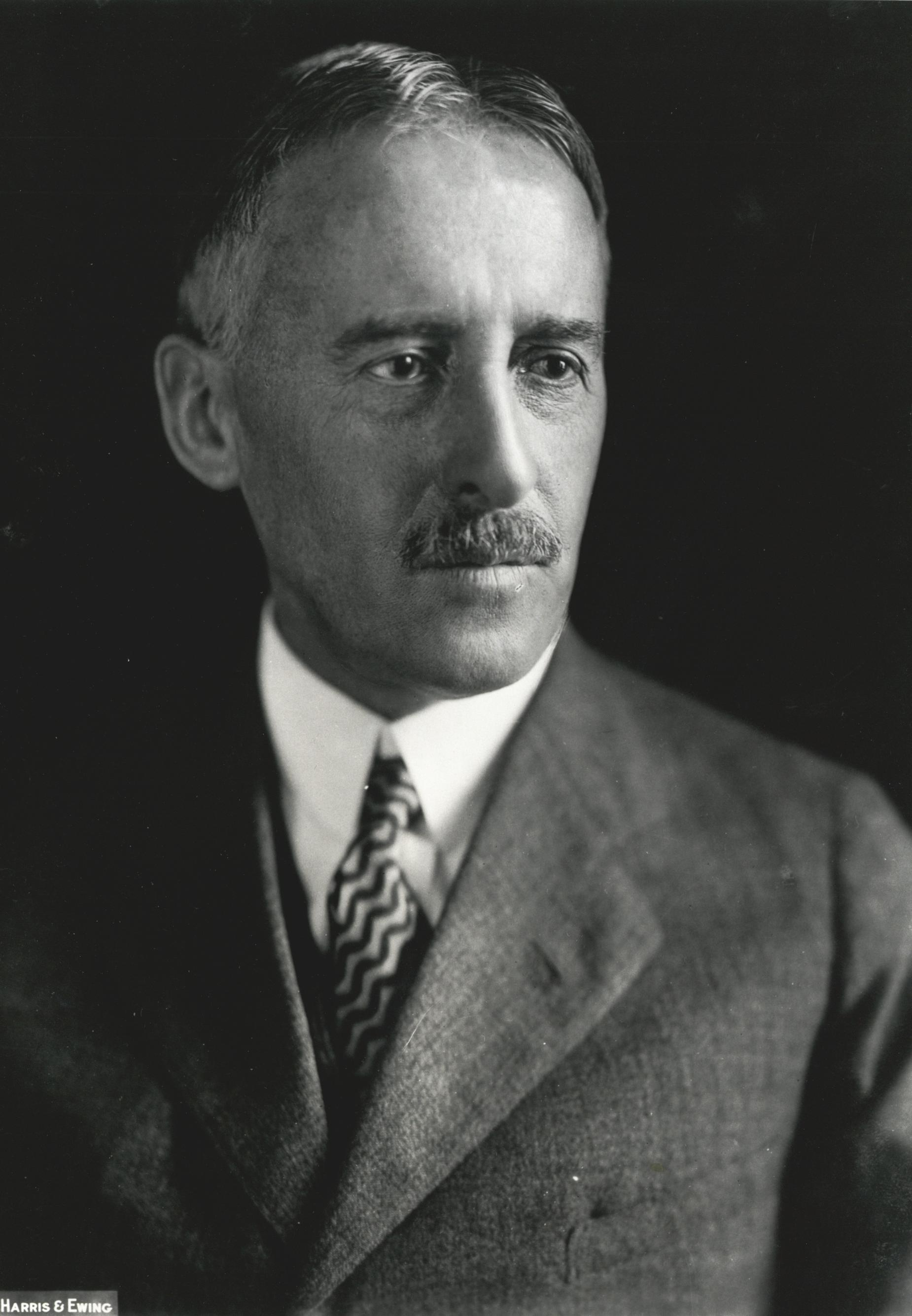
- Henry Stimson
- Date: January 7, 1932
- Location: United States
- Type: Non-recognition of territorial changes executed by military force
- Cause: Mukden Incident and the Japanese invasion of Manchuria
- Target: Empire of Japan / Manchukuo
- Participants: United States; League of Nations
- Outcome: Deepened U.S.–Japan friction; Exposed League of Nations weakness; Later codified into post-WWII law

The Stimson Doctrine is the policy of nonrecognition of states created as a result of a war of aggression. The policy was implemented by the United States government, enunciated in a note of January 7, 1932, to the Empire of Japan and the Republic of China, of nonrecognition of international territorial changes imposed by force. The doctrine was an application of the principle of ex injuria jus non oritur. Since the entry into force of the United Nations Charter, international law scholars have argued that states are under a legal obligation not to recognize annexations as legitimate, however, unless a Security Council resolution mandates non-recognition, this view has since become controversial on charges of inconsistent application of the duty.

== History ==
Named after Henry L. Stimson, U.S. Secretary of State in the Herbert Hoover administration (1929–1933), the policy followed Japan's unilateral seizure of Manchuria in northeastern China following action by Japanese soldiers in Shenyang on September 18, 1931. The doctrine was also invoked by U.S. Undersecretary of State Sumner Welles in the Welles Declaration on July 23, 1940, which announced nonrecognition of the Soviet annexation and incorporation of the three Baltic states: Estonia, Latvia, and Lithuania. This remained the official U.S. position until the Baltic states regained independence in 1991.

It was not the first time that the U.S. had used nonrecognition as a political tool or symbolic statement. President Woodrow Wilson had refused to recognize the Mexican Revolutionary governments in 1913 and Japan's Twenty-One Demands upon China in 1915.

The Japanese invasion of Manchuria in late 1931 placed Stimson in a difficult position. It was evident that appeals to the spirit of the Kellogg–Briand Pact had no impact on either the Chinese or the Japanese, and Stimson was further hampered by President Herbert Hoover's clear indication that he would not support economic sanctions as a means to bring peace in the Far East.

On January 7, 1932, Stimson sent similar notes to China and Japan that incorporated a diplomatic approach that had been used by earlier secretaries facing crises in the Far East. Later known as the Stimson Doctrine or sometimes the Hoover-Stimson Doctrine the notes read in part as follows:

[T]he American Government deems it to be its duty to notify both the Imperial Japanese Government and the Government of the Chinese Republic that it cannot admit the legality of any situation de facto nor does it intend to recognize any treaty or agreement entered into between those Governments, or agents thereof, which may impair the treaty rights of the United States or its citizens in China, including those that relate to the sovereignty, the independence, or the territorial and administrative integrity of the Republic of China, or to the international policy relative to China, commonly known as the open door policy; and that it does not intend to recognize any situation, treaty, or agreement which may be brought about by means contrary to the covenants and obligations of the Pact of Paris of August 27th, 1928, to which treaty both China and Japan as well as the United States are parties.

Stimson had stated that the U.S. would not recognize any changes made in China that would curtail American treaty rights in the area, that the "open door" must be maintained, and would refuse any legitimacy to territorial changes made in violation of the 1928 Pact. The declaration had few material effects on the Western world, which was burdened by the Great Depression, and Japan went on to establish a puppet state in Manchuria, Philippine, Vietnam and later bomb Shanghai. The doctrine was criticized on the grounds that its only effect was to alienate the Japanese.

The Stimson Doctrine, originally intended only as a political declaration, attracted the attention of the League of Nations, which adopted a resolution on March 11, 1932, that "it is incumbent upon members of the League of Nations not to recognize any situation, treaty or agreement which may be brought about by means contrary to the Covenant of the League of Nations or the Pact of Paris." It also acquired legal force for the members of the Organization of American States after it was included in the Saavedra Lamas Treaty and the Montevideo Convention of 1933, later followed by the Charter of the Organization of American States of 1948.

The doctrine has become more important especially in ensuring compliance with international law since the Second World War with resolution (375) passed by the UN General Assembly, with institutionalization stemming from the 1969 Vienna Convention on the Law of Treaties in regard to "[a] treaty['s] conclusion [that] has been procured by the threat or use of force in violation of the principles of international law embodied in the Charter of the United Nations" in Article 52 of the UN Charter, wherein the meaning of "force" "was unanimously agreed to include military force", finding application, for instance, in the case of Rhodesia in 1965.

After the entry into force of the UN Charter, international law establishes a general prohibition on the use of force. Consequently, international legal doctrine argues that annexations are illegal, and states are under a legal obligation to comply with the Stimson Doctrine by not recognizing as legitimate territorial changes made through annexations. Barring that "[i]n many of the worst crises that have confronted the international community in recent years, a statement refusing to recognise the legality of any consequences of the aggressor party’s actions has often been one of the first reactions of the UN Security Council", this view has since been criticized for lacking "any instances" of consistent application of the duty. However, according to international studies student Jean Paul Moinet, "it was already noted in the previous sub-section that there are many treaties and other legal instruments that envisage a duty not to recognize as legal a situation brought about by the violation of international law" and that "[the resolutions] may merely coordinate the action of third States so to render the response of the international community as effective as possible."

== See also ==
- Wilsonianism

== Bibliography ==
- Clauss, Errol MacGregor. "The Roosevelt Administration and Manchukuo, 1933–1941," Historian (Aug. 1970) Volume 32, Issue 4, pages 595–611 online
- Current, Richard N. "The Stimson Doctrine and the Hoover Doctrine," American Historical Review Vol. 59, No. 3 (Apr., 1954), pp. 513–542 in JSTOR
- Findling, J. E. (1980). Dictionary of American Diplomatic History, Westport: Greenwood Press, pp. 457–458.
- Meiertöns, Heiko (2010): The Doctrines of US Security Policy - An Evaluation under International Law, Cambridge University Press, ISBN 978-0-521-76648-7.
- Wright, Quincy. "The Legal Foundation of the Stimson Doctrine," Pacific Affairs Vol. 8, No. 4 (Dec., 1935), pp. 439–446 in JSTOR
