= Ultimatums to the Baltic governments =

Ultimatums to the Baltic governments may refer to:

- Ultimatums to Estonia:
- Ultimatums to Latvia:
- Ultimatums to Lithuania:
1. 1938 Polish ultimatum to Lithuania
2. 1939 German ultimatum to Lithuania
3. 1940 Soviet ultimatum to Lithuania
