= Sumner Welles =

American diplomat (1892–1961)

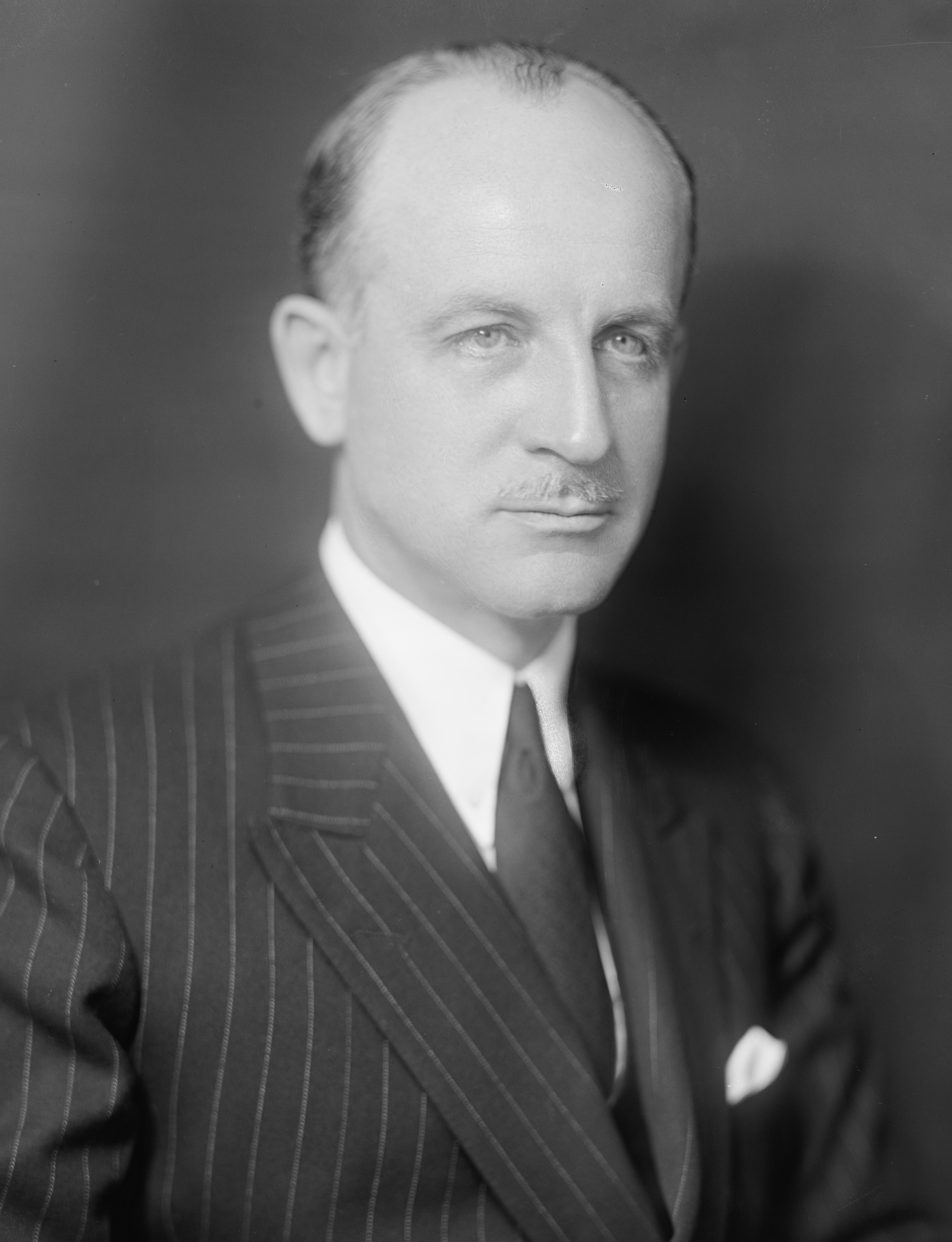

11th United States Under Secretary of State
- In office May 21, 1937 – September 30, 1943
- President: Franklin D. Roosevelt
- Preceded by: William Phillips
- Succeeded by: Edward Stettinius Jr.

United States Ambassador to Cuba
- In office April 24, 1933 – December 13, 1933
- President: Franklin D. Roosevelt
- Preceded by: Harry Frank Guggenheim
- Succeeded by: Jefferson Caffery

Personal details
- Born: Benjamin Sumner Welles III; October 14, 1892 New York City, U.S.
- Died: September 24, 1961 (aged 68) Bernardsville, New Jersey, U.S.
- Resting place: Rock Creek Cemetery, Washington, D.C., U.S.
- Spouses: Esther "Hope" Slater (m. 1915; div. 1923); Mathilde Scott Townsend (m. 1925; died 1949); Harriette Appleton Post (m. 1952)
- Children: 2
- Parents: Benjamin Welles; Frances Wyeth Swan
- Occupation: Diplomat; government official

Benjamin Sumner Welles III (October 14, 1892 – September 24, 1961) was an American government official and diplomat. He was a major foreign policy adviser to President Franklin D. Roosevelt and served as Under Secretary of State from 1937 to 1943, during Roosevelt's presidency.

Born in New York City to a wealthy, well-connected political family, Welles graduated from Harvard College in 1914. He entered the Foreign Service at the advice of Franklin Roosevelt, who was a family friend. Welles was excited by Woodrow Wilson's ideas about how American principles could reorder the international system based on liberal democracy, free-trade capitalism, international law, a league of nations, and an end to colonialism.

Welles specialized in Latin American diplomatic affairs and served several posts in Washington and in the field. President Calvin Coolidge distrusted Welles because of his divorce, and dismissed him from the foreign service. Welles left public service for some years, and wrote a book on the history of the Dominican Republic.

When Roosevelt was elected president in 1932, he put Welles in charge of Latin American affairs as Assistant Secretary of State for Latin American Affairs. Welles became heavily involved in negotiations that removed Cuban president Gerardo Machado from power and replaced him with rival Carlos Manuel de Céspedes y Quesada. He was later promoted to Under Secretary of State, in which role he continued to be active in Latin American issues, but also expanded into European affairs as World War II began in Europe in 1939. In 1940, he issued the Welles Declaration which condemned Soviet occupation of the Baltic states and proved to be a minor point of contention among the Soviets and their Western allies once the U.S. entered the war in 1941. After the fall of France, he downgraded French affairs because they no longer were a major power. Roosevelt relied on Welles much more than on the official Secretary of State, Cordell Hull, who became the enemy of Welles.

Welles was forced out of government service by Secretary Hull after his enemies began to spread word of a 1943 incident in which he had propositioned two male railroad porters for sex. Returning to private life, he continued to write books on foreign relations and became an advisor to media organizations. He was a target of the House Un-American Activities Committee during the post-war "red scare", though he was never formally sanctioned. He died in New Jersey in 1961, survived by his third wife and two children from his first marriage.

== Early life ==
Benjamin Sumner Welles III was born on October 14, 1892, in New York City to Benjamin Sumner Welles Jr. and Frances Wyeth Swan. His elder sister was Emily Frances Welles, who married Harry Pelham Robbins. He preferred to be called "Sumner" after his famous relative Charles Sumner, a leading Senator from Massachusetts during the American Civil War and Reconstruction. His family was wealthy and was connected to the era's most prominent families. He was a grandnephew of Caroline Schermerhorn Astor, known as "the Mrs. Astor". Among his ancestors were Thomas Welles, a colonial Governor of Connecticut, and Increase Sumner, Governor of Massachusetts from 1797 to 1799. Although the two men were occasionally mistaken for cousins, Welles was no relation to director Orson Welles.

The Welles family was also connected to the Roosevelts. His first cousin once removed Helen Schermerhorn Astor married James Roosevelt Roosevelt, half-brother of future President Franklin D. Roosevelt (FDR). At the age of 10, Welles was entered in Miss Kearny's Day School for Boys in New York City. In September 1904, he entered Groton School in Massachusetts, where he remained for six years. There he roomed with Hall Roosevelt, the brother of Eleanor Roosevelt. In March 1905 at the age of 12 Welles served as a page at Franklin D. Roosevelt's wedding to Eleanor.

Welles attended Harvard College where he studied "economics, Iberian literature and culture", and graduated after three years in 1914.

== Diplomatic career ==
After graduating from Harvard, Welles followed the advice of Franklin Delano Roosevelt and joined the U.S. Foreign Service. A New York Times profile described him while he joined the foreign service: "Tall, slender, blond, and always correctly tailored, he concealed a natural shyness under an appearance of dignified firmness. Although intolerant of inefficiency, he brought to bear unusual tact and a self-imposed patience." He secured an assignment to Tokyo, where he served in the embassy as third secretary only briefly.

=== Latin America ===
Welles soon became a specialist in Latin American affairs. He served in Buenos Aires, Argentina, in 1919 and became fluent in Spanish. In 1921, Secretary of State Charles Evans Hughes appointed him to head the Division of Latin American Affairs.

In March 1922, Welles briefly resigned from the State Department. He was unsympathetic to the view held by American diplomacy that military might was meant to protect the overseas interests of U.S. business. Hughes brought him back the next year as a special commissioner to the Dominican Republic. His particular assignment was to oversee the withdrawal of U.S. forces and to negotiate protection for overseas investors in the Dominican Republic's debt. Welles remained in that post for three years and his work was accomplished after his departure in a 1924 treaty.

In 1924, U.S. President Calvin Coolidge sent Welles to act as mediator between disputing parties in Honduras. The country had lacked a legitimate government since the election of 1923 failed to produce a majority for any candidate and the legislature had failed to exercise its power to appoint a new president. Negotiations managed by Welles from April 23 to 28 produced an interim government under General Vicente Tosta, who promised to appoint a cabinet representing all factions and to schedule a presidential election as soon as possible in which he would not be a candidate. Negotiations ended with the signing of an agreement aboard the USS Milwaukee in the port of Amapala.

=== Years out of government service ===
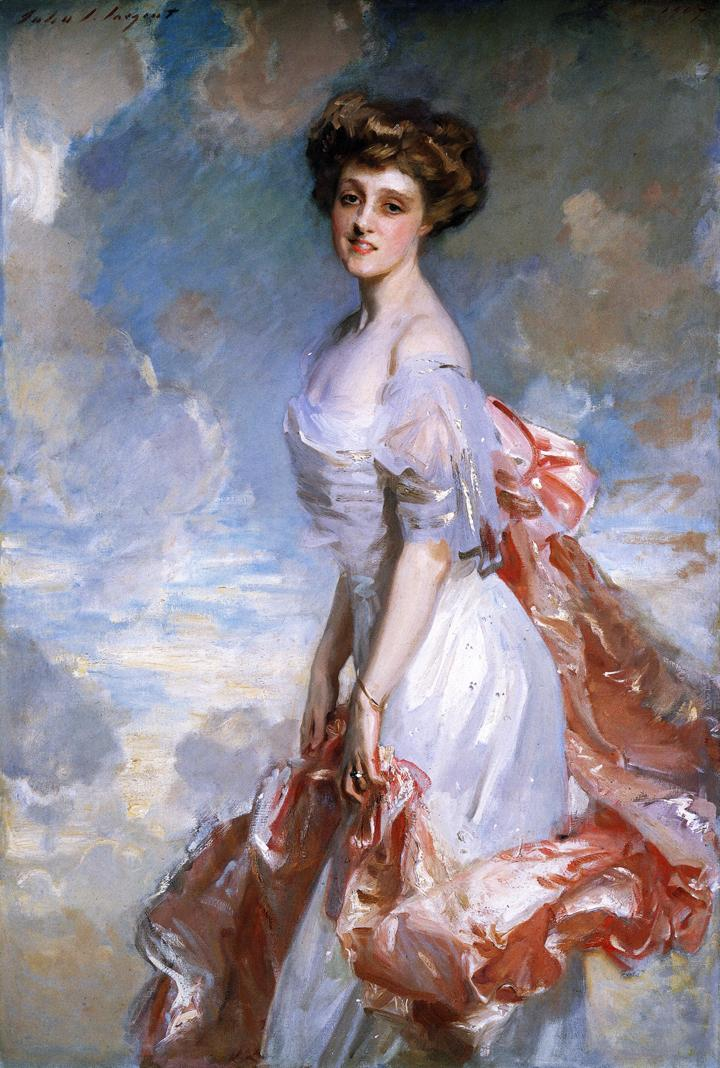
Miss Mathilde Townsend, John Singer Sargent, 1907

Coolidge, however, disapproved of Welles's 1925 marriage to Mathilde Scott Townsend, who had only recently divorced the President's friend, Senator Peter Gerry of Rhode Island. He promptly ended Welles's diplomatic career.

Welles then retired to his estate at Oxon Hill, Maryland. He devoted himself to writing and his two-volume history of the Dominican Republic, Naboth's Vineyard: The Dominican Republic, 1844–1924 appeared in 1928. Time described the work as "a ponderous, lifeless, two-volume work which was technically a history of Santo Domingo, actually a careful indictment of U.S. foreign policy in the Hemisphere". James Reston summarized its thesis: "we should keep in our own back yard and stop claiming rights for ourselves that we denied to other sovereign States".

He served as an unofficial adviser to Dominican President Horacio Vásquez.

During the presidential election of 1932, Welles provided foreign policy expertise to the Roosevelt campaign. He was a major contributor to the campaign as well.

=== Cuba ===
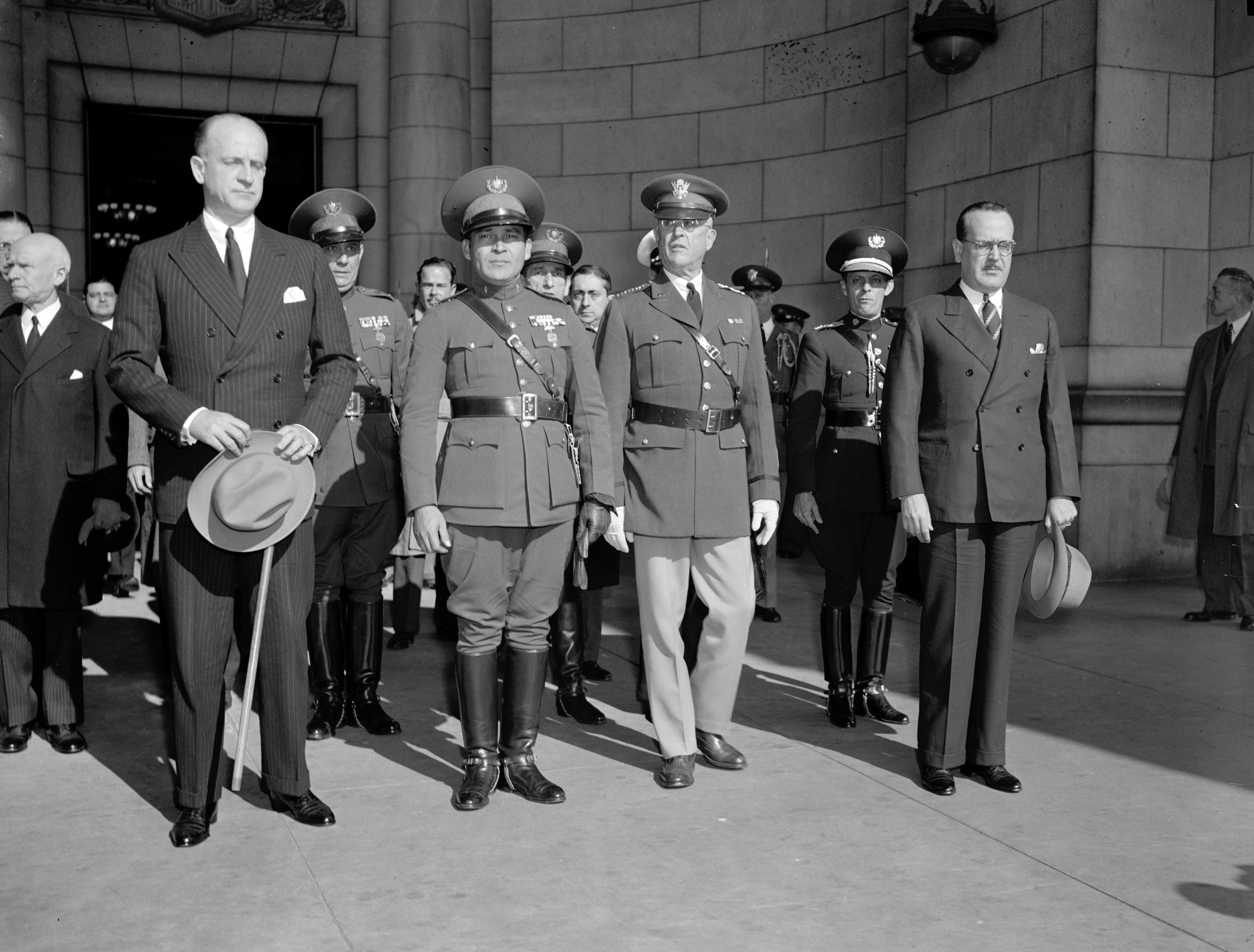
Welles, holding hat at left, greeting Cuba's Fulgencio Batista at Union Station, Washington, D.C., on November 10, 1938

In April 1933, FDR appointed Welles Assistant Secretary of State for Latin American Affairs, but when a revolution in Cuba against President Gerardo Machado left its government divided and uncertain, he became instead the President's special envoy to Cuba. He arrived in Havana in May 1933. His mission was to negotiate a settlement so that the U.S. could avoid intervening as U.S. law, namely the Platt Amendment of 1901, required.

Welles speaking in a newsreel report on the Panama conference September 18, 1939

His instructions were to mediate "in any form most suitable" an end to the Cuban situation. Welles promised Machado a new commercial treaty to relieve economic distress if Machado reached a political settlement with his opponents, Colonel Dr. Cosme de la Torriente, from the Nationalist Union; Joaquín Martínez Sáenz, for ABC; Nicasio Silveira, for the Revolutionary Radical Cellular Organization; and Dr. Manuel Dorta-Duque, representing the delegation of the University of Havana. Machado believed the U.S. would help him survive politically. Welles promised the opponents of Machado's government a change of government and participation in the subsequent administration, if they joined the mediation process and supported an orderly transfer of power. One crucial step was persuading Machado to issue an amnesty for political prisoners so that the opposition leaders could appear in public. Machado soon lost faith in Welles and denounced U.S. interference as a colonialist adventure. Welles' mediation process conferred political legitimacy on sectors of the opposition that participated and allowed the U.S. to assess their viability as long-term political allies. Unable to influence Machado, Welles met with Rafael Guas Inclan, president of the Chamber of Representatives, at the home of newspaper publisher Alfredo Hornedo, and requested that he initiate impeachment proceedings against the president. When Guas harshly rebuffed him, Welles then negotiated an end to his presidency, with support from General Alberto Herrera, Colonels Julio Sanguily, Rafael del Castillo, and Erasmo Delgado after threatening U.S. intervention under the Platt Amendment and the restructuring of the Cuban army high command.

In 1937, FDR promoted Welles to Under Secretary, and the Senate promptly confirmed the appointment. Indicative of ongoing rivalries within the State Department, Robert Walton Moore, an ally of Secretary of State Hull was appointed the department's Counselor at the same time, a position equal in rank to that of Under Secretary.

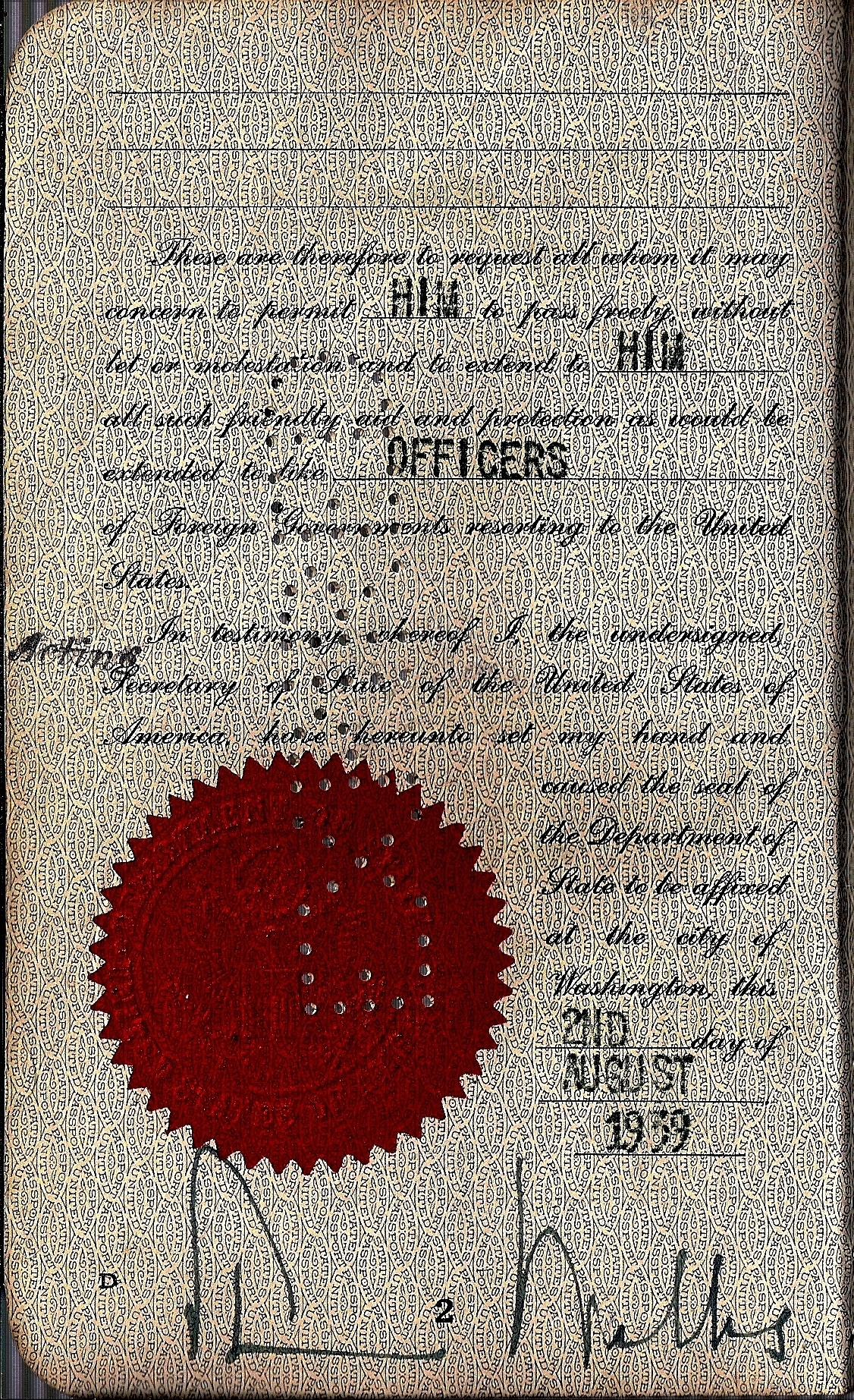
1939 hand signed issued passport by under Secretary of State Sumner Welles

=== World War II ===
In the week following Kristallnacht, in November 1938, the British government offered to give the major part of its quota of 65,000 British citizens eligible for emigration to the United States to Jews fleeing Hitler. Under-Secretary Welles opposed this idea, as he later recounted:

I reminded the Ambassador that the President stated there was no intention on the part of his government to increase the quota for German nationals. I added that it was my strong impression that the responsible leaders among American Jews would be the first to urge that no change in the present quota for German Jews be made. ... The influential Sam Rosenman, one of the "responsible" Jewish leaders sent Roosevelt a memorandum telling him that an "increase of quotas is wholly inadvisable. It will merely produce a 'Jewish problem' in the countries increasing the quota."

Welles headed the American delegation to the 21-nation Pan American conference that met in Panama in September 1939. He said the conference had been planned in earlier hemispheric meetings in Buenos Aires and Lima and he emphasized the need for consultation on economic issues to "cushion the shock of the dislocation of inter-American commerce arising from the war" in Europe.

In February and March 1940 Welles visited Vatican City, Italy, Germany, and France; (he visited President Albert Lebrun on March 7) and England to receive and discuss German peacemaking proposals. Hitler feared that the purpose of his visits was to drive a wedge between Germany and Italy.

Throughout the summer and fall of 1942, antisemitic officials in the State Department suppressed early reports that the Nazis had decided to destroy European Jewry. Welles quietly investigated these reports between September and November, soliciting reports from American officials in Europe, the International Red Cross, and the Vatican. Finally, on November 24, 1942, Welles became the first senior American leader to disclose to the outside world that the U.S. government had become convinced that Hitler intended to exterminate Europe's Jews. He passed this information to Rabbi Stephen Samuel Wise, who announced it to the press later that day.

=== Soviet occupation of the Baltics ===
On July 23, 1940, following the principles of the Stimson Doctrine, Welles issued a statement that became known as the Welles Declaration. In the Molotov–Ribbentrop Pact of August 23, 1939, Germany agreed to allow the Soviet Union to occupy and annex the three Baltic states of Estonia, Latvia, and Lithuania. Welles condemned those actions and refused to recognize the legitimacy of Soviet rule in those countries. More than 50 countries later followed the U.S. in this position.

The declaration was a source of contention during the subsequent alliance between the Americans, the British, and the Soviets, but Welles persistently defended the declaration. In a discussion with the media, he asserted that the Soviets had maneuvered to give "an odor of legality to acts of aggression for purposes of the record."

In a 1942 memorandum describing his conversations with British Ambassador Lord Halifax, Welles stated that he would have preferred to characterize the plebiscites supporting the annexations as "faked." In April 1942, he wrote that the annexation was "not only indefensible from every moral standpoint, but likewise extraordinarily stupid." He believed any concession on the Baltic issue would set a precedent that would lead to additional border struggles in eastern Poland and elsewhere.

=== Rivalries ===
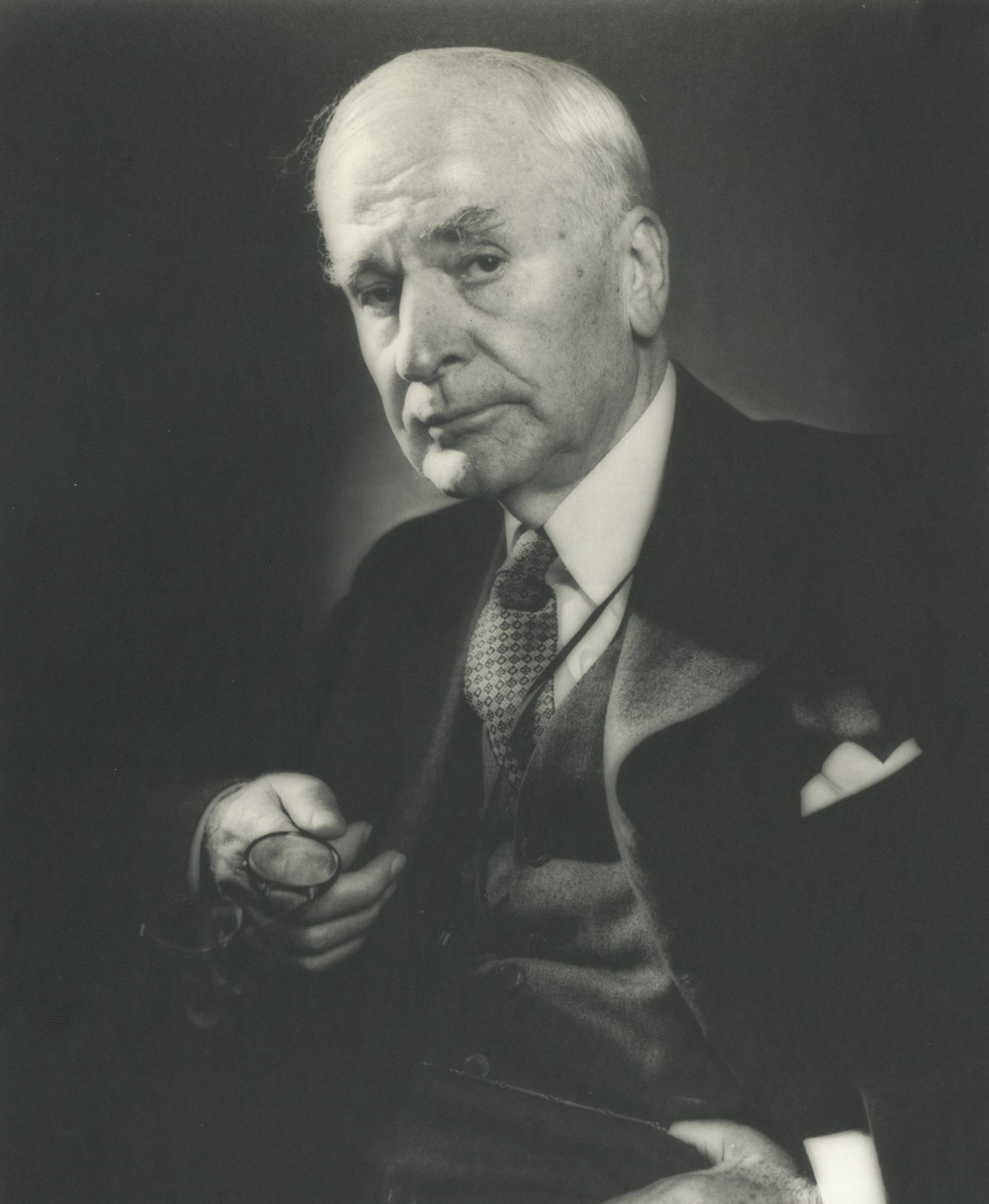
Cordell Hull Secretary of State, 1933–1944

A New York Times profile described Welles in 1941: "Tall and erect, never without his cane, ... he has enough dignity to be Viceroy of India and ... enough influence in this critical era to make his ideas, principles, and dreams count."

He appeared on the cover of Time on August 11, 1941, and in that issue Time assessed Welles's role within Hull's Department of State:

Sumner Welles is one of the very few career men ever to become Under Secretary of State, and as matters now stand may eventually become Secretary ... Grave, saintly Mr. Hull, never an expert at paper-shuffling, has long left the actual administration of the Department to his chief aide, Sumner Welles. And Cordell Hull may choose not to retire. But even if Welles never becomes Secretary, he will still hold his present power: through Presidential choice, his own ability, background and natural stamina, he is the chief administrative officer of U.S. foreign policy.

Roosevelt was always close to Welles and made him the central figure in the State Department, much to the chagrin of secretary Cordell Hull, who could not be removed because he had a powerful political base.

The clash became more public in mid-1943, when Time reported "a flare-up of long-smoldering hates and jealousies in the State Department". After Welles was forced out of office, journalists noted that two men who shared "aims and goals" were at odds because of a "clash of temperament and ambitions".

=== Resignation ===
Welles was a closeted bisexual. In September 1940, Welles accompanied Roosevelt to the funeral of former Speaker of the House William B. Bankhead in Huntsville, Alabama. While returning to Washington by train, Welles – who was drunk and under the influence of barbiturates – solicited sex from two male African-American Pullman car porters. Cordell Hull dispatched his confidant, former Ambassador William Bullitt, to provide details of the incident to Republican Senator Owen Brewster of Maine. Brewster, in turn, gave the information to journalist Arthur Krock, a Roosevelt critic; and to Senators Styles Bridges and Burton K. Wheeler. When FBI Director J. Edgar Hoover would not release the file on Welles, Brewster threatened to initiate a senatorial investigation into the incident. (In 1995, Deke DeLoach told C-SPAN's Brian Lamb on Booknotes that file cabinets behind J. Edgar Hoover's secretary Helen Gandy contained two-and-a-half drawers of files, including information about "an undersecretary of state who had committed a homosexual act.") Roosevelt was embittered by the attack on his friend, believing they were ruining a good man, but he was obliged to accept Welles's resignation in 1943. Roosevelt particularly blamed Bullitt; his son Elliott Roosevelt wrote that President Roosevelt believed that Bullitt had bribed the porters to entrap Welles.

In August 1943, reports that Welles had resigned as Under-Secretary of State circulated for more than a week. The press reported it as fact on August 24, despite the lack of an official announcement. Writing in The New York Times, Arthur Krock said that opinion in Washington saw Welles's departure as an attempt to end factionalism in the State Department: "The long-existing struggle disorganized the department, bred Hull and Welles factions among its officials, confused those having business with the department and finally produced pressure on the President to eliminate the causes." Despite the "personal fondness" of the President and his wife for Welles, he continued, the President sided with Hull because supporting a subordinate would promote revolts in other government agencies, Hull was politically connected and popular with Congress, and the Senate, he was told, would not support Welles for Secretary of State or any other office. Krock added a cryptic explanation: "Other incidents arising made the disagreements between the two men even more personal. It was those which aroused the Senate to opposition to Mr. Welles that was reported to the President."

The U.S. still awaits a clarification of its foreign policy and the forced resignation of Sumner Welles made an already murky issue even more obscure.

— Time, September 6, 1943

While Welles vacationed in Bar Harbor, Maine, "where he held to diplomatically correct silence", speculation continued for another month without official word from the White House or the State Department. Observers continued to focus on the Hull–Welles relationship and believed that Hull forced the President to choose between them to end "departmental cleavage". Others read the situation politically and blamed FDR's "appeasement of Southern Democrats". Without confirming his resignation or speaking on the record, Welles indicated he would accept any new assignment the President proposed. Finally, on September 26, 1943, the President announced the resignation of Welles and the appointment of Edward R. Stettinius as the new Under-Secretary of State. He accepted Welles's resignation with regret and explained that Welles was prompted to leave government service because of "his wife's poor health". Welles's letter of resignation was not made public as was customary and one report concluded, "The facts of this situation remained obscure tonight." Time summarized the reaction of the press: "Its endorsement of Sumner Welles was surprisingly widespread, its condemnation of Franklin Roosevelt and Cordell Hull surprisingly severe." It also described the resignation's impact: "In dropping Sumner Welles [Hull] had dropped the chief architect of the US's Good Neighbor Policy in South America, an opponent of those who would do business with Fascists on the basis of expediency, a known and respected advocate of U.S. cooperation in international affairs. The U.S. still awaits a clarification of its foreign policy and the forced resignation of Sumner Welles made an already murky issue even more obscure."

== Later years ==
Welles made his first public appearance following his resignation in October 1943. Speaking to the Foreign Policy Association, he sketched his views of the postwar world, including American participation in a world organization with military capability. He also proposed the creation of regional organizations. He also called on the President to express his opinions and help shape public opinion, praising him at length as "rightly regarded throughout the world as the paladin of the forces of liberal democracy" without once mentioning Hull.

Continuing his career-long focus on Latin America, he said that "if we are to achieve our own security every nation of the Western Hemisphere must also obtain the same ample measure of assurance as ourselves in the world of the future." He also foresaw the end to colonialism as a guiding principle of the new world order:

Can the peaceful, the stable, and the free world for which we hope be created if it is envisioned from the outset as half slave and half free?—if hundreds of millions of human beings are told that they are destined to remain indefinitely under alien subjection? New and powerful nationalistic forces are breaking into life throughout the earth, and in particular in the vast regions of Africa, of the Near East, and of the Far East. Must not these forces, unless they are to be permitted to start new and devastating inundations, be canalized through the channels of liberty into the great stream of constructive and cooperative human endeavor?

In 1944, Welles lent his name to a fundraising campaign by the United Jewish Appeal to bring Jewish refugees from the Balkans to Palestine.

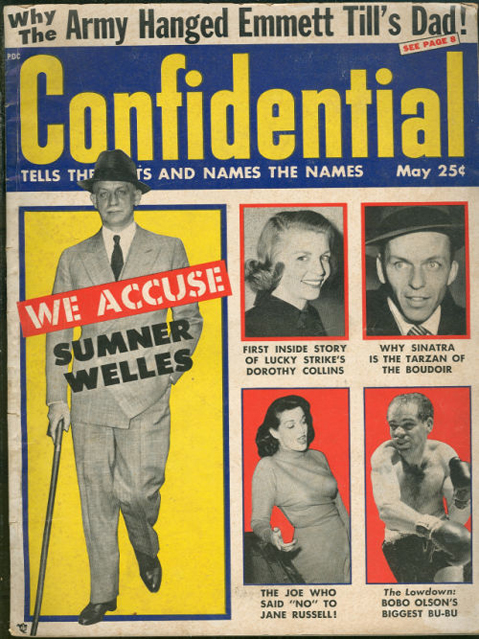
Confidential expose, March 3, 1956

The same year, he wrote The Time for Decision. His proposals for the war's end included modifications in Germany's borders to transfer East Prussia to Poland and to extend Germany's eastern border to include German-speaking populations farther east. Then, he suggested dividing Germany into three states, all of which would be included in a new European customs union. A politically divided Germany would be integrated to an economically cohesive Europe. He also "favoured the transfer of populations to bring ethnic distributions into conformity with international boundaries." With the public engaged in the debate over America's postwar role, The Time for Decision sold half a million copies.

Welles became a prominent commentator and author on foreign affairs. In 1945, he joined the American Broadcasting Company to guide the organization of the "Sumner Welles Peace Forum," a series of four radio broadcasts providing expert commentary on the San Francisco Conference, which wrote the founding document of the United Nations. He undertook a project to edit a series of volumes on foreign relations for Harvard University Press.

In 1948, Welles wrote We Need Not Fail, a short book that first presented a history and evaluated the competing claims to Palestine. He argued that American policy should insist on the fulfillment of the 1947 promise of the United Nations General Assembly to establish two independent states within an economic union and policed by a United Nations force. He criticized American officials whose obsession with the Soviets required submission to Arab and oil interests. Enforcing the decision of the United Nations was his overarching concern because it was an opportunity to establish the organization's role on the international stage that no other interest could trump.

Later that year, the American Jewish Congress presented Welles with a citation that praised his "courageous championing of the cause of Israel among the nations of the world."

On December 7, 1948, Welles appeared before HCUA as part of its investigation into allegations between Whittaker Chambers and Alger Hiss (part of the Hiss Case). Later that month (and after the death of his friend Laurence Duggan), he suffered a serious heart attack.

In April 1950, Senator Joseph McCarthy repeatedly charged that the Institute of Pacific Relations (IPR), an organization that fostered the study of the Far East and the Pacific, was a communist front. Welles was a member of the American branch of the IPR.

He remained always in the public eye. For example, his departure on the Île de France for Europe was noted even as he declined to comment on charges made by McCarthy about communists in the State Department.

He sold his estate outside Washington in 1952, when Oxon Hill Manor became the home of a "huge collection of Americana."

In 1956, Confidential, a scandal magazine, published a report of the 1940 Pullman incident and linked it to his resignation from the State Department, along with additional instances of inappropriate sexual behavior or drunkenness. Welles had explained the 1940 incident to his family as nothing more than drunken conversation with the train staff. His son Benjamin Welles wrote of the incident in his father's biography as drunken advances to several porters at about 4 a.m. that were rejected and then reported to government and railway officials.

== Personal life ==
External videos
- Presentation by Benjamin Welles on Sumner Welles: FDR's Global Strategist – A Biography, January 26, 1998, C-SPAN

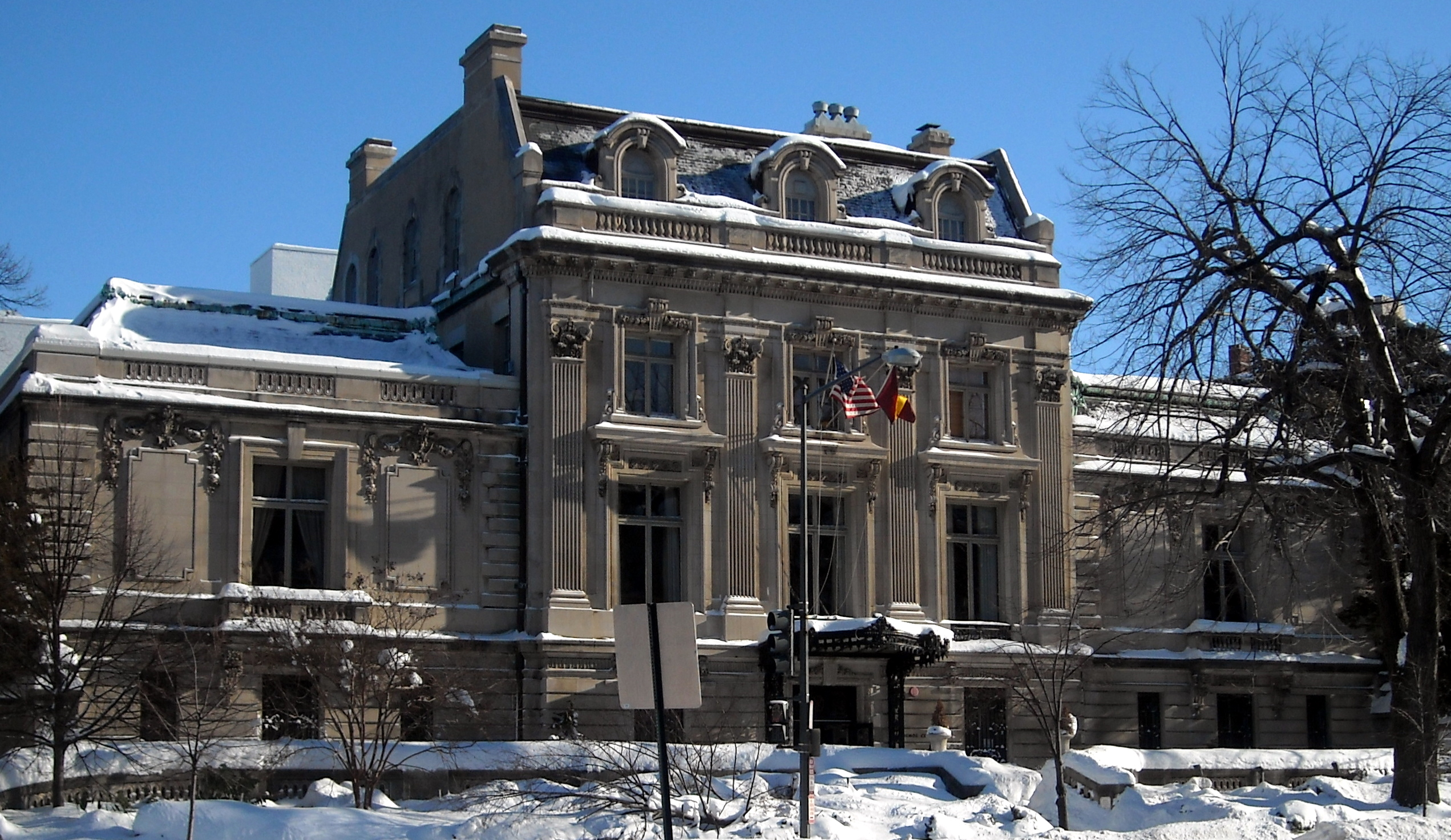
Welles home, the Townsend Mansion, taken in 2010

On April 14, 1915, Sumner Welles married Esther "Hope" Slater of Boston, the sister of a Harvard roommate, in Webster, Massachusetts. She came from a similarly prominent family that owned a textile empire based in Massachusetts. She was descended from industrialist Samuel Slater and granddaughter of the Boston painter William Morris Hunt. Welles and his wife had two sons: Benjamin Welles (1916–2002), a foreign correspondent for The New York Times, later his father's biographer, and Arnold Welles (1918–2002)

In 1923, Slater obtained a divorce from Welles in Paris "on grounds of abandonment and refusal to live with his wife".

Welles occasionally gained public notice for his art dealings. In 1925, for example, he sold a collection of Japanese screens that had been on exhibit at the Metropolitan Museum of Art for several years.

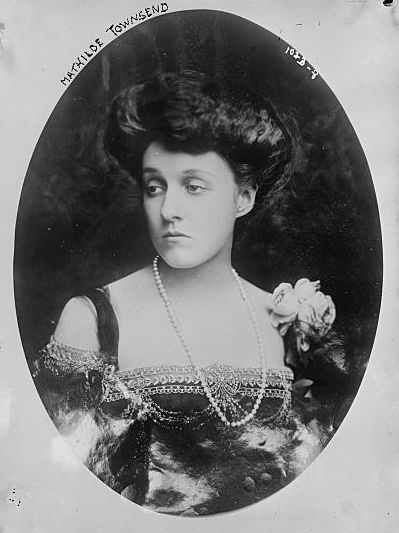
Mathilde Townsend, second wife of Sumner Welles

On June 27, 1925, Welles married Mathilde Scott Townsend (1885–1949), "a noted international beauty" whose portrait had been painted by John Singer Sargent, in upstate New York. Until World War II, the Welleses lived on Massachusetts Avenue in Washington, D.C., in the landmark Townsend Mansion, which later became the home of the Cosmos Club. Mathilde died of peritonitis in 1949 while vacationing in Switzerland with Welles.

Welles spent the bulk of his time a few miles outside of Washington in the Maryland countryside at a 49-room "country cottage" known as Oxon Hill Manor designed for him by Jules Henri de Sibour and built on a 245-acre property in 1929. He entertained foreign dignitaries and diplomats there and hosted informal meetings of senior officials. FDR used the site as an occasional escape from the city as well.

On January 8, 1952, Welles married Harriette Appleton Post, a childhood friend (and a granddaughter of architect George B. Post, designer of the New York Stock Exchange) who had previously married and divorced twice, and had resumed the use of her maiden name, in New York City at the bride's home on Fifth Avenue.

He died on September 24, 1961, at age 68 in Bernardsville, New Jersey. He is buried in Rock Creek Cemetery in Washington, D.C.

=== Legacy ===
The biography written by his son Benjamin Welles concludes:

Sumner Welles made four major contributions to the Roosevelt era. He conceived and carried out the Good Neighbor policy, arguably the all-time, high-water mark in U.S.–Latin American relations. With Roosevelt, Churchill and Alexander Cadogan, he wrote the Atlantic Charter, the cornerstone of the United Nations. In mid–World War II, at FDR's direction, he drafted the original UN Charter. And during and after the war, he threw his support behind a national homeland for the Jews: Israel. The Good Neighbor policy and the Atlantic Charter are largely memories. The United Nations and Israel endure.

Winston Churchill, who made the phrase "No comment" famous, cited Welles as his source for the cryptic response.

Welles's papers are held by the National Archives at the Franklin D. Roosevelt Library in Hyde Park, New York.

The street adjacent to the current Embassy of the United States in Riga, Latvia, was named after Sumner Welles (as Samnera Velsa iela) in 2012.

== Works ==
- The Time for Decision (Harper & Brothers, 1944)
- An Intelligent American's Guide to the Peace (Dryden, 1945), OCLC 458932390
- Where Are We Heading (New York: Harper & Brothers, 1946)
- We Need Not Fail (Boston: Houghton Mifflin Co., 1948)
- Seven Major Decisions That Shaped History (New York: Harper 1951), OCLC 562152843
- Naboth's Vineyard: The Dominican Republic, 1844–1924 (reprint: Arno Press, 1972), ISBN 0-405-04596-4

Diplomatic posts
Preceded by Harry F. Guggenheim	United States Ambassador to Cuba; 1933	Succeeded by Jefferson Caffery
Political offices
Preceded by William Phillips	United States Under Secretary of State; 1936–1943	Succeeded by Edward Stettinius Jr.
