= Stasys =

Stasys is a popular Lithuanian given name, derived from Slavic name Stanislav. Feminine variation is Stasė.

- Stasys Antanas Bačkis (1906–1999), Lithuanian diplomat
- Stasys Baranauskas (1962–2026), Lithuanian footballer
- Stasys Barzdukas (1906–1981) Lithuanian pedagogue, a figure in the Lithuanian community in the United States, a Lithuanianist
- Stasys Eidrigevičius (born 1949), graphic artist
- Stasys Girėnas (1893–1933), Lithuanian-American pilot
- Stasys Jakeliūnas (born 1958), Lithuanian politician
- Stasys Janušauskas (1902–1996), Lithuanian footballer
- Stasys Kropas (born 1953), Lithuanian politician and banker
- Stasys Lozoraitis (1898–1983), Lithuanian diplomat
- Stasys Lozoraitis Jr. (1924–1994), Lithuanian diplomat
- Stasys Malkevičius (born 1928), Lithuanian politician
- Stasys Matulaitis (1866–1956), Lithuanian activist and politician
- Stasys Nastopka (1881–1938), Lithuanian military leader
- Stasys Petronaitis (1932–2016), Lithuanian actor
- Stasys Povilaitis (1947–2015), Lithuanian singer
- Stasys Pundzevičius (1893–1980), Lithuanian general and lecturer
- Stasys Raštikis (1896–1985), Lithuanian general
- Stasys Razma (1899–1941), Lithuanian footballer
- Stasys Šačkus (1907–1985), Lithuanian athlete and basketball player
- Stasys Sabaliauskas (1905–1927), Lithuanian footballer
- Stasys Sakalauskas (1946–2004), Lithuanian diplomat
- Stasys Šalkauskis (1886–1941), Lithuanian philosopher, educator and rector
- Stasys Šaparnis (born 1939), Lithuanian modern pentathlete
- Stasys Šilingas (1885–1962), Lithuanian lawyer and statesman
- Stasys Šimkus (1887–1943), Lithuanian composer
- Stasys Stonkus (1931–2012), Lithuanian basketball player
- Stasys Ušinskas (1905–1974), Lithuanian artist
