= Embassy of Lithuania, Washington, D.C. =

Diplomatic mission of Lithuania to USA

Embassy of Lithuania in Washington, D.C.
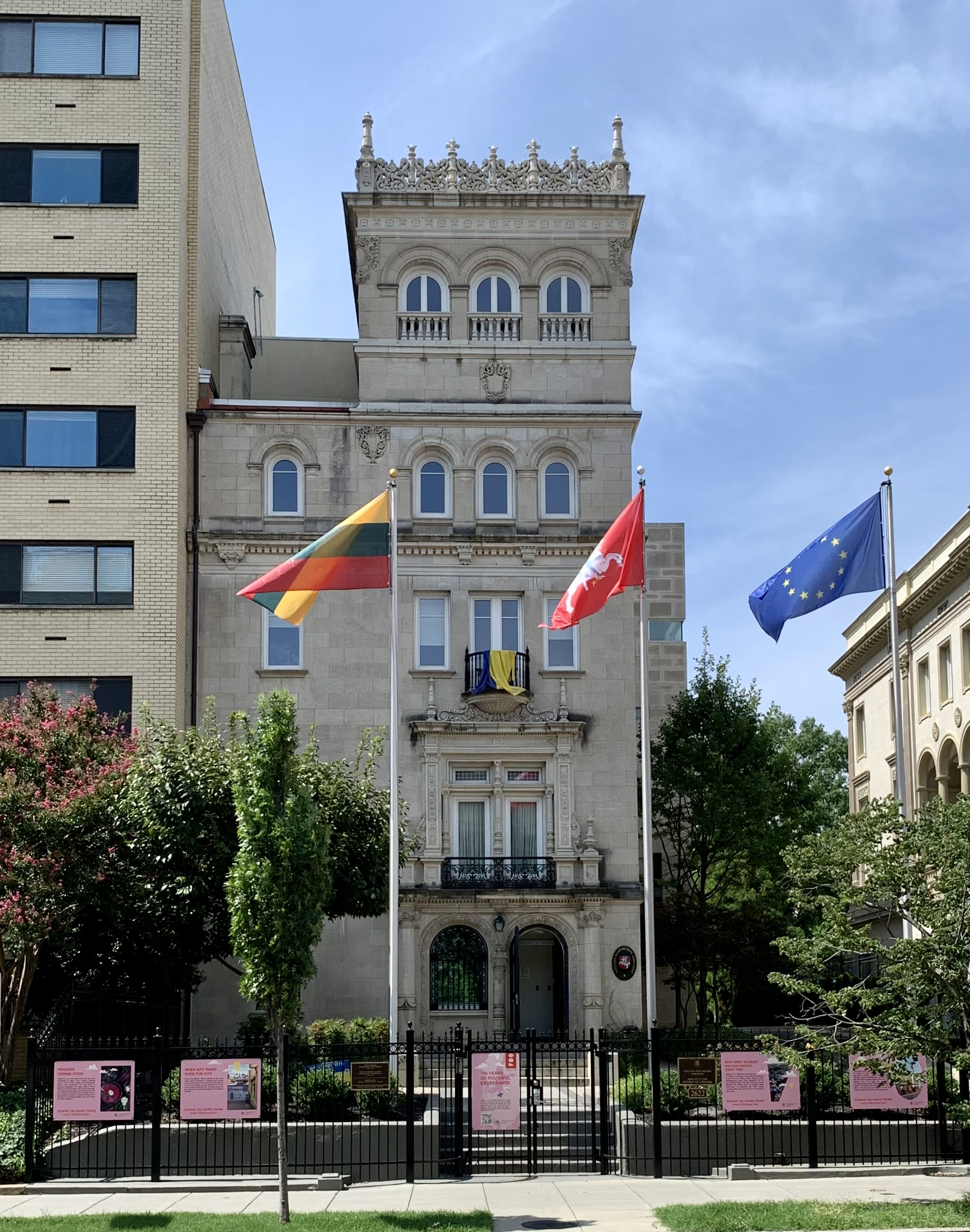
- Embassy of Lithuania in 2023
- Location: Washington, DC, United States
- Address: 2622 16th Street NW, Washington, DC.
- Coordinates: 38°55′26″N 77°02′14″W
- Ambassador: Audra Plepytė

The Embassy of the Republic of Lithuania in Washington, D.C. (Lithuanian: Lietuvos Respublikos ambasada Vašingtone), is the diplomatic mission of the Republic of Lithuania to the United States. It is located at 2622 16th Street Northwest, Washington, D.C., in the Meridian Hill neighborhood.

== Building ==
The building was designed by architect George Oakley Totten Jr. It was built in 1909 by Senator John B. Henderson and his wife Mary Foote Henderson. In 1924, Kazys Bizauskas, the envoy of the Republic of Lithuania to the United States, purchased a building with a substantial plot of land on 16th Street for 90,000 dollars. In the 1950s, the southern wing of the building was demolished, and the narrow northern wing of the villa is still occupied by the Lithuanian Embassy today. It was damaged when a bomb was detonated at the next-door Cuban Interests Section on May 19, 1979. At the time the building was occupied by the Lithuanian diplomatic service acting in conditions of exile. Its meager budget did not allow for extensive repairs. Therefore, Stasys Antanas Bačkis organized a fundraising campaign among Lithuanian Americans and collected about $130,000. The repairs and much needed reconstruction was carried out in 1981–1983. Between 2004 and 2007, the building was extended by a new western wing in the courtyard, and a capsule containing a letter from the President of the Republic of Lithuania, Valdas Adamkus, to future generations was embedded in the wall. The Embassy's renovation was designed by New York architect Saulius Gečas.

== History ==
After World War I, Lithuania regained independence from the Russian Empire and opened legations to establish independent diplomatic representation. At the time, the legation was the standard form of diplomatic mission, and only Great Powers established embassies in each other's capitals. Although Lithuania was occupied and incorporated into the Soviet Union in 1940, its prewar government had instructed its diplomats to maintain an independent presence in exile. After the war, the embassy became the standard form of diplomatic representation, but Lithuania could not receive a U.S. Ambassador since its territory was occupied by the Soviet Union. By 1990, the Baltic legations were the last remaining legations in Washington, D.C. In 1991, an independent Lithuania finally upgraded its legation to an embassy.

== Ambassadors ==
The ambassador of Lithuania in Washington, D.C. is the representative of the Lithuanian government for the US government.

Diplomatic agrément	Diplomatic accreditation	Ambassador	Observations	President of Lithuania	President of the United States	Term end
October 11, 1922			Legation opened.	Aleksandras Stulginskis	Warren G. Harding	
October 11, 1922		Voldemaras Vytautas Čarneckis	Chargé d'affaires	Aleksandras Stulginskis	Warren G. Harding	
December 11, 1923		Kazys Bizauskas	Chargé d'affaires	Aleksandras Stulginskis	Calvin Coolidge	
August 6, 1924		Kazys Bizauskas		Aleksandras Stulginskis	Calvin Coolidge	
November 2, 1928		Bronius Kazys Balutis		Antanas Smetona	Calvin Coolidge	
August 21, 1935		Povilas Žadeikis		Antanas Smetona	Franklin D. Roosevelt	
May 11, 1957		Juozas Kajeckas	Chargé d'affaires	–	Dwight D. Eisenhower	
January 1, 1977		Stasys Antanas Bačkis	Chargé d'affaires	–	Jimmy Carter	
November 15, 1987		Stasys Lozoraitis Jr.	Chargé d'affaires	–	Ronald Reagan	
September 2, 1991			President Bush announced that the US was prepared to immediately establish diplomatic relations with the Republic of Lithuania	Vytautas Landsbergis	George H. W. Bush	
November 5, 1991			Dept informed that the Government of Lithuania wished to raise Legation to Embassy Dept agreed Nov 19	Vytautas Landsbergis	George H. W. Bush	
December 20, 1991	March 11, 1992	Stasys Lozoraitis Jr.		Vytautas Landsbergis	George H. W. Bush	
November 24, 1993	December 9, 1993	Alfonsas Eidintas		Algirdas Brazauskas	Bill Clinton	
September 30, 1997	November 12, 1997	Stasys Sakalauskas		Algirdas Brazauskas	Bill Clinton	
March 7, 2001	March 13, 2001	Vygaudas Ušackas		Valdas Adamkus	George W. Bush	
February 26, 2007	February 27, 2007	Audrius Brūzga		Valdas Adamkus	George W. Bush	
August 5, 2010	August 10, 2010	Žygimantas Pavilionis		Dalia Grybauskaitė	Barack Obama	
August 6, 2015	September 17, 2015	Rolandas Kriščiūnas		Dalia Grybauskaitė	Barack Obama	July 22, 2019
April 21, 2021	May 18, 2021	Audra Plepytė		Gitanas Nausėda	Joe Biden	
July 24, 2025	September 5, 2025	Gediminas Varvuolis		Gitanas Nausėda	Donald Trump	

== See also ==
- Lithuania – United States relations
