= Lozoraitis =

Lozoraitis is the masculine form of a Lithuanian surname. Originated from a name Lazar. Its feminine forms are: Lozoraitienė (married woman or widow) and Lozoraitytė (unmarried woman).

The surname may refer to:

- Stasys Lozoraitis (1898–1983), Foreign Minister of Lithuania from 1934 until 1938, head of Lithuania's government in exile.
- Stasys Lozoraitis Jr. (1924–1994), Lithuanian ambassador to the U.S. between 1991 and 1993
- Kazys Lozoraitis (1929–2007), the first ambassador of Lithuania to the Holy See and to the Sovereign Military Order of Malta
