= Lithuania–United States relations =

- Lithuania: United States

Diplomatic mission
- Embassy of Lithuania, Washington, D.C.: Embassy of the United States, Vilnius

Lithuania–United States relations are the bilateral foreign relations between Lithuania and the United States. Lithuania is one of the most pro-United States nations in the world, with 73% of Lithuanians viewing the U.S. positively in 2011. According to the 2012 U.S. Global Leadership Report, 48% of Lithuanians approve of U.S. leadership, with 20% disapproving and 32% uncertain.

== History ==
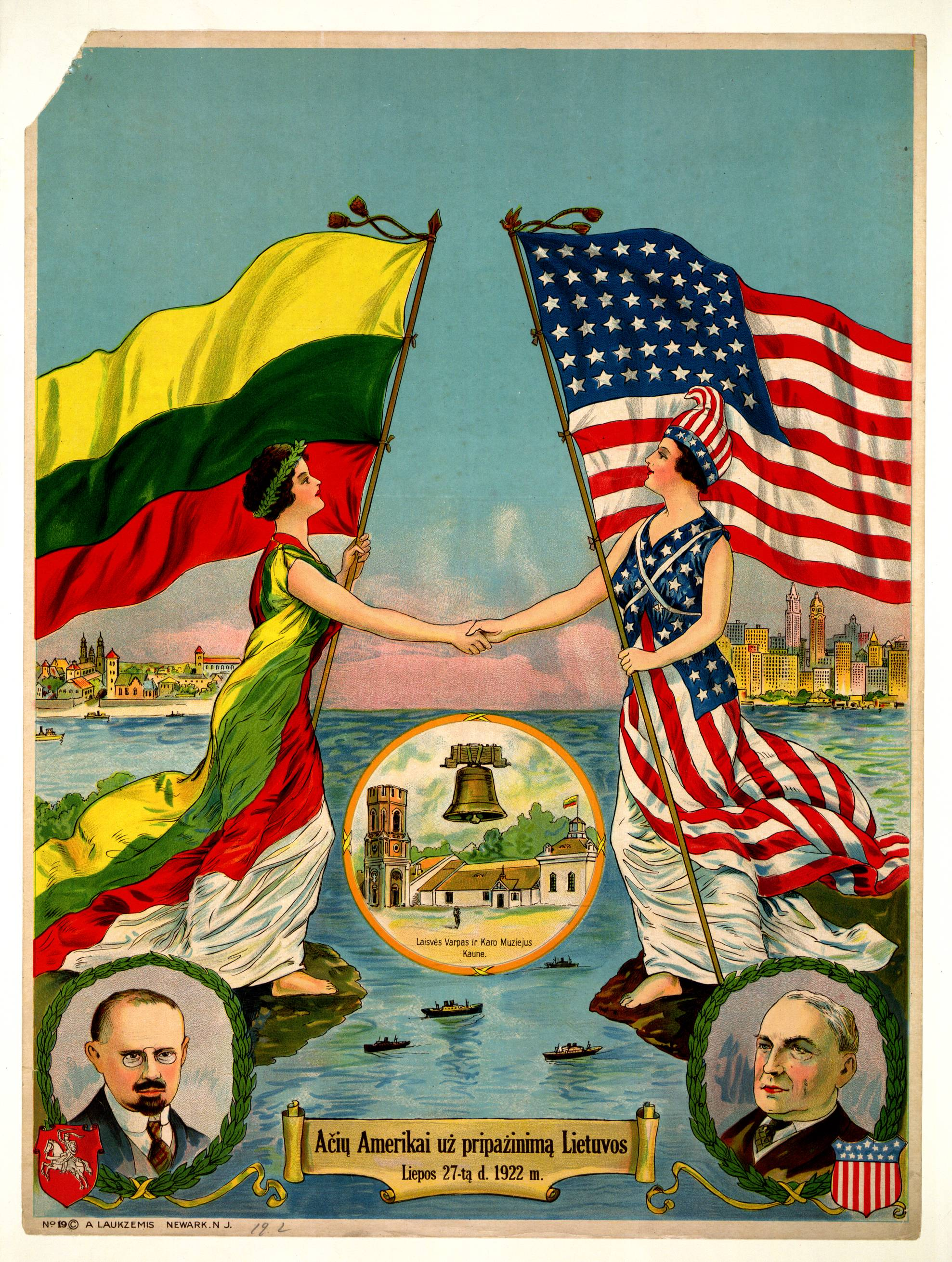
A Lithuanian poster from 1922 celebrating the recognition of Lithuania by the United States.

The United States established diplomatic relations with Lithuania on 28 July 1922. During World War II, Lithuania was at various times occupied by the Soviet Union and Nazi Germany. The Soviet invasion and occupation forced the closure of the Legation to Lithuania on 5 September 1940. However, Lithuanian Diplomatic Service in the United States continued uninterrupted. American prisoners of war were among Allied POWs held by the Germans in the Stalag Luft VI POW camp in German-occupied Lithuania. The United States never recognized the forced incorporation of Lithuania into the USSR and views the present government of Lithuania as a legal continuation of the interwar republic. Following the Dissolution of the USSR, Lithuania and the United States re-established diplomatic relations on 6 September 1991. In 2007, the United States and Lithuania celebrated 85 years of continuous diplomatic relations. Lithuania has enjoyed most-favored-nation treatment with the United States since December 1991. Since 1992, the United States has committed more than $100 million in Lithuania to economic and political transformation and to humanitarian needs. The United States and Lithuania signed an agreement on bilateral trade and intellectual property protection in 1994 and a bilateral investment treaty in 1997. In 1998, the United States signed a "Charter of Partnership" with Lithuania and the other Baltic countries establishing bilateral working groups focusing on improving regional security, defense, and economic issues.

Today, over 650,000 individuals who identify as Lithuanian American live in the United States. Lithuanian immigration began before the United States even became a country, with individuals like Alexander Curtius settling in New Amsterdam (what would later become New York City) in 1659. Lithuania was part of the Polish–Lithuanian Commonwealth until 1795, when foreign powers partitioned it and Lithuania was largely incorporated into the Russian Empire. Despite attempts by the Tsarist government in Moscow to prevent residents of the empire from emigrating, many Lithuanians came to the United States throughout the 19th and early 20th Centuries, settling primarily in the Northeast (especially Pennsylvania) and the Midwest. Lithuanian immigration tapered off with the passage of nativist legislation like the Emergency Quota Act of 1921 and the Immigration Act of 1924 in Congress. Smaller waves of Lithuanian migration to the United States occurred at the end of World War II (thanks to the Displaced Persons Act) and when Lithuania regained its independence in 1990.

In November 2002, George W. Bush became the first US president to visit Lithuania. It was a visit following the NATO invitation to join the alliance.

Anyone who would choose Lithuania as an enemy has also made an enemy of the United States of America.

— George W. Bush, November 2002 in Vilnius

In July 2023, Lithuania hosted 2023 Vilnius summit, receiving the US President Joe Biden along with around 40 other leaders. During the visit, President Biden gave a speech in Vilnius University.

== Ambassadors ==
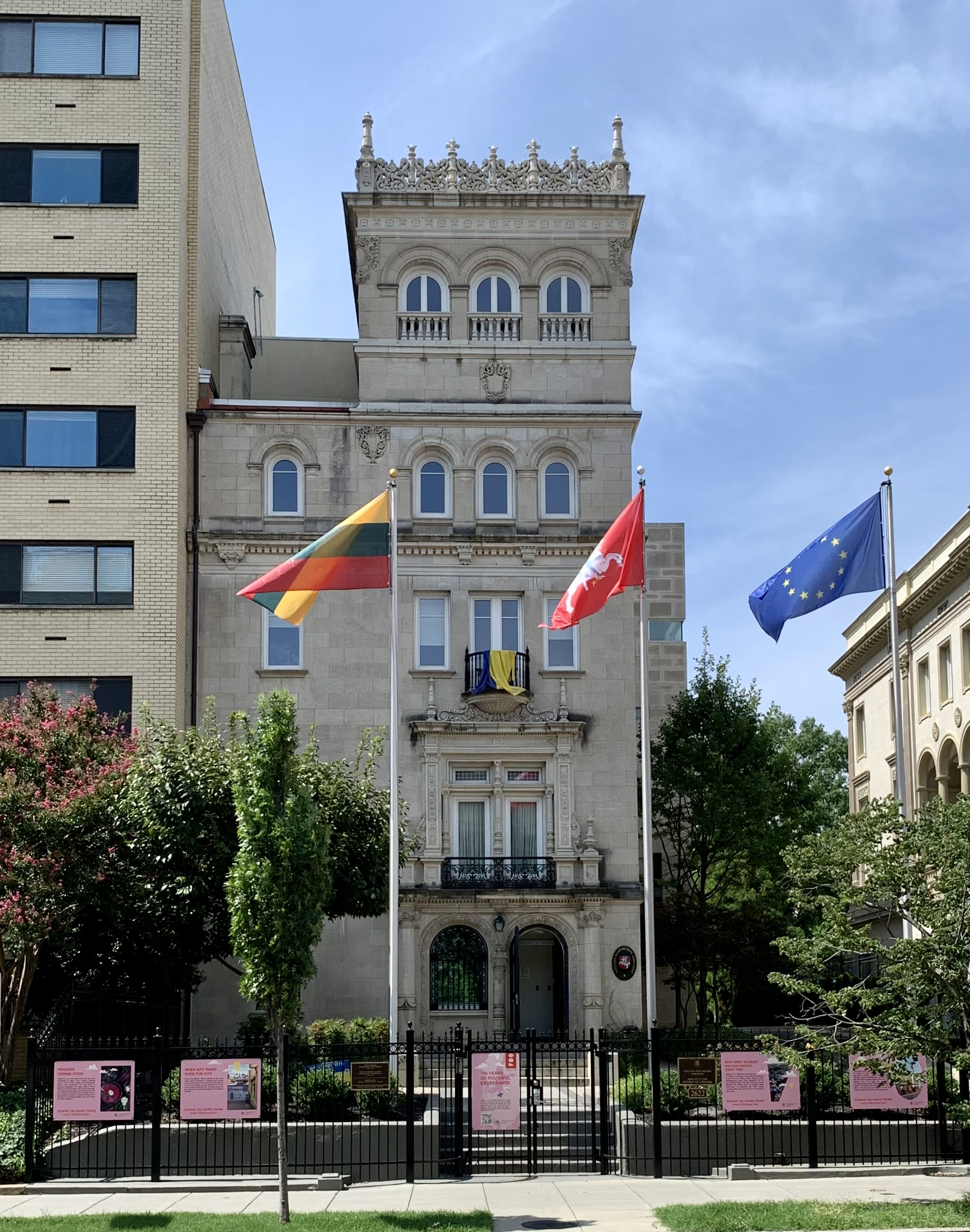
Embassy of Lithuania on 16th Street NW in Washington, D.C., circa 2023

Principal U.S. officials include

- Ambassador — Kara McDonald
- Deputy Chief of Mission — Tamir Waser

The U.S. Embassy in Lithuania is located in Vilnius (Akmenų g. 6).

Principal Lithuanian officials include:

- Ambassador - Rolandas Kriščiūnas
- Executive Assistant to the Ambassador - Eglė Janeliūnaitė
- Deputy Chief of Mission - Tomas Gulbinas

== Gallery ==
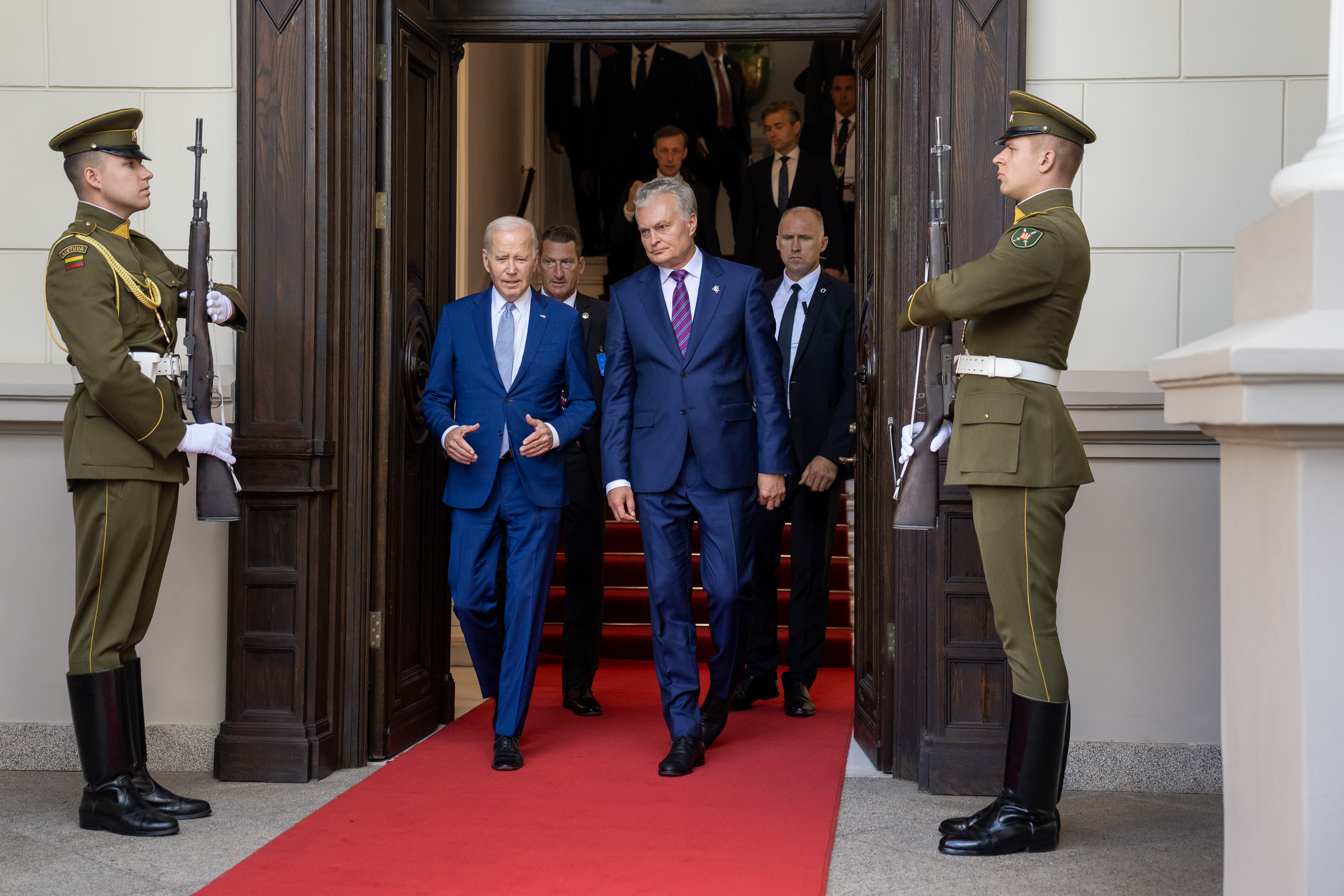
President Gitanas Nausėda and President Joe Biden during the 2023 Vilnius summit

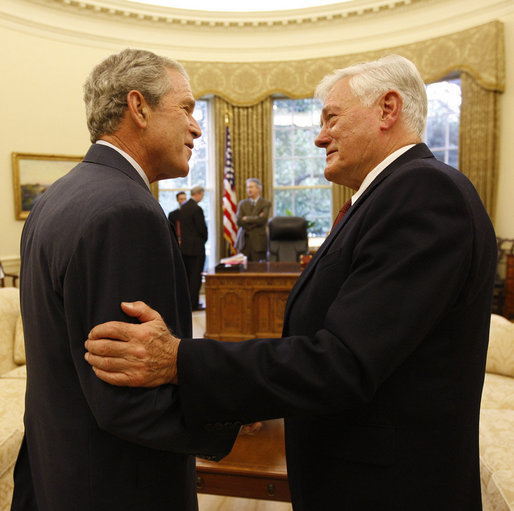
President George W. Bush and President Valdas Adamkus

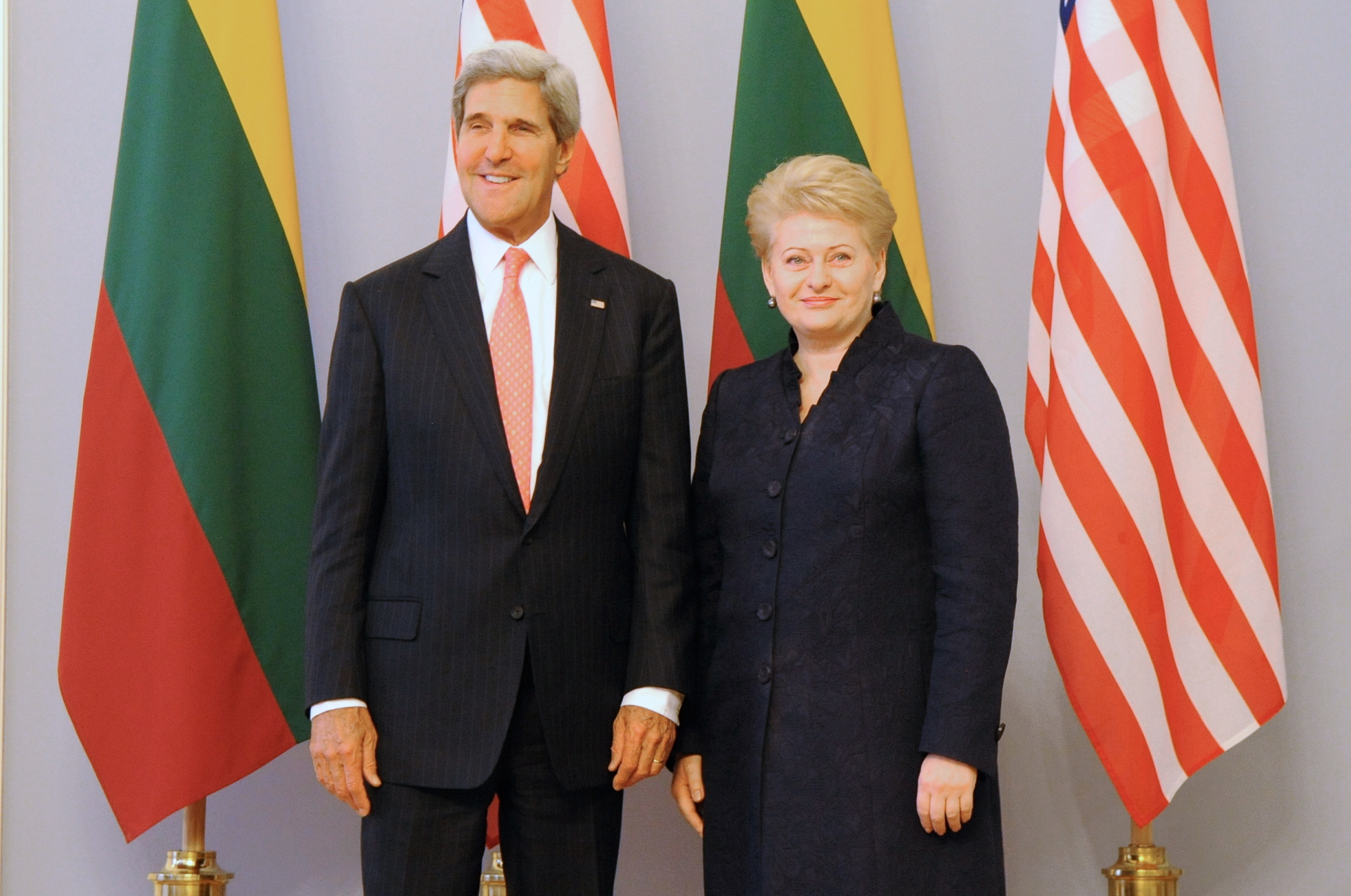
US Secretary of State John Kerry meets with Lithuanian President Dalia Grybauskaitė

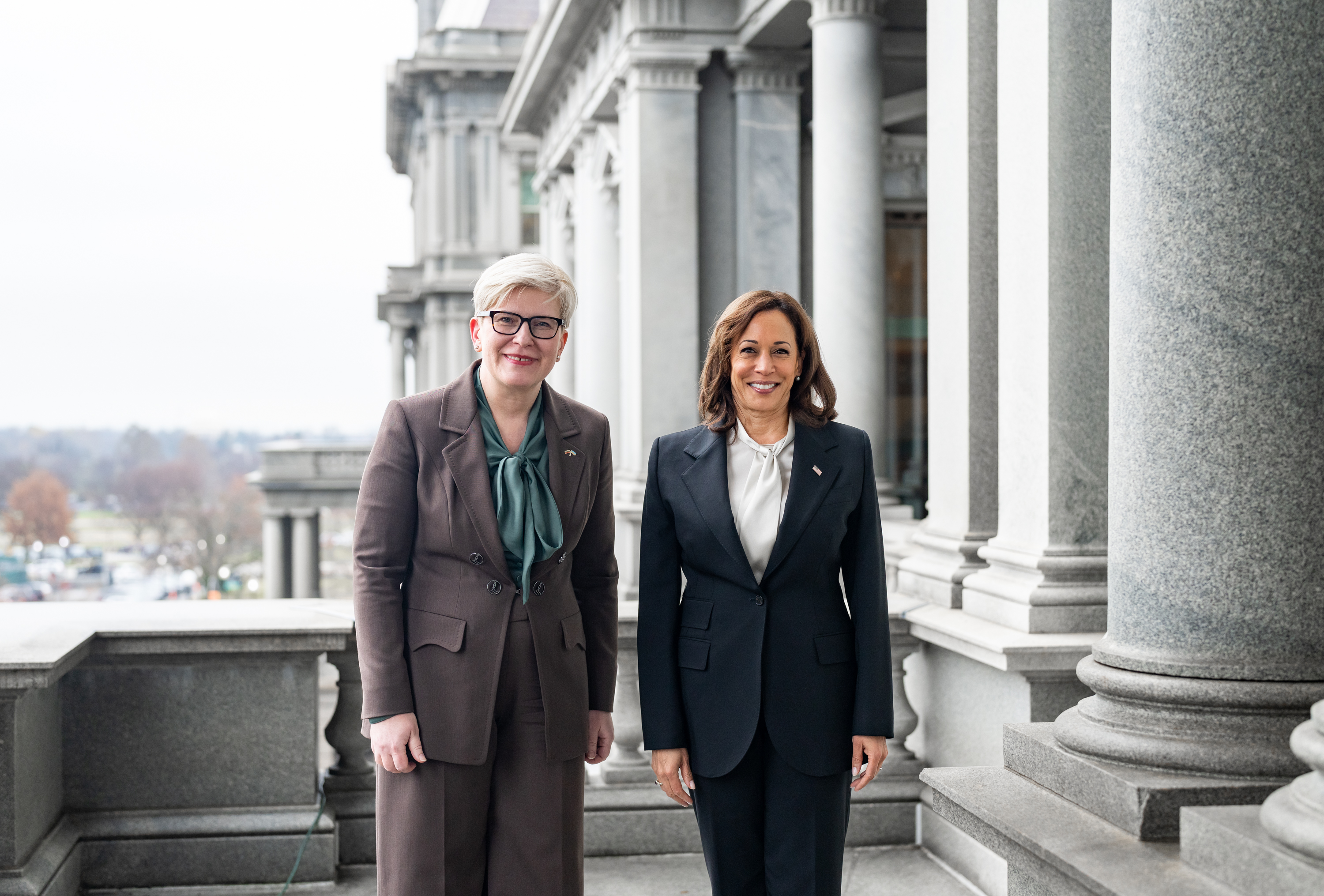
Vice President Kamala Harris met with Prime Minister Ingrida Šimonytė to celebrate 100 years of diplomatic relations between US and Lithuania

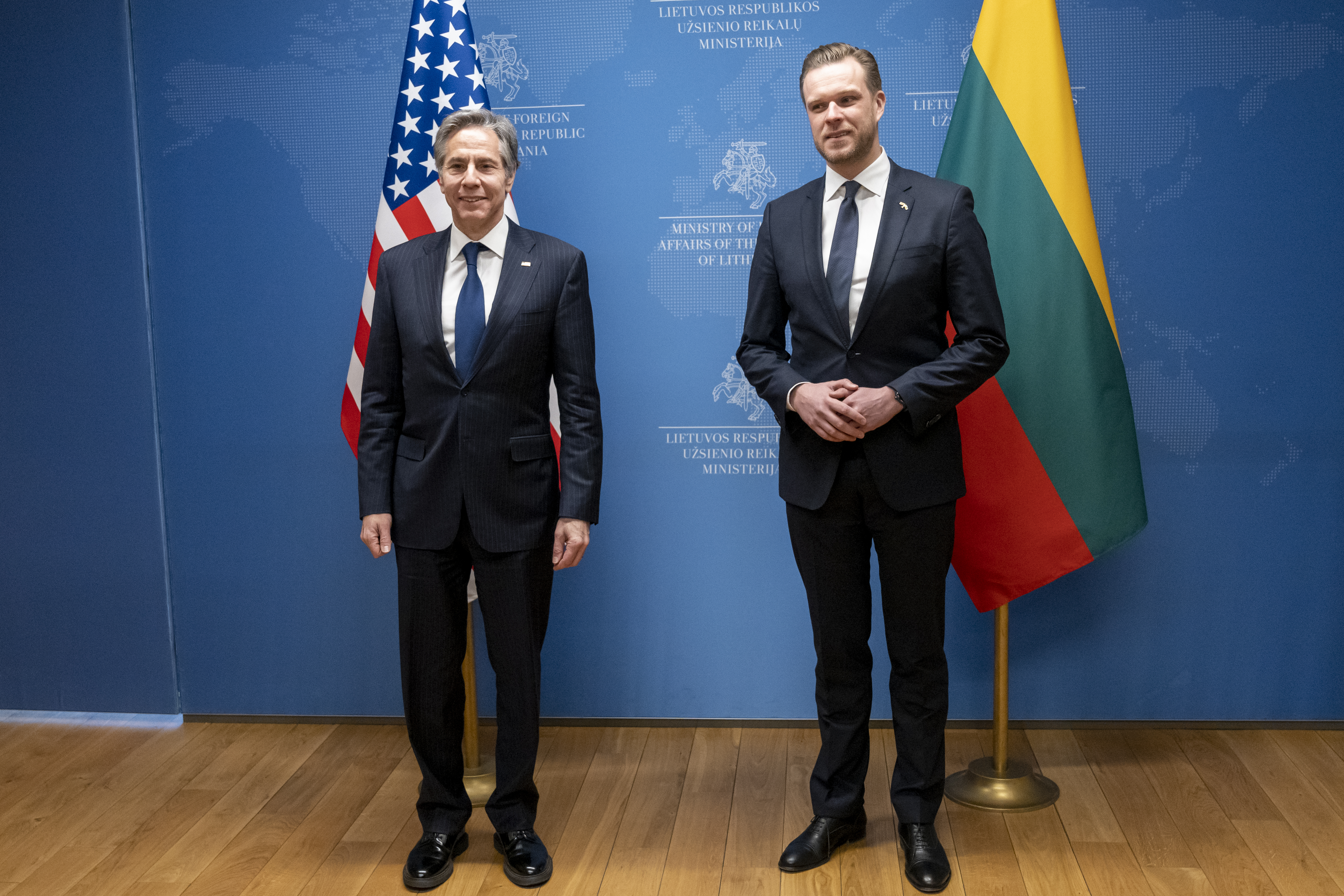
US Secretary of State Antony J. Blinken meets with Lithuanian Foreign Minister Gabrielius Landsbergis

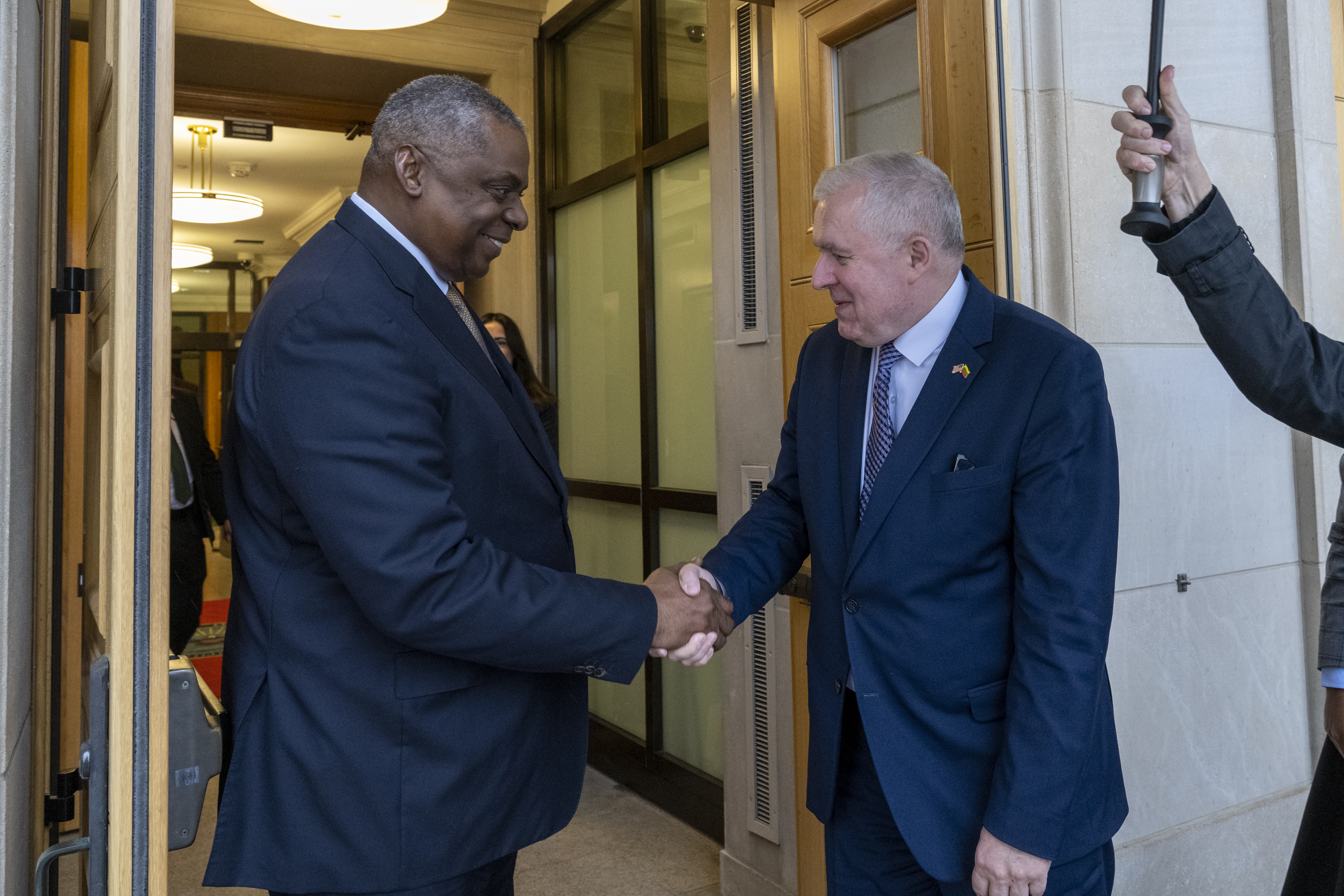
Secretary of Defense Lloyd J. Austin III hosts Lithuanian Defense Minister Arvydas Anušauskas

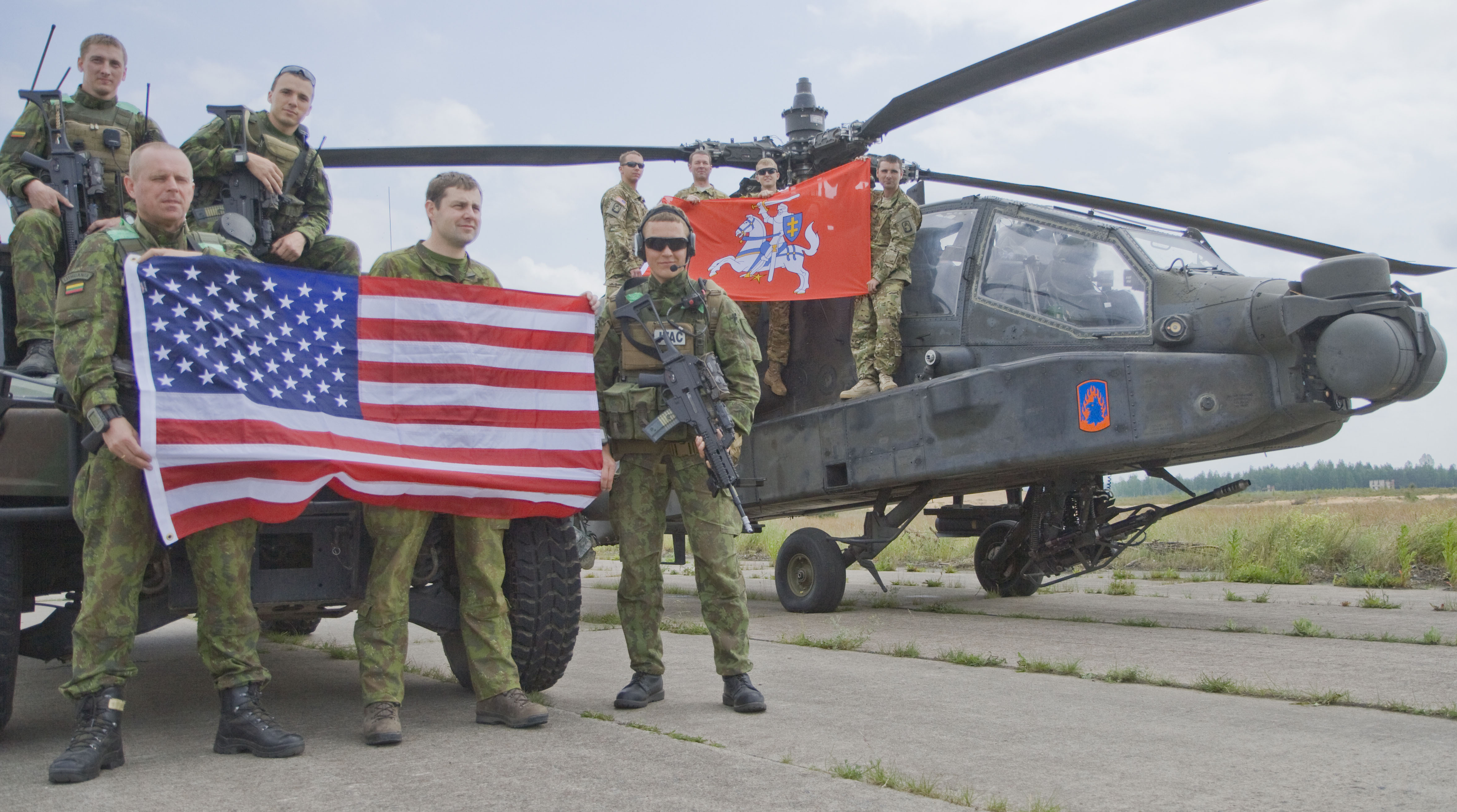
Lithuanian Armed Forces training together with the US Armed Forces

== See also ==
- Lithuanian Americans
- Foreign relations of the United States
- Foreign relations of Lithuania
