= Bačkis =

- Lithuanian surname
- m.: Bačkis
- f.: (unmarried): Bačkytė
- f.: (married): Bačkienė

Bačkis is a Lithuanian language family name. It may refer to:

- Audrys Bačkis (born 1937), Lithuanian prelate of the Catholic Church and a cardinal
- Stasys Antanas Bačkis, Lithuanian diplomat, publicist
