= 1993 Lithuanian presidential election =

- 14 February 1993
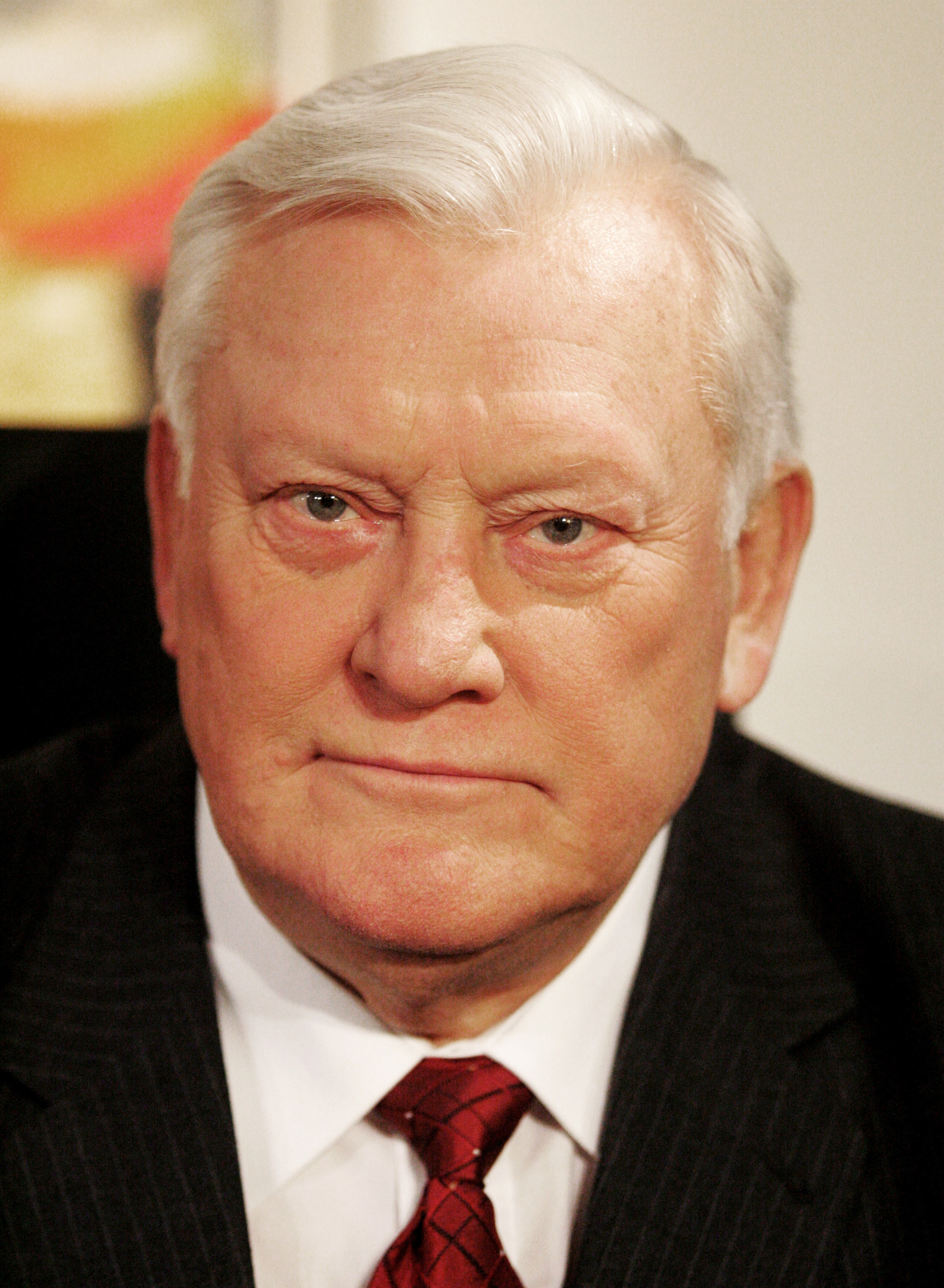
| Nominee | Algirdas Brazauskas | Stasys Lozoraitis Jr. |
| Party | LDDP | Independent |
| Popular vote | 1,212,075 | 772,922 |
| Percentage | 61.06% | 38.94% |
President before election
Algirdas Brazauskas (acting)
LDDP
Elected President
Algirdas Brazauskas
LDDP

Presidential elections were held in Lithuania on 14 February 1993. They were the first presidential elections under the new October 1992 constitution and the first direct presidential elections in the country's history.

Acting president Algirdas Brazauskas, the former first secretary of the Communist Party of Lithuania and leader of the Democratic Labour Party of Lithuania (LDDP), won over 60% of the vote, enough to win without a runoff. The runner up was Stasys Lozoraitis Jr., an independent candidate endorsed by the Sąjūdis movement and other political parties. These presidential elections had fewest number of candidates up to date.

By-elections to several municipal councils were held on the same day.

== Campaign ==
Under Brazauskas' leadership, the LDDP had won 73 out of 141 seats in the Seimas in the 1992 parliamentary elections. Brazauskas was subsequently appointed as Speaker, and by virtue of that position, also became acting president. Based on the success of the LDDP in the parliamentary elections, Brazauskas was considered favorite for the presidential elections.

The Social Democratic Party of Lithuania proposed poet Justinas Marcinkevičius as a unity candidate against Brazauskas, but Marcinkevičius refused, stating that he was not a politician. Vytautas Landsbergis, leader of the pro-independence Sąjūdis movement, withdrew his candidacy in support of Stasys Lozoraitis Jr., a Lithuanian diplomat, who had spent almost all of his life in Italy and the United States representing the interwar independent Lithuania. Because of the Iron Curtain, his work was virtually unknown in Lithuania. No other candidates came forward as other parties with the exception of the Polish minority declared their support for Lozoraitis as they had become alarmed by the dominance of Brazauskas and the LDDP.

The campaign was limited to three weeks. Lozoraitis stressed his experience in complex foreign affairs. Brazauskas, operating in a familiar environment, was better prepared to address domestic affairs and promised to focus on a smooth transition from planned economy to free market. During the campaign, opponents depicted Lozoraitis as a foreigner who did not understand the current situation of Lithuania and was largely dependent on the unpopular Sąjūdis. Valdas Adamkus, who went on to win the 1997–98 presidential elections, assisted Lozoraitis in his campaign.

== Opinion polls ==
| Pollster | Fieldwork date | Sample size | | | |
| Pollster | Fieldwork date | Sample size | Brazauskas LDDP | Lozoraitis Jr. Ind. | Others Undecided |
|---|---|---|---|---|---|
| FSTI | 19–20 January 1993 | − | 57% | 29% | 14% |
| LTV | 6–14 January 1993 | − | 51% | 26% | 23% |

== Results ==
Brazauskas received a majority of the vote everywhere except Kaunas, and did particularly well in areas inhabited by the Russian and Polish minorities. This allowed him to win the presidency in a single round; his 61 percent vote share exceeded the 50 percent threshold required to avoid a runoff.

| Candidate | Party | Votes | % |
|---|---|---|---|
| Algirdas Brazauskas | Democratic Labour Party of Lithuania | 1,212,075 | 61.06 |
| Stasys Lozoraitis Jr. | Independent | 772,922 | 38.94 |
| Total | | 1,984,997 | 100.00 |
| Valid votes | | 1,984,997 | 98.32 |
| Invalid/blank votes | | 34,018 | 1.68 |
| Total votes | | 2,019,015 | 100.00 |
| Registered voters/turnout | | 2,568,016 | 78.62 |
Source: Nohlen & Stöver

== Aftermath ==
The inauguration ceremony took place on 25 February. In May 1993, just a few months after the elections, Brazauskas recalled Lozoraitis as ambassador to the United States despite criticism of politicizing the issue.
