= Povilas Žadeikis =

Lithuanian diplomat (1887–1957)

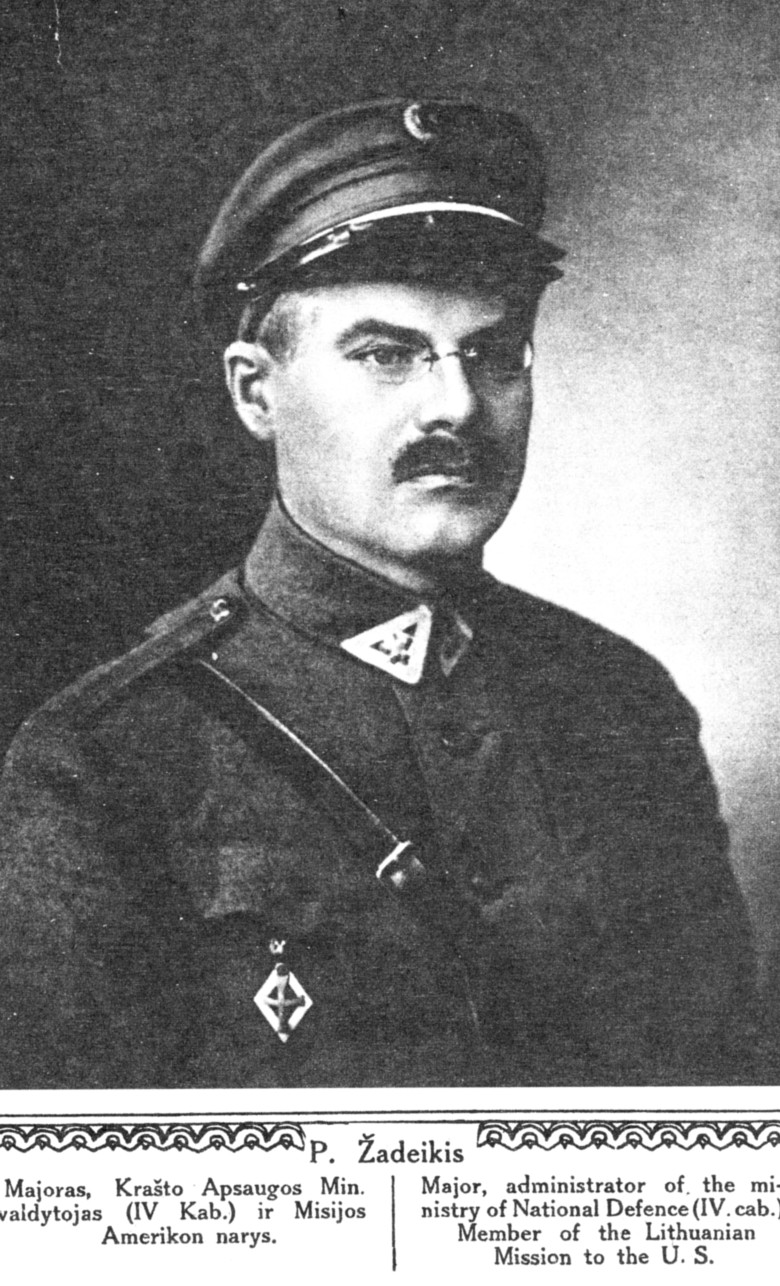
- Paknys in Lietuvos albumas

Minister of Defence
- In office 18 August 1919 – 9 October 1919
- Prime Minister: Mykolas Sleževičius
- Preceded by: Antanas Merkys
- Succeeded by: Pranas Liatukas

Personal details
- Born: 14 March 1887 Parešketis, Russian Empire
- Died: 11 May 1957 (aged 70) Washington, D.C., United States
- Education: Saint Petersburg University
- Occupation: Diplomat
- Awards: Order of Vytautas the Great (1930)

Povilas Žadeikis (14 March 1887 – 11 May 1957) was a representative of Lithuania in the United States from 1934 until his death in 1957. He was replaced by Juozas Kajeckas, who in turn was replaced by Stasys Bačkis in 1976.

== Career ==
During World War I, Žadeikis served in the Russian army. From July to October 1919 he served as Minister of Defense in a cabinet formed by Mykolas Sleževičius. In 1920–1923 he served in military missions in the United States and France. In December 1923 he joined the Ministry of Foreign Affairs and was sent to consular services in the United States. He served as the first consul in Chicago (1924–1928), consul general in New York City (1928–1934), and envoy extraordinary and minister plenipotentiary in Washington, D.C. (1934–1957). Even when Lithuania lost its independence in 1940 to the Soviet Union, Žadeikis remained in his post as lawful representative of Lithuania. He maintained contacts with other Lithuanian diplomats abroad and worked with Lithuanian organizations, such as Supreme Committee for the Liberation of Lithuania (VLIK) and Lithuanian American Council.
