= Kazys Lozoraitis =

Lithuanian diplomat

Kazys Lozoraitis

Kazys Lozoraitis (23 July 1929 in Berlin – 13 August 2007 in Rome) was a prominent Lithuanian diplomat and cultural activist. He was the first ambassador of Lithuania to the Holy See and to the Sovereign Military Order of Malta.

== Biography ==
Kazys Lozoraitis was born into a family of diplomat and politician Stasys Lozoraitis in Berlin in 1929. In 1933, he moved with his family to Lithuania. Soon afterwards, his father was appointed to a new position in Italy, and the family moved to Rome. In Rome, he finished gymnasium (preparatory school) and then studied journalism at the Sapienza University of Rome. He worked for over ten years at Radio Italia, and began working for Radio Vatican in 1972. In 1960, he was appointed secretary of the chief of the Lithuanian diplomatic service in exile, as Lithuania was then occupied by the Soviet Union. Between 1985 and 1992 he served as Head of the Chancellery of Lithuanian Representation to the Holy See; after 1980 he served as vice-chairman of the Italian Lithuanian Community.

In 1992, Lozoraitis was accredited as the Lithuanian Ambassador to the Holy See; two years later he was named Lithuanian Ambassador Extraordinary and Plenipotentiary to the Order of Malta, becoming the first person to hold these positions after the re-establishment of Lithuania's independence in 1990. He held this post until 2004. Lozoraitis was active in the cultural life of both Lithuania and Italy. In 2007, he donated his family's personal library, consisting of more than 16,000 publications, to the Martynas Mažvydas National Library of Lithuania; he also donated his unique collection of historic photographs and records to the museum at the Historical Presidential Palace in Kaunas.

Lozoraitis died of cancer in Rome on 13 August 2007. He was temporarily interred in Rome, but since one of his last wishes was to be buried in Lithuania, arrangements were made for his reburial in Kaunas. In September 2007, Lozoraitis was reburied in Kaunas' Petrašiūnai Cemetery, near his brother Stasys Lozoraitis Jr. Lithuanian President Valdas Adamkus, as well as other prominent Lithuanian politicians like Vytautas Landsbergis, attended the ceremony.

== Awards ==
Lozoraitis was awarded several decorations:

- Grand Cross of Commander of the Order of the Lithuanian Grand Duke Gediminas
- Grand Cross of the Order for Merits to Lithuania
- Chevalier of the Order of St. Sylvester
