= Stasys Sakalauskas =

Lithuanian diplomat, ambassador

Ambassador of the Republic of Lithuania to the United States of America and Mexico
- In office 22 September 1997 – 4 March 2001
- President: Algirdas Brazauskas; Valdas Adamkus
- Prime Minister: Gediminas Vagnorius; Rolandas Paksas; Andrius Kubilius
- Preceded by: Alfonsas Eidintas
- Succeeded by: Vygaudas Ušackas

Personal details
- Born: 19 August 1946 Kaunas, Lithuania
- Died: 25 March 2004
- Spouse: Jūratė
- Children: Antanas, Vytautas
- Education: Kaunas Polytechnic Institute

Stasys Sakalauskas (19 August 1946 – 25 March 2004) was a Lithuanian diplomat, Ambassador Extraordinary and Plenipotentiary of the Republic of Lithuania.

== Early life and career ==
Stasys Sakalauskas was born on 19 August 1946 in Kaunas, Lithuania. In his hometown, he finished Salomėja Nėris Secondary School and graduated from Kaunas Polytechnic Institute. Afterwards, he was invited to work in the institute. Here he defended his Doctor of Technology Thesis and became an associate professor. As a lecturer, he worked in Kaunas Polytechnic Institute for almost 22 years.

== Diplomatic Service ==
He began his diplomat's career on 1 October 1991 by becoming the Chief Expert of the America, Canada, and Asia Division of the Policy Department of the Ministry of Foreign Affairs of the Republic of Lithuania.

From 1 November 1991 to 14 July 1994, he worked as the Head of the America, Canada, and Asia Division of the Policy Department. After three years, from 15 July 1994 to 2 March 1997, he worked in the Embassy of Lithuania to the US as a political counsellor as well as was the military attaché.

On 3 March 1997, he was appointed as the Secretary of the Ministry of Foreign Affairs of the Republic of Lithuania and in the same year, on 22 September 1997, as the Ambassador Extraordinary and Plenipotentiary of the Republic of Lithuania to the US and Mexico. Letters of appointment were delivered to US President Bill Clinton on 12 November 1997. The mandate ended on 4 March 2001.

From 5 March 2001 to 6 April 2003, Stasys Sakalauskas was Ambassador at Large of the Ministry of Foreign Affairs.

From 7 April 2003 up until his death, he was the Ambassador at Large regarding Kaliningrad issues in the Eastern Europe and Central Asia Department.

In 2003, Stasys Sakalauskas was awarded the Cross of Commander of the Order for Merits to Lithuania.
