= Stasys Lozoraitis =

Lithuanian diplomat and politician

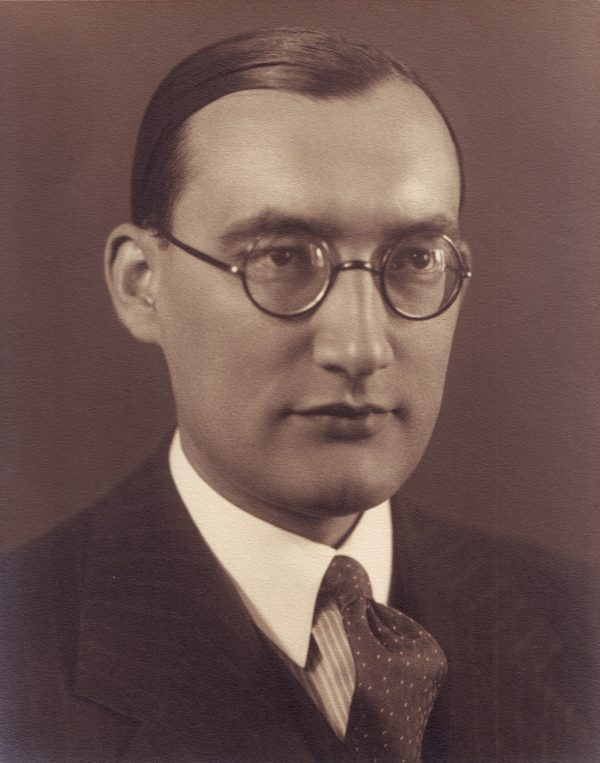

Foreign Minister of Lithuania
- In office 12 June 1934 – 5 December 1938
- President: Antanas Smetona
- Prime Minister: Juozas Tūbelis; Vladas Mironas
- Preceded by: Dovas Zaunius
- Succeeded by: Juozas Urbšys

Head of the Lithuanian Diplomatic Service
- In office 15 June 1940 – 24 December 1983
- Preceded by: position established
- Succeeded by: Stasys Bačkis

Personal details
- Born: 5 September 1898 Kaunas, Russian Empire
- Died: 24 December 1983 (aged 85) Rome, Italy
- Party: Independent
- Children: Stasys Lozoraitis Jr. Kazys Lozoraitis
- Education: University of Berlin
- Occupation: Diplomat

See Stasys Lozoraitis Jr. for an article about a son of Stasys Lozoraitis.

Stasys Lozoraitis (5 September [O.S. 24 August] 1898 – 24 December 1983) was a Lithuanian diplomat and politician who served as the Foreign Minister of Lithuania from 1934 until 1938. After Lithuania lost its independence in June 1940, Lozoraitis headed the Lithuanian diplomatic service from 1940 to his death in 1983. Most western countries did not recognize the Soviet occupation and continued to recognize legations and envoys of independent Lithuania, thus maintaining the legal continuity of Lithuania.

Lozoraitis was a son of Motiejus Lozoraitis, a lawyer, activist of the Lithuanian National Revival, and contributor to Varpas. In 1923, he was assigned to the Lithuanian legation in Berlin. While in Germany, Lozoraitis studied international law at the University of Berlin. In 1929, he was transferred to Rome, where he became chargé d'affaires in 1931. In 1932, he returned to Lithuania and worked at the Ministry of Foreign Affairs, becoming the Minister in June 1934. He worked to establish the Baltic Entente and to normalize relations with Poland, with which there were no diplomatic relations since Żeligowski's Mutiny in 1920. Lozoraitis resigned after Poland presented an ultimatum in 1938 to resume diplomatic relations.

In February 1939, Lozoraitis was appointed as minister plenipotentiary to Italy. After Lithuania was occupied by the Soviet Union in June 1940, Lozoraitis became the leader of all Lithuanian diplomatic service that remained abroad. As the highest de jure official of independent Lithuania, he represented Lithuania, advocated for non-recognition of the Soviet occupation, and popularized the Lithuanian cause. Lozoraitis continued to live in Rome and head the diplomatic service until his death on December 24, 1983. Upon his death, he was succeeded by Stasys Bačkis.
