= Baltic Legations (1940–1991) =

Missions of exiled Baltic diplomatic services from 1940 to 1991

The Baltic Legations were the missions of the exiled Baltic diplomatic services from 1940 to 1991. After the Soviet occupation of the Baltic states in 1940, the Baltic states instructed their diplomats to maintain their countries' legations in several Western capitals. Members of the Estonian diplomatic service, the Latvian diplomatic service and the Lithuanian diplomatic service continued to be recognised as the diplomatic representatives of the independent pre-World War II states of Estonia, Latvia and Lithuania, whose annexation by the Soviet Union was not recognised by the United States, the United Kingdom, or France. The legations provided consular services to exiled citizens of the Baltic states from 1940 to 1991.

== History ==
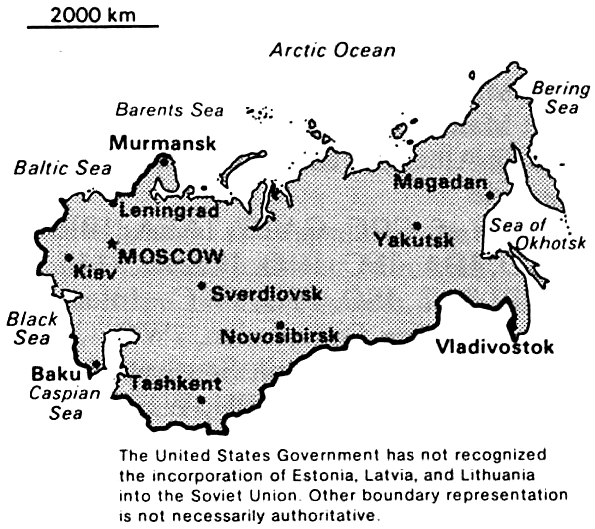
This map from the 1990 CIA World Factbook notes that the United States did not recognise the Soviet occupation of the Baltic states

Between May and June 1940, the Baltic governments reached a secret decision that in the event of an emergency, the powers of government to appoint and recall diplomatic and consular representatives were assigned to the heads of the respective legations in the event that connection with the governments was lost. After the Soviet occupation in 1940, Soviet authorities attempted to have missions turned over and the diplomatic representatives return home. Draconian laws were promulgated in 1940 to induce compliance; the diplomats who refused to return were declared outlaws with the penalty of death by shooting within 24 hours of their capture.

== Legation property ==
All three legations maintained at least one diplomatic property in the United States until the end of the Cold War. Latvia and Lithuania maintained their original legations in Washington, D.C., while Estonia maintained a consulate in New York City. After World War II, the legation died out as a form of diplomatic representation, as countries upgraded them to embassies. However, the Baltic states did not control their own territory and could not receive a U.S. ambassador. By 1990, the three Baltic legations were the only remaining legations on the U.S. State Department's Diplomatic List.

The Estonian legation in London was maintained until 1989, when financial pressure forced its sale. The Latvian and Lithuanian legations continued their work. The Baltic legations in Paris were transferred de facto to the Soviet Embassy. The Estonian legation was demolished in 1979, and the Latvian legation was recorded as a Soviet property in 1967. However, the Lithuanian legation remained registered to the prewar government of Lithuania, and the Soviet Embassy was unable to sell the building.
