= Lithuanian Diplomatic Service =

Lithuanian governmental service

The Diplomatic Service of the Republic of Lithuania (Lithuanian: Lietuvos Respublikos diplomatinė tarnyba) is the part of the governmental service tasked with enforcing the foreign policy set by the President, the Parliament, and the Government of the Republic of Lithuania. The head of the service is the Foreign Minister.

== History ==
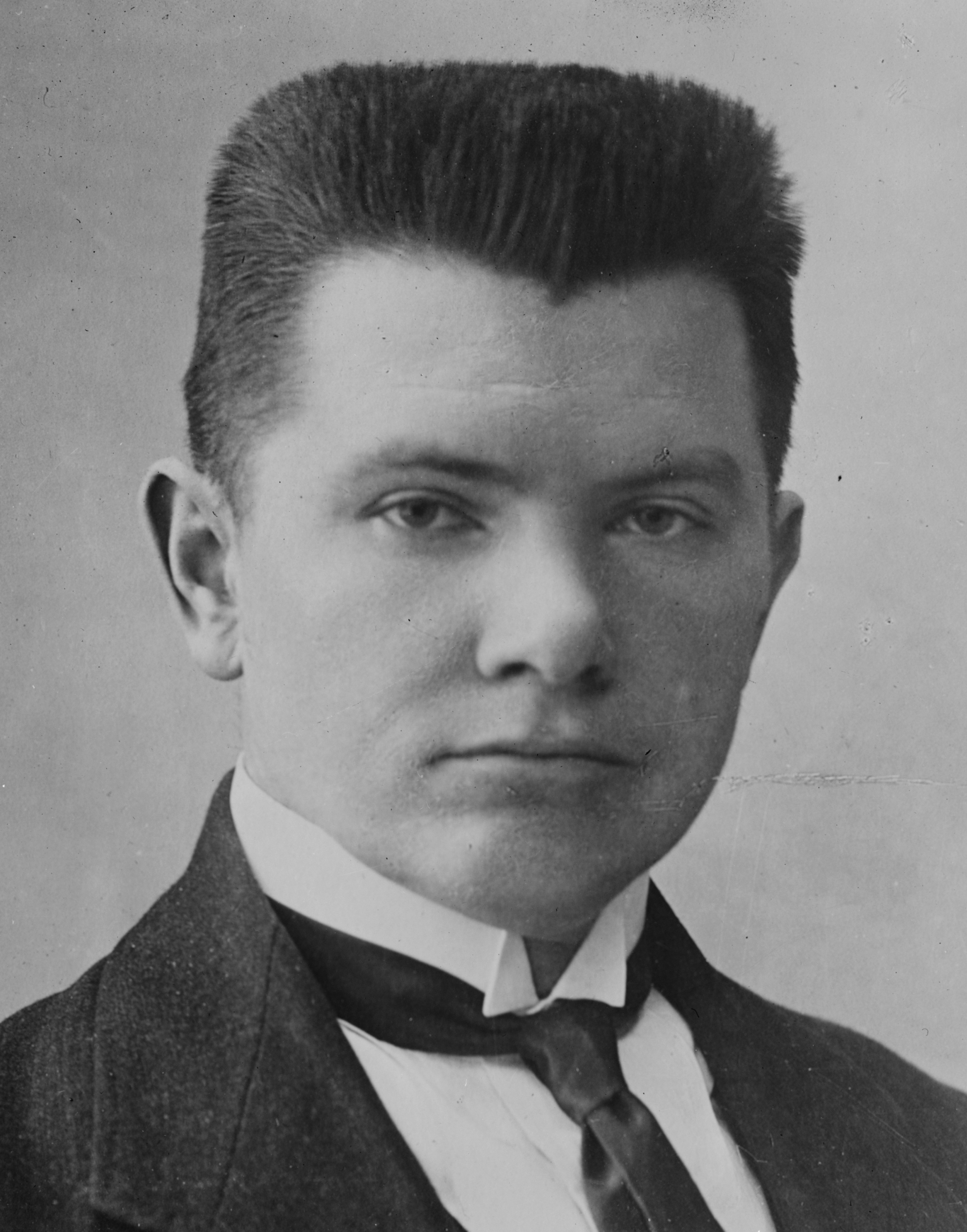
Augustinas Voldemaras

=== Independent Lithuania (1918–1940) ===
Lithuania's diplomacy has extensive roots going back to the era of King Mindaugas, yet modern-day diplomacy of the Republic of Lithuania is believed to have been born on 7 November 1918. On this day, Augustinas Voldemaras, then Prime Minister of Lithuania, assumed the office of the Foreign Minister, thus heralding the formation of the country's Foreign Ministry.

Today, 7 November is celebrated as the Day of the Diplomat. In 1918, Lithuanian diplomacy's goal number one was to achieve de jure recognition of the restored state of Lithuania, and to demarcate its borders. On 23 November 1918, Jurgis Šaulys was appointed Lithuania's first minister extraordinary and plenipotentiary in Germany. On 11 January 1919, Lithuania signed the first international agreement on communication by post was signed with Germany. The second agreement was made with Latvia, granting this country a loan in exchange for the right of Lithuania to use the port of Liepāja for transportation of goods and services.

At the time, the FM was developing its system of diplomatic orders and ranks in accordance with customs of global diplomacy. On 22 May 1920, the following FM functions were established: minister, vice-minister, advisers on church and consular matters, and a General Department and an Information Department were set up. The organisational structure of the FM has changed several times, with the following three departments established on a standing basis in the long run: the Policy Department, the Legal and Administration Department, and the Economics Department. In early 1940, the FM had 218 employees with 123 of them working at the head office and 95 at foreign missions and consulates.

Contemporary diplomatic practice demanded that the ambassador's title only be bestowed on representatives from major states, the highest diplomatic ranks in Lithuania prior to its occupation were envoy extraordinary and minister plenipotentiary. Before Lithuania lost its independence, it had active missions to Berlin, Buenos Aires, Brussels, London, Moscow, Paris, the Holy See, Rome, Stockholm, Tallinn, Washington, Warsaw, Geneva, Prague. The most important achievements during the period of independence for Lithuania were the de jure recognition of Lithuania's statehood. On 12 July 1920, Lithuania signed a Peace Agreement with the Soviet Russia, whereby "Russia recognizes the autonomy and independence of the State of Lithuania with all the legal implication of such recognition with no reservations, and waives all of Russia's rights of sovereignty it has had towards the people and the territory of Lithuania in good will and for all time".

One year later, on 14 May 1921 a Lithuania–Latvia agreement was signed in Riga. Under the agreement, Lithuania received Palanga while Latvia received Aknīste and agreed to conclude all territorial disputes. On 22 September 1921, Lithuania was accepted to the League of Nations. Other significant diplomatic achievements were as follows: the signing of the Klaipėda Convention legalizing the annexation of the region to Lithuania between the Republic of Lithuania and the Conference of Ambassadors in Paris on 8 May 1924, the entry into a concordat with the Vatican on 27 September 1927, and the Lithuania–Germany border agreement of 29 January 1928, which legalized the national border after Lithuanian annexed the Klaipėda region. Furthermore, on 12 September 1934, Lithuania, Latvia, and Estonia signed a cooperation agreement establishing the so-called Baltic Entente.

=== Soviet occupation (1940–1990) ===
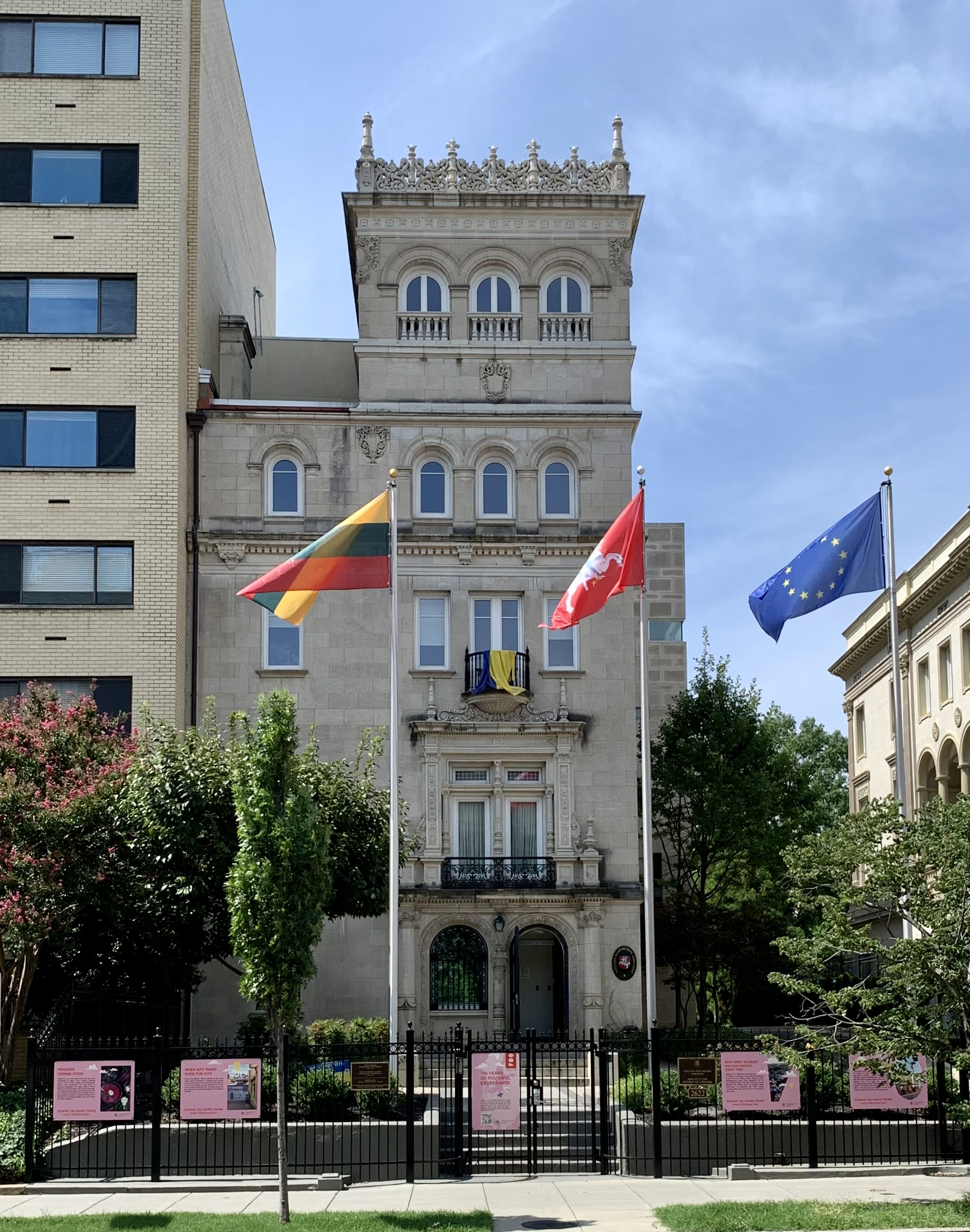
Embassy of Lithuania in Washington

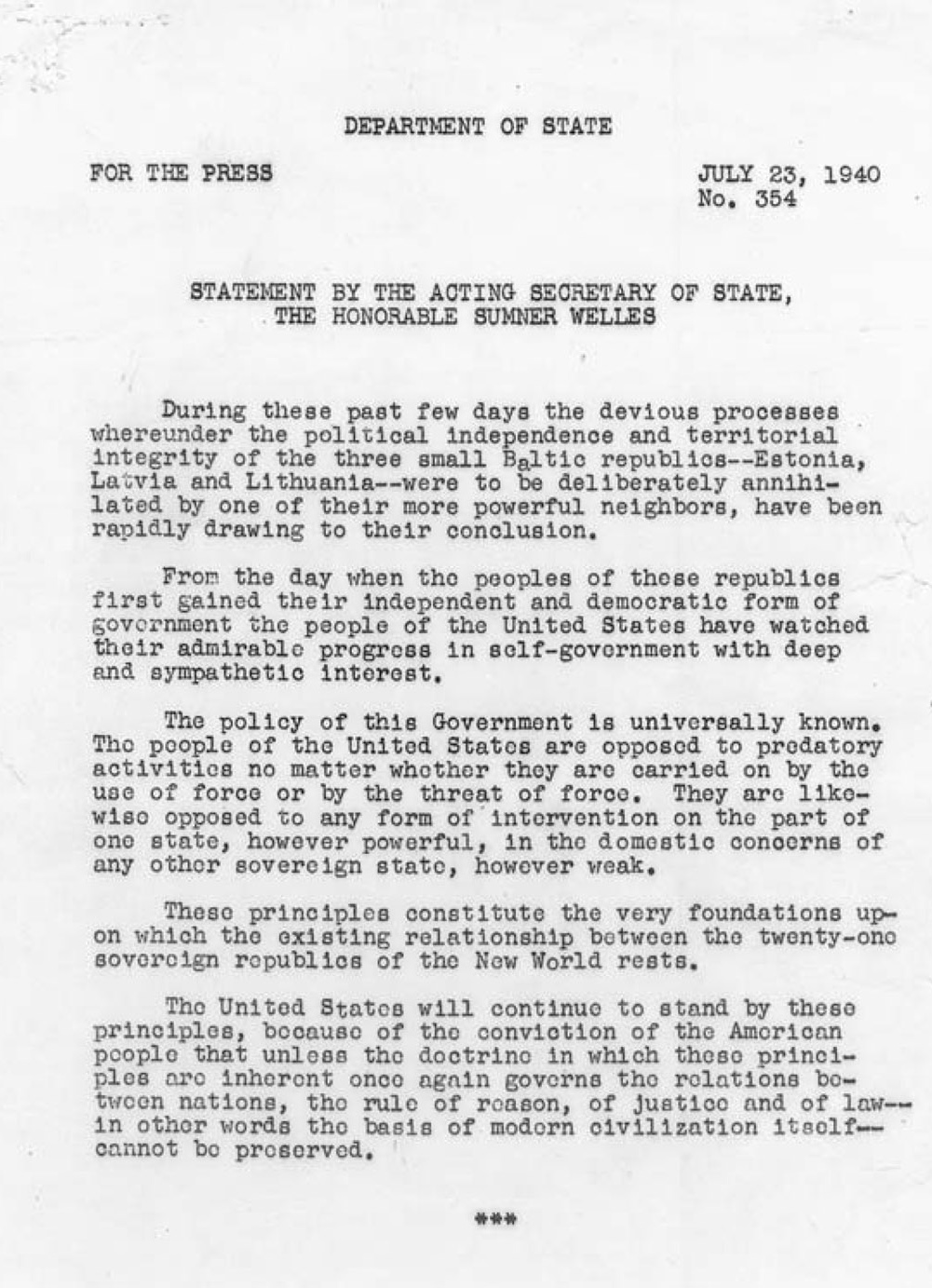
Welles Declaration (1940) which stated that the US would not recognize the annexation of the Baltic States

Lithuania's occupation by the Soviet Union on 15 June 1940 did not bring the operations of the diplomatic service to a halt, but made the coordination of its activities from Lithuanian soil impossible. National diplomats residing abroad ended their relations with the occupation government of the Lithuanian Soviet Socialist Republic and launched a diplomatic campaign for the liberation of Lithuania. In his telegram dated 31 May 1940, the last Foreign Minister Juozas Urbšys provisioned that, in the event of occupation, Stasys Lozoraitis, minister extraordinary and plenipotentiary to Rome, be appointed the head of the Lithuanian diplomatic service. Furthermore, he named Petras Klimas, the minister extraordinary and plenipotentiary to France as Lozoraitis' first assistant and Jurgis Šaulys, minister extraordinary and plenipotentiary to Switzerland, as his second assistant. The Lithuanian diplomatic service became a Government in exile that was a critical piece to ensuring the recognition of the continuity of Lithuanian legal statehood until independence after the Dissolution of the Soviet Union.

During the period of occupation, operations of the Lithuanian diplomatic service were heavily burdened as the Soviet Union had taken over some of the mission buildings and parts of Lithuania's gold reserves. Despite protests from Lithuania's diplomats, some states (such as Italy, Germany, Sweden, France) complied with Soviet demands to turn over Lithuanian diplomatic property. On 23 July 1940, US Undersecretary of State Sumner Welles, declared that the US would not recognize the Baltics' incorporation into the Soviet Union on the basis of the Stimson Doctrine. The US thus allowed Lithuanian diplomats to continue to work on its territory in Washington, D.C., New York, and Chicago and refused to surrender Lithuania's gold reserves to the Soviets, however it billed from it for the embassies. France and Switzerland never complied with Soviet requests to transfer the gold, and in 1991 returned the original bars with Smetona's stamp to the Re-Established State of Lithuania. The United Kingdom, despite having closed Lithuania's mission to London, allowed envoy Bronius Kazys Balutis to continue to work in the country as well.

The Lithuanian diplomatic service managed to preserve representation in key Western states until 1990. After the death of Stasys Lozoraitis in 1983, the post of the head of the diplomatic service was assumed by Stasys Antanas Bačkis, minister plenipotentiary to Washington, D.C. On 15 November 1987, he surrendered his position of the chief of the mission to Washington to Stasys Lozoraitis Jr., and returned to Paris.

After World War II, the legation was replaced by the embassy as the standard form of diplomatic mission. However, Lithuania could not receive a U.S. ambassador since its territory was controlled by the Soviet Union. Therefore, the Lithuanian legation remained in the form of a legation until the end of the Cold War. By 1990, the three Baltic legations were the only legations remaining on the U.S. State Department's Diplomatic List.

==== Finances ====
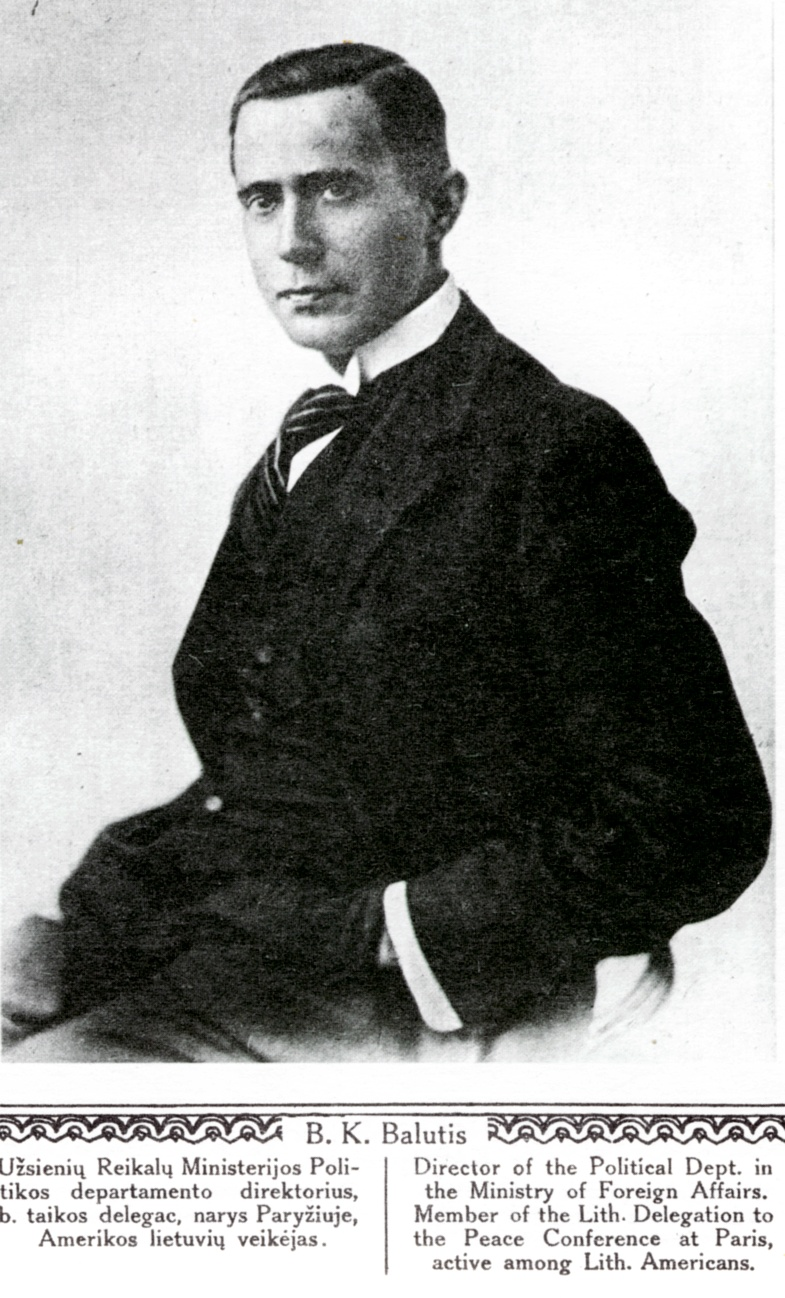
Bronius Kazys Balutis

One of the persistent difficulties of the diplomatic service was to obtain funds for its activities. The first few months were financed by funds held on hand, personal loans, and other improvised means. All legations and consulates cut salaries and other expenses, reducing their budgets 3–4 times. In August 1940, diplomats envisioned creation of a special fund, supported by donations of Lithuanian diaspora, particularly Lithuanian Americans. However, the solution was not ideal as the diplomatic service would have become dependent on various political groups of Lithuanian Americans. Therefore, the idea was abandoned when the United States Department of State agreed to allow the diplomats to draw on Lithuanian reserves held by the Federal Reserve Bank of New York.

Before June 1940, Lithuania had gold reserves in the United States (Federal Reserve), United Kingdom (Bank of England), France (Banque de France), Sweden (Sveriges Riksbank), and Switzerland (Bank for International Settlements). Sweden transferred the funds to the Soviet Union. Initially, England froze the reserves and refused to transfer it to either Lithuanian diplomats or the Soviet Union; however, in 1967, the First Wilson ministry used the reserve in settling mutual claims with the Soviet Union. Swiss bank secrecy laws prevented the transfer of the gold to Lithuanian diplomats. Reserves in France were similarly not available. Thus only the funds held by the Federal Reserve were available: 2,493.61 kilograms (80,171 ozt) of gold reserve and a currency reserve.

The funds were made available, but were supervised by the State Department and the Department of the Treasury. With limited exceptions, the funds were made available only for the use of American embassies and consulates. Therefore, embassies elsewhere, such as the Holy See, had to be subsidized by the Lithuanian embassy in Washington. Initially, the diplomats drew only on the currency reserve, which sustained the diplomatic service until 1950. The gold reserve, valued at approximately $2.8 million, was sold in 1950 and 1955 and conservatively invested into Treasury bills and diversified industrial shares. The annual budget of the diplomatic service was approximately $100,000. Therefore, the funds lasted until 1980.

Once the funds were exhausted, Lithuanian diplomats and American officials considered various solutions: donations by the Lithuanian community, consolidation or closure of Lithuanian consulates, sale of the embassy building in Washington, direct financing by the U.S. (Representative Charles F. Dougherty introduced HR 5407 to that effect), loan from the U.S., etc. Eventually, a solution was found when State Department brokered a deal with the Latvian diplomatic service, which was much better off financially. Based on a verbal agreement, made on 30 January 1980 between Anatols Dinbergs and Stasys Antanas Bačkis, Latvians agreed to provide interest-free annual loan of $120,000 from investment returns generated on their reserves to the Lithuanians. The last such loan, increased to $148,000, was received in mid 1991. In total, Latvians loaned $1.523 million. The principal of the loan, unindexed and without interest, was repaid by independent Lithuania in 2005.

=== Lithuania (since 1990) ===
Algirdas Saudargas

After Lithuania declared the restoration of independence on 11 March 1990, steps had to be taken to consolidate the previously exiled diplomatic service into the new national government. A great contribution in this respect was made by surviving diplomats in the US, Vatican, Canada, Venezuela, whom Lithuania still recognized. Shortly, on 17 June, the Foreign Ministry was reinstated, with Algirdas Saudargas appointed its first head. On 11 February 1991, Lithuania's independence was recognized by Iceland, and on 17 September 1991, the country was accepted to the United Nations. One of the first critical diplomatic achievements was the agreement with the Russia Federation laying down the grounds for cross-border relations that was signed on 29 July 1991. Both states undertook to fairly comply with the generally recognized principles and norms of international law in their relationship. The signing of this agreement was followed by yet another achievement: the full withdrawal of the Soviet Armed Forces from Lithuania by 31 August 1993.

On 26 April 1994, the Republic of Lithuania and Poland signed an agreement on friendly relations and good neighboring cooperation, laying down a foundation for the strategic partnership between the two countries. Lithuania's accession to NATO on 29 March 2004 was an important factor that consolidated the country's independence; the foundations for the accession were laid in Washington on 1 February 1998, when the US, Lithuania, Latvia, and Estonia signed a Partnership Charter. The Charter endorsed a common goal of working together to create conditions for the integration of the so-called Vilnius Group into European and trans-Atlantic political, economic, and security structures, including NATO.

Another achievement was Lithuania entering the European Union on 1 May 2004 and the Schengen Area on 21 December 2007. In 2011, Lithuania was the first Baltic state to preside over the Organization for Security and Co-operation in Europe. The presidency helped Lithuania boost its influence in international affairs. In the second half of 2013, the country presided over the Council of the European Union. On 17 October 2013, Lithuania was elected, by majority vote, non-permanent member of the UN Security Council for the 2014–2015 term and presided over the Council in February 2014 and May 2015.

== Activities ==
The diplomatic service of the Republic of Lithuania consists of diplomats working at the Foreign Ministry and foreign diplomatic missions of the Republic of Lithuania under the Foreign Ministry including embassies of the Republic of Lithuania to international organisations, consular establishments, special missions, and negotiation groups; diplomats working at the Office of the President of the Republic of Lithuania, the Office of the Parliament, the Office of the Government, ministries, other governmental institutions or bodies as well as diplomats transferred to international organisations or institutions, European Union institutions or bodies, joint European Commission or Council institutions, joint European Commission and European Union organisations, civil international operations or missions, or foreign institutions on a provisional basis, in the manner prescribed by the Law on Delegating Persons to European Union Institutions or Foreign Institutions of the Republic of Lithuania.

The Republic of Lithuania has its diplomatic missions to foreign states and international organisations to maintain official relations with international organisations, enforce the foreign policy of the Republic of Lithuania, and protect the rights and legitimate interests of the Republic of Lithuania, its citizens, companies, and other legal entities. Diplomats abroad also negotiate with the government of the host country, protect the rights and interests of citizens and companies, legally obtain, collect, and transmit to the FM information, promote friendly cross-border relations, disseminate information about Lithuania, and maintain and strengthen the relationship between Lithuanians residing in the host country and Lithuania. Diplomatic missions of the Republic of Lithuania are directly subordinate to the Foreign Ministry.

== Heads of the Lithuanian Diplomatic Service ==
No.	Portrait	Name	Term	Notes
1		Stasys Lozoraitis	15 June 1940 – 24 December 1983	Assumed office after the Soviet invasion of Lithuania in 1940.
2		Stasys Bačkis	24 December 1983 – 15 November 1987	Assumed office after the death of Stasys Lozoraitis in 1983.
–		Stasys Lozoraitis Jr.	15 November 1987 – 6 September 1991	Became de facto Head of the Diplomatic Service after Stasys Bačkis left Washington, D.C. in 1988.

== Diplomatic ranks ==
- Ambassador extraordinary and plenipotentiary of the Republic of Lithuania;
- Envoy extraordinary and minister plenipotentiary of the Republic of Lithuania;
- Minister Counsellor;
- Advisor;
- First Secretary;
- Second Secretary;
- Third Secretary
- Attaché

== Locations ==
Lithuania has 29 foreign missions, 41 embassies, 8 consulates general, 3 consulates, 1 embassy office, 7 missions to international organisations, and 1 special mission.

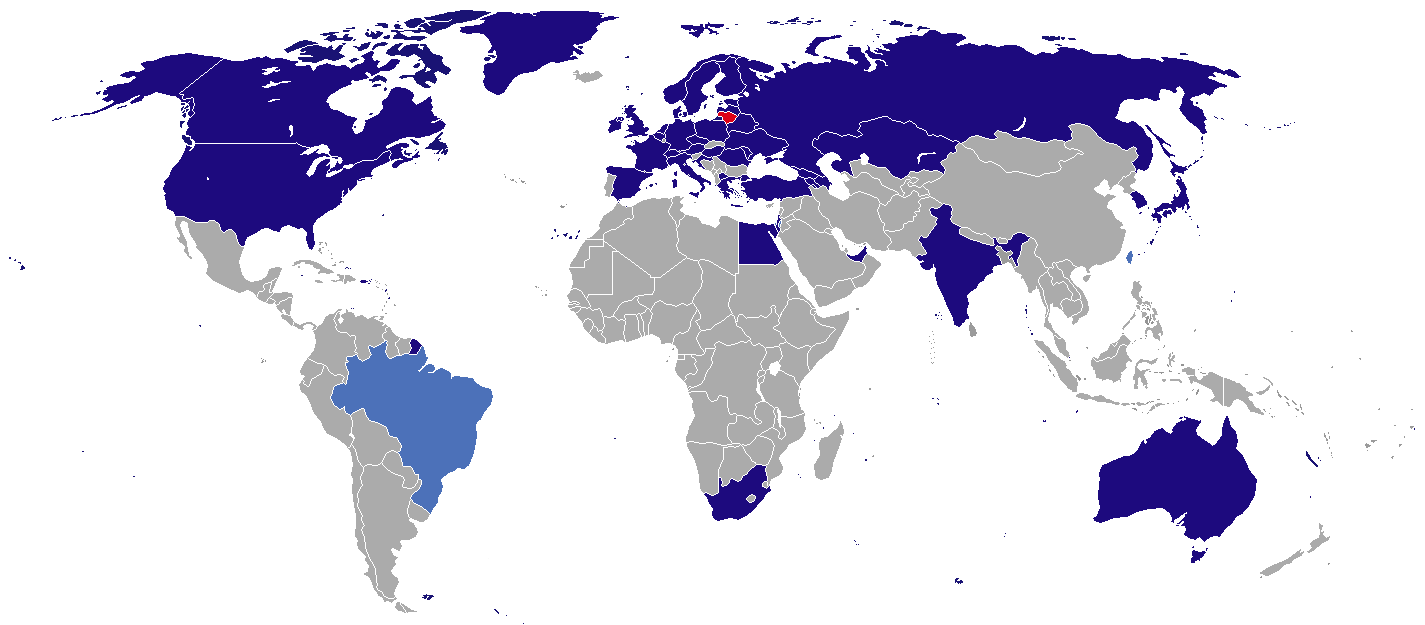
Lithuanian Diplomatic missions

== See also ==
- State continuity of the Baltic states
- Estonian Diplomatic Service (1940–1991)
- Latvian diplomatic service in exile
- Baltic Legations (1940–1991)
