= Stasys Antanas Bačkis =

Lithuanian diplomat (1906-1999)

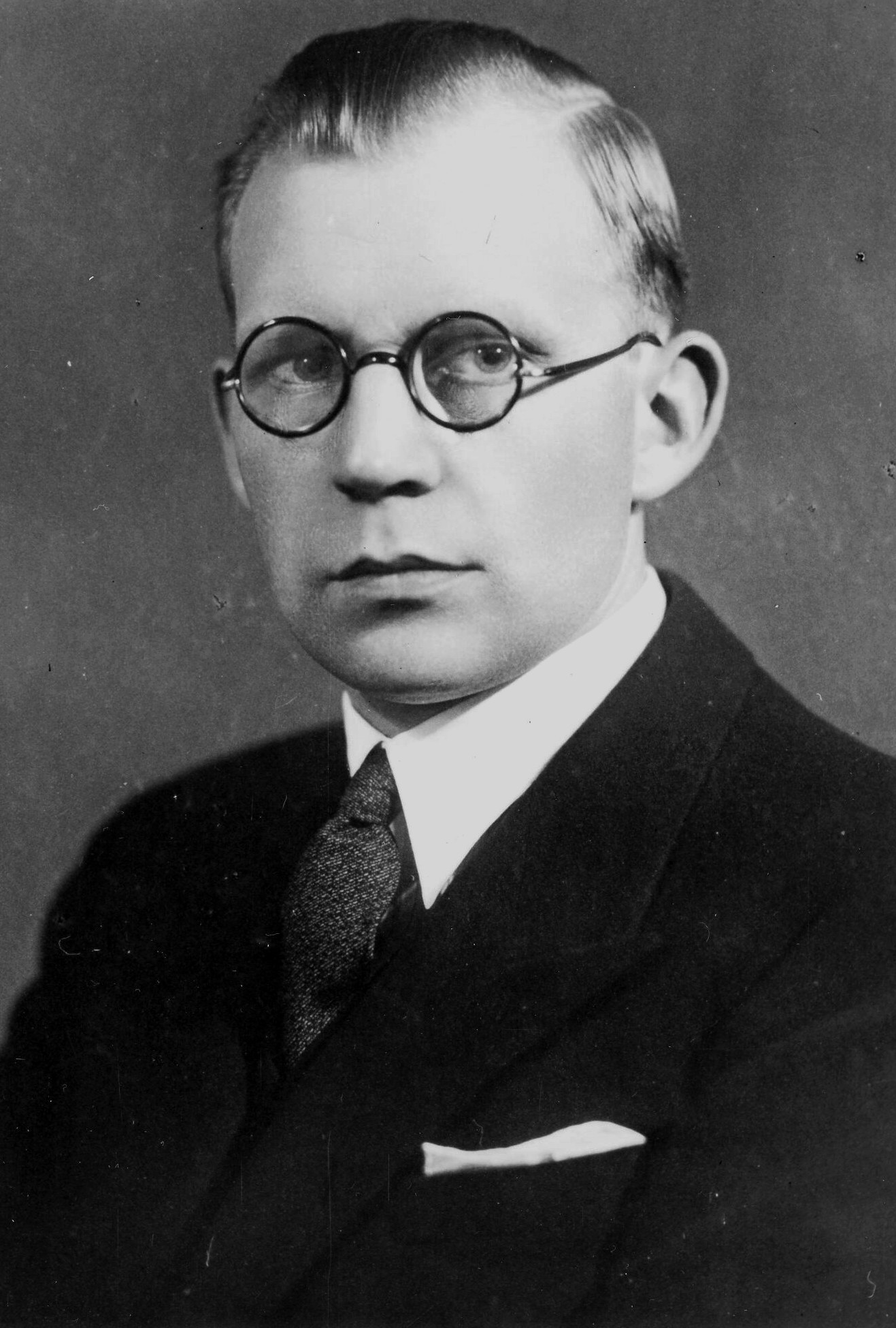
- Bačkis in ~1940-1950
- Born: 10 February 1906; Kovno Governorate, Russian Empire
- Died: 10 November 1999 (aged 93); Vilnius, Lithuania
- Burial place: Antakalnis Cemetery
- Education: University of Paris
- Children: Audrys Juozas Bačkis

Head of the Lithuanian Diplomatic Service
- In office 24 December 1983 – 15 November 1987
- Preceded by: Stasys Lozoraitis
- Succeeded by: Stasys Lozoraitis Jr.

Stasys Antanas Bačkis (10 February 1906 – 10 November 1999) was a Lithuanian diplomat and civil servant who served as an assistant in the Lithuanian Ministry of Foreign Affairs from 1930 until 1938, Head of the Lithuanian Embassy in Paris and later Head of the Lithuanian Diplomatic Service in Washington D.C. from 1983 until 1987.

A graduate of the University of Paris, Bačkis became an employee of the Lithuanian Ministry of Foreign Affairs in 1930. In 1938, he was stationed at the Lithuanian embassy in Paris. After the occupation of Lithuania by the Soviet Union in June 1940, Lithuanian diplomats did not recognize the new Soviet government and established the Lithuanian Diplomatic Service that functioned in conditions of exile, continued to represent independent Lithuania, and preserved the legal continuity of the state. After the arrest of ambassador Petras Klimas, Bačkis actively headed the unofficial Lithuanian embassy in Paris until 1960 when he relocated to Washington, D.C. After the death of Stasys Lozoraitis, Bačkis was the chief of the Lithuanian Diplomatic Service from 1983 until his return to Paris in 1988. Bačkis was the father of Cardinal Audrys Juozas Bačkis.

== Biography ==
=== Early life and career ===
Bačkis was in born in Pantakoniai, Kovno Governorate, Russian Empire. After graduation from the Panevėžys Gymnasium, he received a stipend form the Ministry of Foreign Affairs and attended the University of Paris where he studied law and political science. After graduation in 1930, he joined the Lithuanian Diplomatic Service where he worked as a secretary. He mainly translated and edited various diplomatic documents to French. He also published various articles in the Lithuanian press. From 1934 to 1938, he was a personal secretary of Stasys Lozoraitis, Minister of Foreign Affairs. In this capacity, Bačkis participated in the assemblies of the Baltic Entente and League of Nations as well as the coronation of King George VI and Queen Elizabeth. He received the Swedish Order of the Polar Star in 1935 and Italian Order of the Crown of Italy in 1937. He was also rector of Valančius People's University (a folk high school) established by Pavasarininkai.

=== Diplomat in Paris ===
In August 1938, he joined the Lithuanian embassy in Paris as first secretary. On 14 June 1940, German forces entered undefended Paris. A day later, Lithuania was occupied by the Soviet Union. That left Lithuanian diplomats in Paris in a precarious situation. Ambassador Petras Klimas retreated south with Vichy France officials leaving Bačkis as the senior diplomat in Paris. Lithuania was converted to the Lithuanian SSR and incorporated into the Soviet Union. Klimas and other Lithuanian diplomats protested these developments and refused to transfer their posts to Soviet officials creating the Lithuanian Diplomatic Service. Acting in conditions of exile, the service continued to represent independent Republic of Lithuania. Pressured by French and Soviet officials, Bačkis surrendered the embassy building to the Soviets on 23 August 1940. However, diplomatic privileges for existing à titre personnel diplomats were not revoked. That mean that Bačkis' diplomat identification would be annually renewed and that he could continue his diplomatic work and consular assistance. He did so from his private apartment until his departure to the United States in 1960.

Bačkis' family in Lithuania was persecuted by the Soviets; his brother Juozas was deported to Siberia in June 1941 where he died a year later. Klimas was arrested by the Gestapo in September 1943 which left Bačkis as the senior diplomat in France. The same year, Bačkis defended his PhD thesis on the Lithuanian Concordat (published in Lithuanian in 2007; ISBN 9789986592563). After the war, France did not officially recognize Lithuanian, Latvian, or Estonian Diplomatic Services, but allowed them to function unofficially. Bačkis continued to educate various officials about Lithuania's occupation and lobby for non-recognition of the Lithuanian SSR to ensure state continuity. He also published informational bulletins on Lithuanian affairs (including 33 issues of Questions Lithuaniennes, 8 issues of Bulletin Lithuanien, and book Peuples opprimés. La tragédie des Etats Baltes), helped Lithuanian refugees, etc. In 1948, Bačkis made contacts with Juozas Lukša, an anti-Soviet partisan who managed to escape the Iron Curtain, and helped him spread information about the armed struggle.

The reigning European basketball champion Lithuania men's national basketball team, who has won the EuroBasket 1939 in Kaunas, Lithuania, was dissolved due to the occupations of Lithuania in 1940–1944. In 1946, the first European basketball championship after the war was held – EuroBasket 1946 in Geneva, Switzerland. Consequently, Bačkis has invited representatives of the Lithuanian diaspora, ordered outfits of the Lithuania men's national basketball team and the team (which was considered by many contemporary experts as the Europe's strongest) began to prepare for the EuroBasket 1946. However, the Soviet Union strictly protested against the Lithuanian national team's participation in the championship and the International Basketball Federation (FIBA) yielded to its pressure by not allowing the Lithuanians to independently compete at the EuroBasket 1946.

In 1949, Committee on Central and Eastern European Countries, chaired by British MP Harold Macmillan and representing various Eastern Bloc nations, was established by the European Movement. Bačkis became vice-chairman of the Committee in 1951. He was also a Lithuanian representative to the Union of European Federalists, joined the Nouvelles équipes internationales (New International Teams), and Assembly of Captive European Nations. Bačkis also urged reestablishment of the Lithuanian Catholic Academy of Science and actively presented research papers in its sessions. In 1950, he was awarded the Order of St. Gregory the Great by the Vatican.

Bačkis was financially supported by the Supreme Committee for the Liberation of Lithuania and by the Embassy of Lithuania in Washington, D.C. which had access to pre-war Lithuanian gold reserves kept by the Federal Reserve. After the death of Povilas Žadeikis, Lithuanian ambassador in Washington, D.C., in 1957, there was a need to strengthen the American mission. Bačkis agreed to relocate to the United States. In Paris, he was replaced by part-time Stasys Lozoraitis, who was based in Rome, and his deputy Jurgis Baltrušaitis.

=== Diplomat in Washington, D.C. ===
Bačkis departed France on 15 June 1960. The Embassy of Lithuania in Washington, D.C. was headed by Juozas Kajeckas who maintained contacts with the United States Department of State that controlled the pre-war gold reserves and funded the entire Lithuanian Diplomatic Service. Therefore, he thought the embassy was particularly important. Other diplomats did not approve his attitude and criticized his attempts to control the diplomatic service through finances. Kajackas' health deteriorated in 1975 and he reluctantly agreed to resign in June 1976. Bačkis was promoted to chargé d'affaires. In August 1978, Stasys Lozoraitis appointed Bačkis his deputy and successor.

By 1980, the gold reserve was exhausted and the Lithuanian diplomatic service faced the possibility that it would have to close due to lack of funds. Bačkis actively sought out solutions. In January 1980, the Department of State organized a meeting between Bačkis and Anatols Dinbergs, head of the Latvian Diplomatic Service. In the meeting, Dinbergs agreed to loan $120,000 (equivalent to $469,000 in 2025) annually to the Lithuanians from the Latvian gold reserves. While the budget was minimal, it guaranteed survival of the Lithuanian Diplomatic Service. Another critical issues was finding replacements for naturally ageing diplomats. The Department of State long held that only diplomats who were in service prior to June 1940 would be accepted. Without the ability to accept new blood, the diplomatic service would naturally die out. A group of Lithuanian Americans petitioned Stephen Aiello, Special Assistant to President Jimmy Carter for Ethnic Affairs, and the position was reversed in fall 1980. Bačkis had difficulty finding a future replacement for himself as he could offer a salary of only $10,000 (equivalent to $39,100 in 2025). In 1983, Stasys Lozoraitis Jr. agreed to become advisor to and eventual successor of Bačkis. Another challenge facing Bačkis was repairs of the embassy building. Built in 1909, the building sorely needed major repairs, particularly after the May 1979 bombing at the next-door Cuban Interests Section. Bačkis managed to raise about $130,000 (equivalent to $460,000 in 2025) from Lithuanian Americans and repaired the building in 1981–1983.

Stasys Lozoraitis, head of the Lithuanian Diplomatic Service, died on 24 December 1983. Bačkis, pursuant to a previous decree by Lozoraitis, assumed the position. However, in March 1986, while crossing a street Bačkis was hit by a car and severely injured. After a few months in a hospital, he returned to work but poor health forced him to resign in favor of Stasys Lozoraitis Jr. in November 1987. Bačkis remained the head of the diplomatic service. After the death of Jurgis Baltrušaitis in 1988, Bačkis decided to return to Paris and, health permitting, resume his unofficial position there. That left Lozoraitis a de facto leader of the diplomatic service.

=== Post-independence ===
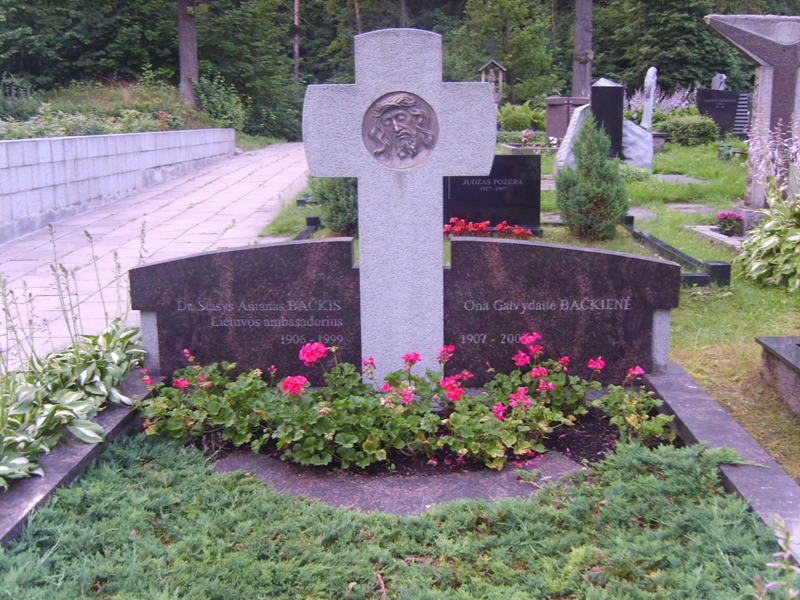
Antanas Bačkis' grave at Antakalnis Cemetery

Lithuania declared independence on 11 March 1990. The diplomats rejoiced the news, but were very careful not to surrender their positions to the new fragile Lithuanian government. After the August 1991 Putsch, western countries officially recognized independent Lithuania. On 6 September 1991, Bačkis sent a resignation letter to Algirdas Saudargas, Minister of Foreign Affairs. That officially ended the Lithuanian Diplomatic Service in exile.

In May 1992, Bačkis accompanied French president François Mitterrand on his official visit to Lithuania. In April 1993, Bačkis returned to Lithuania permanently. In 1996, he was awarded the Grand Gross of the Order of the Lithuanian Grand Duke Gediminas and the Officer rank of the Legion of Honour. He died in 1999 in Vilnius and was buried in Antakalnis Cemetery.
