= Stasys Lozoraitis Jr. =

Lithuanian diplomat and politician

Stasys Lozoraitis

Head of the Lithuanian Diplomatic Service (de facto)
- In office 15 November 1987 – 6 September 1991
- Preceded by: Stasys Bačkis
- Succeeded by: Algirdas Saudargas as Minister of Foreign Affairs

Personal details
- Born: 2 August 1924 Berlin, Germany
- Died: 13 June 1994 (aged 69) Georgetown University Hospital, United States
- Party: Independent
- Parent: Stasys Lozoraitis (father)
- Education: Sapienza University of Rome

Stasys Lozoraitis Jr. (August 2, 1924 – June 13, 1994) was a Lithuanian diplomat and politician who served as the Head of the Lithuanian Diplomatic Service from 1987 to 1991, Chief Diplomat to the United States 1991 to 1993 and Ambassador to Italy 1993 to 1994. He was a son of the famous diplomat Stasys Lozoraitis (1898–1983) and brother of Kazys Lozoraitis.

Lozoraitis studied law at the Sapienza University of Rome from 1944 to 1948. He worked at the Lithuanian legation to the Holy See in Rome from 1943. In 1970, after death of Stasys Girdvainis, Lozoraitis became the chargé d’affaires in Rome. On November 15, 1987, Lozoraitis succeeded Stasys Bačkis as the leader of Lithuania's diplomatic service in exile, the position held by his father until 1983. The diplomatic service, based in Washington, D.C., was representation of interwar independent Lithuania and did not recognize the authority of the Lithuanian SSR, a republic of the Soviet Union.

In March 1990, Lithuania declared restoration of its independence. On September 6, 1991, following August Putsch in Moscow and international recognition of independent Lithuania, Lozoraitis resigned the diplomatic service in favor of the national government established in Vilnius. In December 1991, he was appointed as the new government's chief diplomat to the United States, where he re-established the embassy. He was a candidate in the Lithuanian presidential election of February 1993, gathering 38.9% of vote and losing to Algirdas Brazauskas. In May 1993, just a few months after the election, Brazauskas recalled Lozoraitis as ambassador to the U.S. despite criticism of politicizing the issue. In late 1993, Lozoraitis was appointed as the ambassador to Italy.

Lozoraitis died of liver failure at Georgetown University Hospital. He was buried in Putnam, Connecticut, in a Lithuanian Roman Catholic cemetery; he was reburied in Petrašiūnai Cemetery in Kaunas in 1999. The same year he was posthumously awarded the Order of the Cross of Vytis. Documentary Vilties prezidentas (The President of Hope) was produced by Vytautas V. Landsbergis in 1996.
