= Lithuania =

Country in Northern Europe

Republic of Lithuania Lietuvos Respublika
- Flag Coat of arms
- Anthem: Tautiška giesmė "National Song"
- Location of Lithuania (dark green) – in Europe (green & dark grey) – in the European Union (green) – [Legend]
- Capital and largest city: Vilnius; 54°41′N 25°19′E
- Official languages: Lithuanian
- Ethnic groups (2026): 82.1% Lithuanians; 6.2% Poles; 4.9% Russians; 2.3% Ukrainians; 2.0% Belarusians; 2.5% others
- Religion (2021): 79.4% Christianity; 74.2% Catholicism; 5.2% other Christian; 6.1% no religion; 0.8% others; 13.7% no answer
- Demonym: Lithuanian
- Government: Unitary semi-presidential republic
  - President: Gitanas Nausėda
  - Prime Minister: Mindaugas Sinkevičius
  - Seimas Speaker: Juozas Olekas
- Legislature: Seimas

Formation
  - First mentioned: 9 March 1009
  - Grand Duchy: 1236
  - Coronation of Mindaugas: 6 July 1253
  - Union with Poland: 2 February 1386
  - Commonwealth created: 1 July 1569
  - Partitioned: 24 October 1795
  - Independence reinstated: 16 February 1918
  - Soviet occupation: 16 June 1940
  - Independence restored: 11 March 1990

Area
  - Total: 65,300 km^{2} (25,200 sq mi) (121st)
  - Water (%): 1.98 (2015)

Population
  - 2025 estimate: ▲2,897,430 (137th)
  - Density: 46/km^{2} (119.1/sq mi) (174th)
- GDP (PPP): 2026 estimate
  - Total: ▲$177.443 billion (87th)
  - Per capita: ▲$61,229 (33th)
- GDP (nominal): 2026 estimate
  - Total: ▲$104.721 billion (77th)
  - Per capita: ▲$36,135 (38th)
- Gini (2023): ▼35.7 medium inequality
- HDI (2023): ▲0.895 very high (39th)
- Currency: Euro (€) (EUR)
- Time zone: UTC+2 (EET)
  - Summer (DST): UTC+3 (EEST)
- Date format: yyyy-mm-dd (Note: Lithuania uses ISO 8601 standard for date and time.)
- Calling code: +370
- ISO 3166 code: LT
- Internet TLD: .lt

Lithuania, (Note: /ˌlɪθjuˈeɪniə/ LITH-ew-AY-nee-ə; Lietuva (Lithuanian) [lʲiətʊˈvɐ]) officially the Republic of Lithuania, (Note: Lietuvos Respublika (Lithuanian) [lʲiətʊˈvoːs rʲɛsˈpʊblʲɪkɐ]) is a country in the Baltic region of Europe. (Note: Various sources classify Lithuania differently for statistical and other purposes. For example, United Nations, and Eurovoc (which additionally classifies Lithuania as central and eastern European country), among others, classify it as northern Europe. The European Commission, European Bank for Reconstruction and Development and the Columbia Encyclopedia place Lithuania in central Europe. The CIA World Factbook classifies it as eastern Europe, and Encyclopædia Britannica locates it in northeastern Europe. Usage varies greatly, and controversially, in press sources.) It is one of three Baltic states and lies on the eastern shore of the Baltic Sea, bordered by Latvia to the north, Belarus to the east and south, Poland to the south, and the Russian semi-exclave of Kaliningrad Oblast to the southwest, with a maritime border with Sweden to the west. Lithuania covers an area of 65,300 km^{2} (25,200 sq mi), and has a population of 2.9 million. Its capital and largest city is Vilnius; other major cities include Kaunas, Klaipėda, Šiauliai and Panevėžys. Lithuanians are the titular nation, belong to the ethnolinguistic group of Balts, and speak Lithuanian.

For millennia, the southeastern shores of the Baltic Sea were inhabited by various Baltic tribes. In the 1230s, Lithuanian lands were united for the first time by Mindaugas, who formed the Kingdom of Lithuania on 6 July 1253. Subsequent expansion and consolidation resulted in the Grand Duchy of Lithuania, which by the 14th century was the largest country in Europe. In 1386, the grand duchy entered into a de facto personal union with the Crown of the Kingdom of Poland. The two realms were united into the Polish-Lithuanian Commonwealth in 1569, forming one of the largest and most prosperous states in Europe. The commonwealth lasted more than two centuries, until neighbouring countries gradually dismantled it between 1772 and 1795, with the Russian Empire annexing most of Lithuania's territory.

Towards the end of World War I, Lithuania declared independence in 1918, founding the modern Republic of Lithuania. In World War II, Lithuania was occupied by the Soviet Union, then by Nazi Germany, before being reoccupied by the Soviets in 1944. Lithuanian armed resistance to the Soviet occupation lasted until the early 1950s. On 11 March 1990, a year before the formal dissolution of the Soviet Union, Lithuania became the first Soviet republic to break away when it proclaimed the restoration of its independence.

Lithuania is a developed country with a high-income and an advanced economy ranking very high in Human Development Index. Lithuania ranks highly in digital infrastructure, press freedom and happiness. It is a member of the United Nations, the European Union, the Council of Europe, the Council of the Baltic Sea States, the Eurozone, the Nordic Investment Bank, the International Monetary Fund, the Schengen Agreement, NATO, OECD and the WHO. It also participates in the Nordic-Baltic Eight (NB8) regional co-operation format.

== Etymology ==
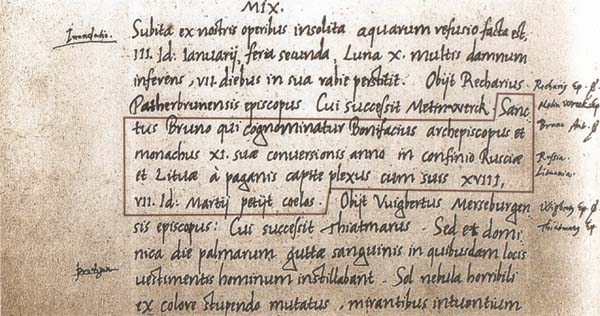
Earliest mention of Lithuania (Litua, on line 7) in the entry for 1009 in the 11th-century Annals of Quedlinburg, Dresden, Sächsische Landesbibliothek, Q.113, fol 31r.

The spelling of Lithuania was a later addition to the original Latinate Lituania since 1800 as a form of hyperforeignism influenced by Greek loanwords with the theta; it is ultimately from Lithuanian: Lietuva. The first known record of Lietuva is in a 1009 story of Saint Bruno in the Annals of Quedlinburg. The chronicle records Latinised form of the name Lietuva: Litua. The true meaning of the name is unknown, and scholars still debate it. There are a few plausible versions.

Lietava, a small stream near Kernavė—the core area of the early Lithuanian state and a possible first capital of the eventual Grand Duchy of Lithuania—is usually credited as the source of the name. However, the stream is very small, and some find it improbable that such a small and localised body of water could have lent its name to an entire nation. On the other hand, such naming is not unprecedented in world history.

Artūras Dubonis proposed another hypothesis, that Lietuva relates to the word leičiai (plural of leitis). From the middle of the 13th century, leičiai were a distinct warrior social group of the Lithuanian society subordinate to the Lithuanian ruler or the state itself. The word leičiai is used in 14–16th century historical sources as an ethnonym for Lithuanians (but not Samogitians) and is still used, usually poetically or in historical contexts, in the Latvian language, which is closely related to Lithuanian.

== History ==
=== Early history and Baltic tribes ===
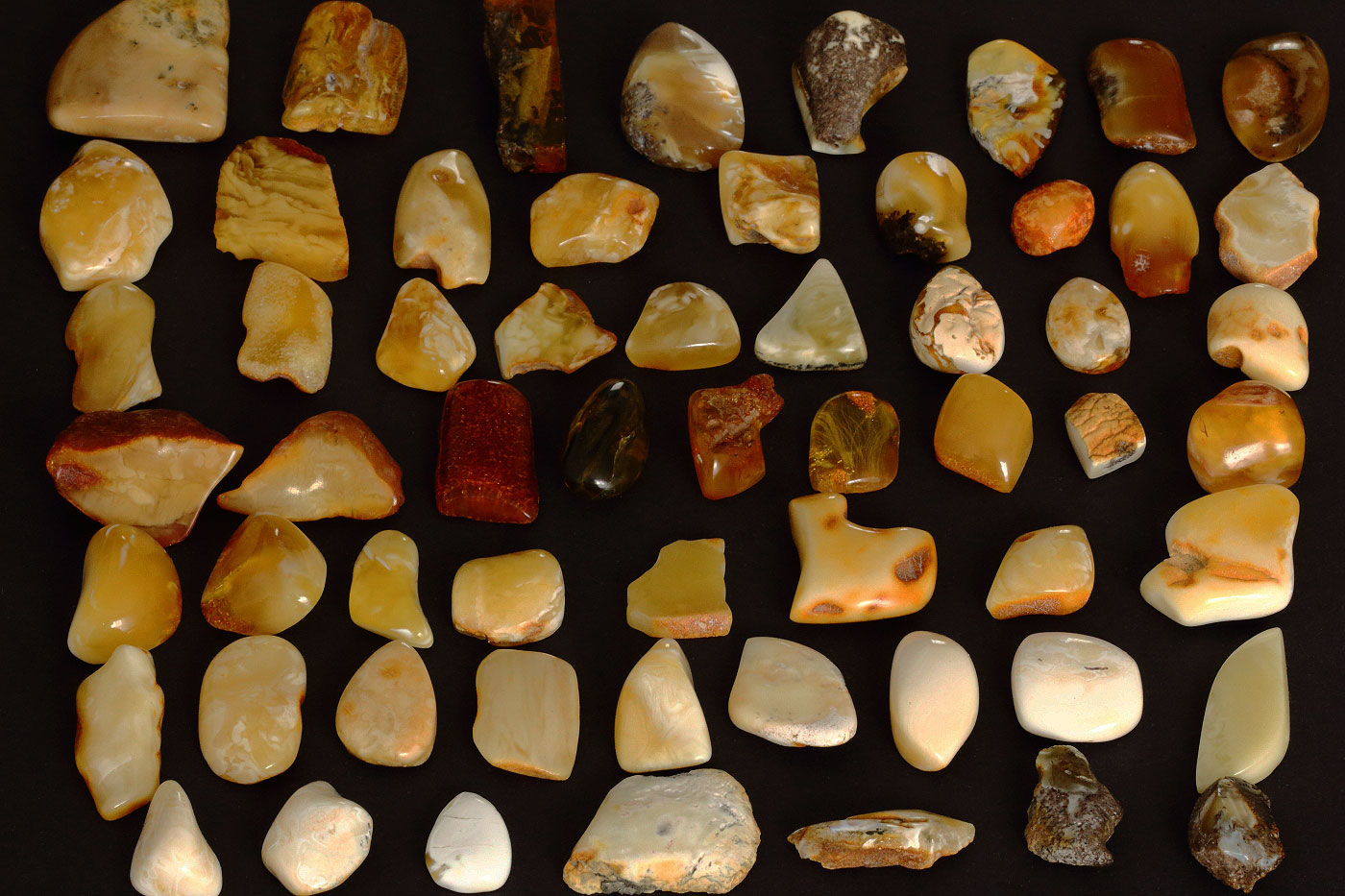
Baltic amber was a valuable trade item, transported from the region of modern-day Lithuania to the Roman Empire through the Amber Road.

The history of Lithuania dates back to settlements founded about 10,000 years ago. The first people settled in the territory of Lithuania after the Last Glacial Period in the 10th millennium BC: Kunda, Neman and Narva cultures. They were traveling hunters. In the 8th millennium BC the climate became warmer and forests developed. The inhabitants of what is now Lithuania travelled less and engaged in local hunting, gathering and fresh-water fishing. The Indo-Europeans, who arrived in the 3rd to 2nd millennium BC, mixed with the local population and formed various Baltic tribes. The Balts did not maintain close cultural or political contacts with the Roman Empire, while maintaining trade contacts via the Amber Road.

From the 9th to the 11th centuries, coastal Balts were subjected to raids by the Vikings. Lithuania comprised mainly the culturally different regions of Samogitia (known for its early medieval skeletal burials), and further east Aukštaitija, or Lithuania proper (known for its early medieval cremation burials). The area was remote and unattractive to outsiders, including traders, which accounts for its separate linguistic, cultural and religious identity and delayed integration into general European patterns and trends. Traditional Lithuanian pagan customs and mythology, with many archaic elements, were long preserved. Rulers' bodies were cremated up until the conversion to Christianity.

=== Kingdom of Lithuania, Grand Duchy of Lithuania and Polish–Lithuanian Commonwealth ===
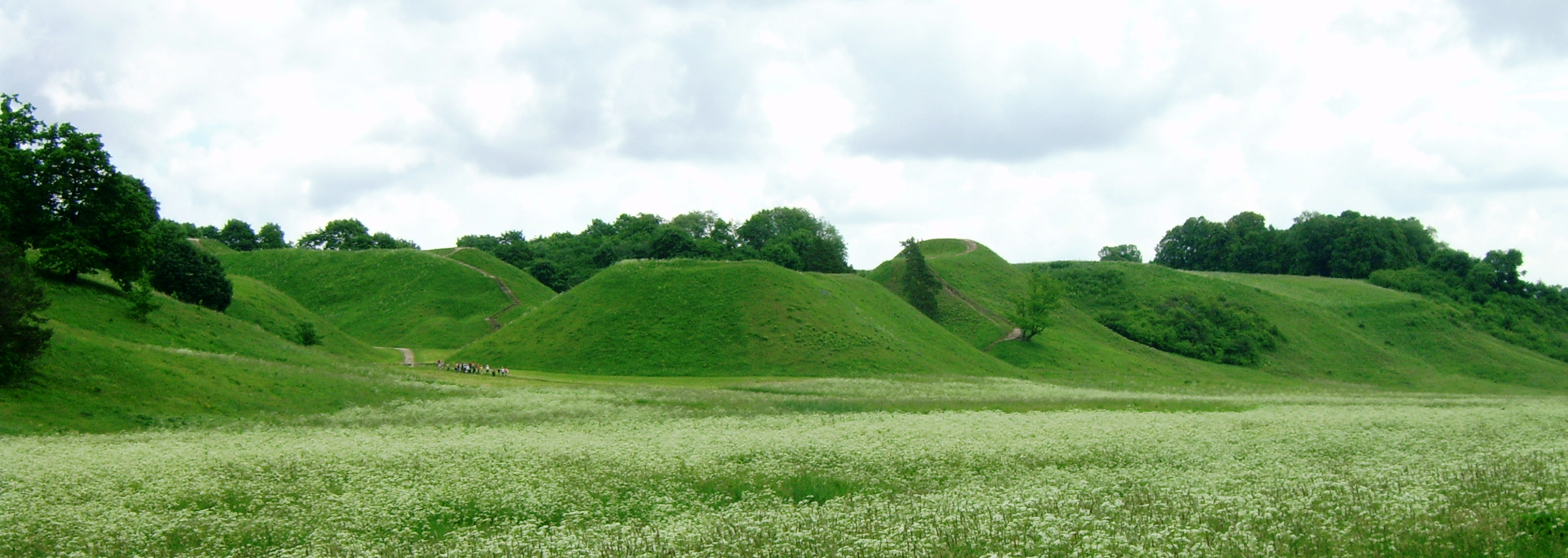
Ancient Kernavė hillforts

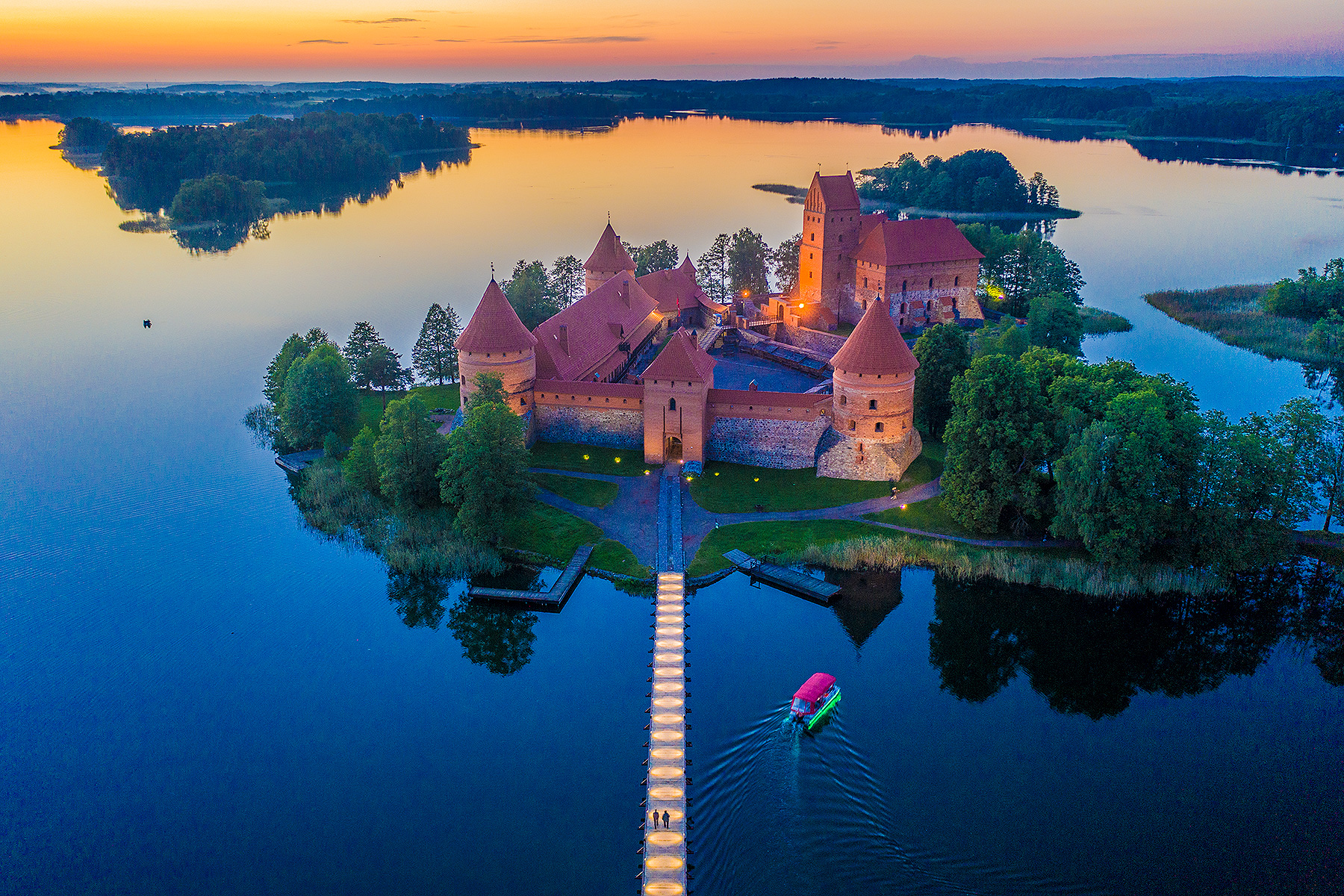
Trakai Island Castle, the former residence of the Grand Dukes of Lithuania. Nearby Senieji Trakai was the capital of the medieval state in 1316–1323, before the Lithuanian capital was transferred to Vilnius by the Lithuanian monarch Gediminas.

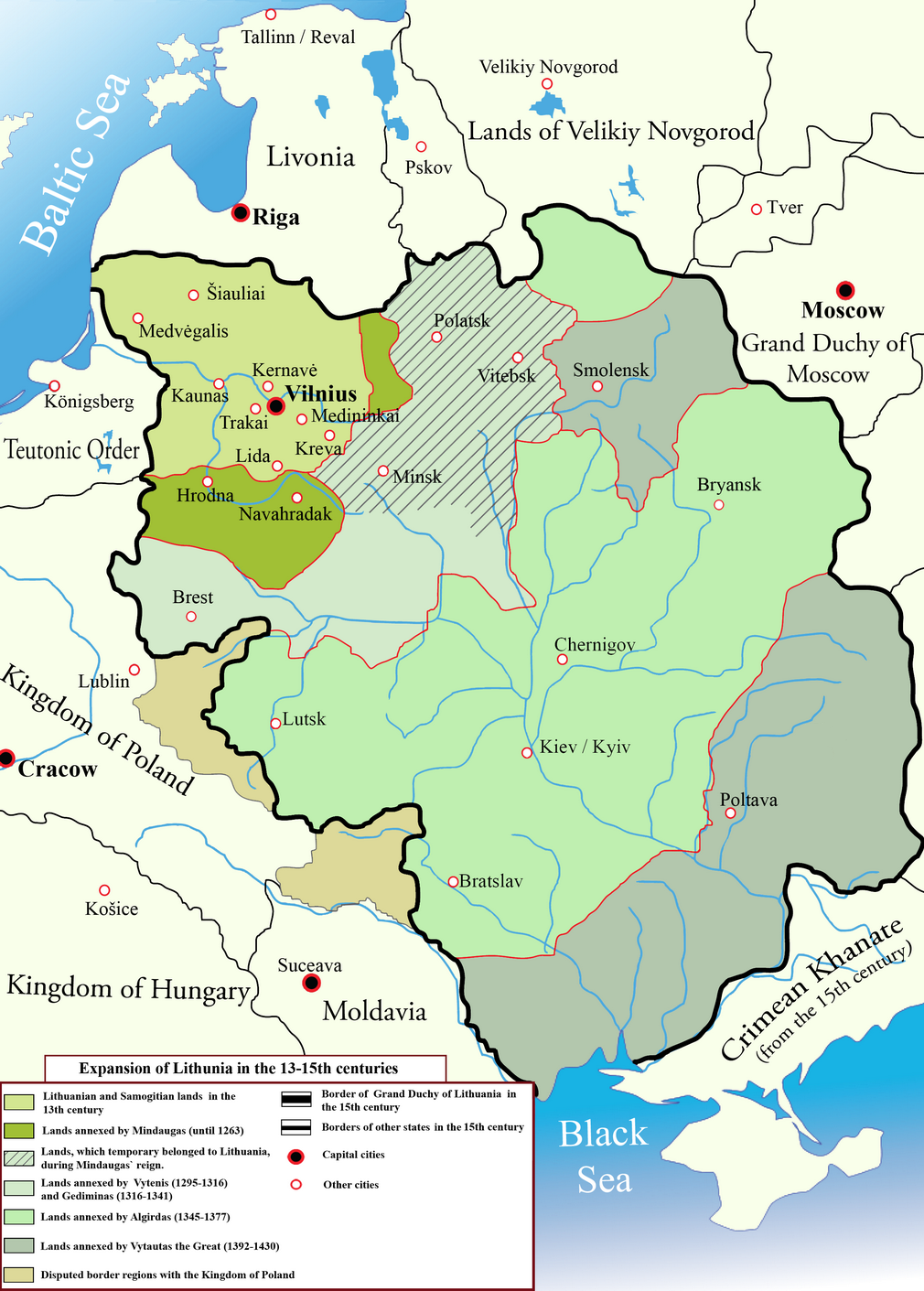
Changes in the territory of Lithuania from the 13th to 15th century. At its peak, Lithuania was the largest state in Europe.

The first written record of the name for the country dates to 1009 AD. Facing a German threat, Mindaugas in the middle of the 13th century united a large part of the Baltic tribes and founded the State of Lithuania; in 1253, he was crowned the Catholic King of Lithuania. Lithuanian statehood was created on the basis of Lithuania proper, where the Lithuanians tribe lived and spoke the Lithuanian language. Moreover, by taking advantage of the weakened territory of the former Kievan Rus' due to the Mongol invasion, Mindaugas incorporated Black Ruthenia into Lithuania. After Mindaugas' assassination in 1263, pagan Lithuania was again a target of the Christian crusades of the Teutonic Order and Livonian Order. Traidenis during his reign (1270–1282) reunified all Lithuanian lands and achieved military successes against the crusaders, fighting alongside other Baltic tribes, but was unable to militarily assist the Old Prussians in their Great Uprising. Traidenis' main residence was in Kernavė.

From the late 13th century, members of the Gediminids dynasty began ruling Lithuania. Grand Duke Gediminas consolidated a hereditary monarchy and established Vilnius as the capital city in his letters. Lithuania was Christianised and incorporated East Slavs' territories (e.g. principalities of Minsk, Kyiv, Polotsk, Vitebsk, Smolensk, etc.) significantly expanding the Grand Duchy of Lithuania's territory to ~650,000 km^{2} in the first half of the 14th century. At the end of the 14th century Lithuania was the largest country in Europe. In 1385, Lithuania formed a dynastic union with Poland through the Union of Krewo. By the 15th century patrilineal members of the Lithuanian ruling Gediminids dynasty ruled Lithuania and Poland, as well as Hungary, Croatia, Bohemia, and Moldavia. Wars with the Teutonic State in 1409–1411 and in 1422 concluded with the Treaty of Melno.

In the 15th century the strengthened Grand Duchy of Moscow renewed the Muscovite–Lithuanian Wars for Lithuanian-controlled Eastern Orthodox territories. Due to the unsuccessful beginning of the Livonian War, which resulted in loss of land to the Tsardom of Russia. Pressure by monarch Sigismund II Augustus (a supporter of a close Polish–Lithuanian union), the Lithuanian nobility agreed to conclude the Union of Lublin in 1569 with the Crown of the Kingdom of Poland, which created the Polish–Lithuanian Commonwealth with a joint monarch, with Lithuania remaining a separate state. After concluding the real union, Lithuania and Poland jointly managed to reach military successes during the Livonian War, occupation of Moscow (1610), war with Sweden (1600–1611), Smolensk war with Russia (1632–1634), etc. In 1588, Sigismund III Vasa personally confirmed the Third Statute of Lithuania where it stated that Lithuania and Poland have equal rights within the Commonwealth and ensured the separation of powers. The real union strongly intensified the Polonisation of Lithuania and Lithuanian nobility.

The mid-17th century was marked with disastrous military losses for Lithuania as during the Deluge most of the territory of Lithuania was annexed by the Tsardom of Russia, and Vilnius was captured for the first time by a foreign army and ravaged. In 1655, Lithuania unilaterally seceded from Poland, declared Swedish King Charles X Gustav as the Grand Duke of Lithuania and fell under the protection of the Swedish Empire. However, by 1657 Lithuania was once again a part of the Polish–Lithuanian Commonwealth following the Lithuanian revolt against the Swedes. Vilnius was recaptured from the Russians in 1661.

In the second half of the 18th century, the Polish–Lithuanian Commonwealth was partitioned three times by three neighbouring countries. This removed both independent Lithuania and Poland from the political map in 1795, following the failed Kościuszko Uprising and the short-lived recapture of Vilnius in 1794. Most of Lithuania's territory was annexed by the Russian Empire, while Užnemunė was annexed by Prussia.

=== Efforts to restore statehood ===
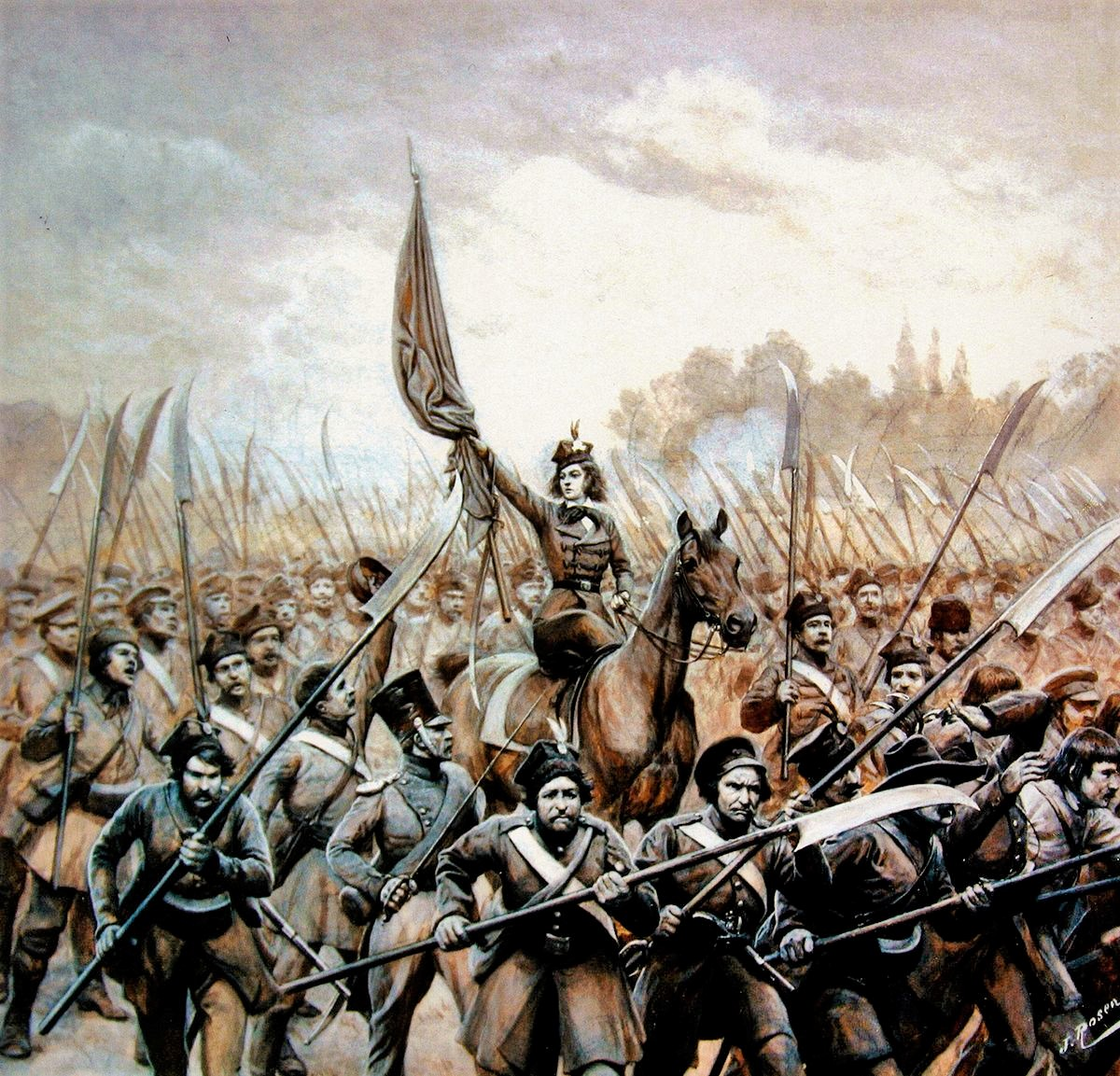
Emilia Plater leading peasant scythemen during the 1831 Uprising against the Russian Empire; often nicknamed as a Lithuanian Joan of Arc

Following the annexation the Russian Tsarist authorities implemented Russification policies in Lithuania, which then made a part of a new administrative region Northwestern Krai. In 1812 Napoleon during the French invasion of Russia established the puppet Lithuanian Provisional Governing Commission to support his war efforts. After Napoleon's defeat the Russian rule was reinstated in Lithuania.

During the November Uprising (1830–1831) the Lithuanians and Poles jointly attempted to restore their statehoods, however the Russian victory resulted in stricter Russification measures: the Russian language was introduced in all government institutions, Vilnius University was closed in 1832, and theories that Lithuania had been a "Western Russian" state since its establishment were propagated. Subsequently, the Lithuanians once again tried to restore statehood by participating in the January Uprising (1863–1864), but yet another Russian victory resulted in even stronger Russification policies with the introduction of the Lithuanian press ban, pressure on the Catholic Church in Lithuania and Mikhail Muravyov-Vilensky's repressions. Lithuanians resisted Russification through an extensive network of Lithuanian book smugglers, secret Lithuanian publishing and homeschooling. Moreover, the Lithuanian National Revival, inspired by Lithuanian history, language and culture, laid the foundations for the reestablishment of an independent Lithuania. The Great Seimas of Vilnius was held in 1905 and its participants adopted resolutions which demanded a wide autonomy for Lithuania.

=== Restored statehood and occupations ===
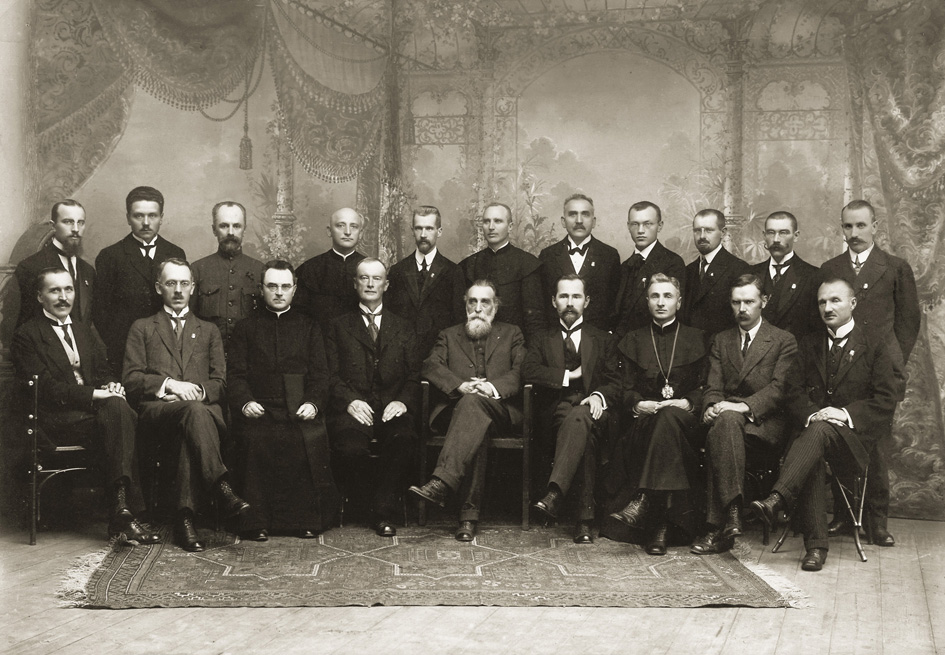
Members of the Council of Lithuania after signing the Act of Independence of Lithuania in the House of the Signatories in 1918

During World War I the German Empire annexed Lithuanian territories from the Russian Empire and they became a part of Ober Ost. In 1917, the Lithuanians organised the Vilnius Conference which adopted a resolution, featuring the aspiration for the restoration of Lithuania's sovereignty and military alliance with Germany and elected the Council of Lithuania. In 1918, the short-lived Kingdom of Lithuania was proclaimed; however on 16 February 1918 the Council of Lithuania adopted the Act of Independence of Lithuania which restored Lithuania as a democratic republic with its capital in Vilnius and without any political ties that existed with other nations in the past.

In 1918–1920 Lithuanians defended the statehood of Lithuania against Bolsheviks, Bermontians and Poles during the Lithuanian Wars of Independence. The Bolsheviks supported their puppet state Socialist Soviet Republic of Lithuania and Belorussia. The Lithuanian authorities prevented the 1919 Polish coup attempt in Lithuania. During the Spa Conference of 1920 the Polish prime minister Władysław Grabski, seeking for the Allies help against the Bolsheviks before the decisive Battle of Warsaw, signed an agreement by which Vilnius was given up to the Lithuanians and the Polish Army was to be retreated to the Curzon Line of 8 December 1919. However, the aims of the newly restored independent Lithuania clashed with the Polish chief of state Józef Piłsudski's plans to create a federation (Intermarium) in territories previously ruled by the Jagiellonians. Later in 1920 the Suwałki Agreement was concluded between Lithuania and Poland, however the next day the Żeligowski's Mutiny began with Piłsudski's backing and soon the Polish forces captured Vilnius Region, including capital city Vilnius, which was unsuccessfully defended by the heavily outnumbered Lithuanian Army soldiers, and established a puppet state of the Republic of Central Lithuania, which in 1922 was incorporated into Poland. Consequently, Kaunas became the temporary capital of Lithuania where the Constituent Assembly of Lithuania was held and other primary Lithuanian institutions operated until 1940. Nevertheless, Lithuania's independence and sovereignty were preserved in the Wars of Independence.

In 1923, the Klaipėda Revolt was organised which unified the Klaipėda Region with Lithuania. The 1926 Lithuanian coup d'état replaced the democratically elected government and president with an authoritarian regime led by Antanas Smetona.

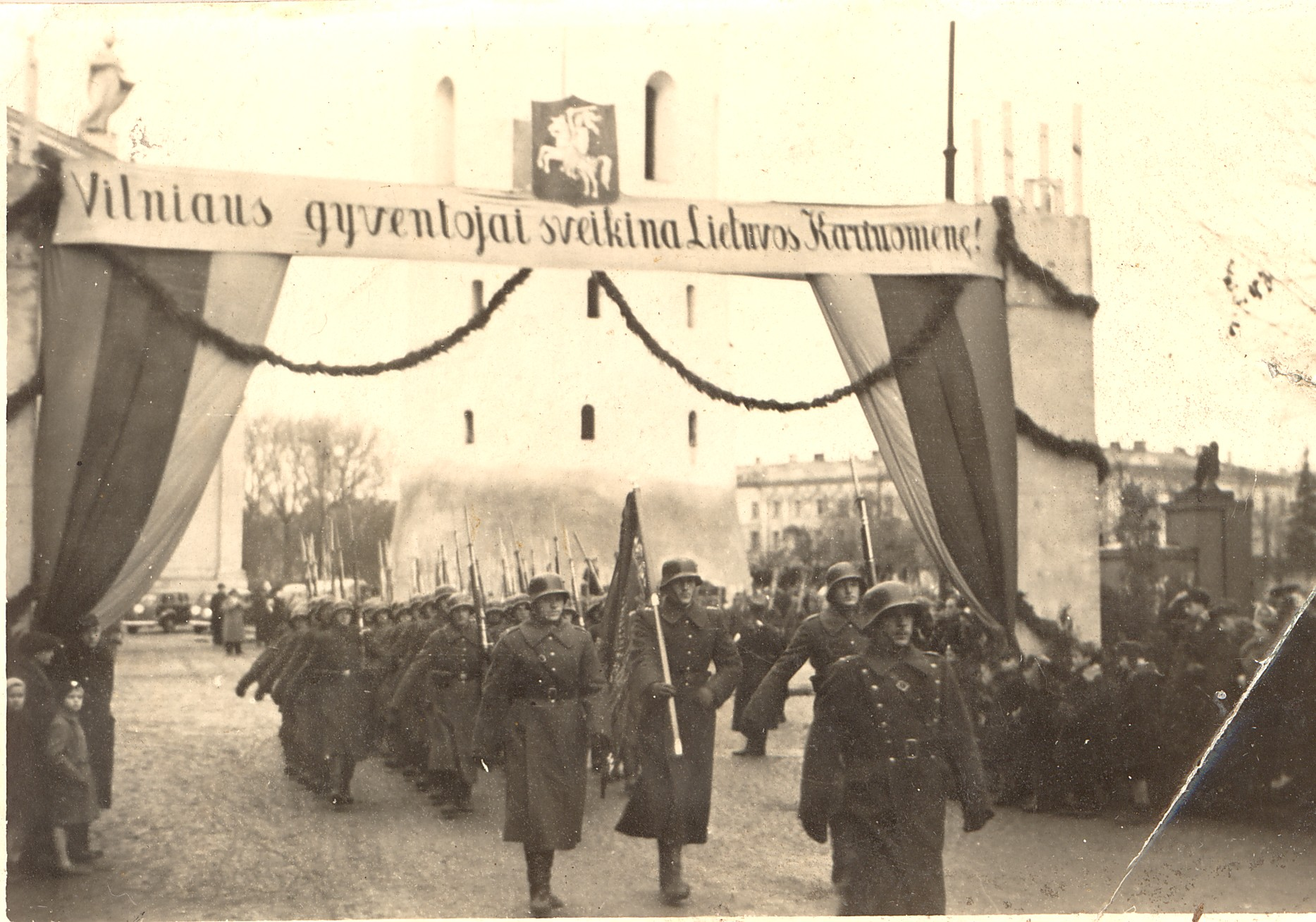
Lithuanian Armed Forces returning to Vilnius in 1939

In the late 1930s Lithuania accepted the 1938 Polish ultimatum, 1939 German ultimatum and transferred the Klaipėda Region to Nazi Germany. The 1939 Soviet–Lithuanian Mutual Assistance Treaty allowed the presence of Soviet troops in Lithuania. In 1940 Lithuania accepted the Soviet ultimatum and recovered the control of its historical capital Vilnius, however, the acceptance resulted in the Soviet occupation of Lithuania and its transformation into the Lithuanian Soviet Socialist Republic. In 1941 during the June Uprising in Lithuania it was attempted to restore independent Lithuania and the Red Army was expelled from its territory, however in a few days Lithuania was occupied by Nazi Germany. In 1944 Lithuania was re-occupied by the Soviet Union, and Soviet political repressions along with Soviet deportations from Lithuania resumed. Thousands of Lithuanian partisans and their supporters attempted to militarily restore independent Lithuania, but their resistance was eventually suppressed in 1953 by the Soviet authorities and their collaborators. Jonas Žemaitis, the chairman of the Union of Lithuanian Freedom Fighters, was captured and executed in 1954, his successor as chairman Adolfas Ramanauskas was brutally tortured and executed in 1957. Since the late 1980s Sąjūdis movement sought for the restoration of independent Lithuania, and in 1989 the Baltic Way was held.

=== Since 1990 ===
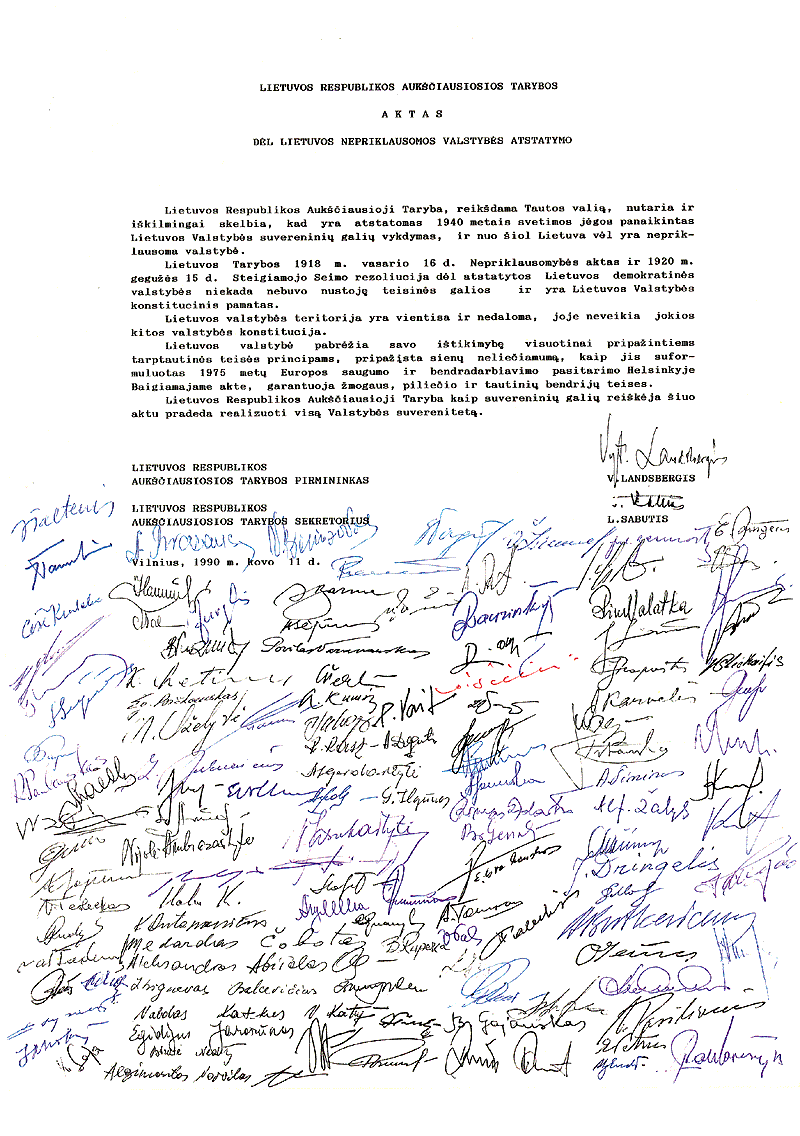
On 11 March 1990, the Supreme Council announced the restoration of Lithuania's independence. After refusal to revoke the Act, Soviet forces stormed the Seimas Palace while Lithuanians defended the democratically elected Council. The Act, the first such declaration in the USSR, later was a model and inspiration to other Soviet republics, and strongly influenced the dissolution of the Soviet Union.

On 11 March 1990, the Supreme Council announced the restoration of Lithuania's independence. Lithuania became the first Soviet-occupied state to announce the restitution of independence. On 20 April 1990, the Soviets imposed an economic blockade by ceasing to deliver raw materials to Lithuania. Domestic industry and the population started feeling the lack of fuel, essential goods, and even hot water. Although the blockade lasted for 74 days, Lithuania did not renounce its declaration of independence.

Gradually, economic relations were restored. However, tensions peaked again in January 1991. Attempts were made to carry out a coup d'état using the Soviet Armed Forces, the Internal Army of the Ministry of Internal Affairs and the USSR Committee for State Security (KGB). Because of the poor economic conditions in Lithuania, the authorities in Moscow believed the coup would receive strong public support. However, people flocked to Vilnius to defend the Supreme Council of the Republic of Lithuania and independence. The coup ended with limited material losses, though the Soviet Army killed 14 people and injured hundreds. A large part of the Lithuanian population participated in the January Events. On 31 July 1991, Soviet paramilitaries killed 7 Lithuanian border guards on the Soviet (Byelorussian SSR) border in what became known as the Medininkai Massacre. On 17 September, Lithuania was admitted to the United Nations.

On 25 October 1992, citizens voted in a referendum to adopt the current constitution. On 14 February 1993, during the direct general elections, Algirdas Brazauskas became the first president after the restoration of independence. On 31 August 1993 the last units of the Russian Army left Lithuania.

On 31 May 2001, Lithuania joined the World Trade Organization. Since March 2004, Lithuania has been part of NATO. On 1 May 2004, it became a full member of the European Union, and a member of the Schengen Agreement in December 2007. On 1 January 2015, Lithuania joined the eurozone and adopted the European Union's single currency. On 4 July 2018, Lithuania officially joined the OECD. On 24 February 2022, Lithuania declared a state of emergency in response to the 2022 Russian invasion of Ukraine. Together with seven other NATO member states, it invoked NATO Article 4 to hold consultations on security.

== Geography ==
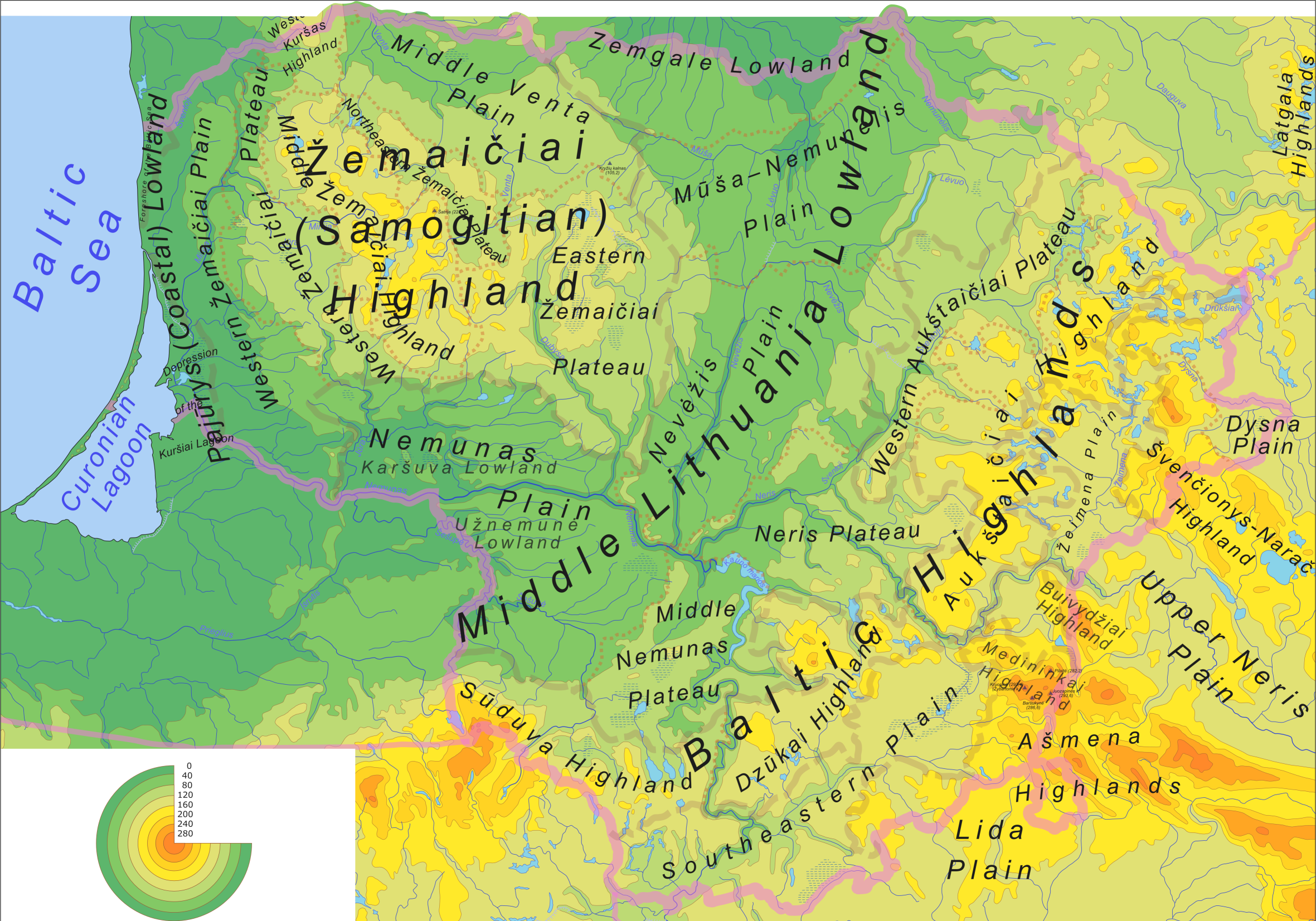
Physical map and geomorphological subdivision of Lithuania

Lithuania is located in the Baltic region of Europe and covers an area of 65,300 km^{2} (25,200 sq mi). It lies between latitudes 53° and 57° N, and mostly between longitudes 21° and 27° E (part of the Curonian Spit lies west of 21°). It has around 99 kilometres (61.5 mi) of sandy coastline, with around 38 kilometres (24 mi) facing the open Baltic Sea. The rest of the coast is sheltered by the Curonian sand peninsula. The warm-water port at Klaipėda lies at the narrow mouth of the Curonian Lagoon, a shallow lagoon extending south to Kaliningrad. The country's main and largest river, the Nemunas River, and some of its tributaries carry international shipping.

Lithuania lies at the edge of the North European Plain. Its landscape was smoothed by the glaciers of the last ice age, and is a combination of moderate lowlands and highlands. Its highest point is Aukštojas Hill at 294 metres (965 ft) in the eastern part of the country. The terrain features numerous lakes and wetlands, and a mixed forest zone covers over 33% of the country. Drūkšiai is the largest lake, Tauragnas is the deepest lake, and Asveja is the longest lake in Lithuania.

After a re-estimation of the boundaries of the European continent in 1989, Jean-George Affholder, a scientist at the Institut Géographique National (French National Geographic Institute), determined that the geographic centre of Europe was in Lithuania, at 54°54′N 25°19′E, 26 kilometres (16 mi) north of Vilnius. Affholder accomplished this by calculating the centre of gravity of the geometrical figure of Europe.

=== Climate ===
Lithuania has a temperate climate with both maritime and continental influences. It is defined as humid continental (Dfb) under the Köppen climate classification (but is close to oceanic in a narrow coastal zone).

Average temperatures on the coast are −2.5 °C (27.5 °F) in January and 16 °C (61 °F) in July. In Vilnius, the average temperatures are −6 °C (21 °F) in January and 17 °C (63 °F) in July. During the summer, 20 °C (68 °F) is common during the day, while 14 °C (57 °F) is common at night; in the past, temperatures have reached as high as 30 or 35 °C (86 or 95 °F). Some winters can be very cold. −20 °C (−4 °F) occurs almost every winter. Winter extremes are −34 °C (−29 °F) in coastal areas and −43 °C (−45 °F) in the east.

The average annual precipitation is 800 mm (31.5 in) on the coast, 900 mm (35.4 in) in the Samogitia highlands, and 600 mm (23.6 in) in the east. Snow occurs every year, and it can snow from October to April. In some years, sleet can fall in September or May. The growing season lasts 202 days in the western part of the country and 169 days in the eastern part. Severe storms are rare in the east but common in the coastal areas. Lithuania experienced a drought in 2002, causing forest and peat bog fires.

=== Biodiversity and conservation ===
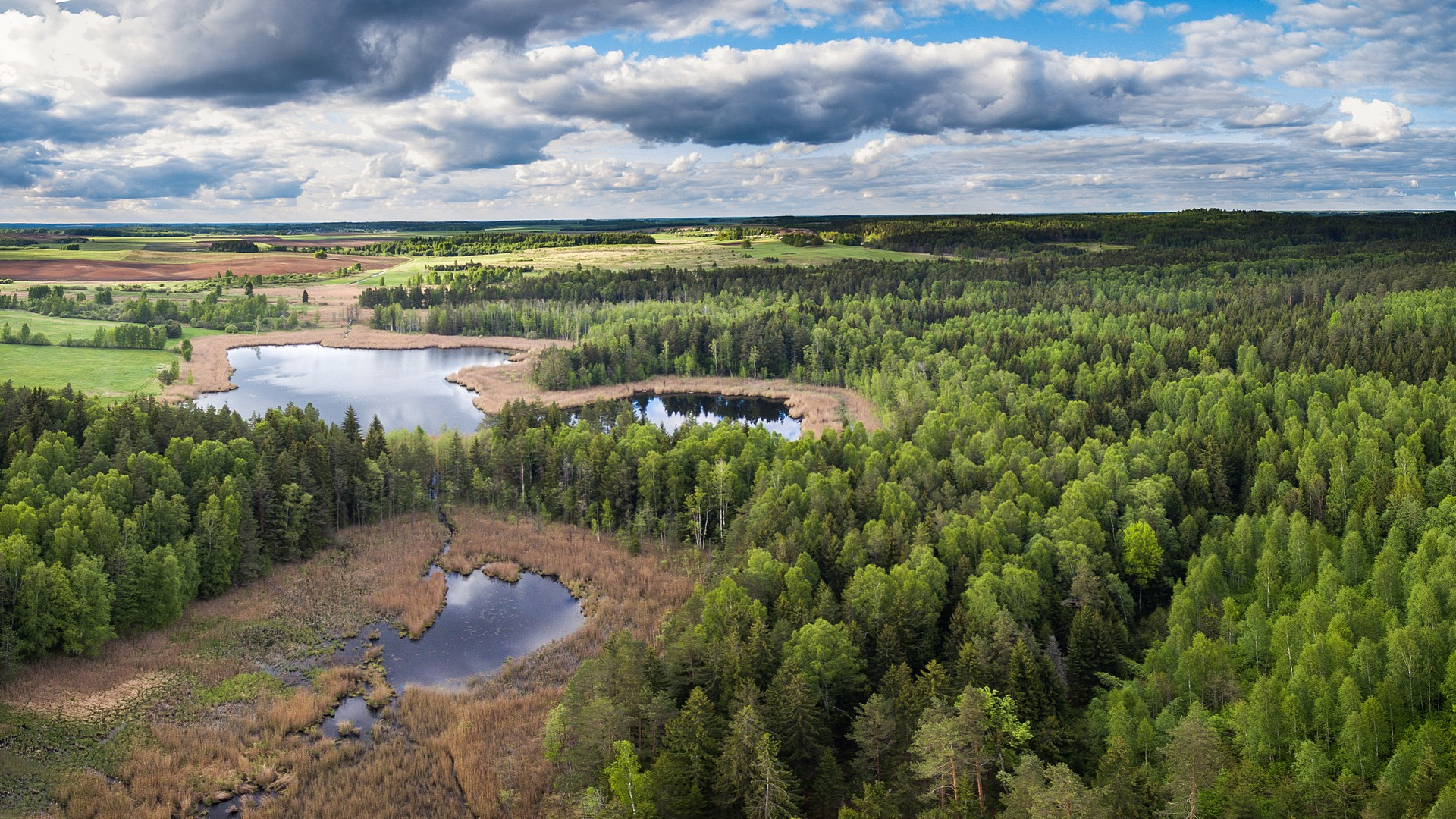
Lithuanian flatlands with lakes, swamps and forests. Lithuania has thousands of lakes.

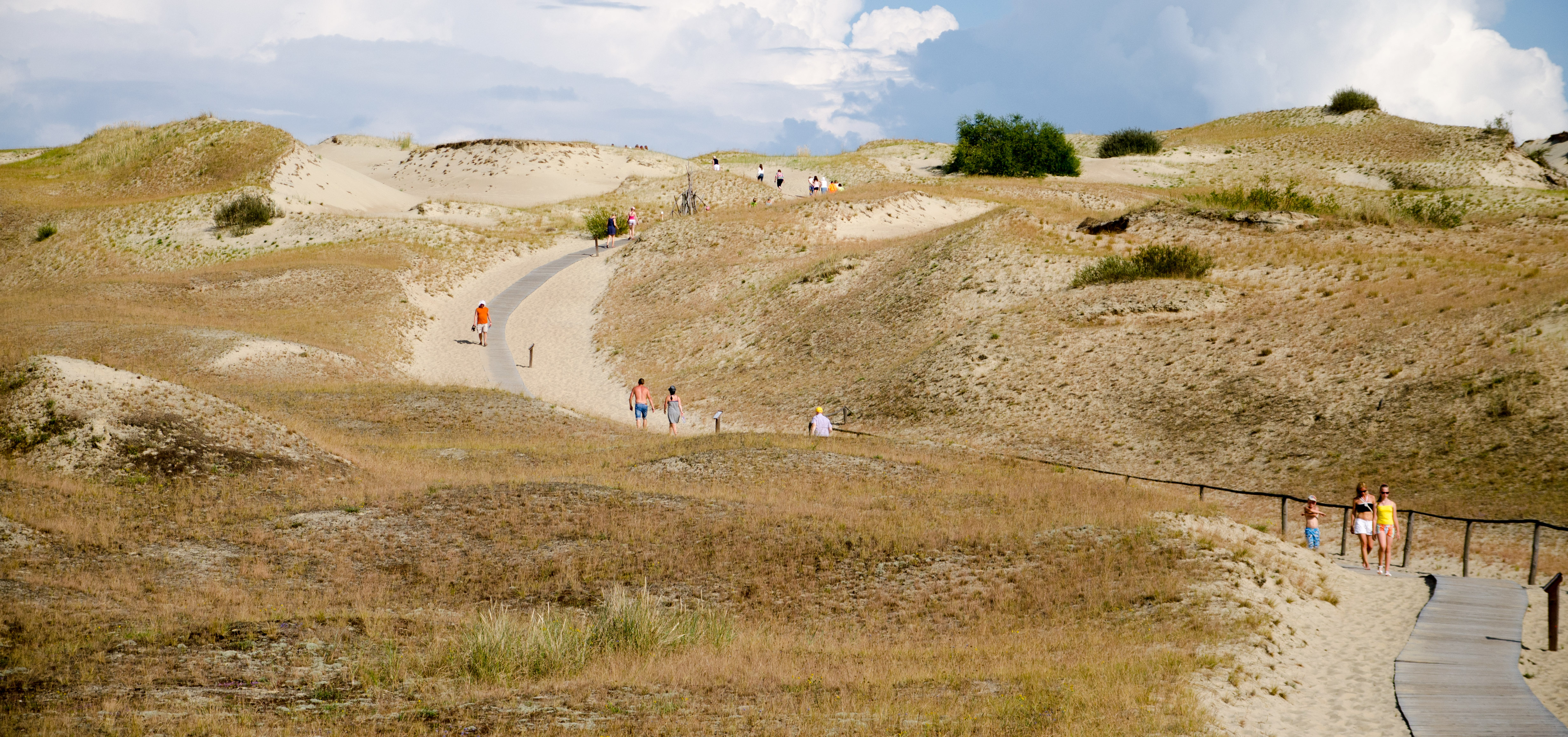
Sand dunes of the Curonian Spit near Nida, which are the highest drifting sand dunes in Europe (UNESCO World Heritage Site)

The Aplinkos apsaugos įstatymas (Environmental Protection Act) was adopted in 1992. The law provides the foundations for regulating social relations in the field of environmental protection, establishes the basic rights and obligations of legal and natural persons in preserving the biodiversity, ecological systems, and the landscape. Lithuania agreed to cut carbon emissions by at least 20% of 1990 levels by 2020 and by at least 40% by 2030, together with all European Union members. Also, by 2020 at least 20% (27% by 2030) of the country's total energy consumption should be from the renewable energy sources. In 2016, Lithuania introduced especially effective container deposit legislation, which resulted in collecting 92% of all packagings in 2017.

Lithuania does not have high mountains, and its landscape is dominated by blooming meadows, dense forests and fertile fields of cereals. However, it stands out by the abundance of hillforts, which previously had castles where the ancient Lithuanians burned altars for pagan gods. Lithuania is a particularly watered region with more than 3,000 lakes, mostly in the northeast. The country is also drained by numerous rivers, most notably the longest Nemunas. Lithuania is home to two terrestrial ecoregions: Central European mixed forests and Sarmatic mixed forests.

Forest has long been one of the most important natural resources. Forests occupy one-third of the territory, and timber-related industrial production accounts for almost 11% of industrial production. There are five national parks, 30 regional parks, 402 nature reserves, 6 strict nature reserves, and 668 state-protected natural heritage objects.

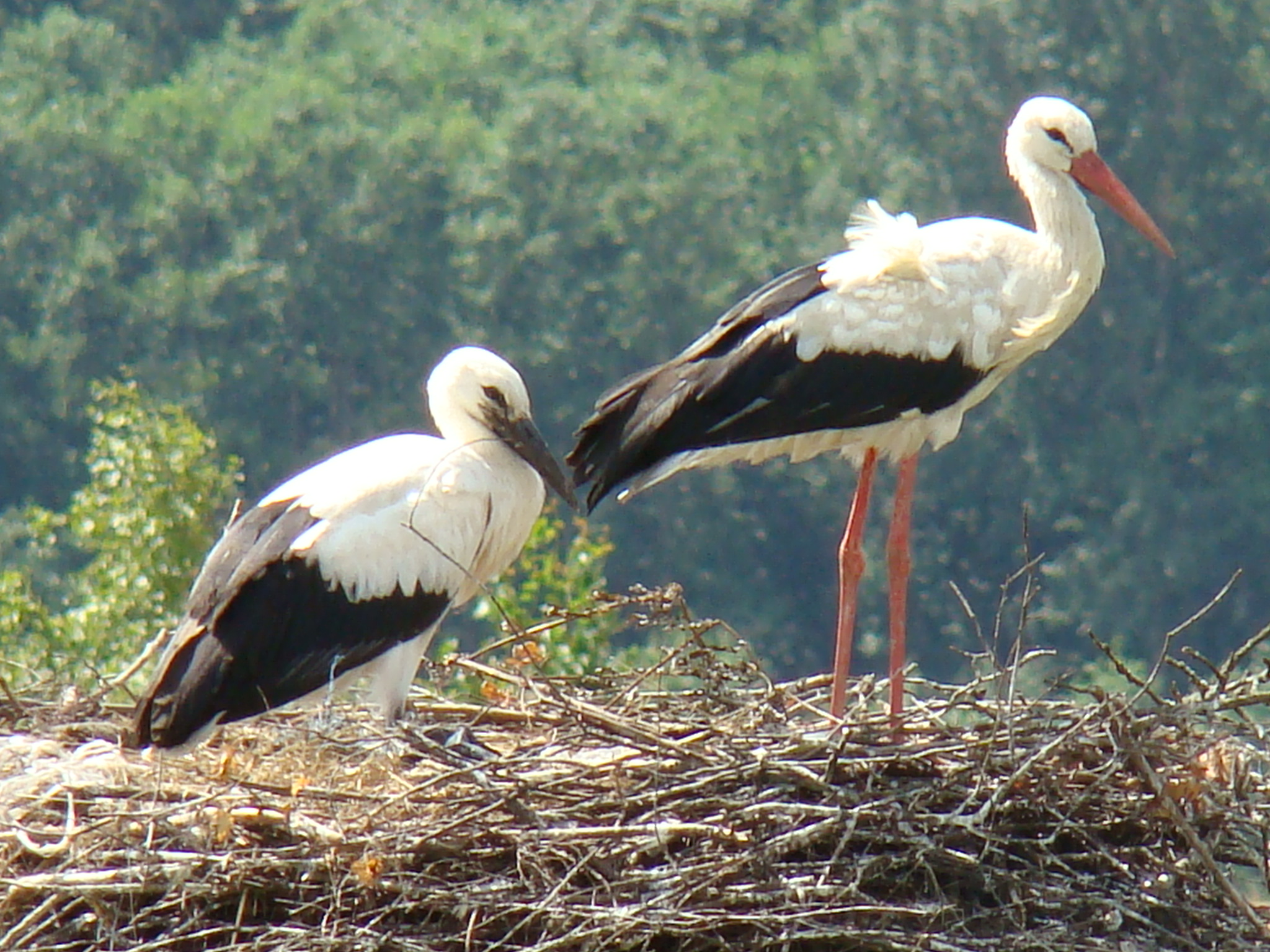
The white stork is the national bird of Lithuania, which has the highest-density stork population in Europe.

Ecosystems include natural and semi-natural (forests, bogs, wetlands and meadows) and anthropogenic (agrarian and urban) ecosystems. Among natural ecosystems, forests are particularly important, covering 33% of the country's territory. Wetlands (raised bogs, fens, transitional mires, etc.) cover 7.9% of the country, with 70% of wetlands having been lost due to drainage and peat extraction between 1960 and 1980. Changes in wetland plant communities resulted in the replacement of moss and grass communities by trees and shrubs, and fens not directly affected by land reclamation have become drier as a result of a drop in the water table. There are 29,000 rivers with a total length of 64,000 km; the Nemunas River basin occupies 74% of the territory of the country. Due to the construction of dams, approximately 70% of spawning sites of potential catadromous fish species have disappeared. In some cases, river and lake ecosystems continue to be impacted by anthropogenic eutrophication.

Agricultural land comprises 54% of Lithuania's territory (roughly 70% of that is arable land and 30% meadows and pastures), approximately 400,000 ha of agricultural land is not farmed and acts as an ecological niche for weeds and invasive plant species. Habitat deterioration is occurring in regions with very productive and expensive lands as crop areas are expanded. About 18.9% of all plant species, including 1.87% of all known fungi species and 31% of all known species of lichens, are listed in the Lithuanian Red Data Book. The list also contains 8% of all fish species.

The wildlife populations have rebounded as hunting became more restricted and urbanisation allowed replanting forests (forests already tripled in size since their lows). Lithuania has approximately 250,000 larger wild animals or 5 per square kilometre. The most prolific large wild animal is the roe deer, with 120,000 of them. They are followed by boars (55,000). Other ungulates are the red deer (~22,000), fallow deer (~21,000) and the largest one: moose (~7,000). Among the predators, foxes are the most common (~27,000). Wolves, which are ingrained in local mythology more than in reality, number only about 800 in Lithuania. Even rarer are lynxes (~200). There are about 200,000 rabbits living throughout the country's forests.

== Government and politics ==
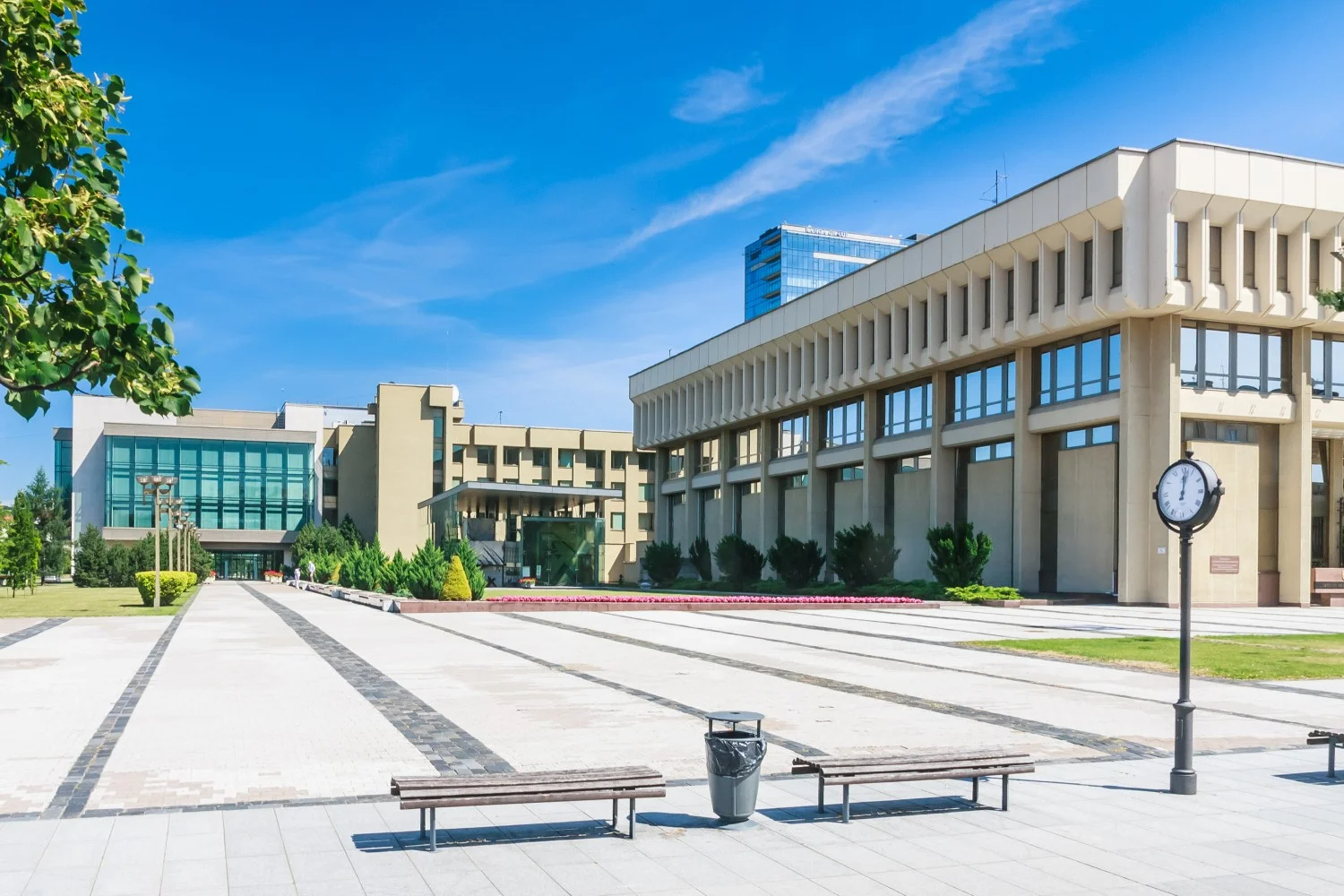
Seimas, Parliament of Lithuania

=== Government ===
Since Lithuania declared the restoration of its independence on 11 March 1990, it has maintained strong democratic traditions. It held its first independent general elections on 25 October 1992, in which 56.75% of voters supported the new constitution. There were intense debates concerning the constitution, particularly the role of the president. A separate referendum was held on 23 May 1992 to gauge public opinion on the matter, and 41% of voters supported the restoration of the President of Lithuania. Through compromise, a semi-presidential system was agreed on.

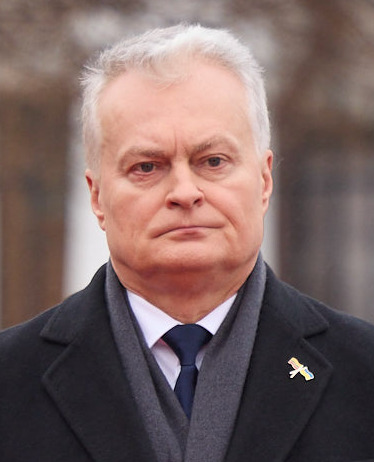
Gitanas Nausėda
President

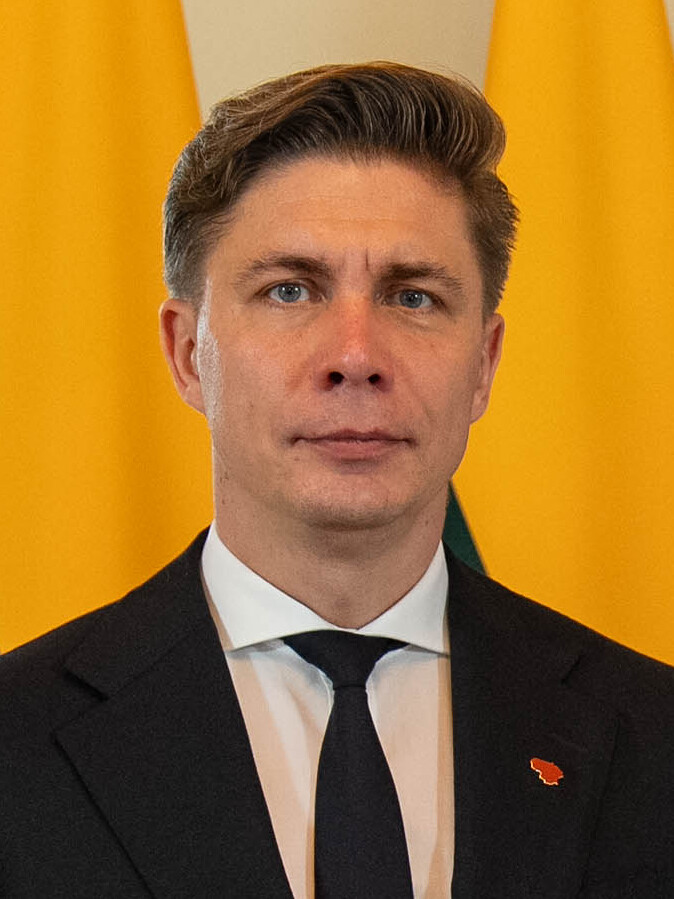
Mindaugas Sinkevičius
Prime Minister

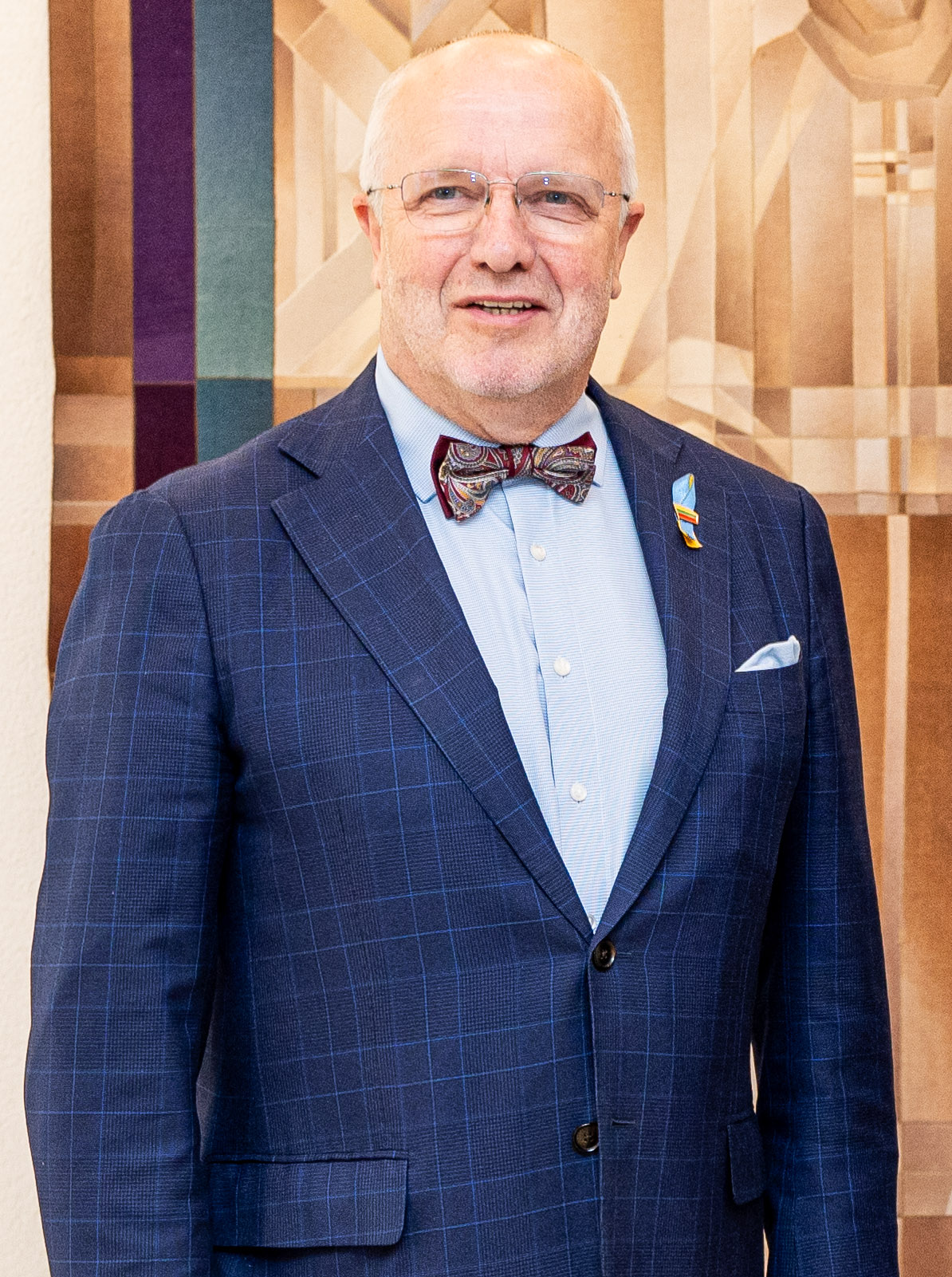
Juozas Olekas
Speaker of the Seimas

The Lithuanian head of state is the president, directly elected for a five-year term and serving a maximum of two terms. The president oversees foreign affairs and national security and is the commander-in-chief of the military. The president appoints the prime minister and the cabinet, as well as other top civil servants and the judges for all courts except the Constitutional Court. President Gitanas Nausėda was elected on 26 May 2019 by winning in all the municipalities of Lithuania in the second election round. He was re-elected in 2024, winning more than 74% of the run-off votes.

The judges of the Constitutional Court (Konstitucinis Teismas) serve nine-year terms. One-third of the court members is renewed every three years. The judges are appointed by the Seimas on the nomination by the president, chairman of the Seimas, and the chairman of the Supreme Court. The unicameral Lithuanian parliament, the Seimas, has 141 members elected to four-year terms: 71 in single-member constituencies, and the others in a nationwide vote by proportional representation. A party must receive at least 5% of the national vote to be eligible for any of the 70 national seats in the Seimas.

According to International IDEA's Global State of Democracy (GSoD) Indices and Democracy Tracker, Lithuania performs in the mid to high range on overall democratic measures, with particular weaknesses in civic engagement and electoral participation.

=== Political parties and elections ===
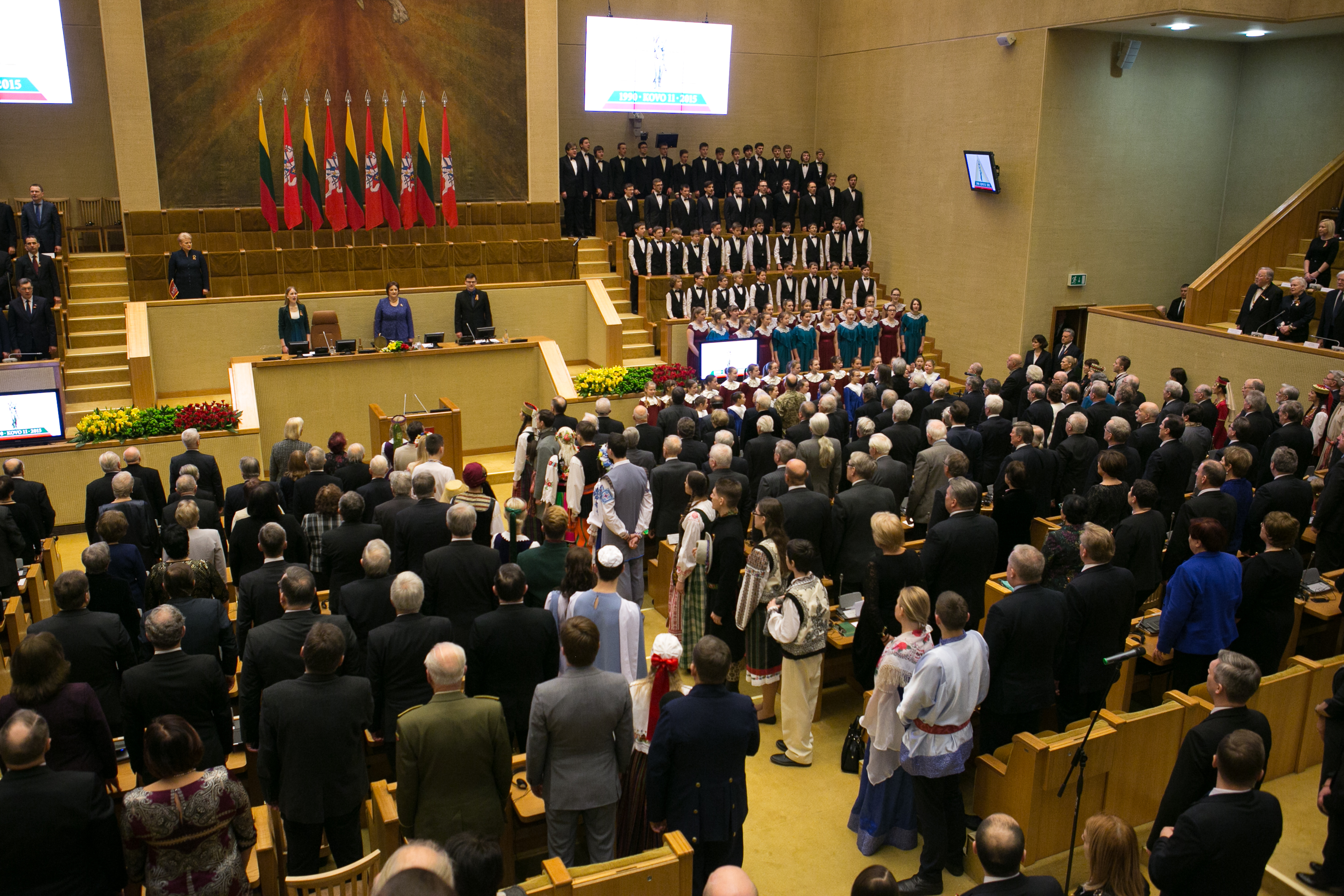
Commemoration of the Act of the Re-Establishment of the State of Lithuania in the historical Seimas hall where it was originally signed in 1990. The ceremony is attended by the Lithuanian President, Prime Minister, Chairman of the Seimas and other high-ranking officials.

Lithuania exhibits a fragmented multi-party system, with many small parties in which coalition governments are common. Elections for president take place on the last Sunday no more than two months before the end of current presidential term. Ordinary elections to the Seimas take place on the second Sunday of October every four years. The Social Democratic Party of Lithuania won the 2024 Lithuanian parliamentary elections and gained 52 of 141 seats in the parliament. In November 2024, Gintautas Paluckas was confirmed as the prime minister after the Social Democrats reached a coalition agreement with Union of Democrats "For Lithuania" and Dawn of Nemunas. Lithuania was one of the first countries in the world to grant women a right to vote in the elections. Women were allowed to vote by the 1918 Constitution of Lithuania and used their newly granted right for the first time in 1919.

Each municipality is governed by a municipal council and a mayor, who is a member of the municipal council. The number of members, elected on a four-year term, in each municipal council depends on the size of the municipality and varies from 15 (in municipalities with fewer than 5,000 residents) to 51 (in municipalities with more than 500,000 residents). Members of the council, with the exception of the mayor, are elected using proportional representation. Starting with 2015, the mayor is elected directly by the majority of residents of the municipality. The Social Democratic Party of Lithuania won the most positions in the 2023 elections (358 municipal council seats and 17 mayors).

As of 2024, the number of seats in the European Parliament allocated to Lithuania was 11. Ordinary elections take place on a Sunday on the same day as in other EU countries. Eight political parties gained seats in the 2024 elections.

=== Law and law enforcement ===
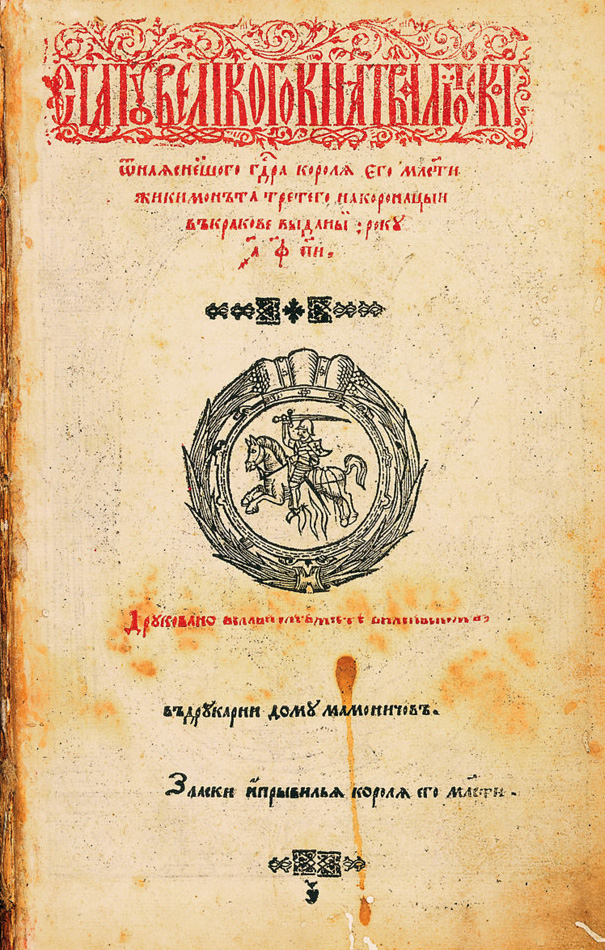
Statutes of Lithuania were the central piece of Lithuanian law in 1529–1795.

The first attempt to codify the Lithuanian laws was in 1468 when the Casimir's Code was compiled and adopted by Grand Duke Casimir IV Jagiellon. In the 16th century three editions of the Statutes of Lithuania were created with the First Statute being adopted in 1529, the Second Statute in 1566, and the Third Statute in 1588. On 3 May 1791, the Europe's first and the world's second constitution was adopted by the Great Sejm. The Third Statute was partly in force in the territory of Lithuania even until 1840, despite the Third Partition of the Polish–Lithuanian Commonwealth in 1795. Internal state acts, international correspondence and resolutions of the Sejm of the Polish–Lithuanian Commonwealth had to be confirmed with the Great Seal of Lithuania or the Lesser Seal of Lithuania to come into force in Lithuania until 1795.

In 1934–1935, Lithuania held the first mass trial of the Nazis in Europe; the convicted were sentenced to imprisonment in a heavy labor prison and capital punishments.

After regaining of independence in 1990, the largely modified Soviet legal codes were in force for about a decade. The current Constitution of Lithuania was adopted on 25 October 1992. In 2001, the Civil Code of Lithuania was passed in Seimas. It was succeeded by the Criminal Code and Criminal Procedure Code in 2003. The approach to the criminal law is inquisitorial, as opposed to adversarial; it is generally characterised by an insistence on formality and rationalisation, as opposed to practicality and informality. Normative legal act enters into force on the next day after its publication in the Teisės aktų registras, unless it has a later entry into force date. The European Union law is an integral part of the Lithuanian legal system since 1 May 2004.

After breaking away from the Soviet Union, Lithuania had a difficult crime situation, however, the law enforcement agencies fought crime over the years, making Lithuania a reasonably safe country. Crime in Lithuania has been declining rapidly. Law enforcement is primarily the responsibility of local Lithuanian Police commissariats. They are supplemented by the Anti-Terrorist Operations Team of the Lithuanian Police Aras (Lithuanian Criminal Police Bureau, Lithuanian Police Forensic Research Center and Lithuanian Road Police Service.

In 2017, there were 63,846 crimes registered in Lithuania. Of these, thefts comprised a large part with 19,630 cases (13.2% less than in 2016). While 2,835 crimes were serious and very serious (crimes that may lead to more than six years imprisonment), which is 14.5% less than in 2016. In total, 129 homicides or attempted homicide occurred (19.9% less than in 2016), while serious bodily harm was registered 178 times (17.6% less than in 2016). Another problematic crime contraband cases also decreased by 27.2% from 2016. Meanwhile, crimes in electronic data and information technology security fields increased by 26.6%. In the 2024 Special Eurobarometer, 24% of Lithuanians said that corruption affects their daily lives (EU average 27%). Moreover, 83% of Lithuanians regarded corruption as widespread in their country (EU average 68%), and 78% agreed that bribery and the use of connections is often the easiest way of obtaining certain public services (EU average 63%).

Capital punishment in Lithuania was suspended in 1996 and eliminated in 1998. Imprisonment rate in Lithuania is among the highest in the EU, although it has decreased by nearly half between 2013 and 2023. According to scientist Gintautas Sakalauskas, the high imprisonment rate is not because of a high criminality rate in the country, but due to Lithuania's high repression level and mistrust in the society.

=== Administrative divisions ===
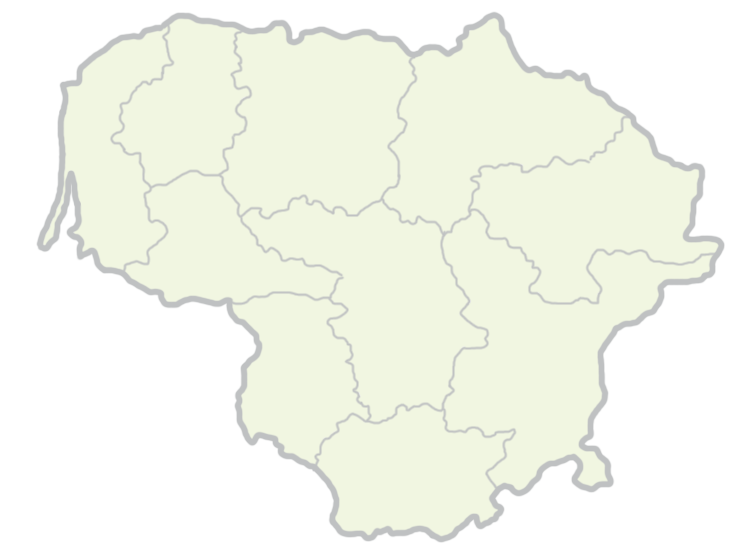

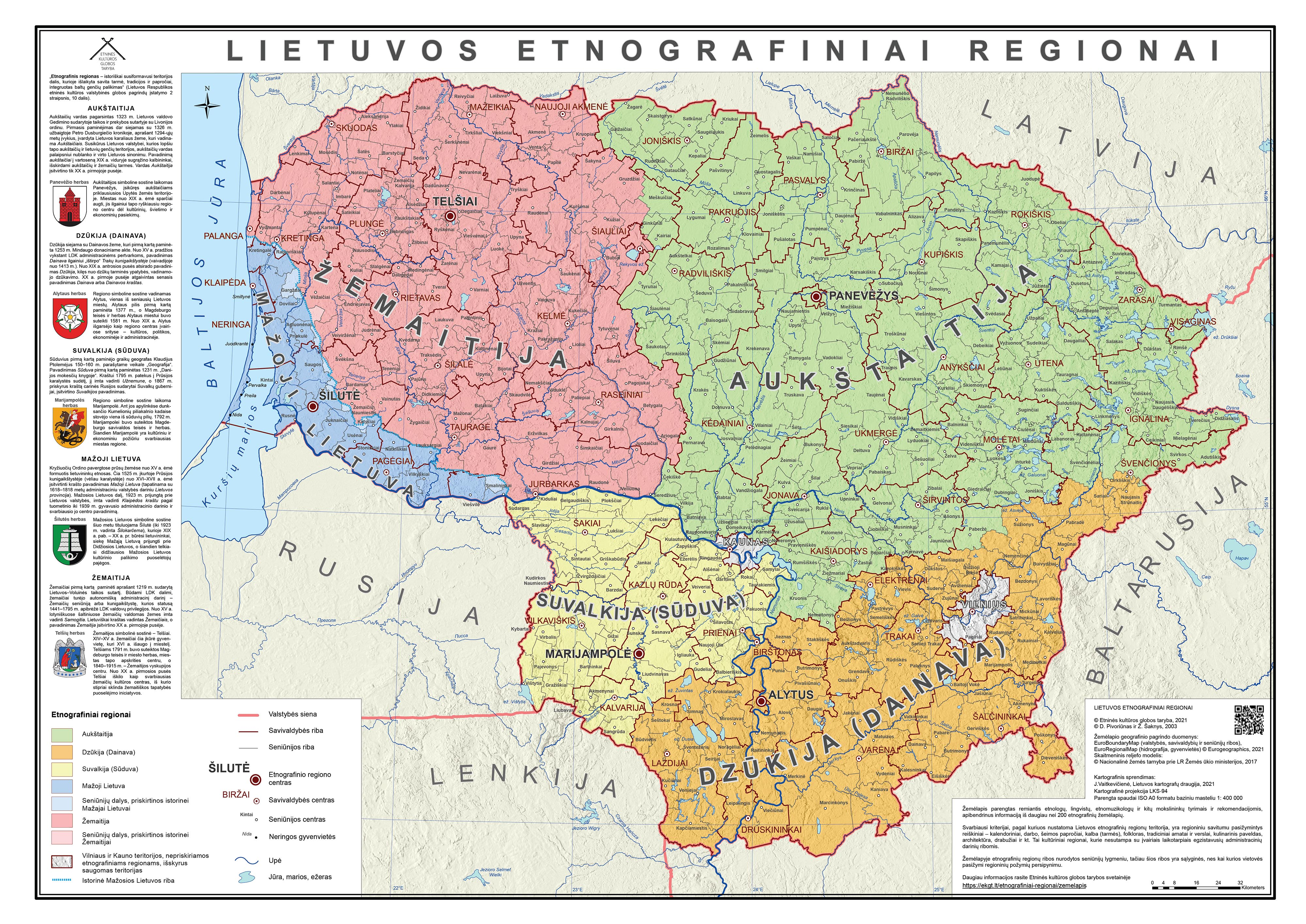
Cultural regions of Lithuania divided by municipalities and elderships: Lithuania Minor (Mažoji Lietuva) Samogitia (Žemaitija) Highland (Aukštaitija) Dainava (Dzūkija) Sudovia (Suvalkija)

The current system of administrative division was established in 1994 and modified in 2000 to meet the requirements of the European Union. The country's 10 counties are subdivided into 60 municipalities, and further divided into 546 elderships. There are also 5 distinct cultural regions – Dzūkija, Aukštaitija, Suvalkija, Samogitia and Lithuania Minor.

Municipalities have been the most important unit of administration since the system of county governorship was dissolved in 2010. Some municipalities are historically called "district municipalities" (often shortened to "district"), while others are called "city municipalities" (sometimes shortened to "city"). Each has its own elected government. The election of municipality councils originally occurred every three years, but now takes place every four years. The council appoints elders to govern the elderships. Mayors have been directly elected since 2015; prior to that, they were appointed by the council.

Elderships are the smallest administrative units and do not play a role in national politics. They provide necessary local public services—for example, registering births and deaths in rural areas. They are most active in the social sector, identifying needy individuals or families and organising and distributing welfare and other forms of relief. Some citizens feel that elderships have no real power and receive too little attention, and that they could otherwise become a source of local initiative for addressing rural problems.

County	Area (km^{2})	Population (2023)	GDP (billion EUR)	GDP per capita (EUR)
Alytus County	5,425	135,367	1.8	13,600
Kaunas County	8,089	580,333	13.7	23,900
Klaipėda County	5,209	336,104	7.0	21,300
Marijampolė County	4,463	135,891	2.0	14,400
Panevėžys County	7,881	211,652	3.6	17,100
Šiauliai County	8,540	261,764	4.6	17,600
Tauragė County	4,411	90,652	1.2	13,200
Telšiai County	4,350	131,431	2.2	16,900
Utena County	7,201	125,462	1.7	13,800
Vilnius County	9,731	851,346	29.4	35,300
Lithuania	65,300	2,860,002	67.4	23,800

=== Foreign relations ===
Lithuania is a member of the European Union

Lithuania became a member of the United Nations on 18 September 1991, and is a signatory to a number of its organisations and other international agreements. It is also a member of the European Union, the Council of Europe, OSCE, as well as NATO and its adjunct North Atlantic Coordinating Council. Lithuania gained membership in the World Trade Organization on 31 May 2001, and joined the OECD on 5 July 2018, while also seeking membership in other Western organisations. Lithuania has established diplomatic relations with 149 countries. During the second half of 2013, Lithuania assumed the role of the presidency of the European Union. Lithuania is active in developing cooperation among northern European countries. It is a member of the interparliamentary Baltic Assembly, the intergovernmental Baltic Council of Ministers and the Council of the Baltic Sea States.

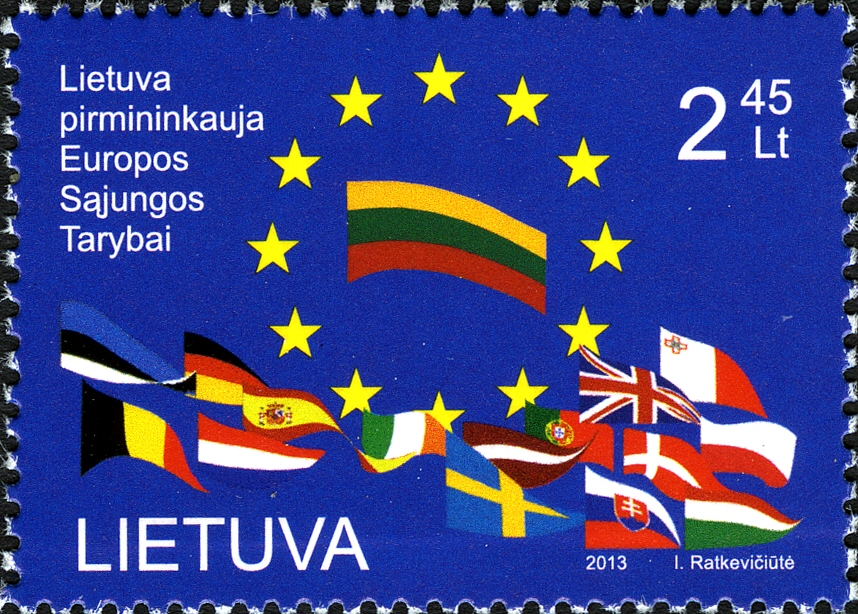
Stamp dedicated to Lithuania's presidency of the European Union

Lithuania cooperates with Nordic and the two other Baltic countries through the Nordic-Baltic Eight format. A similar format, NB6, unites Nordic and Baltic members of EU. NB6's focus is to discuss and agree on positions before presenting them to the Council of the European Union and at the meetings of EU foreign affairs ministers. The Council of the Baltic Sea States (CBSS) was established in Copenhagen in 1992 as an informal regional political forum. Its main aim is to promote integration and to close contacts between the region's countries. The members of CBSS are Iceland, Sweden, Denmark, Norway, Finland, Germany, Lithuania, Latvia, Estonia, Poland, Russia, and the European Commission. Its observer states are Belarus, France, Italy, Netherlands, Romania, Slovakia, Spain, the United States, the United Kingdom, and Ukraine.

The Nordic Council of Ministers and Lithuania engage in political cooperation to attain mutual goals and to determine new trends and possibilities for joint cooperation. The council's information office aims to disseminate Nordic concepts and to demonstrate and promote Nordic cooperation. Together with the five Nordic countries and the two other Baltic countries, it is a member of the Nordic Investment Bank (NIB) and cooperates in its NORDPLUS programme, which is committed to education.

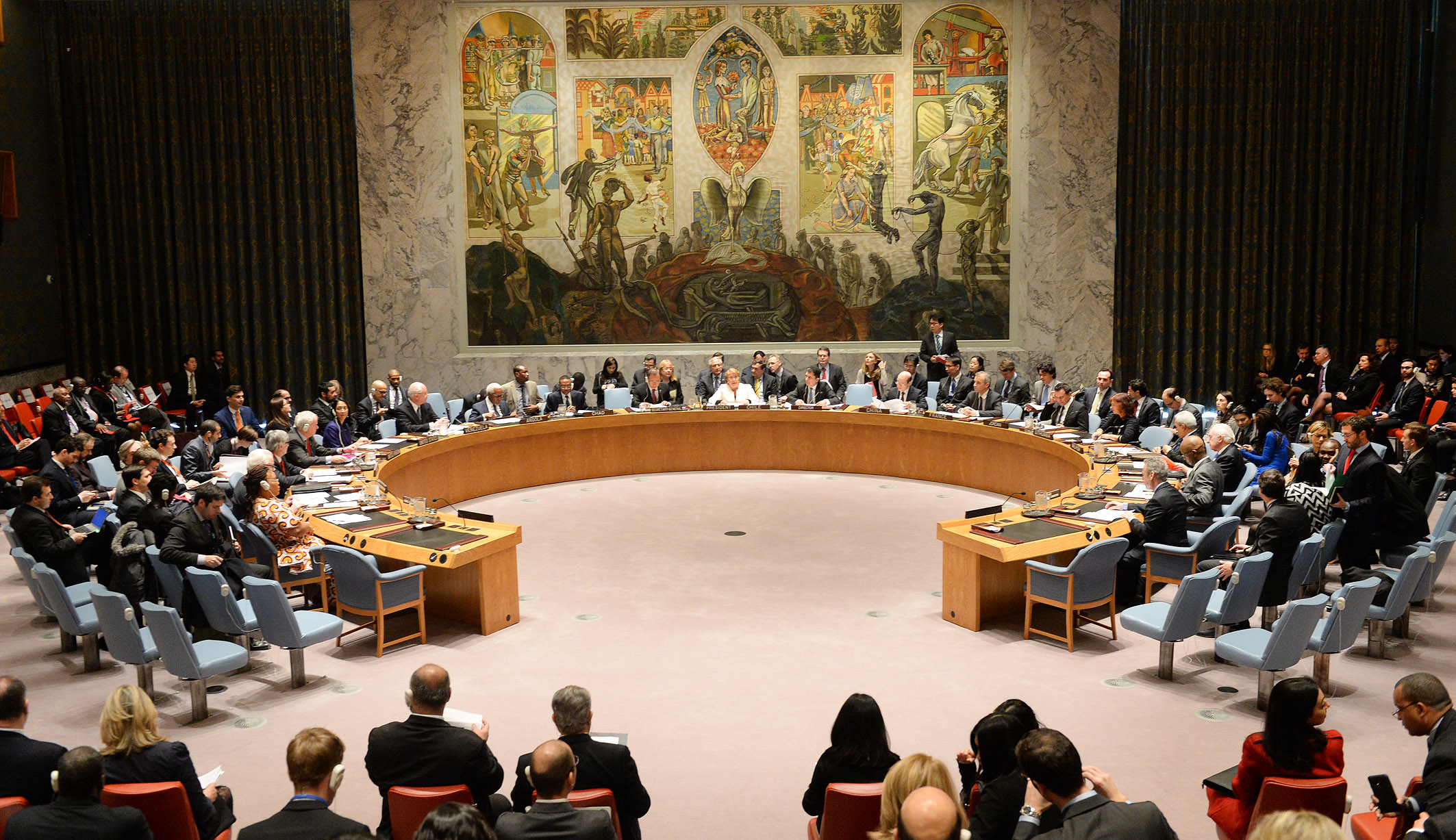
Lithuania was a member of the United Nations Security Council. Its representatives are on the right side.

Poland was highly supportive of Lithuanian independence, despite the discriminatory treatment of its Polish minority. The former Solidarity leader and Polish President Lech Wałęsa criticised the government of Lithuania over discrimination against the Polish minority and rejected the Order of Vytautas the Great. Lithuania maintains warm relations with Georgia and strongly supports its European Union and NATO aspirations. During the Russo-Georgian War in 2008, when the Russian troops were occupying the territory of Georgia and approaching towards the Georgian capital Tbilisi, President Valdas Adamkus, together with the Polish and Ukrainian presidents, went to Tbilisi by answering to the Georgians request of the international assistance. Shortly, Lithuanians and the Lithuanian Catholic Church also began collecting financial support for the war victims.

In 2004–2009, Dalia Grybauskaitė served as European Commissioner for Financial Programming and the Budget within the José Manuel Barroso-led Commission.

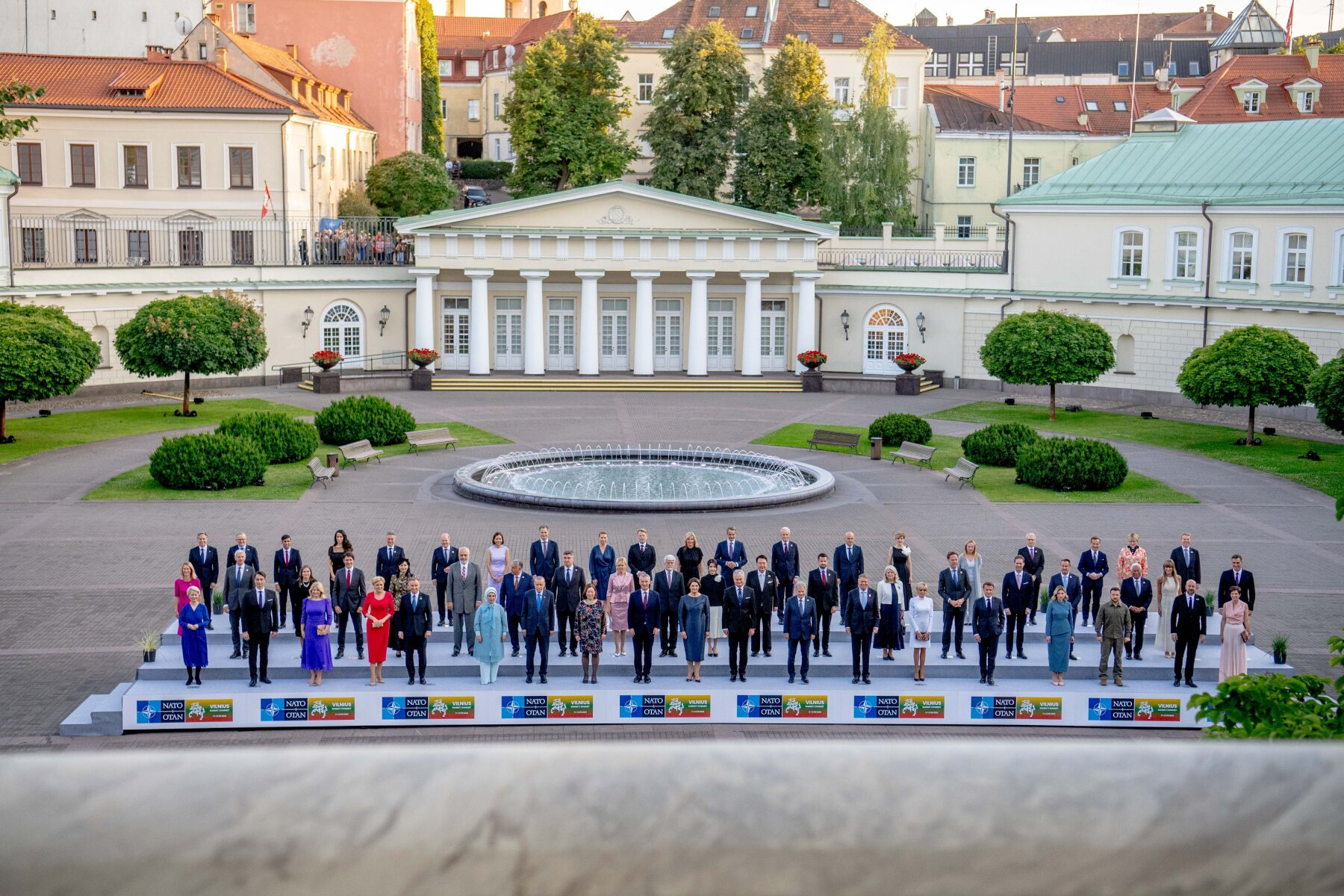
Guests of the 2023 Vilnius (NATO) summit in the Courtyard of the Presidential Palace in Vilnius

In 2013, Lithuania was elected to the United Nations Security Council for a two-year term, becoming the first Baltic country elected to this post. During its membership, Lithuania actively supported Ukraine and often condemned Russia for the war in Ukraine, immediately earning Ukrainian esteem. As the war in Donbas progressed, President Dalia Grybauskaitė compared the Russian President Vladimir Putin to Josef Stalin and to Adolf Hitler; she also called Russia a "terrorist state".

In 2018 Lithuania, Latvia, and Estonia were awarded the Peace of Westphalia Prize for their exceptional model of democratic development and contribution to peace in the continent. In 2019 Lithuania condemned the Turkish offensive into north-eastern Syria. In December 2021, Lithuania reported that in an escalation of the diplomatic spat with China over its relations with Taiwan, China had stopped all imports from Lithuania. According to Lithuanian intelligence agencies, in 2023 there was an increase in Chinese intelligence activity against Lithuania, including cyberespionage and increased focus on Lithuania's internal affairs and foreign policy.

The 2023 NATO summit was held in Vilnius.

=== Military ===
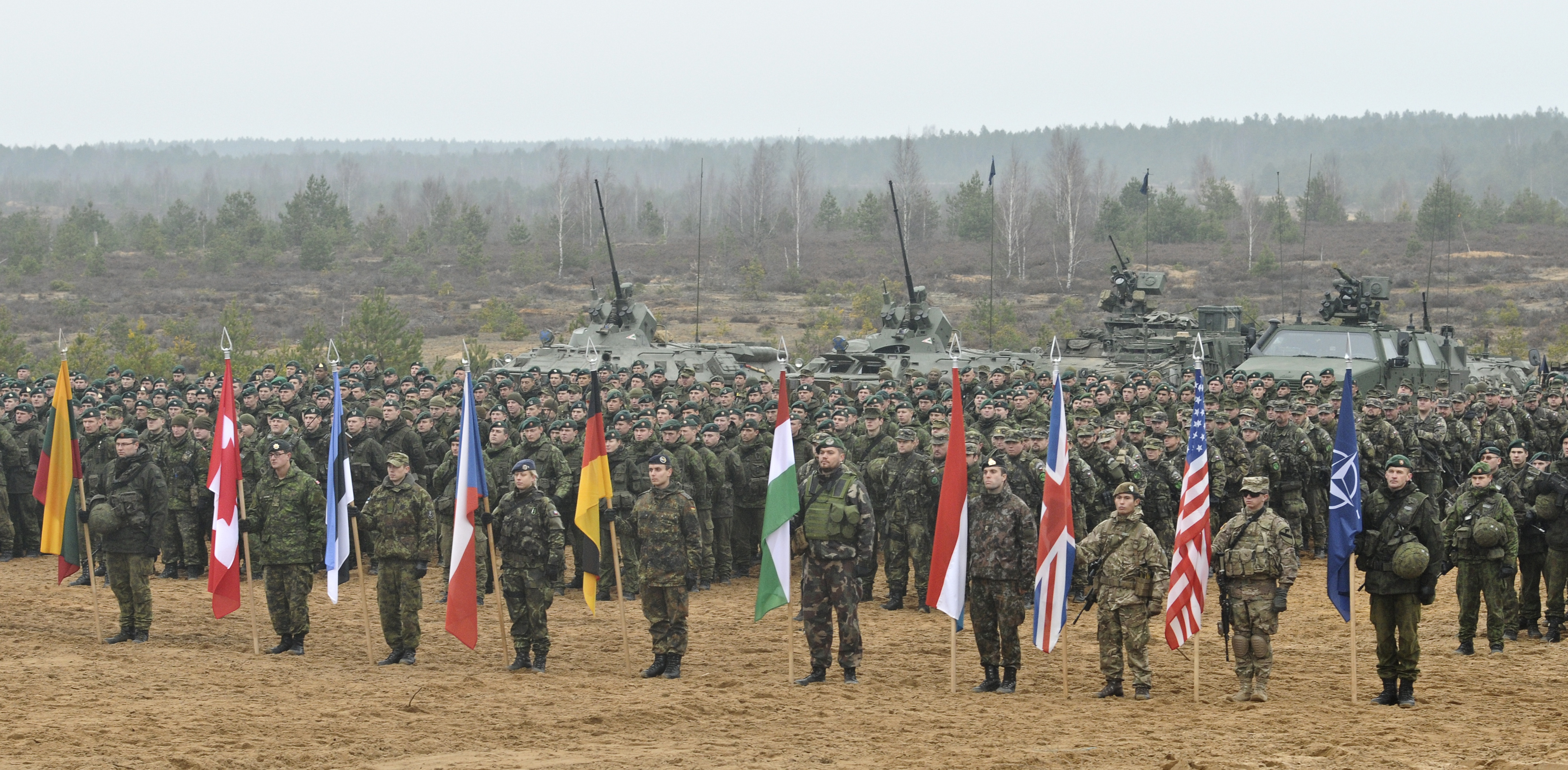
Lithuanian Army soldiers with their NATO allies during Iron Sword 2014

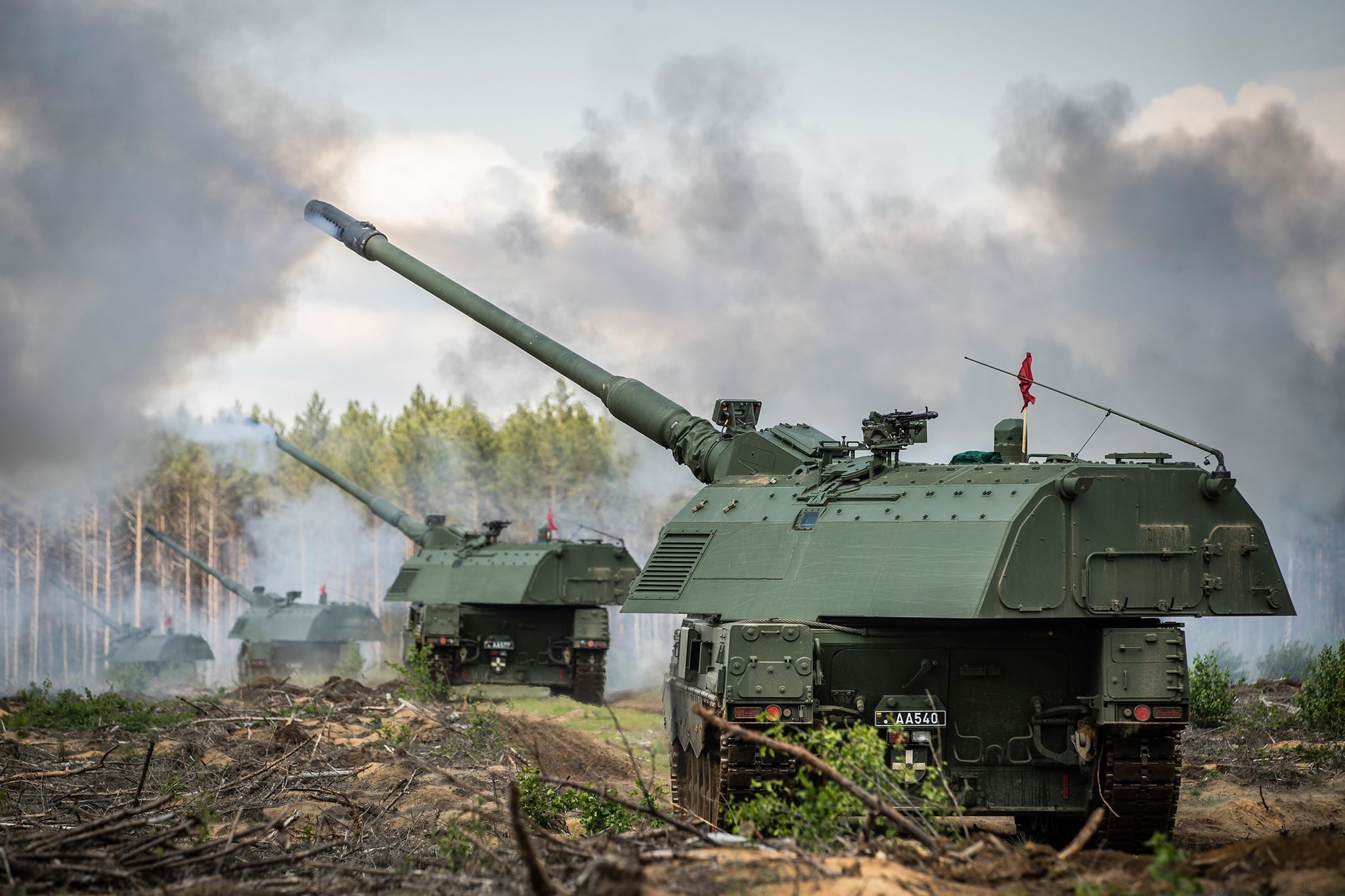
Lithuanian Panzerhaubitze 2000 firing during an exercise in 2022

The Lithuanian Armed Forces comprises the Lithuanian Land Force, Lithuanian Air Force, Lithuanian Naval Force, Lithuanian Special Operations Force and other units: Logistics Command, Training and Doctrine Command, Headquarters Battalion, Military Police. Directly subordinated to the Chief of Defence are the Special Operations Forces and Military Police. The Reserve Forces are under command of the Lithuanian National Defence Volunteer Forces.

The Lithuanian Armed Forces consist of some 20,000 active personnel, which may be supported by reserve forces. Compulsory conscription ended in 2008 but was reintroduced in 2015. As of 2024, the Lithuanian Armed Forces have 30 soldiers and officers participating in nine international operations and European Union training missions deployed in Kosovo, Iraq, Central African Republic, Djibouti, Mozambique, Spain, Italy, and in the United Kingdom, providing training for Ukrainian soldiers on Operation Interflex.

Lithuania became a full member of NATO in March 2004. Fighter jets of NATO members are deployed in Šiauliai Air Base and provide security for the Baltic airspace. Since 2014, Lithuania participates in the British-led Joint Expeditionary Force.

Beginning in summer of 2005, Lithuania was part of the International Security Assistance Force in Afghanistan, leading a Provincial Reconstruction Team in Chaghcharan in Ghor Province. Since joining international operations in 1994, Lithuania has lost two soldiers: Lieutenant Normundas Valteris fell in Bosnia, as his patrol vehicle drove over a mine. Sergeant Arūnas Jarmalavičius was fatally wounded during an attack on the camp of his Provincial Reconstruction Team in Afghanistan.

The Lithuanian National Defence Policy aims to guarantee the preservation of the independence and sovereignty of the state, the integrity of its land, territorial waters and airspace, and its constitutional order. Its main strategic goals are to defend the country's interests, and to maintain and expand the capabilities of its armed forces so they may contribute to and participate in the missions of NATO and European Union member states.

The defense ministry is responsible for combat forces, search and rescue, and intelligence operations. The 5,000 border guards fall under the Interior Ministry's supervision and are responsible for border protection, passport and customs duties, and share responsibility with the navy for smuggling and drug trafficking interdiction. A special security department handles VIP protection and communications security. In 2015 National Cyber Security Centre of Lithuania was created. Paramilitary organisation Lithuanian Riflemen's Union acts as a civilian self-defence institution.

According to NATO, in 2020, Lithuania allocated 2.13% of its GDP to the national defense. For a long time, especially after the 2008 financial crisis, Lithuania lagged behind NATO allies in terms of defence spending. However, it increased funding, exceeding the NATO guideline of 2% in 2019. President Nausėda called for more NATO troops on 22 April 2022, saying NATO should increase its deployment of troops in Lithuania and elsewhere on Europe's eastern flank following the 2022 Russian invasion of Ukraine, during a meeting in Vilnius.

== Economy ==
Real GDP per capita development of Estonia, Latvia and Lithuania

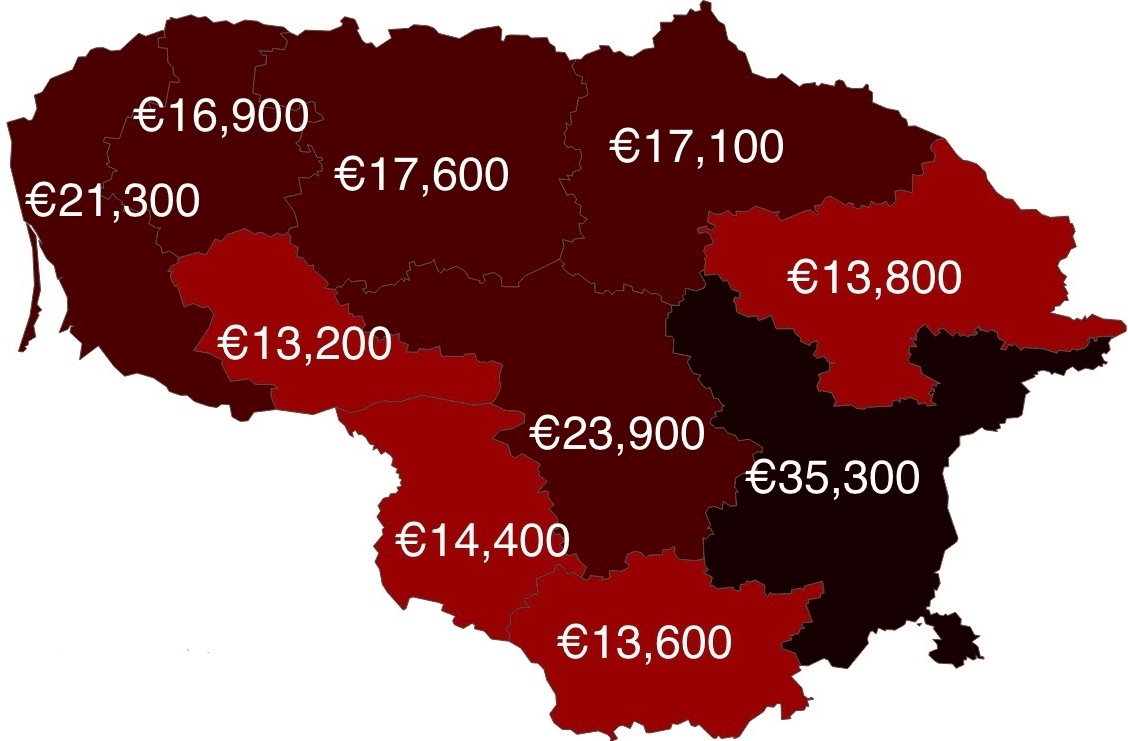
Lithuanian counties by GDP per capita, 2022

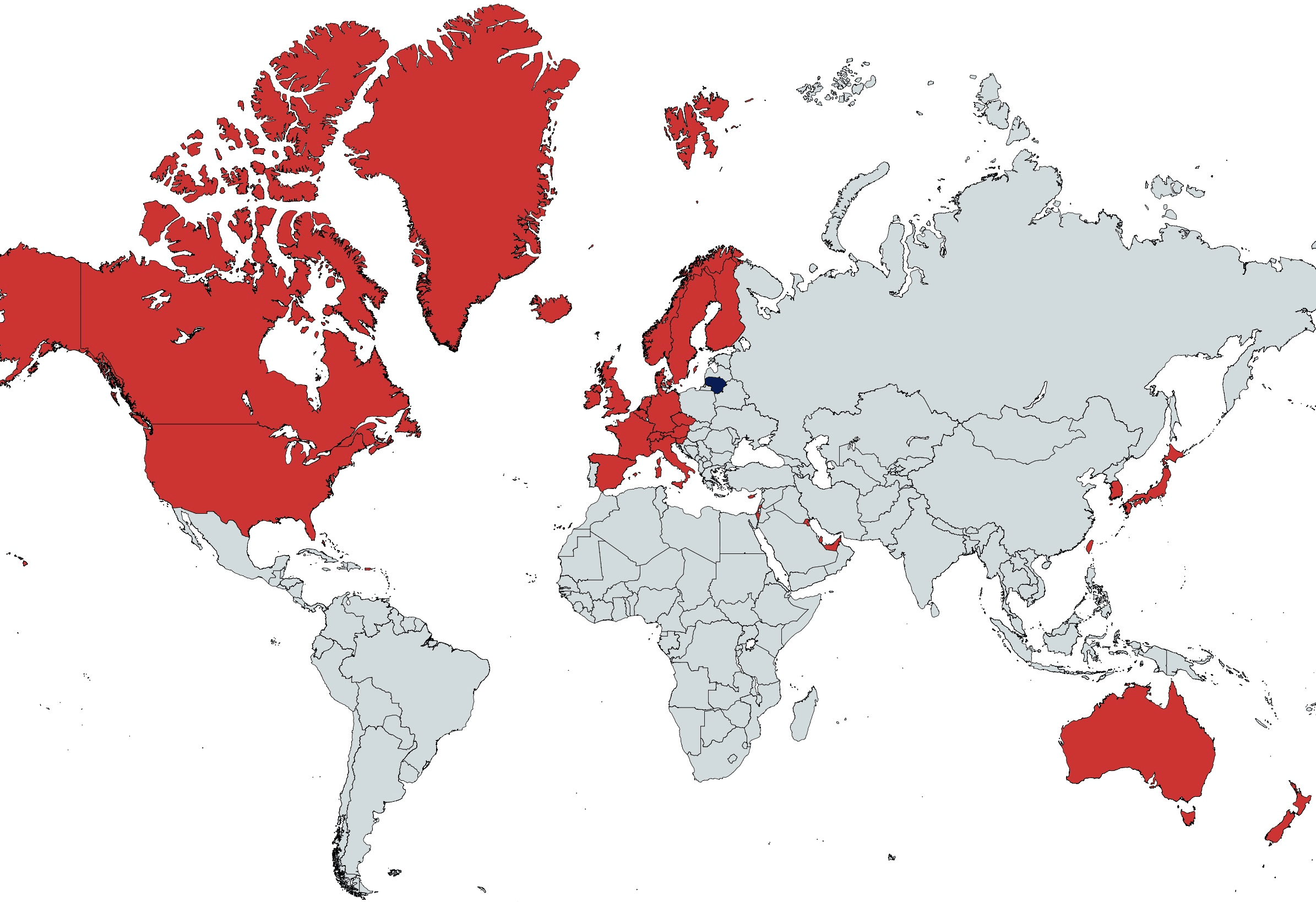
Comparison of Lithuania's GDP per capita to rest of the world where countries with higher GDP per capita are marked in red (2022)

Lithuania has an open and mixed economy that is classified as a high-income economy by the World Bank. As of 2017 the three largest sectors were services (63% of GDP), industry (24%) and agriculture (3%). On 1 January 2015, the euro became the national currency, replacing litas, which had been in circulation since 1993.

Mineral products comprised the largest share of exports (14%) in 2024; other major sectors include machinery and appliances, electrical equipment (14%), chemical products (11%), food, beverages and tobacco products (9%). The largest markets for exports were Latvia (12%), Poland (10%), and Germany (9%). Exports equaled 88% of GDP in 2022.

GDP experienced very high real growth rates for the decade up to 2009, peaking at 11% in 2007. As a result, the country was often termed a Baltic Tiger. However, in 2009 due to the 2008 financial crisis, GDP contracted 15% and unemployment rate reached 17.8% in 2010. Growth has since been much slower. According to the IMF, financial conditions are conducive to growth and financial soundness indicators remain strong. The public debt ratio in 2016 was 40% of GDP; it had been 15% in 2008.

On average, more than 95% of all foreign direct investment (FDI) comes from EU countries. Sweden is historically the largest investor with 20% – 30% of FDI. FDI into Lithuania spiked in 2017, reaching its highest ever recorded number of greenfield investment projects. In 2017, Lithuania was third, after Ireland and Singapore by the average job value of investment projects. The US was the leading source country in 2017, 25% of total FDI. Based on the Eurostat's data, in 2017 the value of exports recorded the most rapid growth of Baltic states and across Europe at 17%.

Between 2004 and 2016, one of five Lithuanians emigrated, seeking better opportunities and higher salaries abroad. Long term emigration and economic growth has resulted in a shortage in the labor market and growth in salaries being larger than growth in labor efficiency. Unemployment in 2017 was 8%. As of 2022, median wealth per adult was $32,000 (mean was $70,000), while total national wealth was $147 billion. As of 2023 Q2, the average monthly gross salary was €2,000. Implicit tax rates on labor, capital and corporate income in Lithuania have been among of the lowest in the EU. The nominal personal income tax rate is 20%, with 32% applied on high incomes. The corporate tax rate is 16% for most companies and 6% for small businesses; 7 free economic zones operate.

Information technology production is growing, reaching €2 billion in 2016. In 2017, 35 financial technology companies came to Lithuania as a result of the government and Bank of Lithuania simplifying procedures. Lithuania has granted a total of 39 e-money licenses, second in the EU to the UK. In 2018, Google set up a payment company in Lithuania. Europe's first international blockchain centre launched in Vilnius in 2018. Since 2021, Lithuania has issued hundreds of licenses for cryptocurrency exchange and storage operations, making it one of the leading countries in the EU in this sector.

=== Agriculture ===
Agriculture has been one of Lithuania's most important occupations for many centuries. Accession to the European Union in 2004 ushered in a new agricultural era. The EU pursues a very high standard of food safety and purity. In 1999, the Seimas adopted a law on product safety, and in 2000 it adopted a law on food. The reform of the agricultural market has been carried out on the basis of these two laws.

In 2016, agricultural production was €2.3 billion. Cereal crops occupied the largest part (5710 tons); other significant types include: sugar beet (934 tons), rapeseed (393 tons) and potatoes (340 tons). Products totaling €4,385 million were exported to foreign markets, of which products for €3,165 million were of Lithuanian origin. Export of agricultural and food products accounted for 19% of all exports of goods.

Organic farming is becoming more popular. The status of organic growers and producers is granted by the public body Ekoagros. In 2016, there were 2539 such farms that occupied 225,542 hectares. Of these, 43% were cereals, 31% perennial grasses, 14% leguminous crops and 12% others.

=== Science and technology ===
Lithuania ranks moderately in the International Innovation Index, and is placed 15th among EU countries by the European Innovation Scoreboard. Lithuania was ranked 33rd in the Global Innovation Index in 2025. Lasers and biotechnology are flagship fields of the science and high-tech industry. Šviesos konversija ("Light Conversion") has developed a femtosecond laser system that has 80% market share worldwide, with applications in DNA research, ophthalmological surgeries, and nanotechnology. The Vilnius University Laser Research Center has developed one of the most powerful femtosecond lasers in the world dedicated primarily to oncological diseases. In 1963, Vytautas Straižys and his colleagues created Vilnius photometric system that is used in astronomy. Noninvasive intracranial pressure and blood flow measuring devices were developed by Kaunas University of Technology scientist A. Ragauskas. Kęstutis Pyragas contributed to the study of chaos theory with his method of delayed feedback control, the Pyragas method. Kavli Prize laureate Virginijus Šikšnys is known for his discoveries in CRISPR, namely with respect to CRISPR-Cas9.

Lithuania has launched three satellites to space: LitSat-1, Lituanica SAT-1 and LituanicaSAT-2. Lithuanian Museum of Ethnocosmology and Molėtai Astronomical Observatory is located in Kulionys. Fifteen R&D institutions are members of Lithuanian Space Association; Lithuania is a cooperating state with European Space Agency. Rimantas Stankevičius is the only ethnically Lithuanian astronaut.

Lithuania in 2018 became an Associated Member State of CERN. Two CERN incubators in Vilnius and Kaunas will be hosted. The most advanced scientific research is being conducted at the Life Sciences Center, Center For Physical Sciences and Technology. From 2011 to 2016, yearly growth of the biotech and life science sector reached 22%. 16 academic institutions, 15 R&D centres (science parks and innovation valleys) and more than 370 manufacturers operate in the life science and biotech industry. Lithuanian Innovation Center was created to provide support for innovations and research institutions.

=== Tourism ===
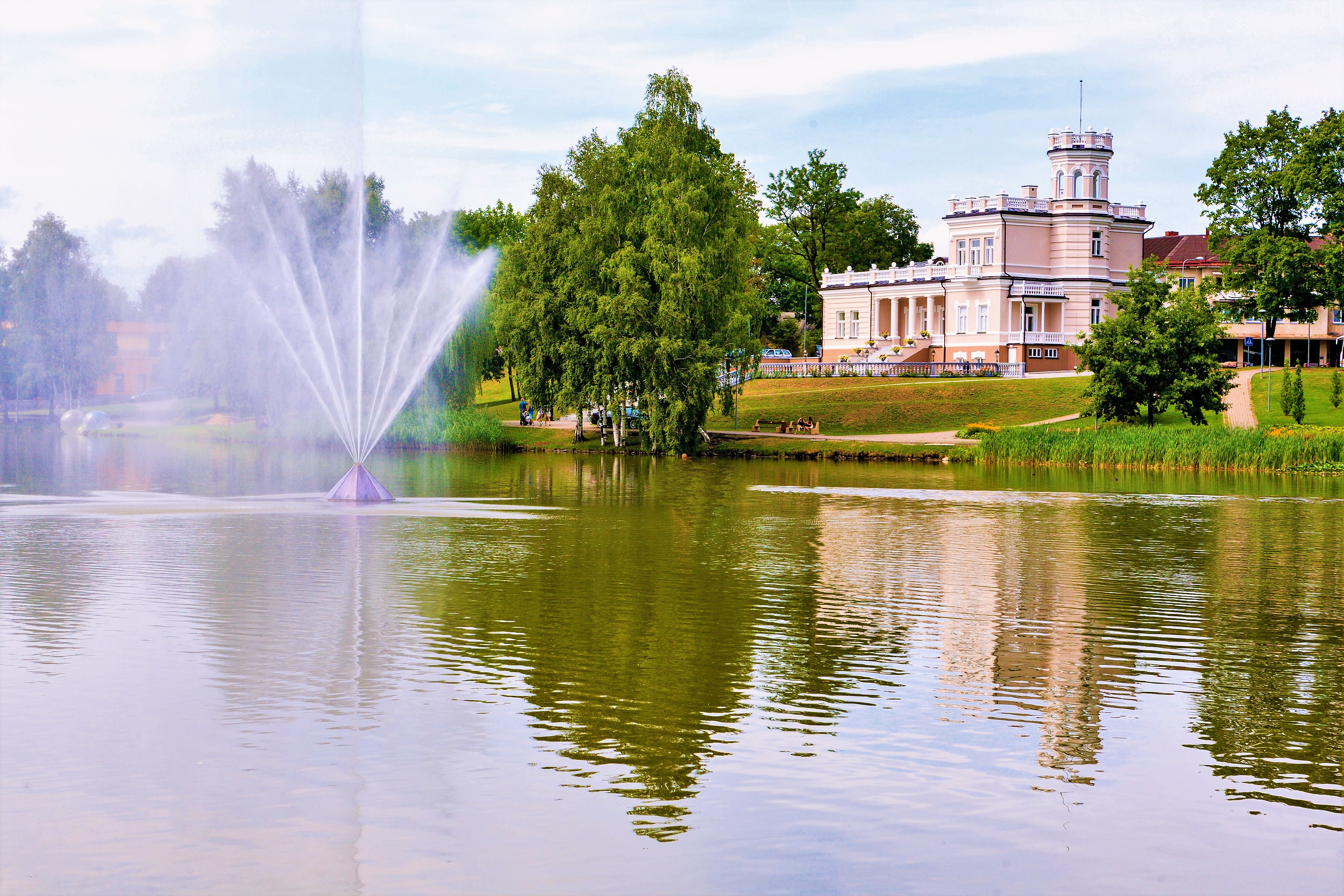
Druskininkai is a popular spa town.

Statistics from 2023 showed 1.4 million tourists from foreign countries visited Lithuania and spent at least one night. The largest number of tourists came from Poland (173,500), Latvia (144,300), Belarus (141,900), Germany (127,400), the United Kingdom (74,200), the United States (69,700), Ukraine (67,000), and Estonia (61,300).

Domestic tourism has been on the rise as well. Currently there are up to 1000 places of attraction in Lithuania. Most tourists visit the big cities—Vilnius, Klaipėda, and Kaunas, seaside resorts, such as Neringa, Palanga, and Spa towns – Druskininkai, Birštonas.

Hot air ballooning is popular, especially in Vilnius and Trakai. Bicycle tourism is growing, especially the Lithuanian Seaside Cycle Route. EuroVelo routes EV10, EV11, EV13 go through Lithuania. The total length of bicycle tracks amounts to 3769 km (of which 1988 km is asphalt pavement). Nemunas Delta Regional Park and Žuvintas biosphere reserve are known for birdwatching.

The total contribution of tourism to GDP had been forecast to rise to €3.2 billion, 7% of GDP by 2027, but has decreased to €1.7 billion, 2.3% of GDP in 2023, although it is rising post COVID-19 pandemic.

== Communication ==
Telia (skyscraper with the old Teo LT logo) and Huawei headquarters in Vilnius

Lithuania has a well developed communications infrastructure. The country has 2.8 million citizens and 5 million SIM cards. The largest LTE (4G) mobile network covers 97% of Lithuania's territory. Usage of fixed phone lines has been rapidly decreasing due to rapid expansion of mobile-cellular services. In 2017, Lithuania was top 30 in the world by average mobile broadband speeds and top 20 by average fixed broadband speeds. Lithuania was also top 7 in 2017 in the List of countries by 4G LTE penetration. In 2016, Lithuania was ranked 17th in United Nations' e-participation index. There are four TIER III datacenters in Lithuania. Lithuania is 44th globally ranked country on data center density according to Cloudscene.

Development of Rural Areas Broadband Network (RAIN) was started with the objective to provide residents, state and municipal authorities and businesses with fibre-optic broadband access in rural areas. RAIN infrastructure allows 51 communications operators to provide network services to their clients. The project was funded by the European Union and the Lithuanian government. 72% of households have access to internet, a number which in 2017 was among EU's lowest and in 2016 ranked 97th by CIA World Factbook. The number of households with internet access is expected to increase and reach 77% by 2021. Almost 50% of Lithuanians had smartphones in 2016, a number that is expected to increase to 65% by 2022. Lithuania has the highest FTTH (Fiber to the home) penetration rate in Europe (36.8% in September 2016) according to FTTH Council Europe.

== Infrastructure ==
=== Transport ===
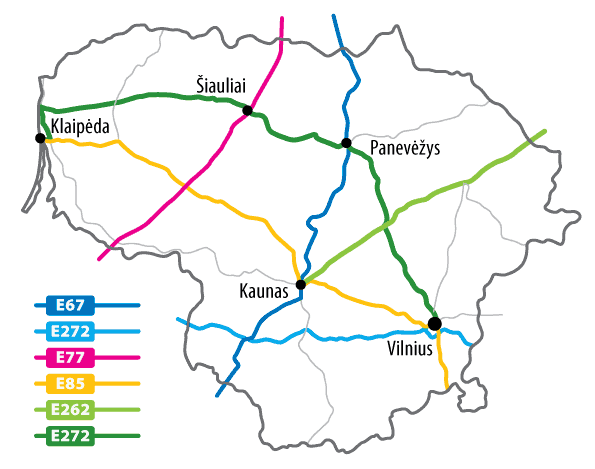
Major highways in Lithuania

Rail transport consists of 1,762 km (1,095 mi) of 1,520 mm (4 ft 11.8 in) Russian gauge railway, of which 122 km (76 mi) are electrified, and 115 km (71 mi) of European standard gauge lines starting at the Lithuania–Poland border. Lithuania received its first railway connection in the middle of the 19th century, when the Saint Petersburg–Warsaw railway was constructed. It included a stretch from Daugavpils via Vilnius and Kaunas to Virbalis. The first and only still operating Kaunas tunnel was completed in 1860. The Rail Baltica railway will link Kaunas to Finland, Estonia, Latvia, Poland, and Germany.

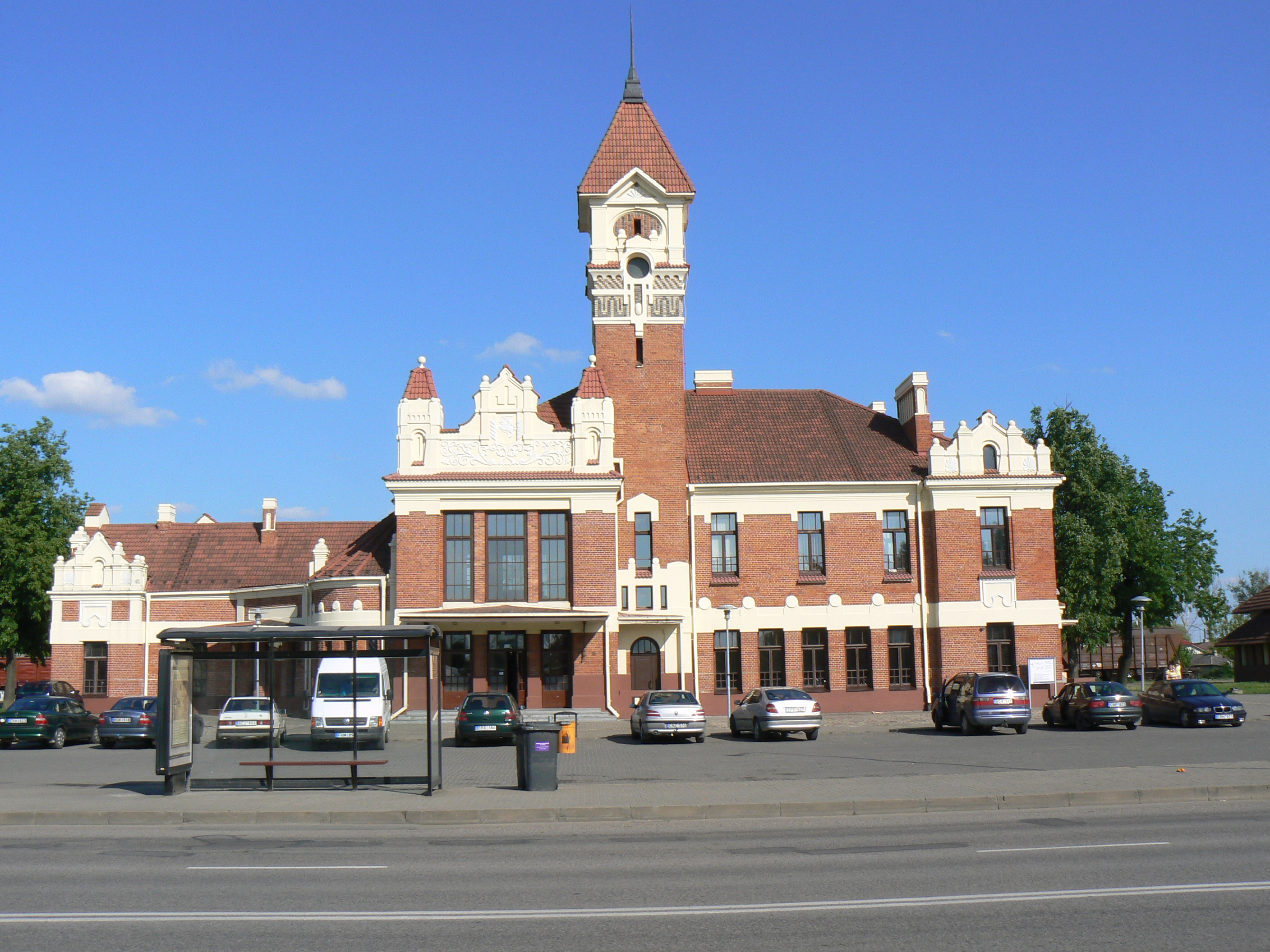
Marijampolė railway station, completed in 1924

Among EU countries, Lithuania has the highest share of freight transported by rail, at 31.7% in 2023. This has dropped over 50% since 2018, caused mainly by sanctions imposed on Belarusian exports and Russia. In 2017, Lithuanian Railways (Lietuvos Geležinkeliai), the company that operates most of the railway lines, received an EU penalty for breaching the EU's antitrust laws and restricting competition in rail freight.

Lithuania has an extensive network of motorways. WEF grades Lithuanian roads at 4.7 / 7.0 and the Lithuanian road authority (LAKD) at 6.5 / 10.0. Lithuanian trucking companies drew attention in 2016 and 2017 with huge and record-breaking orders of trucks. Almost 90% of commercial truck traffic is international transport, the highest of any EU country. Transportation is the third largest sector of the Lithuanian economy. The sector accounts for 40% of national energy consumption and 75% of oil usage. The car fleet is among the oldest within the European Union and constitutes the most significant single source of domestic greenhouse gas emissions.

The Port of Klaipėda is the only commercial cargo port in Lithuania. In 2011, 45.5 million tons of cargo were handled (including Būtingė oil terminal figures). The port is not among the EU's 20 largest ports, but it is the eighth largest port in the Baltic Sea region with ongoing expansion plans. As of 2022, the LIWA (Lithuanian Inland Waterways Authority, Vidaus vandens keliu direkcija in Lithuanian) is developing a strategy to resurrect cargo shipping on the Nemunas. Its fleet of electric ships will travel 260 km between the Port of Klaipda and the industrial and transportation centre of Kaunas. The project is anticipated to need a €75.7 million initial investment, and estimated to eliminate 48,000 truck trips annually. The inland river cargo port in Marvelė, linking Kaunas and Klaipėda, received its first cargo in 2019.

Vilnius Airport is the largest airport in Lithuania and 91st busiest airport in Europe. It served 3.8 million passengers in 2016. Other airports include Kaunas Airport, Palanga International Airport and Šiauliai Airport. Kaunas Airport is a small commercial cargo airport that started regular commercial cargo traffic in 2011.

=== Energy ===
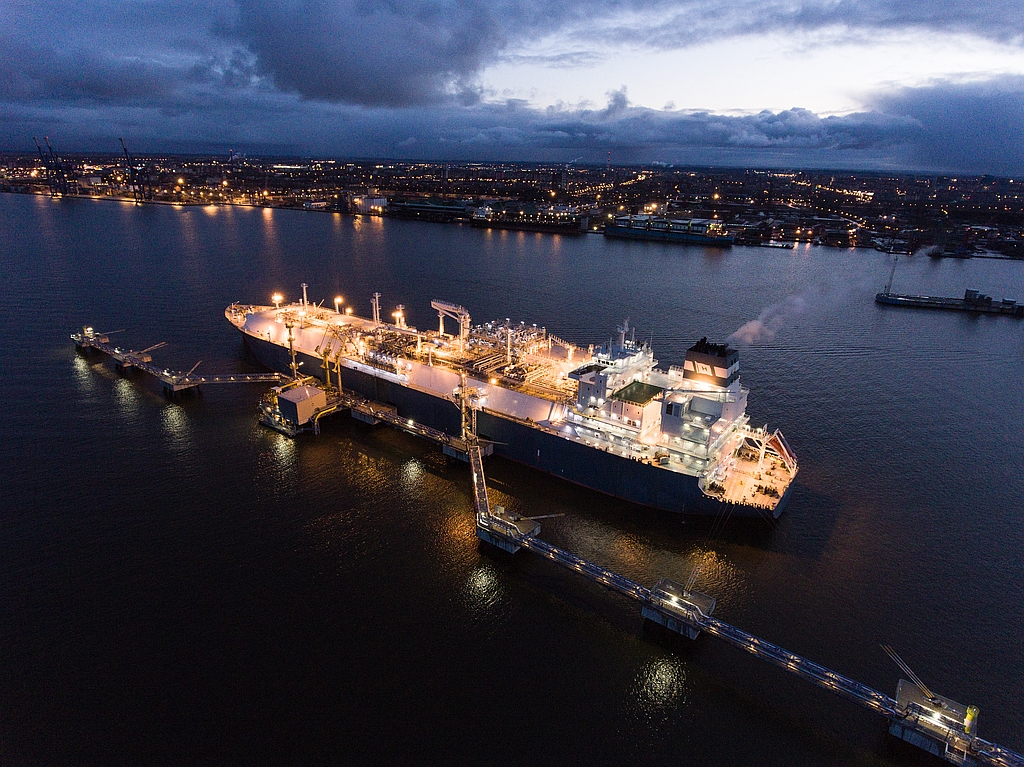
FSRU Independence in port of Klaipėda

Systematic diversification of energy imports and resources is the key energy strategy. Long-term aims were defined in National Energy Independence strategy in 2012. It was estimated that strategic energy independence initiatives will cost €6.3–7.8 billion and provide annual savings of €0.9–1.1 billion.

After the decommissioning of the Ignalina Nuclear Power Plant, Lithuania turned from electricity exporter to electricity importer. As of 2015, 66% of electrical power was imported. Unit No. 1 was closed in 2004, as a condition of entry into the European Union; Unit No. 2 was closed down in 2009. Proposals have been made to construct a new Visaginas Nuclear Power Plant. However, a non-binding referendum held in 2012 clouded the prospects for the Visaginas project, as 63% of voters said no to a new nuclear power plant.

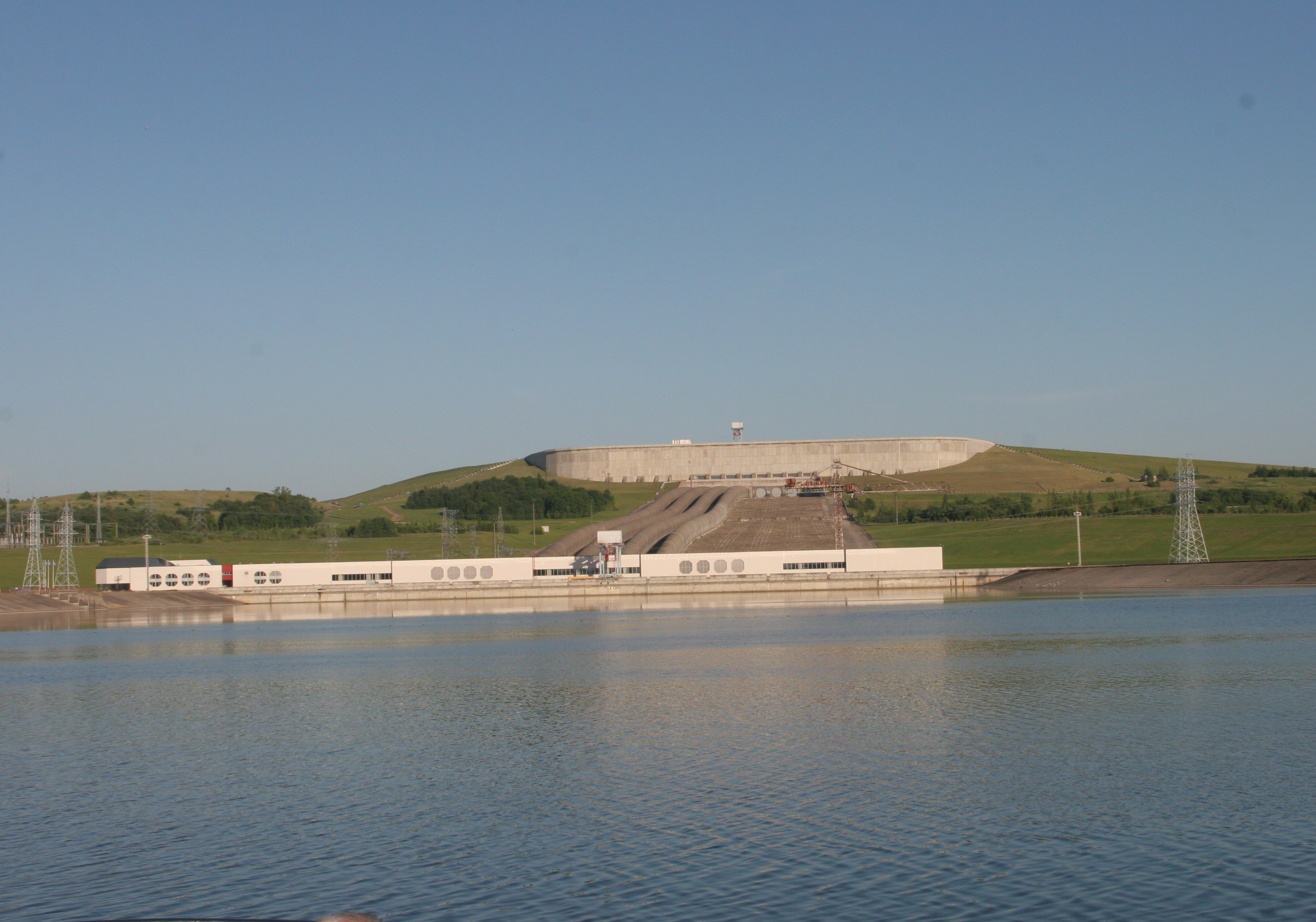
Kruonis Pumped Storage Plant

The main source of electrical power is the Elektrėnai Power Plant. Other primary sources are the Kruonis Pumped Storage Plant and Kaunas Hydroelectric Power Plant. Kruonis Pumped Storage Plant is the only power plant in the Baltic states to be used for regulation of the power system's operation with generating capacity of 900 MW for at least 12 hours. First geothermal heating plant (Klaipėda Geothermal Demonstration Plant) in the Baltic Sea region was built in 2004.

Lithuania–Sweden submarine electricity interconnection NordBalt and Lithuania–Poland electricity interconnection LitPol Link were launched at the end of 2015. In 2018, synchronising the Baltic states' electricity grid with the Synchronous grid of Continental Europe has started. In 2016, 20.8% of electricity consumed in Lithuania came from renewable sources.

In order to break down Gazprom's natural gas monopoly the first large scale LNG import terminal (Klaipėda LNG FSRU) in the Baltic region was built in the port of Klaipėda in 2014. The Klaipėda LNG terminal was called Independence, thus emphasising the aim to diversify the energy market of Lithuania. Norwegian company Equinor supplies 540 million cubic metres (19 billion cubic feet) of natural gas annually from 2015 until 2020. The terminal is able to meet 100% of demand, and is projected to meet 90% of the demand in Latvia and Estonia. Gas Interconnection Poland–Lithuania, also known as Lithuania–Poland pipeline, became operational in 2022.

== Demographics ==
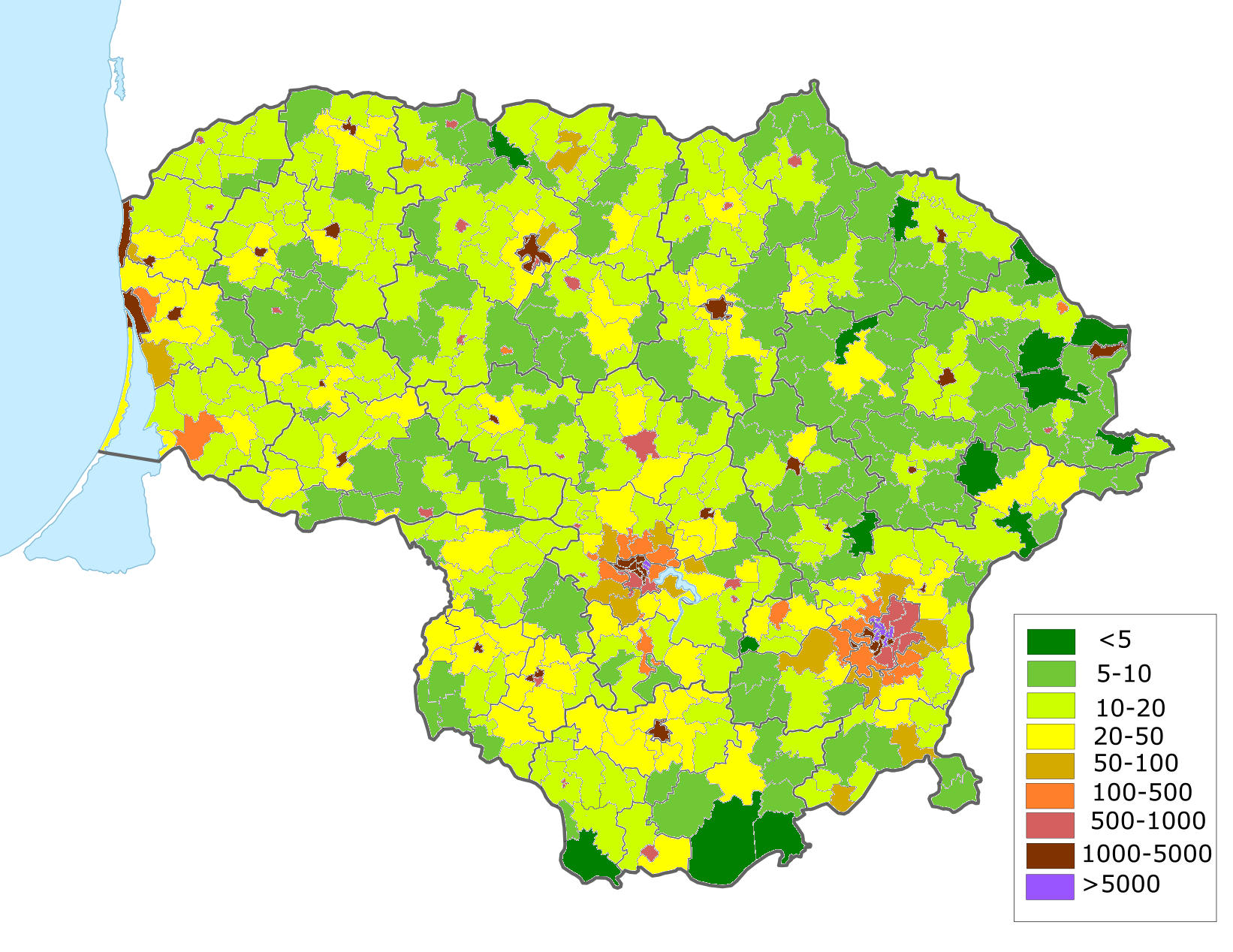
Population density in Lithuania by elderships (administrative units)

Since the Neolithic period, the demographics of Lithuania have stayed fairly homogeneous. There is a high probability that the inhabitants of present-day Lithuania have similar genetic compositions to their ancestors, although without being actually isolated from them. The population has little apparent genetic differences among ethnic subgroups. A 2004 analysis of MtDNA revealed that Lithuanians are genetically close to the Slavic and Finno-Ugric speaking populations of northern and eastern Europe. Y-chromosome SNP haplogroup analysis showed Lithuanians to be genetically closest to Latvians and Estonians.

The median age in 2022 was 44 years (male: 41, female: 47). In 2021, the age structure of the population was as follows:

- 0–14 years, 14.86% (male 214,113/female 203,117)
- 15–64 years: 65.19% (male 896,400/female 934,467)
- 65 years and over: 19.95% (male 195,269/female 365,014).

Lithuania has a sub-replacement fertility rate: the total fertility rate was 1.34 children born per woman in 2021, and the mean age of women at childbirth was 30.3 years. The average age of first childbirth for women was 28.2 years. The human sex ratio is male leaning for the age categories 15–44, with 1.0352 males for every female. As of 2021, 25.6% of births were to unmarried women. The mean age at first marriage in 2021 was 28.3 years for women and 30.5 years for men.

=== Functional urban areas ===
Functional urban areas	Population (2023)
Vilnius urban area	▲747,864
Kaunas urban area	▲403,375
Panevėžys urban area	▲122,860

=== Ethnic groups and languages ===
Ethnic Lithuanians make up about 80% of the country's population. In 2024, 82.6% of residents were ethnic Lithuanians. Several sizeable minorities exist, such as Poles (6.3%), Russians (5.0%), Belarusians (2.1%) and Ukrainians (1.7%). Poles in Lithuania are the largest minority, concentrated in southeast Lithuania (the Vilnius Region), constituting majority in Šalčininkai (76.3%) and Vilnius District Municipality (46.8%). Russians in Lithuania are the second largest minority, concentrated in Visaginas (47.4%), Zarasai District Municipality (17.2%) and Klaipėda (16%). About 2,250 Roma live in Lithuania, mostly in Vilnius, Kaunas and Panevėžys; their organisations are supported by the National Minority and Emigration Department. For centuries, Tatar and Karaite communities have lived in Lithuania. In 2021, there were around 2,150 registered Tatars and 196 Karaites in the country.

The official language is Lithuanian, but in some areas there is a significant presence of minority languages such as Polish, Russian, Belarusian and Ukrainian. The greatest presence of minorities and the use of these languages are in Šalčininkai, Visaginas, and Vilnius District. In 1941, the Jewish population reached its peak at approximately 250,000 people, making up about 10% of the population. Today, however, it has dwindled to a very small number. Yiddish is spoken by members of the tiny remaining Jewish community. The state laws guarantee education in minority languages, and there are numerous publicly funded schools in the areas populated by minorities, with Polish as the language of instruction being the most widely available.

According to the survey carried out within the framework of the Lithuanian census of 2021, 85.33% of the population speaks Lithuanian as their native language, 6.8% are native speakers of Russian and 5.1% of Polish. As of 2021, 60.6% of residents speak Russian as a foreign language, 31.1% English, 10.5% Lithuanian, 8% German, 7.9% Polish, 1.9% French, and 2.6% other languages. Most schools teach English as the first foreign language, but students may also study German, French and Spanish; Russian is available as a second foreign language. Around 85% of upper secondary school students were studying English in 2022, and around 80% of people in the 15-19 age group reported knowing English in 2011.

=== Urbanisation ===
There has been a steady movement of population to the cities since the 1990s, encouraged by the planning of regional centres, such as Alytus, Marijampolė, Utena, Plungė, and Mažeikiai. By the early 21st century, about two-thirds of the population lived in urban areas. As of 2021, 68.19% of the population lives in urban areas. Functional urban areas include Vilnius (population 708,203), Kaunas (population 391,153), and Panevėžys (population 124,526). The fDI of the Financial Times in their research Cities and Regions of the Future ranked Vilnius fourth in the mid-sized European cities category in the 2018–19 ranking, second in the 2022–23 ranking, second in 2023 ranking while the city claimed 24th spot in the worldwide overall ranking in 2021–22 and Vilnius county was ranked 10th in the small European regions category in 2018–19, fifth in 2022–23, fifth in 2023 rankings.

Largest cities or towns in Lithuania State Data Agency (2026)
Rank	Name	County	Pop.	Rank	Name	County	Pop.
1	Vilnius	Vilnius	619,405	11	Kėdainiai	Kaunas	23,190
2	Kaunas	Kaunas	303,613	12	Tauragė	Tauragė	21,656
3	Klaipėda	Klaipėda	160,295	13	Telšiai	Telšiai	21,350
4	Šiauliai	Šiauliai	111,359	14	Ukmergė	Vilnius	20,857
5	Panevėžys	Panevėžys	83,857	15	Palanga	Klaipėda	19,545
6	Alytus	Alytus	49,467	16	Visaginas	Utena	18,640
7	Marijampolė	Marijampolė	35,672	17	Kretinga	Klaipėda	16,971
8	Mažeikiai	Telšiai	32,664	18	Plungė	Telšiai	16,552
9	Utena	Utena	26,125	19	Šilutė	Klaipėda	15,687
10	Jonava	Kaunas	26,119	20	Gargždai	Klaipėda	15,591

=== Health ===
Kaunas Clinics, a medical institution in Lithuania

Lithuania provides free state-funded healthcare to all citizens and registered long-term residents. It co-exists with a significant private healthcare sector. In 2003–2012, the network of hospitals was restructured, as part of wider healthcare service reforms. It started in 2003–2005 with the expansion of ambulatory services and primary care. In 2016, Lithuania ranked 27th in Europe in the Euro health consumer index, a ranking of European healthcare systems based on waiting time, results and other indicators. Lithuania ranked 19th in the 2024 edition of the World Happiness Report.

As of 2023, life expectancy at birth was 76.0 (70.6 years for males and 81.6 for females) and the infant mortality rate was 2.99 per 1,000 births. The annual population growth rate increased by 0.3% in 2007. Lithuania has seen a dramatic rise in suicides in the 1990s. The suicide rate has been constantly decreasing since, but it still remains the highest in the EU and one of the highest in the OECD. The suicide rate as of 2019 is 20.2 per 100,000 people. Suicide in Lithuania has been a subject of research, but the main reasons behind the high rate are psychological and economic, including social transformations and economic recessions, alcoholism, lack of tolerance in the society, and bullying.

By 2000, the vast majority of health care institutions were non-profit-making enterprises and a private sector developed, providing mostly outpatient services which are paid for out-of-pocket. The Ministry of Health also runs a few health care facilities and is involved in the running of the two major Lithuanian teaching hospitals. It is responsible for the State Public Health Centre which manages the public health network including ten county public health centres with their local branches. The ten counties run county hospitals and specialised health care facilities.

There is Compulsory Health Insurance for the Lithuanian residents. There are 5 territorial health insurance funds, covering Vilnius, Kaunas, Klaipėda, Šiauliai and Panevėžys. Contributions for people who are economically active are 9% of income. Emergency medical services are provided free of charge to all residents. Access to the secondary and tertiary care, such as hospital treatment, is normally via referral by a general practitioner. Lithuania has one of the lowest health care prices in Europe.

=== Religion ===
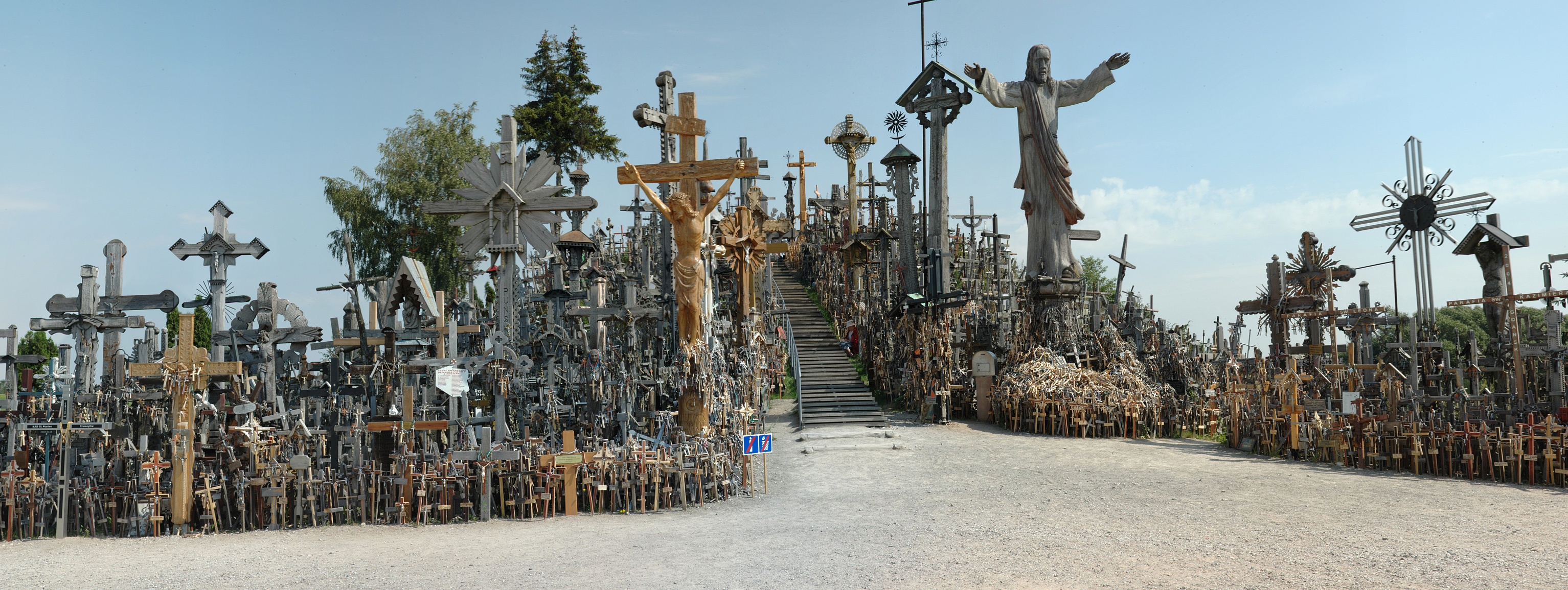
Hill of Crosses near Šiauliai

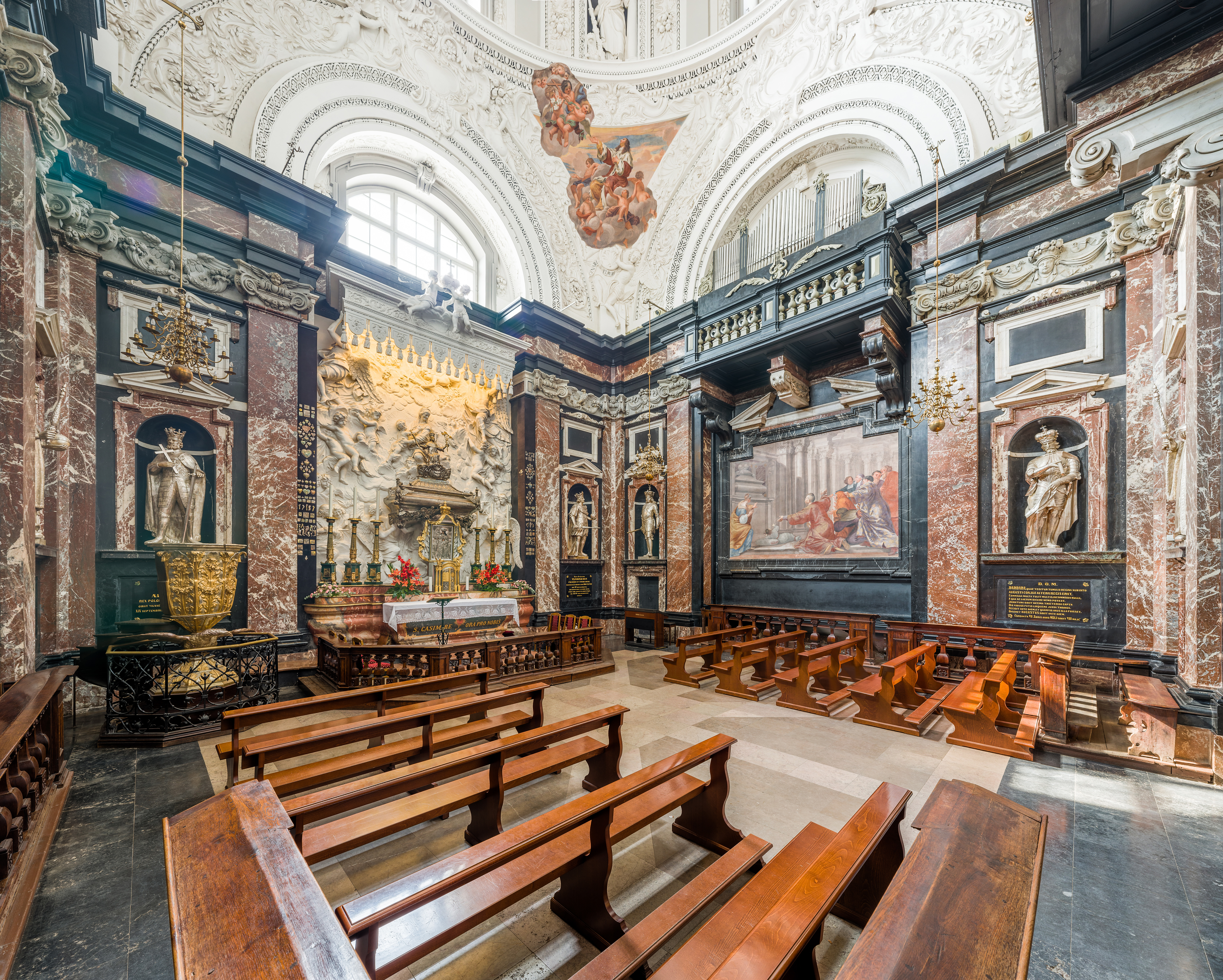
Chapel of Saint Casimir, the patron saint of Lithuania and Lithuanian youth, with his sarcophagus in the centre

According to the 2021 census, 74.2% of residents were Catholics. Catholicism has been the main religion since the official Christianisation of Lithuania in 1387. The Catholic Church was persecuted by the Russian Empire as part of the Russification policies and by the Soviet Union as part of the overall anti-religious campaigns. During the Soviet era, some priests actively led the resistance against the communist regime, as symbolised by the Hill of Crosses and exemplified by The Chronicle of the Catholic Church in Lithuania.

3.7% of the population are Eastern Orthodox, mainly among the Russian minority. The community of Old Believers (0.6% of population) dates back to the 1660s. Protestants are 0.8%, of which 0.6% are Lutheran and 0.2% are Reformed. Before World War II, according to Losch (1932), the Lutherans were 3.3% of the total population. They were mainly Germans and Prussian Lithuanians in the Klaipėda Region (Memel territory). This population fled or was expelled after the war, and Protestantism is now mainly represented by ethnic Lithuanians throughout the northern and western parts of the country, as well as in large urban areas. Newly arriving evangelical churches have established missions since 1990.

Hinduism is a minority religion and a fairly recent development. Hinduism is spread by Hindu organisations: ISKCON, Sathya Sai Baba, Brahma Kumaris and Osho Rajneesh. ISKCON (Lithuanian: Krišnos sąmonės judėjimas) is the largest and the oldest movement as the first Krishna followers date to 1979. Brahma Kumaris maintains the Centre Brahma Kumaris in Antakalnis, Vilnius.

The historical communities of Lipka Tatars maintain Islam as their religion. Lithuania was historically home to a significant Jewish community and was an important centre of Jewish scholarship and culture from the 18th century until the eve of World War II. Of the approximately 220,000 Jews who lived in Lithuania in June 1941, almost all were killed during the Holocaust. The Lithuanian Jewish community (now with an umbrella body, the Lithuanian Jewish Community), numbered about 4,000 at the end of 2009.

Romuva, the neopagan revival of the ancient religious practices, has gained popularity over the years. Romuva claims to continue living pagan traditions, which survived in folklore and customs. Romuva is a polytheistic pagan faith, which asserts the sanctity of nature and has elements of ancestor worship. According to the 2001 census, there were 1,270 people of Baltic faith in Lithuania. That number jumped to 5,118 in the 2011 census and decreased to 3,917 in 2021 census.

=== Education ===
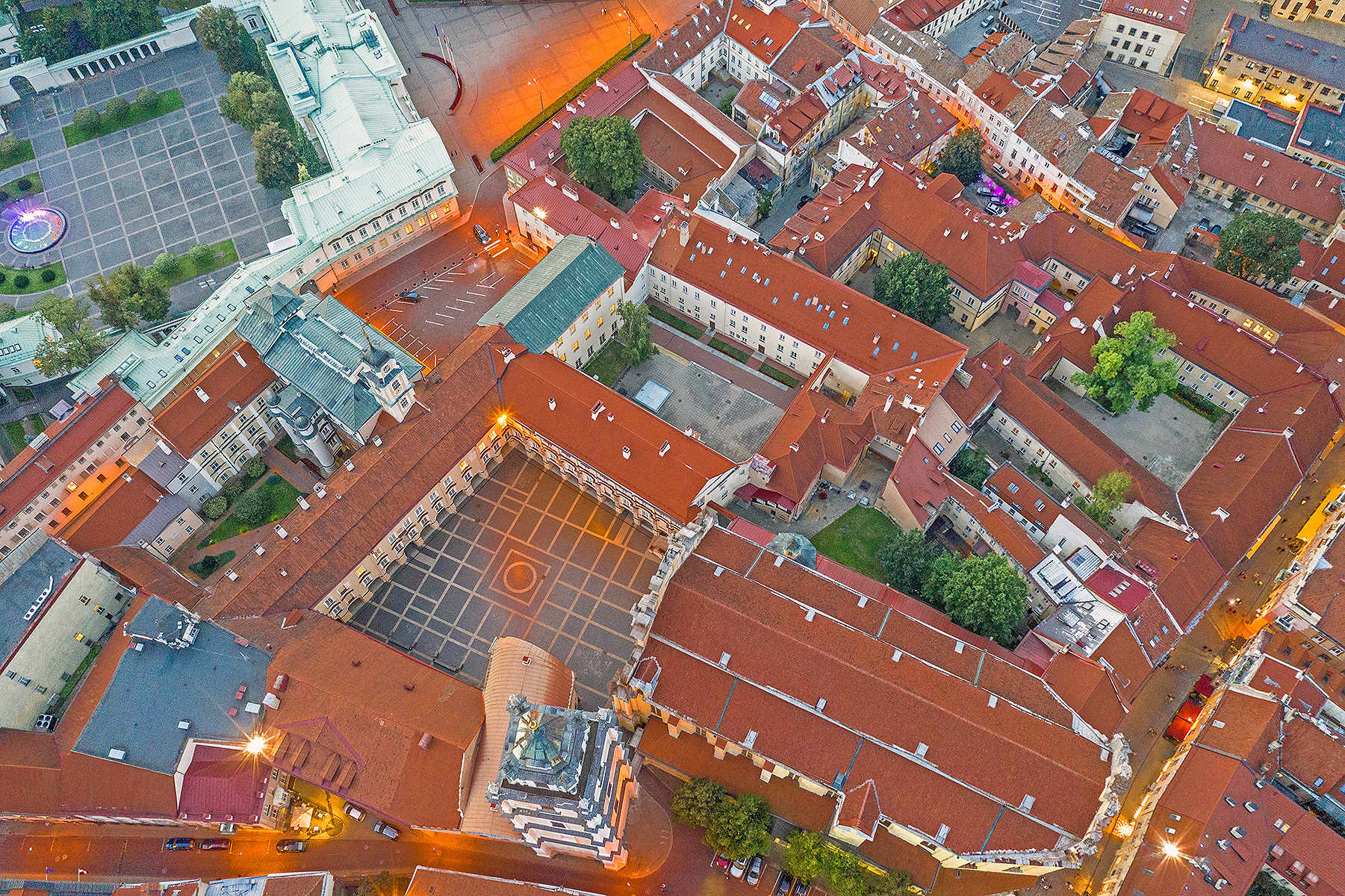
Vilnius University, one of the oldest universities in the region. It was established by Stephen Báthory, King of Poland and Grand Duke of Lithuania, in 1579.

The constitution mandates ten-year education ending at age 16 and guarantees a free public higher education for students deemed 'good'. The Ministry of Education and Science of the Republic of Lithuania proposes national educational policies and goals that are then voted for in the Seimas. Laws govern long-term educational strategy along with general laws on standards for higher education, vocational training, law and science, adult education, and special education. 5.4% of GDP or 15.4% of total public expenditure was spent for education in 2016.

Vilnius University Life Sciences Center in the Sunrise Valley

According to the World Bank, the literacy rate among Lithuanians aged 15 years and older is 100%. School attendance rates are above the EU average, and school leave is less common than in the EU. According to Eurostat Lithuania leads among other countries of the European Union in people with secondary education (93.3%). Based on OECD data, Lithuania is among the top 5 countries in the world in postsecondary (tertiary) education attainment. As of 2022, 58.15% of the population aged 25 to 34, and 33.28% of the population aged 55 to 64 had completed tertiary education. The share of tertiary-educated 25–64-year-olds in STEM (Science, technology, engineering, and mathematics) fields in Lithuania were above the OECD average (29% and 26% respectively), similarly to business, administration and law (25% and 23% respectively).

The modern education system has multiple structural problems. Insufficient funding, quality issues, and decreasing student population are the most prevalent. Teacher salaries are below the EU average, despite significant increases since 2011. Low teacher salaries was the primary reason behind national teacher strikes in 2014, 2015, and 2016. Salaries in the higher education sector are also low. Many professors have a second job to supplement their income. PISA report from 2022 found that results in math, science and reading were around OECD average, after trailing the OECD average in earlier reports in 2010 and 2015, although the relative improvement was primarily driven by the decrease in performance in the other OECD countries as a result of COVID-19 pandemic. The population ages 6 to 19 has decreased by 36% between 2005 and 2015. As a result, the student-teacher ratio is decreasing and expenditure per student is increasing, but schools, particularly in rural areas, are forced into reorganisations and consolidations. As with other Baltic nations, in particular Latvia, the large volume of higher education graduates within the country, coupled with the high rate of spoken second languages is contributing to an education brain drain.

As of 2008, there were 15 public and 6 private universities as well as 16 public and 11 private colleges. Vilnius University is one of the oldest universities in Northern Europe and the largest university in Lithuania. Kaunas University of Technology is the largest technical university in the Baltic States and the second largest university in Lithuania. In an attempt to reduce costs and adapt to sharply decreasing number of high-school students, parliament decided to reduce the number of universities. In early 2018, Lithuanian University of Educational Sciences and Aleksandras Stulginskis University were merged into Vytautas Magnus University.

== Culture ==
=== Lithuanian language ===
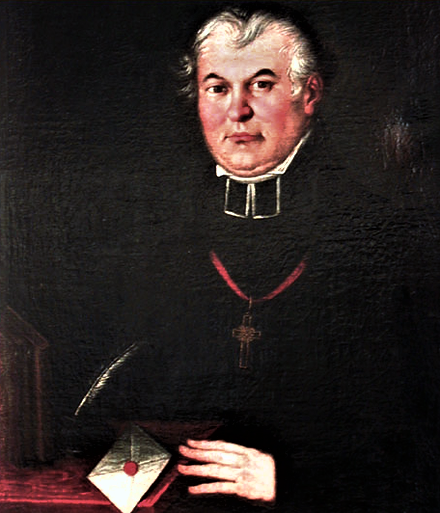
A priest, lexicographer Konstantinas Sirvydas – cherisher of Lithuanian language in the 17th century

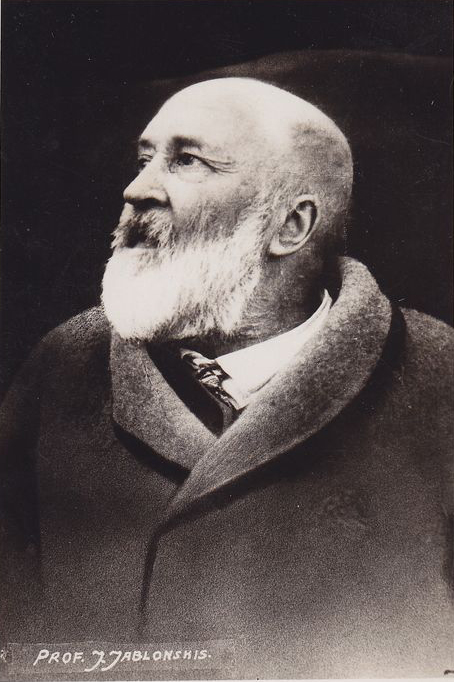
Jonas Jablonskis is the father of standard Lithuanian language.

The Lithuanian language (lietuvių kalba) is recognised as one of the official languages of the European Union. There are about 2.96 million native Lithuanian speakers in Lithuania and about 200,000 abroad. Lithuanian is a Baltic language, closely related to Latvian, although they are not mutually intelligible. It is written in an adapted version of the Roman script. Lithuanian is believed to be the linguistically most conservative living Indo-European tongue, retaining many features of Proto Indo-European. Lithuanian language studies are important for comparative linguistics and for reconstruction of Proto-Indo-European language.

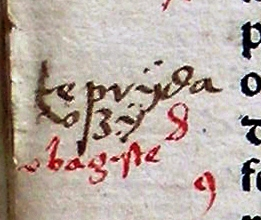
The earliest known Lithuanian glosses (between 1520 and 1530) written in the margins of Johann Herolt book Liber Discipuli de eruditione Christifidelium. Words: teprÿdav[ſ]ʒÿ (let it strike), vbagÿſte (indigence).

There are two main dialects: Aukštaitian dialect and Samogitian dialect. Aukštaitian dialect is mainly used in the central, southern and eastern parts of Lithuania while Samogitian dialect is used in the western part of the country. The Samogitian dialect has many completely different words and is even considered a separate language by some linguists. Nowadays, the distinguishing feature between the two dialects is the unequal pronunciation of accented and unaccented two-vowels uo and ie.

The groundwork for written Lithuanian was laid in 16th and 17th centuries by Lithuanian noblemen and scholars, who promoted Lithuanian language, created dictionaries and published books – Mikalojus Daukša, Stanislovas Rapolionis, Abraomas Kulvietis, Jonas Bretkūnas, Martynas Mažvydas, Konstantinas Sirvydas, Simonas Vaišnoras-Varniškis. The first grammar book of the Lithuanian language Grammatica Litvanica was published in Latin in 1653 by Danielius Kleinas.

Jonas Jablonskis' works and activities are especially important for the Lithuanian literature moving from the use of dialects to a standard Lithuanian language. The linguistic material which he collected was published in the 20 volumes of Academic Dictionary of Lithuanian and is still being used in research and in editing of texts and books. He also introduced the letter ū into Lithuanian writing.

=== Literature ===
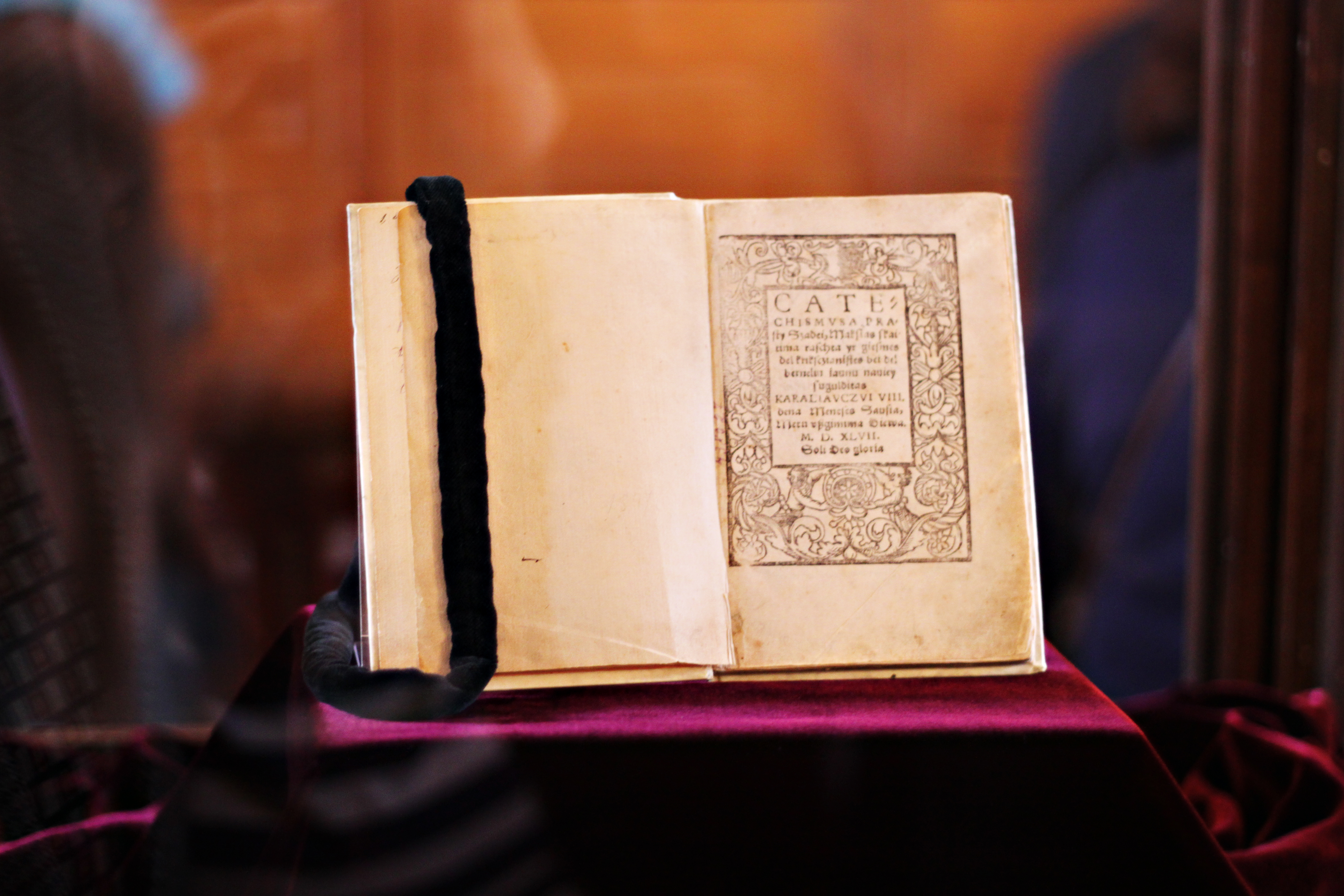
The first Lithuanian printed book, Catechism of Martynas Mažvydas (1547, Königsberg)

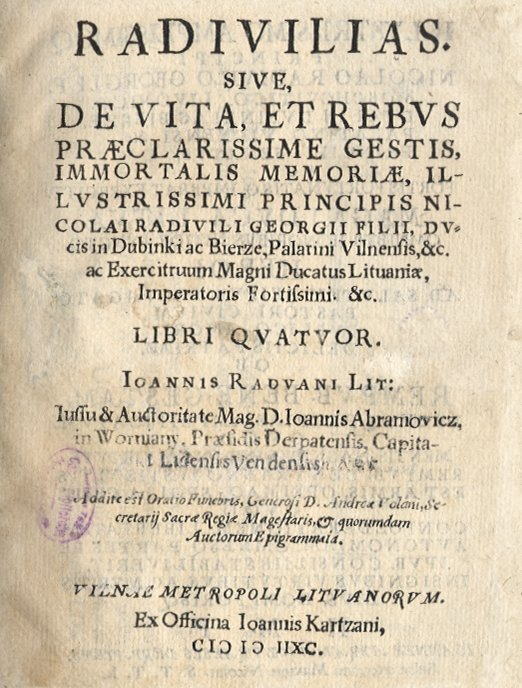
Title page of Radivilias (1592, Vilnius). The poem celebrating commander Mikołaj Radziwiłł the Red (1512–84) and recounts the famous victory of Lithuanian Armed Forces over Moscow troops (1564).

There is a great deal of Lithuanian literature written in Latin, the main scholarly language of the Middle Ages. The edicts of the King Mindaugas are the prime example of the literature of this kind. The Letters of Gediminas are another crucial heritage of the Lithuanian Latin writings.

One of the first Lithuanian authors who wrote in Latin was early Renaissance poet Nicolaus Hussovianus. His poem Carmen de statura, feritate ac venatione bisontis (A Song about the Appearance, Savagery and Hunting of the Bison), published in 1523, describes the Lithuanian landscape, way of life and customs, touches on some actual political problems, and reflects the clash of paganism and Christianity. A person under the pseudonym Michalo Lituanus wrote a treatise De moribus tartarorum, lituanorum et moscorum (On the Customs of Tatars, Lithuanians and Muscovites) in the middle of the 16th century. An extraordinary figure in the cultural life of Lithuania in the 16th century was the lawyer and poet of Spanish origin Petrus Roysius Maurus Alcagnicensis. The publicist, lawyer, and mayor of Vilnius, Augustinus Rotundus wrote a no longer existent history of Lithuania in Latin around 1560. loannes Radvanus, a humanist poet of the second half of the 16th century, wrote an epic poem imitating the Aeneid of Vergil. His Radivilias, intended to become the Lithuanian national epic, was published in Vilnius in 1588.

17th century Lithuanian scholars also wrote in Latin – Kazimieras Kojelavičius-Vijūkas, Žygimantas Liauksminas are known for their Latin writings in theology, rhetorics and music. Albertas Kojalavičius-Vijūkas wrote first printed Lithuanian history Historia Lithuania. Lithuanian literary works in the Lithuanian language started being published in the 16th century. In 1547 Martynas Mažvydas compiled and published the first printed Lithuanian book Simple Words of Catechism (Katekizmo paprasti žodžiai). He was followed by Mikalojus Daukša with Katekizmas. In the 16th and 17th centuries, as in the whole Christian Europe, Lithuanian literature was primarily religious.

The evolution of the old (14th–18th century) Lithuanian literature ends with Kristijonas Donelaitis, one of the most prominent authors of the Age of Enlightenment. Donelaitis' poem Metai (The Seasons) is a landmark of the Lithuanian fiction literature, written in hexameter. With a mix of Classicism, Sentimentalism and Romanticism, the Lithuanian literature of the first half of the 19th century is represented by Maironis, Antanas Baranauskas, Simonas Daukantas, Oscar Milosz, and Simonas Stanevičius. During the tsarist annexation of Lithuania in the 19th century, the Lithuanian press ban was implemented, which led to the formation of the knygnešiai (Lithuanian book smugglers) movement. 20th-century Lithuanian literature is represented by Juozas Tumas-Vaižgantas, Antanas Vienuolis, Bernardas Brazdžionis, Antanas Škėma, Balys Sruoga, Vytautas Mačernis and Justinas Marcinkevičius. In 21st century debuted Kristina Sabaliauskaitė, Laura Sintija Černiauskaitė, Rūta Šepetys.

=== Architecture ===
Several famous Lithuania-related architects are notable for their achievements in the field of architecture. Johann Christoph Glaubitz, Marcin Knackfus, Laurynas Gucevičius and Karol Podczaszyński were instrumental in introducing Baroque and neoclassical architectural movements to the Lithuanian architecture during the 17th to 19th centuries. Vilnius is considered a capital of the Eastern Europe Baroque. Vilnius Old Town has many Baroque churches and other buildings and is a UNESCO World Heritage Site. The Vilnian Baroque style is named after Lithuania's capital city.

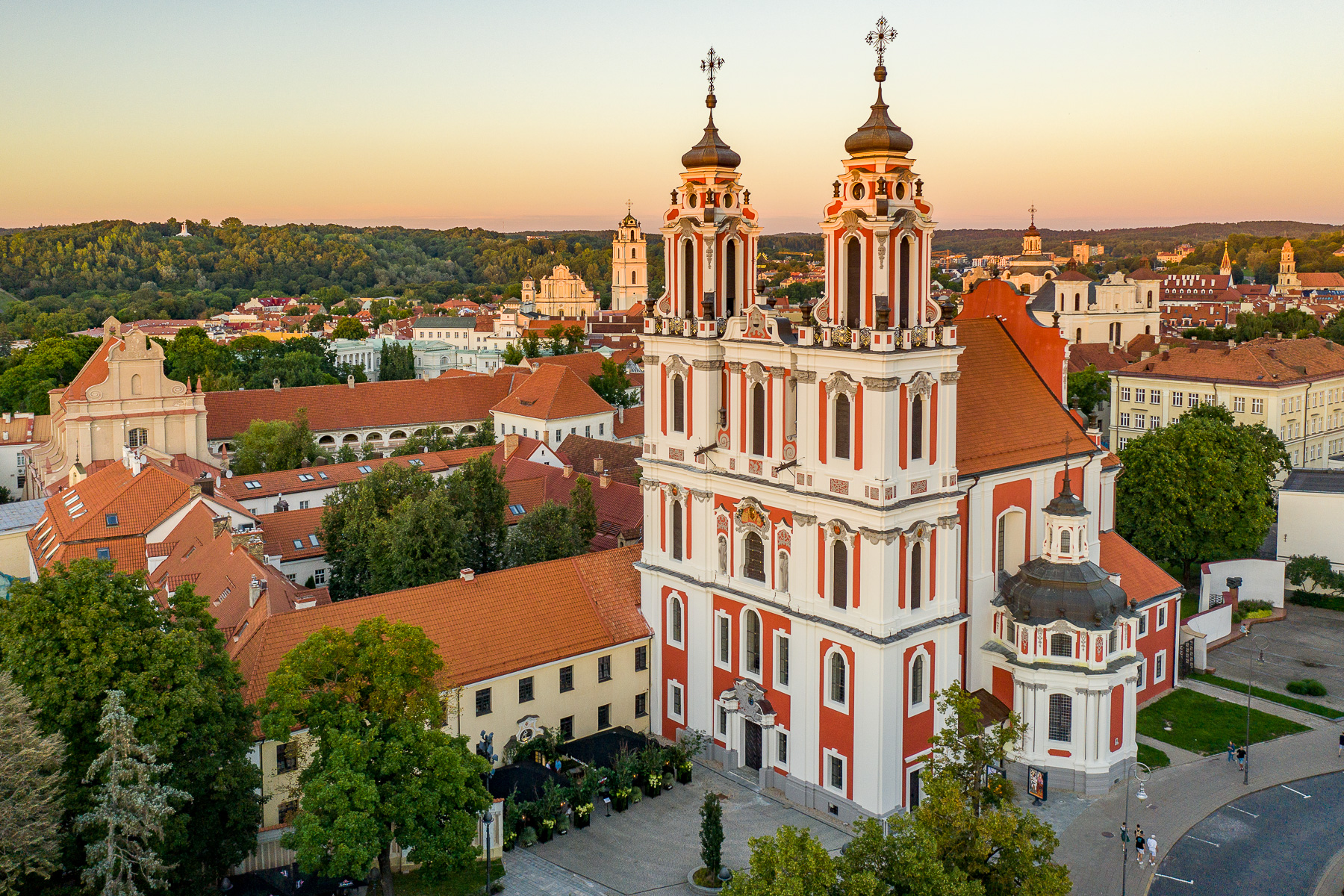
Church of St. Catherine and Church of St. Johns (in the background, centre) are an examples of Vilnian Baroque

Lithuania is known for numerous castles. Some castles have been rebuilt or survive partially. Many Lithuanian nobles' historic palaces and manor houses have remained till the nowadays and were reconstructed. Lithuanian village life has existed since the days of Vytautas the Great. Zervynos and Kapiniškiai are two of many ethnographic villages in Lithuania. Rumšiškės is an open space museum where old ethnographic architecture is preserved.

During the interwar period, Art Deco, Lithuanian National Romanticism architectural style buildings were constructed in the temporary capital Kaunas. Its architecture is regarded as one of the finest examples of the European Art Deco and has received the European Heritage Label.

=== Arts and museums ===
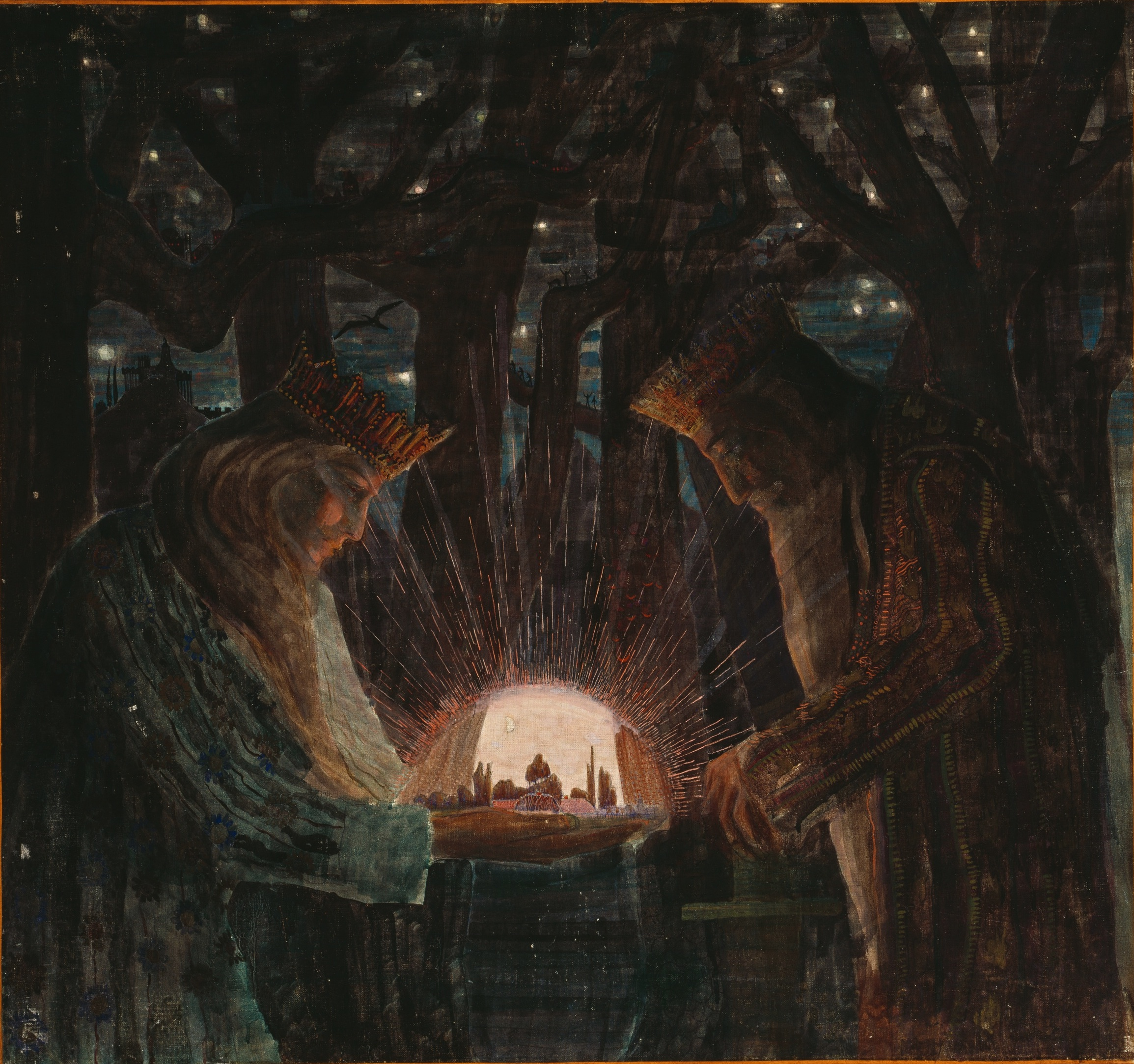
Fairy Tale of the Kings (1908–1909) by Mikalojus Konstantinas Čiurlionis

The Lithuanian Art Museum was founded in 1933 and is the largest museum of art conservation and display in Lithuania. Among other important museums are the Palanga Amber Museum, where amber pieces comprise a major part of the collection, National Gallery of Art, presenting collection of Lithuanian art of the 20th and 21st century, National Museum of Lithuania presenting Lithuanian archaeology, history and ethnic culture. In 2018, two private museums were opened – MO Museum devoted to modern and contemporary Lithuanian art and Tartle, exhibiting a collection of Lithuanian art heritage and artefacts.

Perhaps the most renowned figure in Lithuania's art community was 19th century composer Mikalojus Konstantinas Čiurlionis. The 2420 Čiurlionis asteroid, identified in 1975, honors his achievements. The M. K. Čiurlionis National Art Museum, as well as the only military museum in Lithuania, Vytautas the Great War Museum, are located in Kaunas. Franciszek Smuglewicz, Jan Rustem, Józef Oleszkiewicz and Kanuty Rusiecki are the most prominent Lithuanian painters of the 18th and 19th centuries.

=== Theatre ===
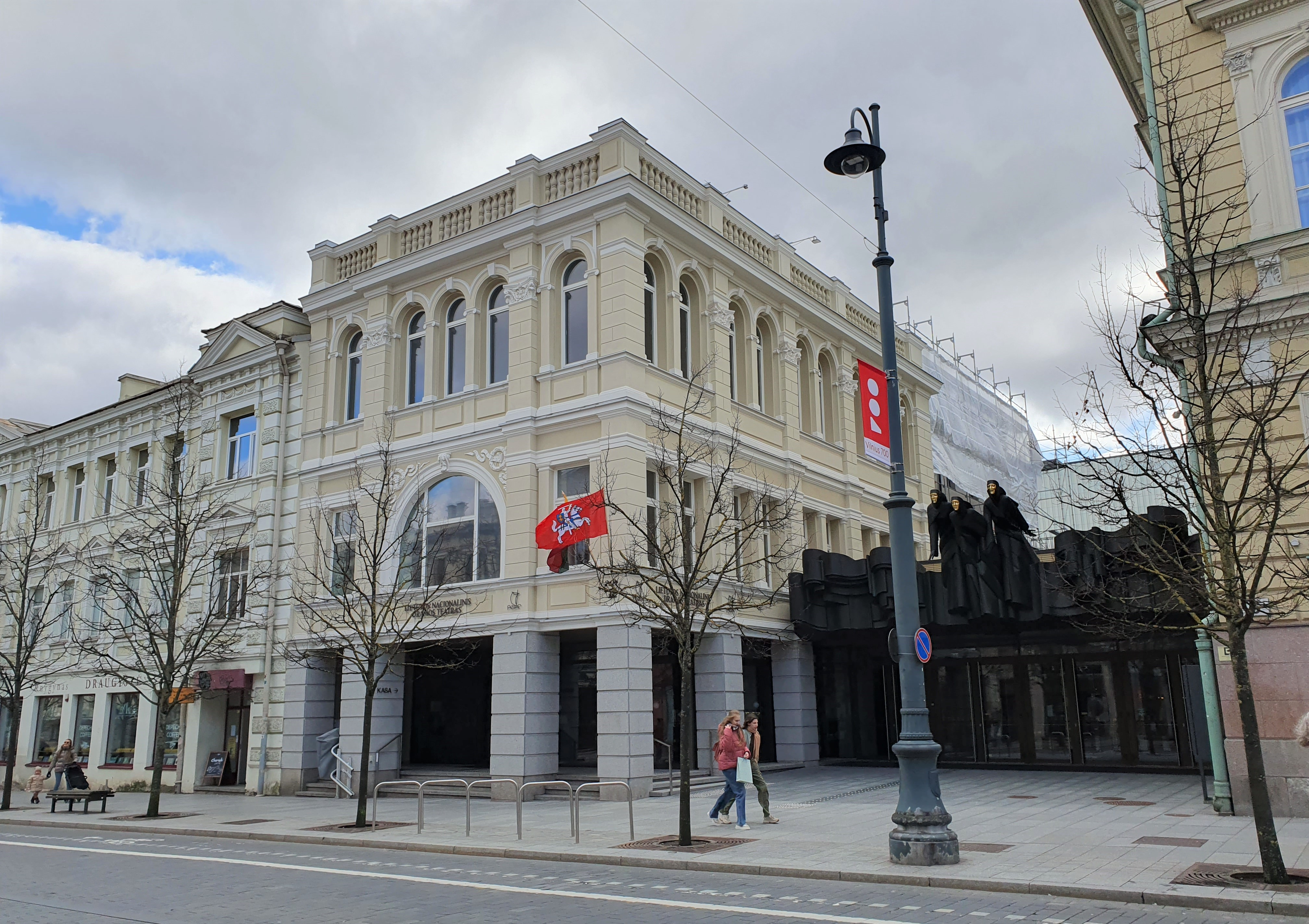
Lithuanian National Drama Theatre

Lithuania has theatres in Vilnius, Kaunas, Klaipėda and Panevėžys. These include Lithuanian National Drama Theatre, Keistuolių teatras (Theatre of Freaks) in Vilnius, Kaunas State Drama Theatre, Theatre of Oskaras Koršunovas, Klaipėda Drama Theatre, Theatre of Gytis Ivanauskas, Miltinis Drama Theatre in Panevėžys, The Doll's Theatre, Old Theatre of Vilnius. Theatre festivals include Sirenos (Sirens), TheATRIUM, Nerk į teatrą (Dive into the Theatre).

Lithuanian theatre directors include Eimuntas Nekrošius, Jonas Vaitkus, Cezaris Graužinis, Gintaras Varnas, Dalia Ibelhauptaitė and Artūras Areima. Actors include Dainius Gavenonis, Rolandas Kazlas, Saulius Balandis and Gabija Jaraminaitė. Theatre director Oskaras Koršunovas was awarded the Swedish Commander Grand Cross – the Order of the Polar Star.

=== Cinema ===
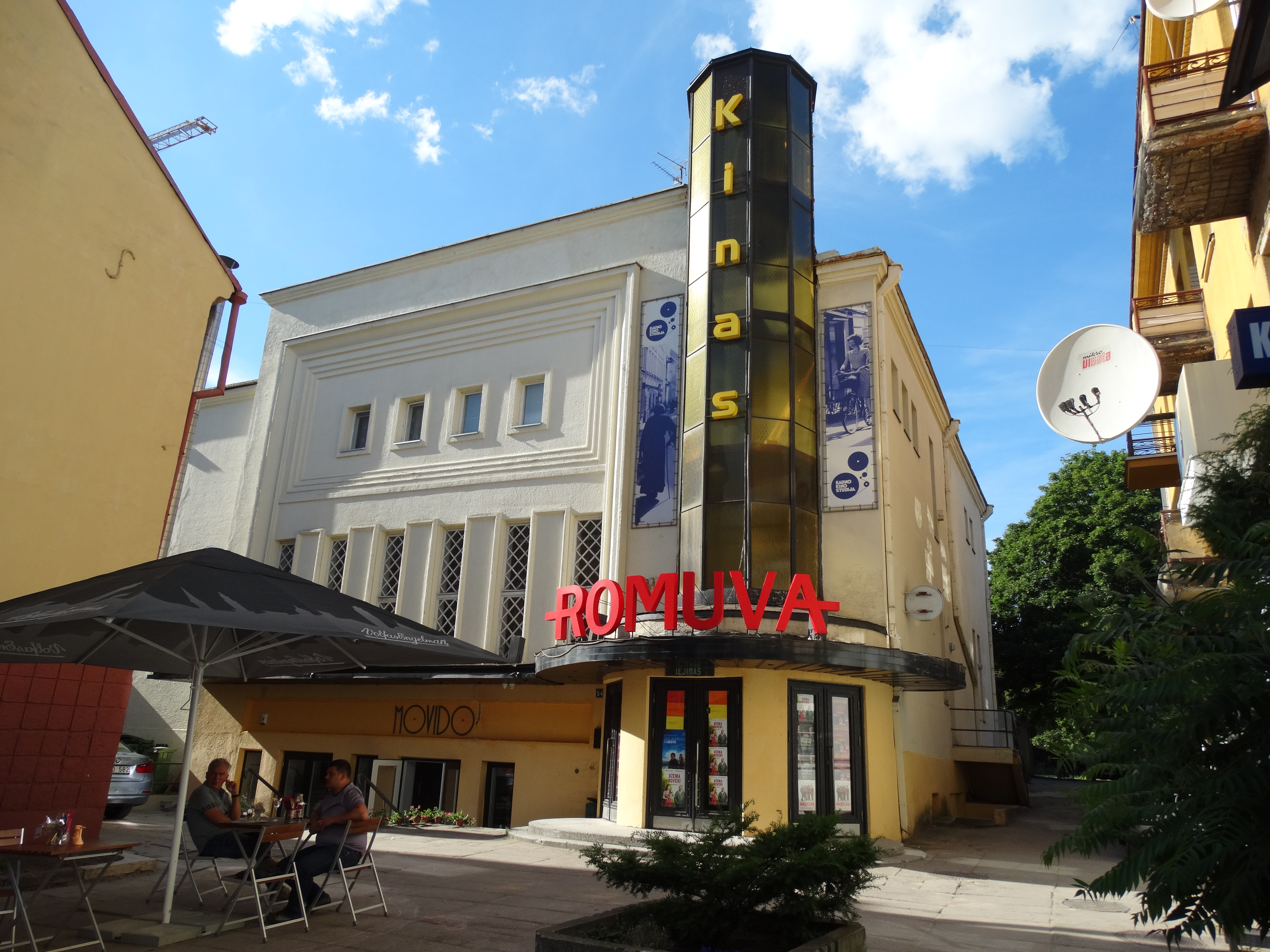
Romuva Cinema, the oldest still operational cinema in Lithuania

On 28 July 1896, Thomas Edison performed a live photography session held in the Concerts Hall of the Botanical Garden of Vilnius University. Similar American movies were available with the addition of special phonograph records that also provided sound. In 1909, Lithuanian cinema pioneers Antanas Račiūnas and Ladislas Starevich released their first movies. Soon the Račiūnas' recordings of Lithuania's views became very popular among the Lithuanian Americans abroad. In 1925, Pranas Valuskis filmed movie Naktis Lietuvoje (Night in Lithuania) about Lithuanian book smugglers that left the first bright Lithuanian footprint in Hollywood. The most significant and mature Lithuanian American movie of the time Aukso žąsis (Golden goose) was created in 1965 by Birutė Pūkelevičiūtė that featured motifs from the Brothers Grimm fairy tales. In 1940, Romuva Cinema was opened in Kaunas and is the oldest operating cinema in Lithuania. After the occupation of the state, movies mostly were used for the Soviet propaganda purposes, nevertheless Almantas Grikevičius, Gytis Lukšas, Henrikas Šablevičius, Arūnas Žebriūnas, Raimondas Vabalas were able to overcome the obstacles and create valuable films. After the restoration of the independence, Šarūnas Bartas, Audrius Stonys, Arūnas Matelis, Audrius Juzėnas, Algimantas Puipa, Janina Lapinskaitė, Dijana and her husband Kornelijus Matuzevičius received success in international movie festivals.

=== Music ===
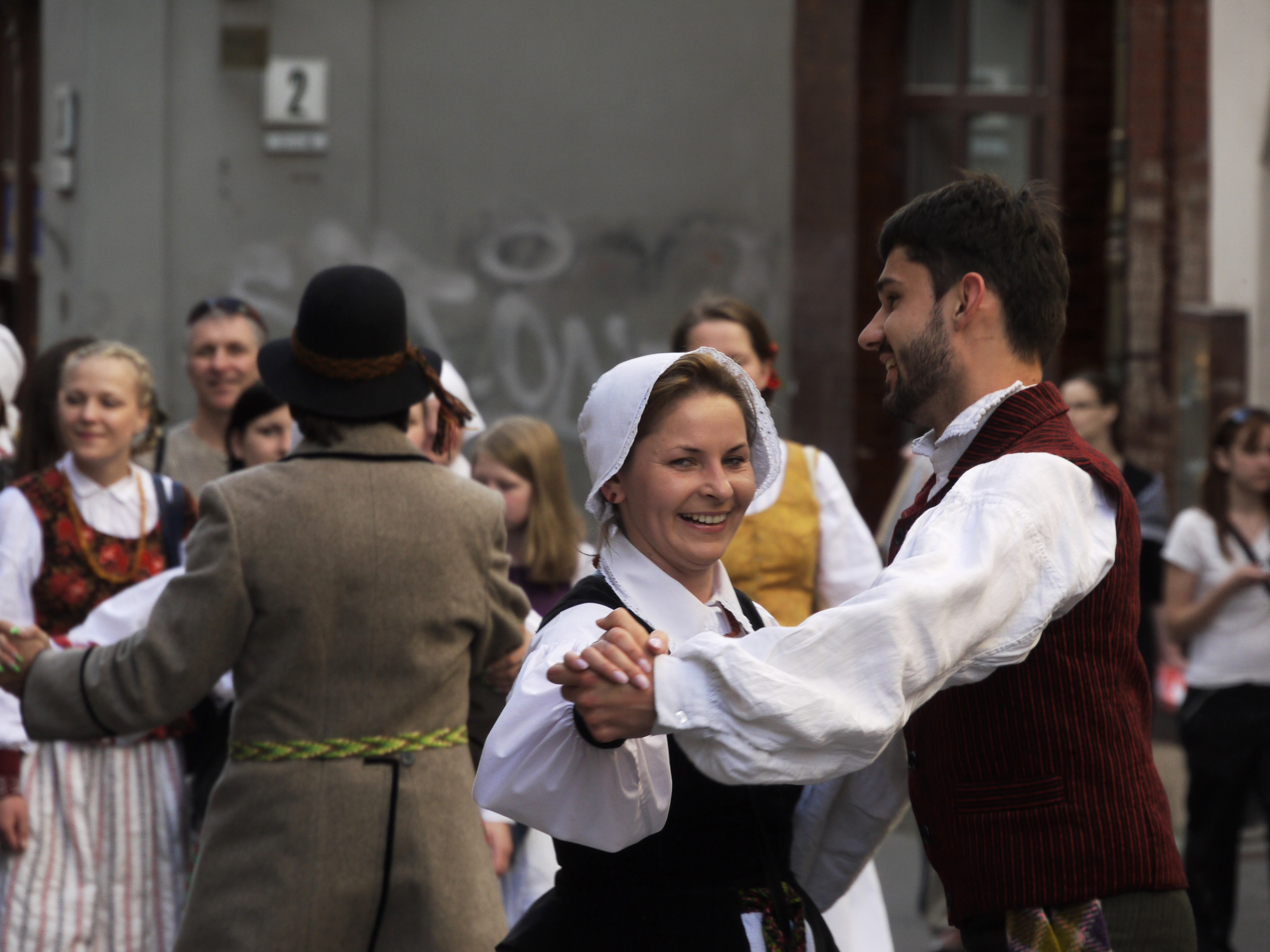
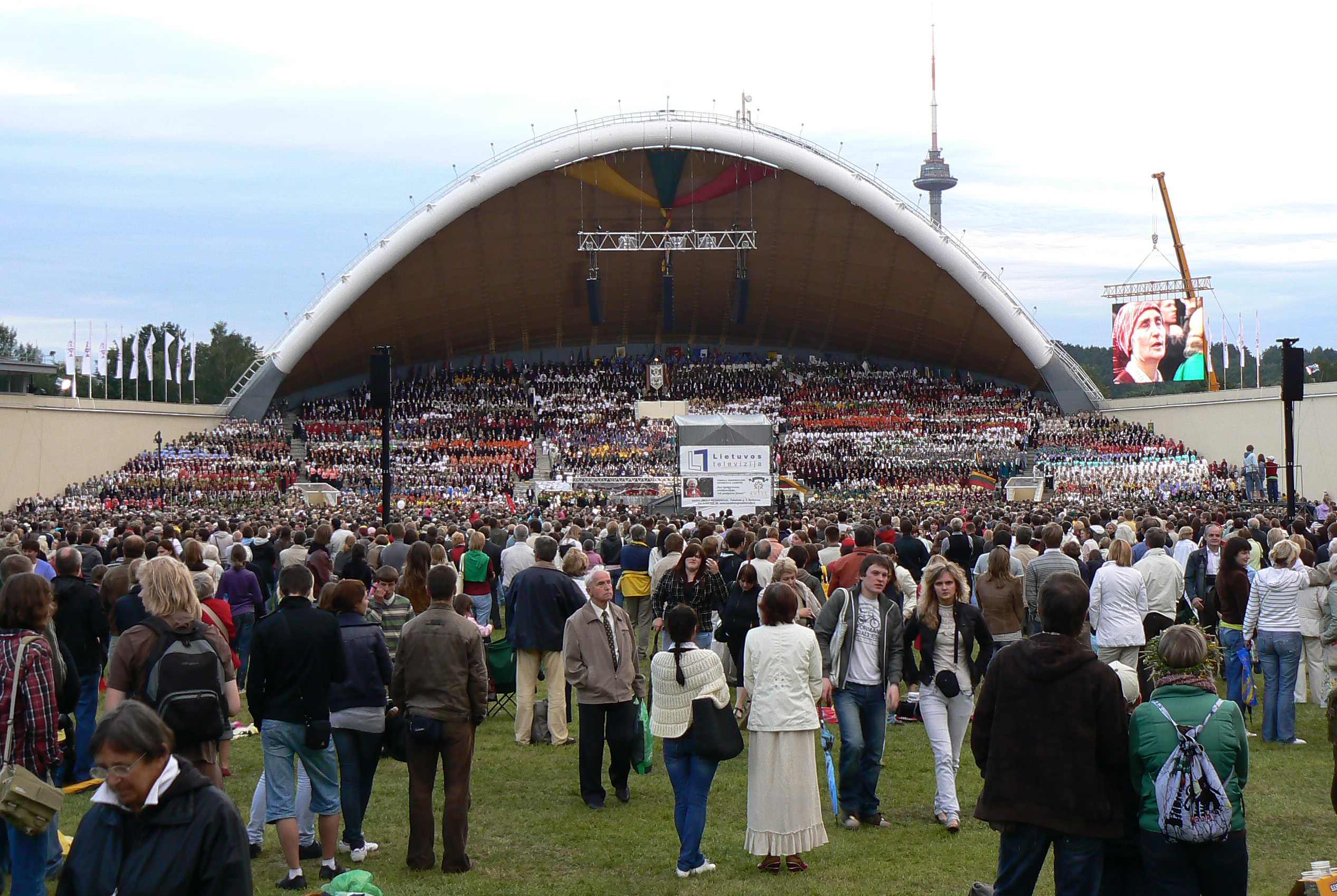
Lithuanians dancing at Skamba skamba kankliai festival and singing at Lithuanian Song and Dance Festival in Vingis Park

Lithuanians are sometimes described as a "singing folk". The choral music traditions are prominent in the country. The long-standing Dainų šventė (Lithuanian Song and Dance Festival) is organised starting from 1924. Since 1990, the festival has been organised every four years and summons roughly 30,000 singers and folk dancers of various professional levels and age groups from across the country. In 2008, Lithuanian Song and Dance Festival together with its Latvian and Estonian versions was inscribed as UNESCO Masterpiece of the Oral and Intangible Heritage of Humanity.

Lithuanian folk music belongs to Baltic music branch which is connected with Neolithic corded ware culture. Two instrument cultures meet in the areas inhabited by Lithuanians: stringed (kanklių) and wind instrument cultures. Lithuanian folk music is archaic, mostly used for ritual purposes, containing elements of paganism faith. There are three ancient styles of singing in Lithuania connected with ethnographical regions: monophony, heterophony and polyphony. Folk song genres: Sutartinės (Multipart Songs), Wedding Songs, War-Historical Time Songs, Calendar Cycle and Ritual Songs and Work Songs.

The musical education and talent screening, especially for high-caliber individuals, is strong and holds an esteemed reputation. Vilnius is the only city with three choirs laureates (Brevis, Jauna Muzika and Chamber Choir of the Conservatoire) at the European Grand Prix for Choral Singing. The biennial children's music festival Dainų dainelė has been organised since 1974, promoting singing traditions among the youth alongside other events such as Laumės juosta. Gatvės muzikos diena (Street Music Day) gathers musicians of various genres annually. Music Information Centre Lithuania collects, promotes and shares information on Lithuanian musical culture.

Italian artists organised the first opera in Lithuania in 1636 at the Palace of the Grand Dukes by the order of Władysław IV Vasa. Operas are staged at the Lithuanian National Opera and Ballet Theatre and also by independent troupe Vilnius City Opera. State also supports two full-time musical theatres of Kaunas and Klaipėda. After the restoration of independence, a lot of Lithuanian opera artists, such as Virgilijus Noreika, Violeta Urmana, Vytautas Juozapaitis, Asmik Grigorian, Sigutė Stonytė, etc. achieved international recognition and leading roles in the world's top theatres, while concurrently Dalia Ibelhauptaitė earned acclaim as a director. According to Financial Times, roughly 20 Lithuanian top tier professionals are performing internationally per season.

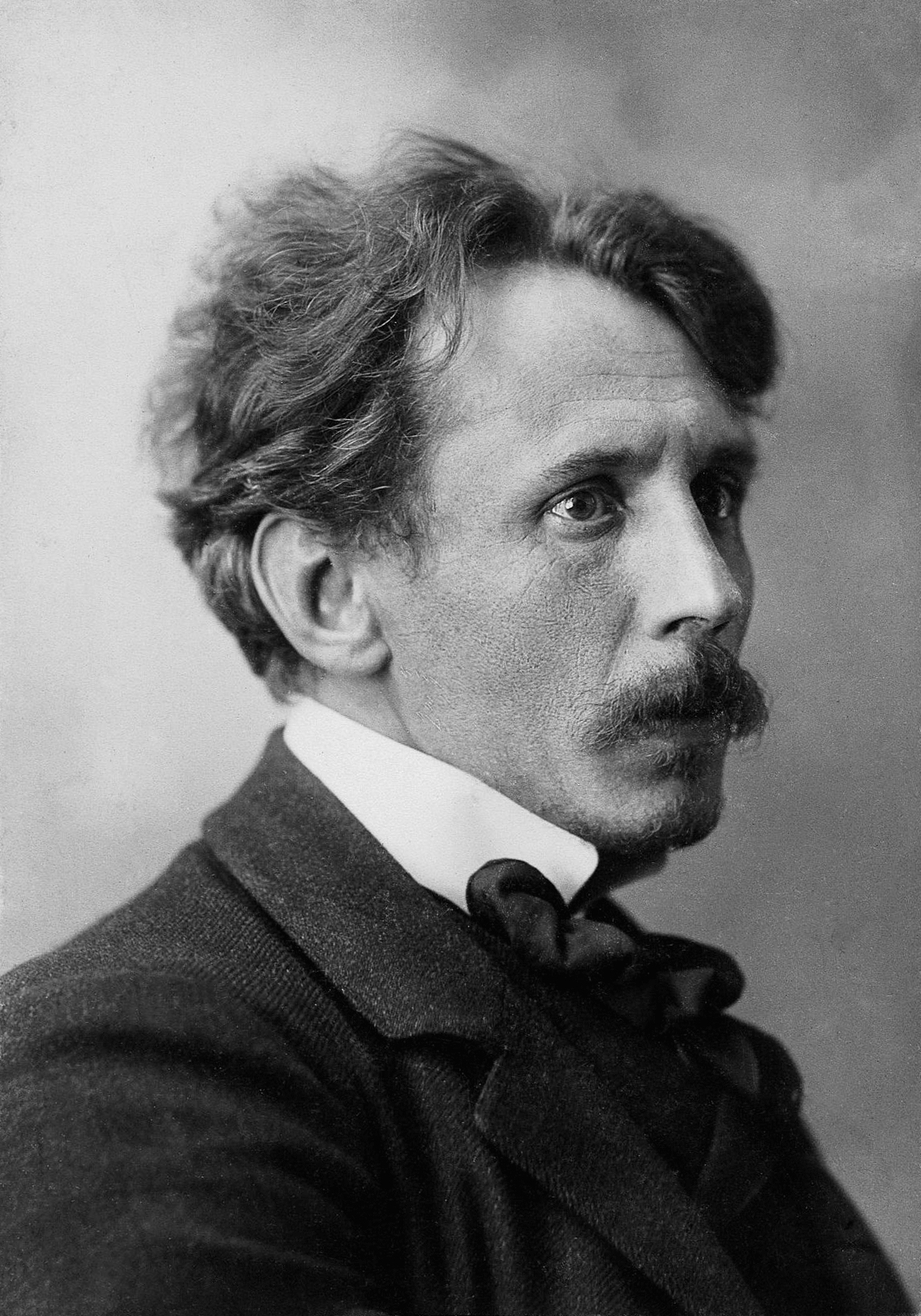
Painter and composer M.K. Čiurlionis

Mikalojus Konstantinas Čiurlionis was a Lithuanian painter and composer. During his short life he created about 200 pieces of music. His works have influenced modern Lithuanian culture. His symphonic poems In the Forest (Miške) and The Sea (Jūra) were performed only posthumously. Čiurlionis contributed to symbolism and art nouveau and was representative of the fin de siècle epoch. He has been considered one of the pioneers of abstract art in Europe. The nations arts academy is named after him.

Modern classical composers emerged in 1970s – Bronius Kutavičius, Feliksas Bajoras, Osvaldas Balakauskas, Onutė Narbutaitė, Vidmantas Bartulis and others. Most of those composers explored archaic Lithuanian music and its harmonic combination with modern minimalism and neoromanticism. Jazz scene was active even during the years of Soviet occupation. In 1970–71 the Ganelin/Tarasov/Chekasin trio established the Vilnius Jazz School. Most known annual events are Vilnius Jazz Festival, Kaunas Jazz, Birštonas Jazz.

==== Rock and protest music ====
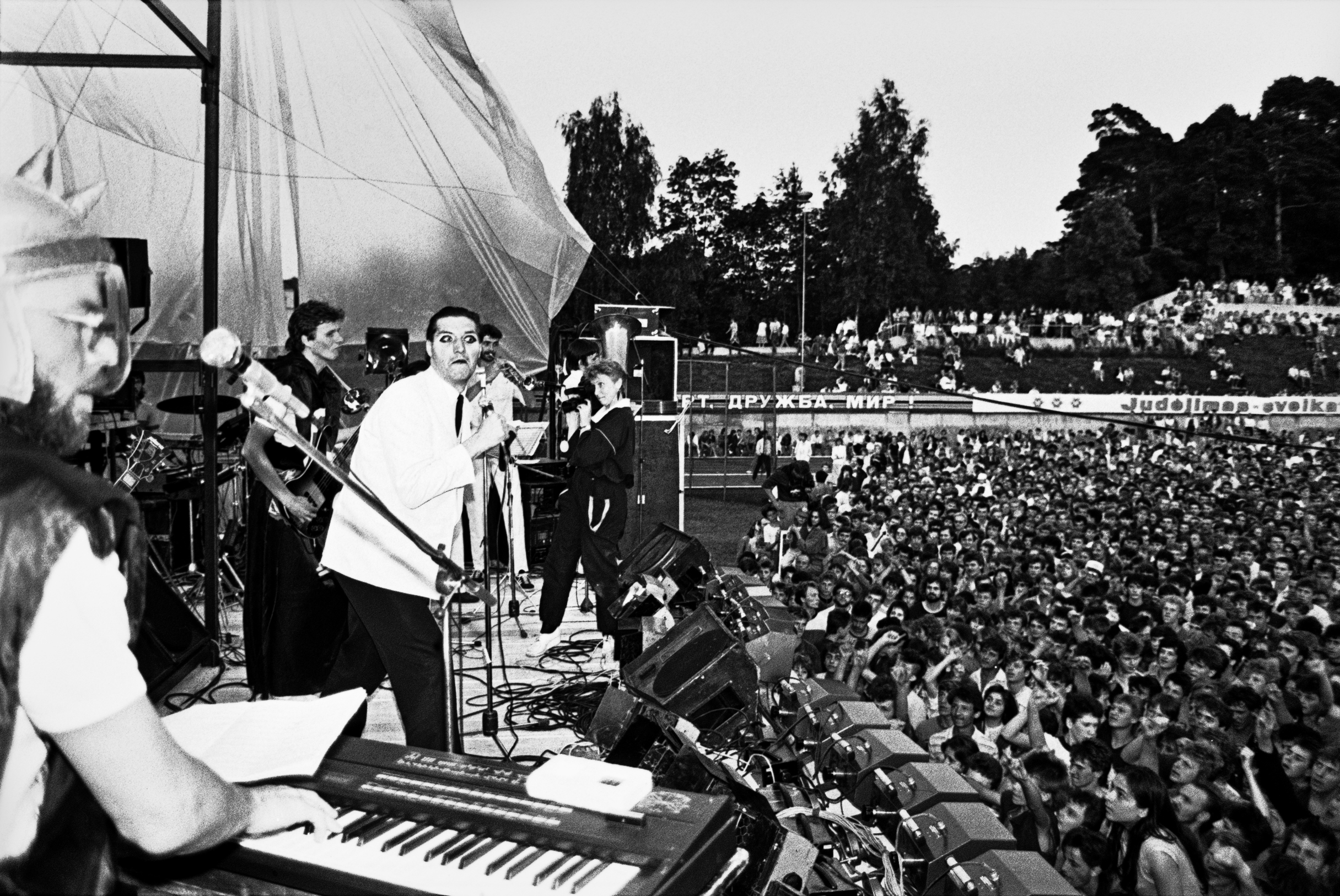
Rock band Antis, which under firm censorship actively mocked the Soviet Union regime by using metaphors in their lyrics, during an anti-Sovietism, anti-communism concert in 1987

After the Soviet reoccupation of Lithuania in 1944, the Soviet's censorship continued firmly controlling all artistic expressions in Lithuania, and any violations by criticising the regime would immediately result in punishments. The first local rock bands started to emerge around 1965 and included Kertukai, Aitvarai and Nuogi ant slenksčio in Kaunas, and Kęstutis Antanėlis, Vienuoliai, and Gėlių Vaikai in Vilnius, among others. Unable to express their opinions directly, the Lithuanian artists began organising patriotic Roko Maršai and were using metaphors in their songs' lyrics, which were easily identified for their true meanings by the locals. Postmodernist rock band Antis and its vocalist Algirdas Kaušpėdas were one of the most active performers who mocked the Soviet regime by using metaphors. For example, in the song Zombiai (Zombies), the band indirectly sang about the Red Army soldiers who occupied the state and its military base in Ukmergė. Vytautas Kernagis' song Kolorado vabalai (Colorado beetles) was also a favourite due to its lyrics in which true meaning of the Colorado beetles was intended to be the Soviets decorated with the Ribbons of Saint George.

In the early independence years, rock band Foje was particularly popular and gathered tens of thousands of spectators to the concerts. After disbanding in 1997, Foje vocalist Andrius Mamontovas remained one of the most prominent Lithuanian performers and an active participant in various charity events. Marijonas Mikutavičius is famous for creating unofficial Lithuania sport anthem Trys milijonai (Three millions) and official anthem of the EuroBasket 2011 Nebetyli sirgaliai (English version was named Celebrate Basketball).

=== Cuisine ===
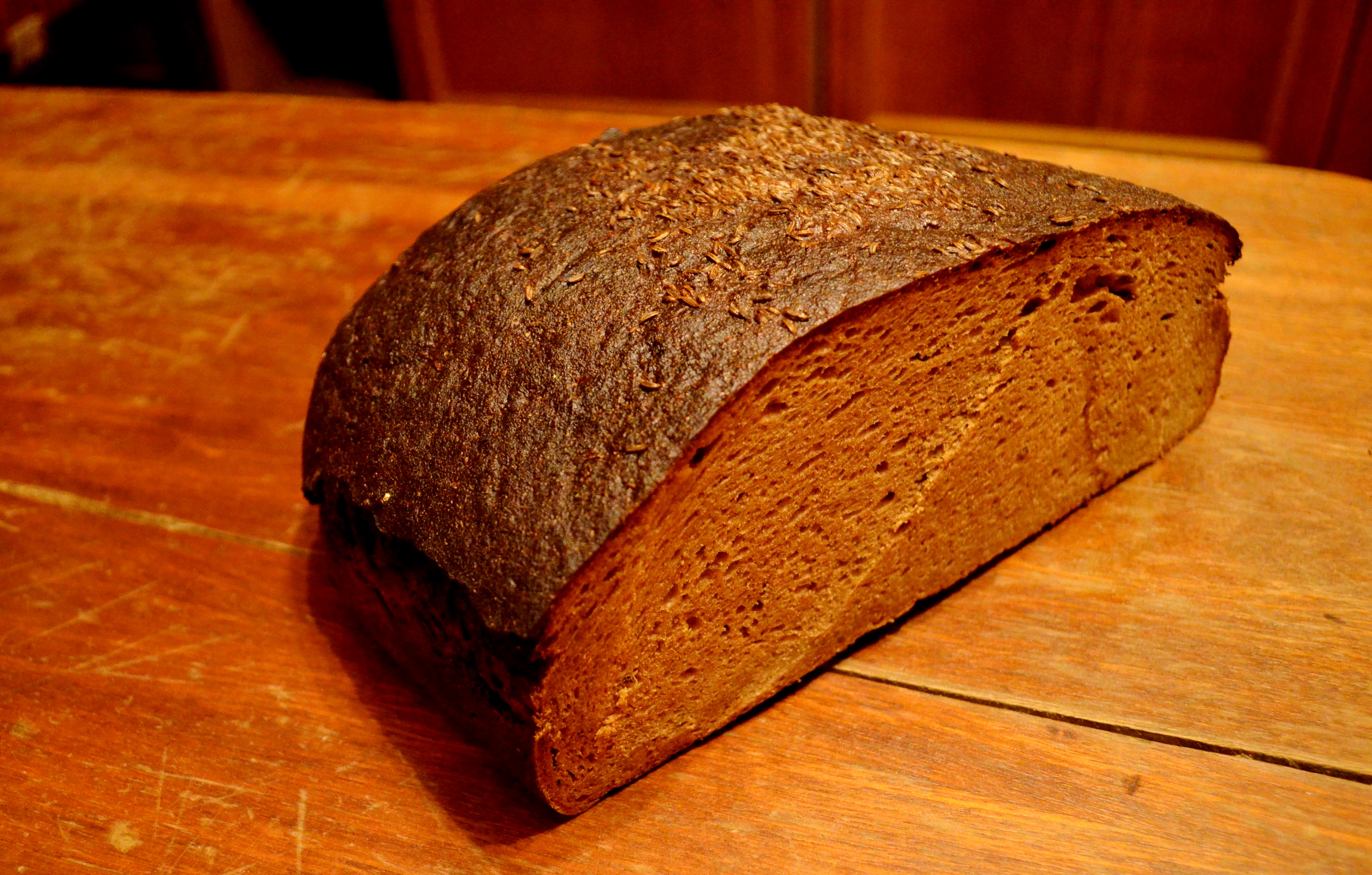
Lithuanian dark rye bread

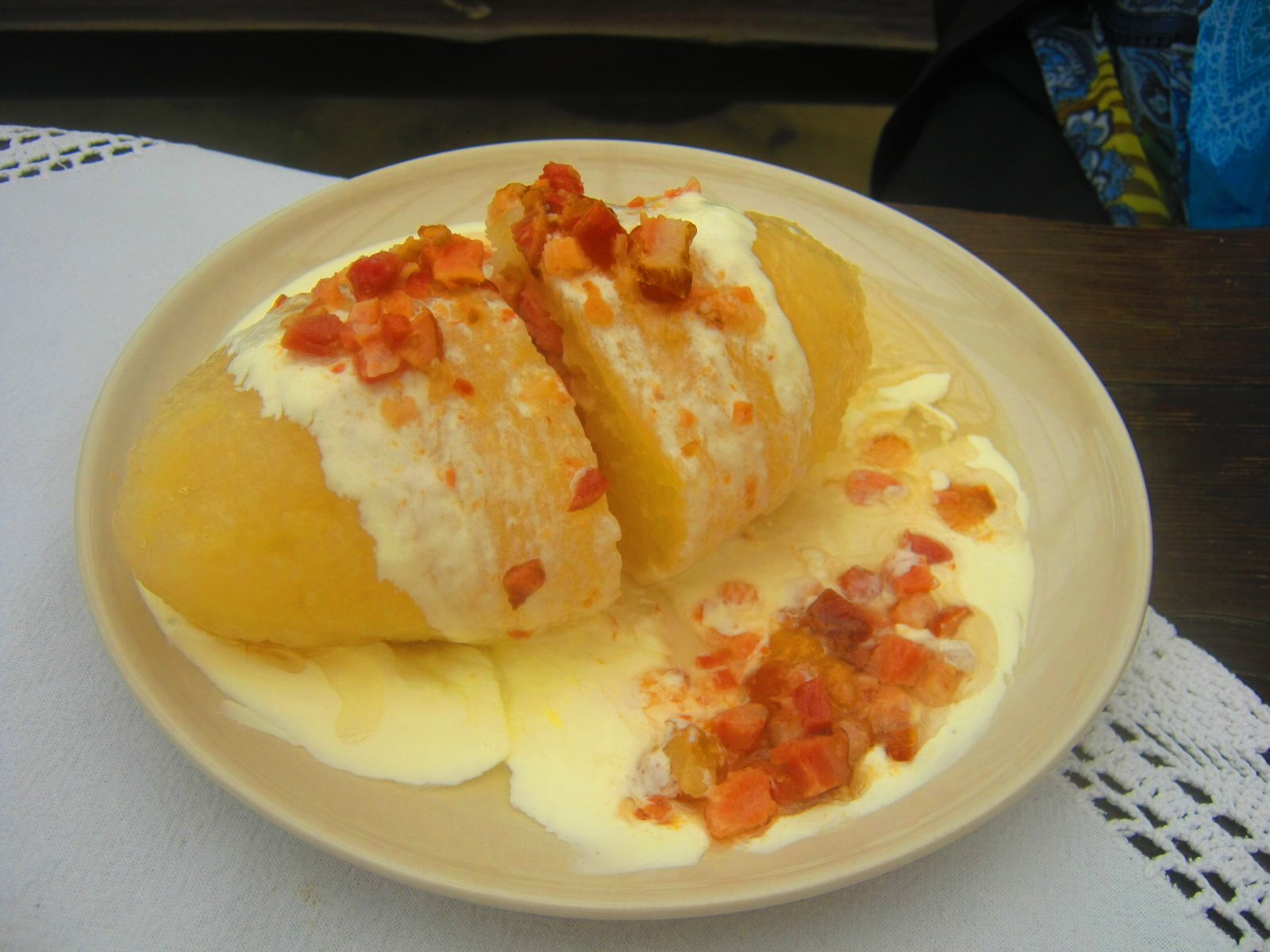
Cepelinai, a potato-based dumpling dish characteristic of Lithuanian cuisine with meat, curd or mushrooms

Lithuanian cuisine features the products suited to the cool and moist northern climate of Lithuania: barley, potatoes, rye, beets, greens, berries, and mushrooms are locally grown, and dairy products are one of its specialties. Fish dishes are very popular in the coastal region. Since it shares its climate and agricultural practices with Northern Europe, Lithuanian cuisine has some similarities to Scandinavian cuisine. Nevertheless, it has its own distinguishing features, which were formed by a variety of influences during the country's long and difficult history.

Dairy products include white cottage cheese (varškės sūris), curd (varškė), soured milk (rūgpienis), sour cream (grietinė), butter (sviestas), and sour cream butter kastinis. Traditional meat products are usually seasoned, matured and smoked – smoked sausages (dešros), lard (lašiniai), skilandis, smoked ham (kumpis). Soups (sriubos)—boletus soup (baravykų sriuba), cabbage soup (kopūstų sriuba), beer soup (alaus sriuba), milk soup (pieniška sriuba), cold-beet soup (šaltibarščiai)—and various kinds of porridges (košės) are part of tradition and daily diet. Freshwater fish, herring, wild berries and mushrooms, honey are highly popular diet to this day.

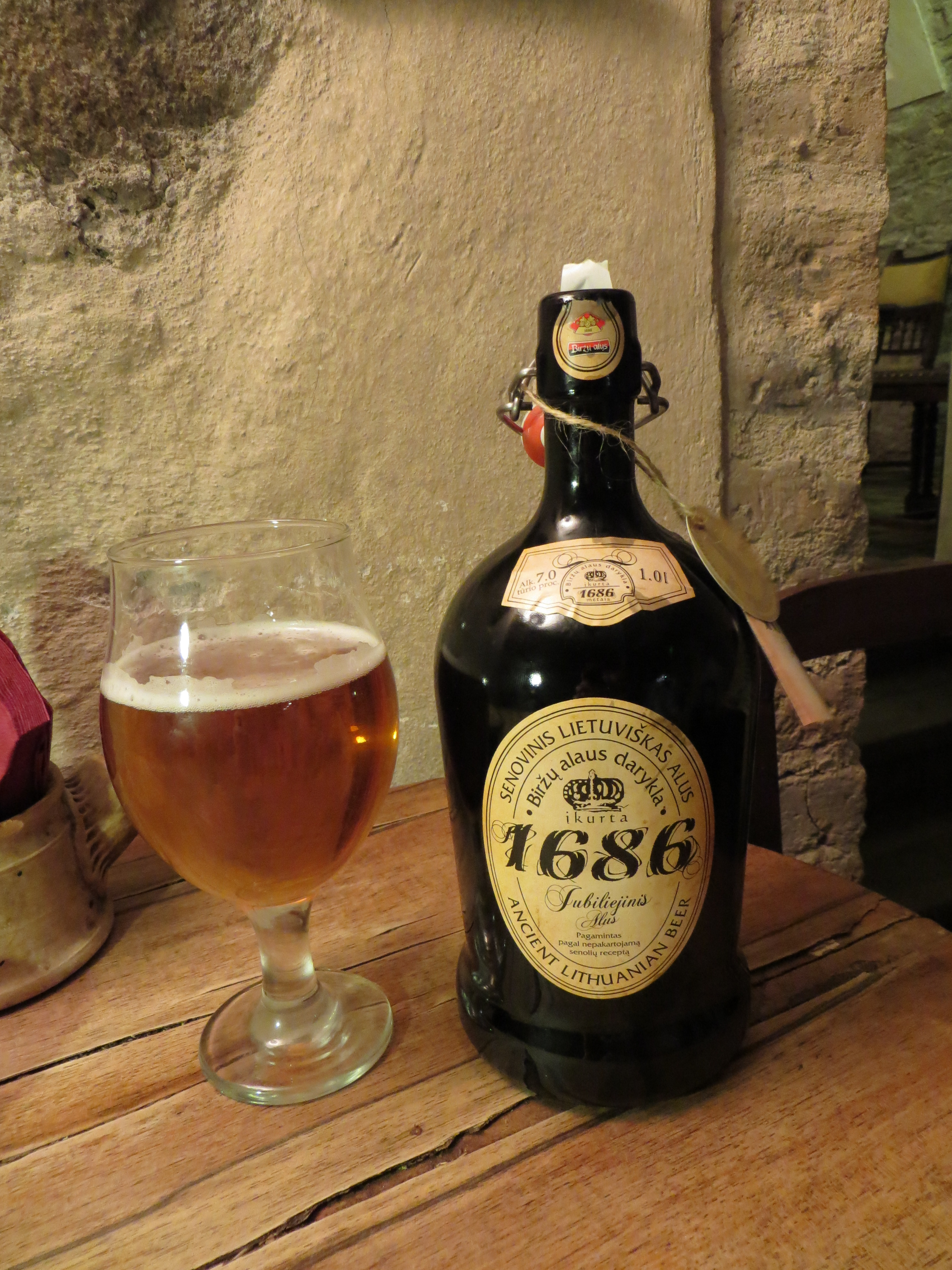
Lithuania has longlasting beer brewing traditions.

One of the oldest and most fundamental food products is rye bread. Rye bread is eaten every day for breakfast, lunch and dinner. Bread played an important role in family rituals and agrarian ceremonies.

Lithuanians and other nations that once formed part of the Grand Duchy of Lithuania share many dishes and beverages. German traditions also influenced Lithuanian cuisine, introducing pork and potato dishes, such as potato pudding (kugelis or kugel) and potato sausages (vėdarai), as well as the baroque tree cake known as Šakotis. The most exotic of all the influences is Eastern (Karaite) cuisine – the kibinai are popular in Lithuania. Noblemen usually hired French chefs, so French cuisine influence came to Lithuania in this way.

Balts were using mead (midus) for thousands of years. Beer (alus) is the most common alcoholic beverage. Lithuania has a long farmhouse beer tradition, first mentioned in 11th century chronicles. Beer was brewed for ancient Baltic festivities and rituals. Farmhouse brewing survived to a greater extent in Lithuania than anywhere else, and through accidents of history the Lithuanians then developed a commercial brewing culture from their unique farmhouse traditions. Lithuania is top 5 by consumption of beer per capita in Europe in 2015, counting 75 active breweries, 32 of them are microbreweries.

Eight Lithuanian restaurants are listed in the White Guide Baltic Top 30. The local "30 geriausių restoranų" guide lists top domestic places, and Lithuanian restaurants appear in the 2024 Michelin Guide.

=== Media ===
The constitution provides for freedom of speech and press, and the government generally respects these rights in practice. An independent press, an effective judiciary, and a functioning democratic political system combine to promote these freedoms. However, the constitutional definition of freedom of expression does not protect certain acts, such as incitement to national, racial, religious, or social hatred, violence and discrimination, or slander, and disinformation. It is a crime to deny or "grossly trivialise" Soviet or Nazi German crimes against Lithuania or its citizens, or to deny genocide, crimes against humanity, or war crimes.

In 2021, the best-selling daily national newspapers were Lietuvos rytas (5.4% of all weekly readers), Vakaro žinios (3.2%), Kauno diena (2.9%). Best-selling weekly newspapers were Savaitė (16.5%), Žmonės (8.4%), Prie kavos (4.1%), Savaitgalis (3.9%) and Verslo žinios (3.2%). In 2021, the most popular national television channels were TV3 (34.6% of the daily audience), LNK (32.3%), Lithuanian National Radio and Television (31.6%), BTV (17.3%), Lietuvos rytas TV (16.2%), TV6 (15.3%). The most popular radio stations were M-1 (14.5% of daily listeners), Lietus (12.7%), Radiocentras (9.1%) and LRT Radijas (8.5%).

=== Public holidays and festivals ===
As a result of a thousand-years history, Lithuania has two national days. The first one is the Statehood Day on 6 July, marking the establishment of the medieval Kingdom of Lithuania in 1253. The creation of modern Lithuanian state is commemorated on 16 February as a Lithuanian State Reestablishment Day on which independence from Russia and Germany was declared in 1918. Joninės (previously known as Rasos) is a public holiday with pagan roots that celebrates a solstice. There are 13 public holidays (which come with a day off).

Kaziuko mugė is an annual fair held since the beginning of the 17th century that commemorates the anniversary of Saint Casimir's death and gathers thousands of visitors and many craftsmen. Other notable festivals are Vilnius International Film Festival, Kauno Miesto Diena, Klaipėda Sea Festival, Mados infekcija, Vilnius Book Fair, Vilnius Marathon, Devilstone Open Air, Apuolė 854, Great Žemaičių Kalvarija Festival.

Public holidays in Lithuania
Date	English name	Local name	Remarks
1 January	New Year's Day	Naujųjų metų diena	
16 February	Day of Restoration of the State of Lithuania (1918)	Lietuvos valstybės atkūrimo diena	
11 March	Day of Restoration of Independence of Lithuania (1990)	Lietuvos nepriklausomybės atkūrimo diena	
Moveable Sunday	Easter Sunday	Velykos	Commemorates the resurrection of Jesus. The first Sunday after the full moon that occurs on or next after 21 March.
The day after Easter Sunday	Easter Monday	Antroji Velykų diena	
1 May	International Workers' Day	Tarptautinė darbo diena	
First Sunday in May	Mother's Day	Motinos diena	
First Sunday in June	Father's Day	Tėvo diena	
24 June	St. John's Day / Day of Dew	Joninės / Rasos	Celebrated according to mostly pagan traditions (Midsummer Day, Saint Jonas Day).
6 July	Statehood Day	Valstybės (Lietuvos karaliaus Mindaugo karūnavimo) ir Tautiškos giesmės diena	Celebrates the 1253 coronation of Mindaugas, the first King of Lithuania, and the national anthem of Lithuania.
15 August	Assumption Day	Žolinė (Švenčiausios Mergelės Marijos ėmimo į dangų diena)	Also marked according to pagan traditions, celebrating the goddess Žemyna and noting the mid-August as the middle between summer and autumn.
1 November	All Saints' Day	Visų šventųjų diena	Halloween is increasingly popular and is also informally celebrated on the eve (31 October).
2 November	All Souls' Day	Mirusiųjų atminimo (Vėlinių) diena	
24 December	Christmas Eve	Kūčios	
25 and 26 December	Christmas	Kalėdos	Commemorates the birth of Jesus.

=== Sports ===
Basketball is the most popular and national sport of Lithuania. The national basketball team has won the EuroBasket on three occasions (1937, 1939 and 2003), as well as 8 other medals in the Eurobasket, the World Championships and the Olympic Games. 76% of the population watched the men's national team games live in 2014. Lithuania hosted the Eurobasket in 1939 and 2011. The historic basketball team BC Žalgiris, from Kaunas, won the European basketball league Euroleague in 1999. Lithuania has produced a number of NBA players, including Naismith Memorial Basketball Hall of Fame inductees Arvydas Sabonis and Šarūnas Marčiulionis, and current NBA players Domantas Sabonis, Matas Buzelis and Kasparas Jakučionis.

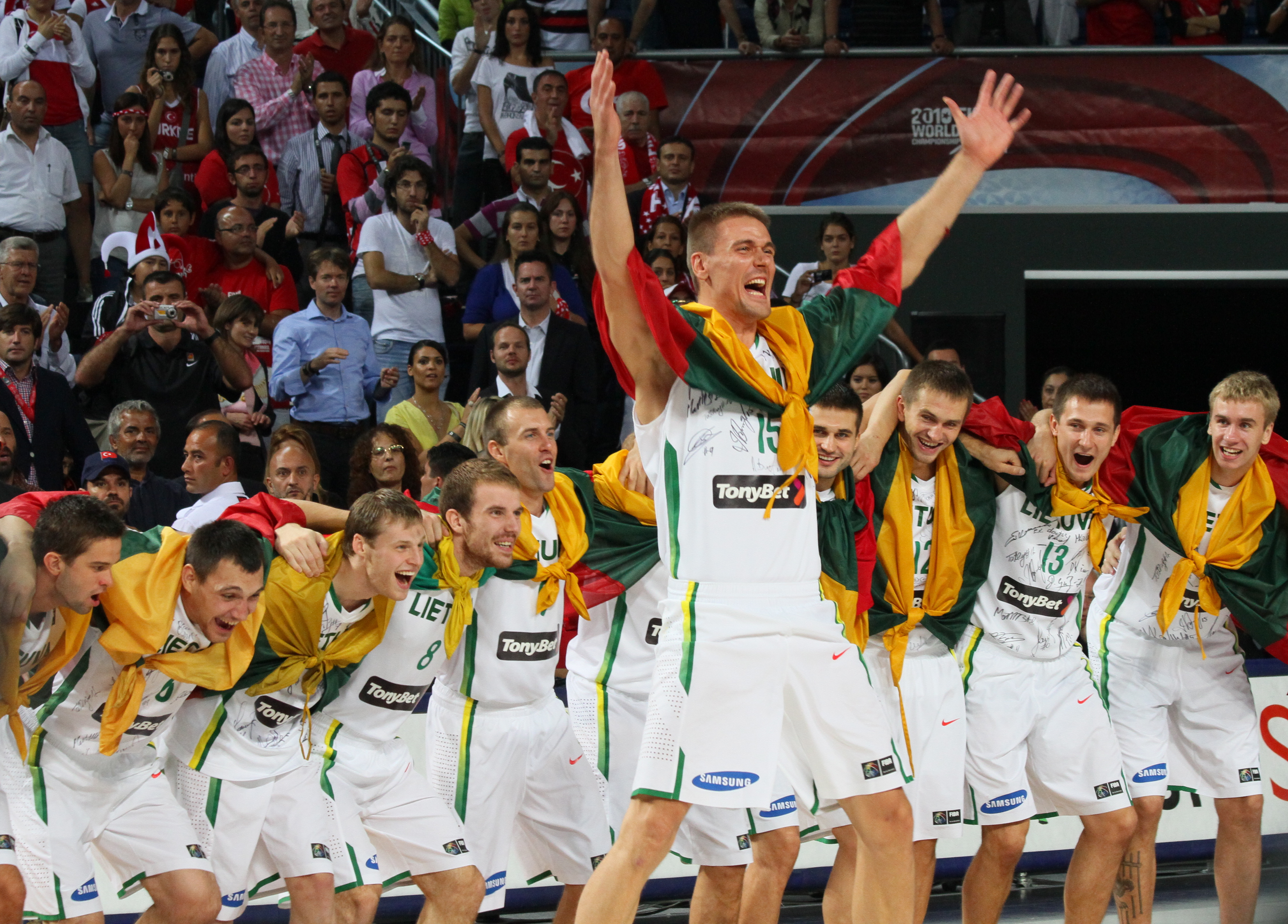
Lithuania men's national basketball team is ranked 10th worldwide in FIBA Rankings.

Lithuania has won a total of 26 medals at the Olympic Games, including 6 gold medals in athletics, modern pentathlon, shooting, and swimming. Other Lithuanians won Olympic medals representing Soviet Union. Discus thrower Virgilijus Alekna is the most successful Olympic athlete of independent Lithuania, having won gold medals in the 2000 Sydney and 2004 Athens games, as well as a bronze in 2008 in Beijing and numerous World Championship medals. A gold medal was won by 15-year-old swimmer Rūta Meilutytė at the 2012 London Olympics.

Lithuania hosted the 2021 FIFA Futsal World Cup, the first time Lithuania had hosted a FIFA tournament.

Few Lithuanian athletes have found success in winter sports, although facilities are provided by several ice rinks and skiing slopes, including Snow Arena, the first indoor ski slope in the Baltics. In 2018 Lithuania men's national ice hockey team won gold medals at the 2018 IIHF World Championship Division I.

== See also ==
- Outline of Lithuania
