= Outline of Lithuania =

Country in the Baltic region in Northern Europe

The Flag of Lithuania

The Coat of arms of Lithuania

The location of Lithuania

The following outline is provided as an overview of and topical guide to Lithuania:

Lithuania – sovereign country located in the Baltic region of Europe. Situated along the south-eastern shore of the Baltic Sea, sharing borders with Latvia to the north, Belarus to the southeast, Poland, and the Russian exclave of the Kaliningrad Oblast to the southwest. Lithuania is a member of NATO, OECD and the European Union. Its population is about 2.8 million. The largest city and capital is Vilnius.

During the 14th century, Lithuania was the largest country in Europe, as present-day Belarus, Ukraine, and parts of Poland and Russia were territories of the Grand Duchy of Lithuania. With the Lublin Union of 1569 Poland and Lithuania formed a new state: the Polish–Lithuanian Commonwealth, which was finally destroyed by its neighboring countries in 1795. Most of Lithuania's territory was annexed by the Russian Empire, until the Act of Independence was signed on 16 February 1918, which declared the re-establishment of a sovereign state. Between 1940 and 1945 Lithuania was occupied by both the Soviet Union and Nazi Germany at different times. When World War II was near its end in 1944 and the Nazis retreated, the Soviet Union reoccupied Lithuania. On 11 March 1990, Lithuania became the first Baltic republic to declare its restored independence after 50 years of Soviet occupation. Lithuania became a full member of the Schengen Agreement on 21 December 2007. In 2009, Lithuania celebrated the millennium of its name.

The Lithuanians are a Baltic people closely related to the Latvians, with the Lithuanian language sharing many similarities to Latvian. Today the Latvians and Lithuanians are the only surviving members of the Baltic peoples and Baltic languages of the Indo-European family.

== General reference ==
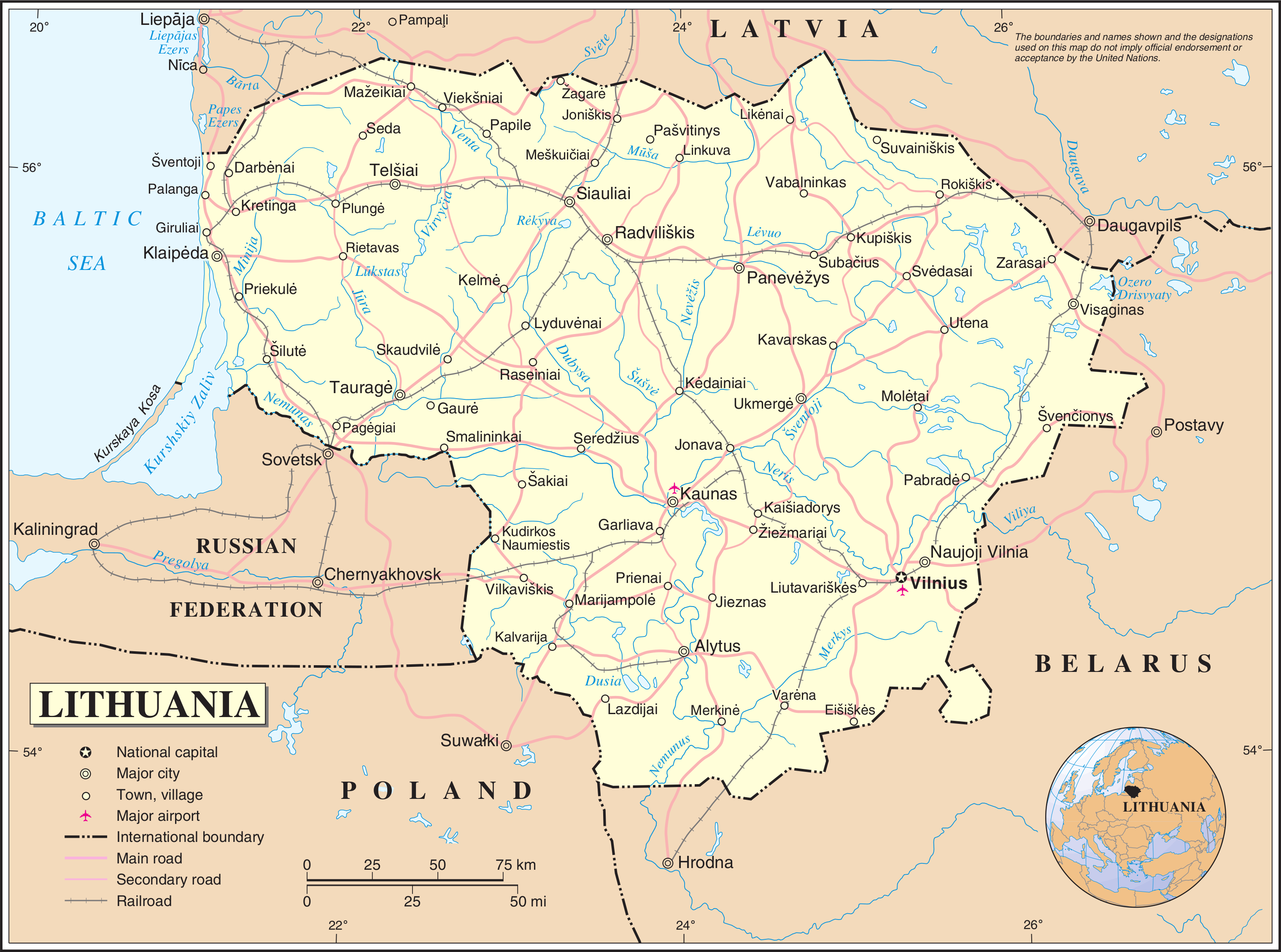
An enlargeable map of the Republic of Lithuania

- Pronunciation: /ˌlɪθjuˈeɪniə/ LITH-ew-AY-nee-ə
- Common English country name: Lithuania
- Official English country name: The Republic of Lithuania
- Common endonym: Lietuva
- Official endonym: Lietuvos Respublika
- Adjectival(s): Lithuanian
- Demonym(s): Lithuanians
- Etymology: Name of Lithuania
- International rankings of Lithuania
- ISO country codes: LT, LTU, 440
- ISO region codes: See ISO 3166-2:LT
- Internet country code top-level domain: .lt

== Geography of Lithuania ==
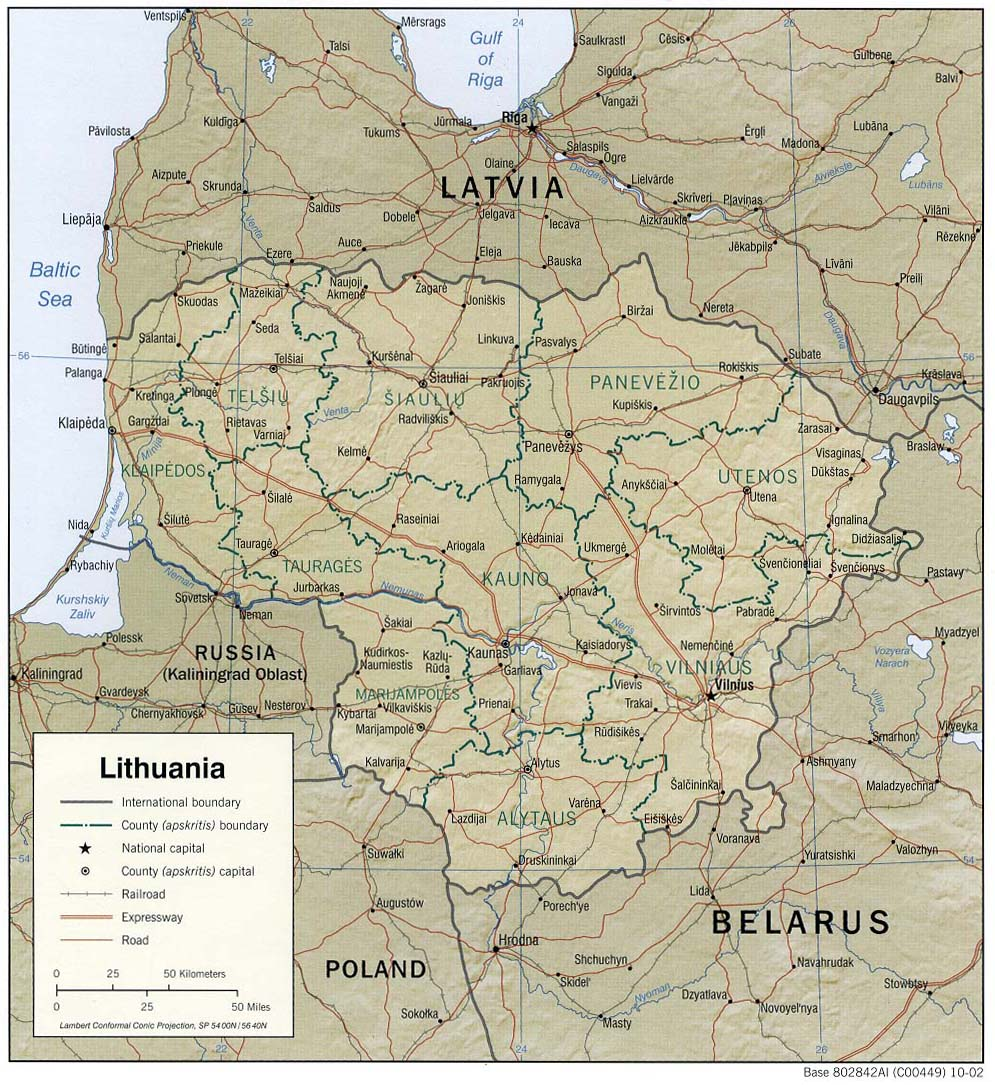
An enlargeable relief map of Lithuania

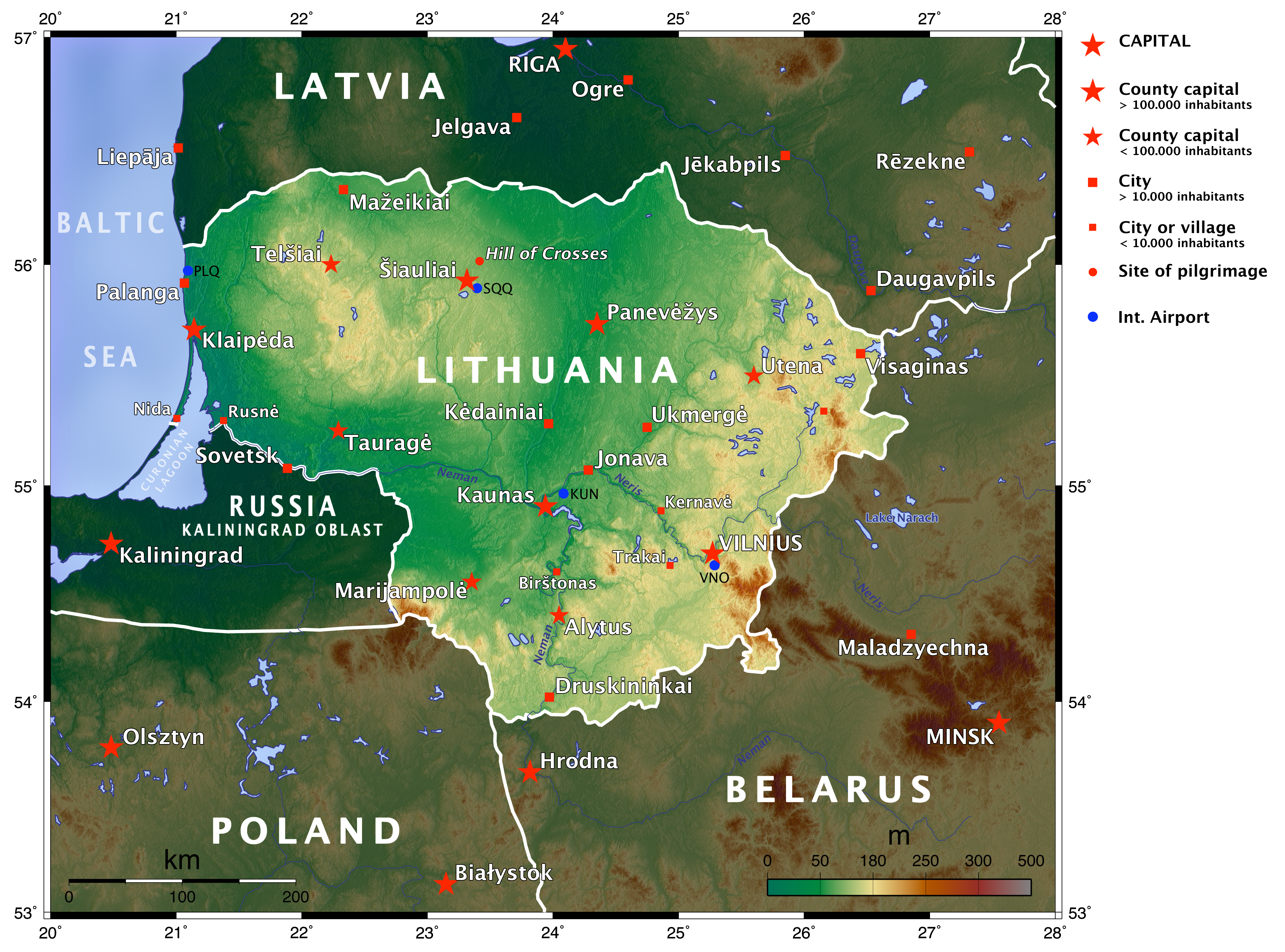
An enlargeable topographic map of Lithuania

Geography of Lithuania

- Lithuania is: a country
- Location:
  - Northern Hemisphere and Eastern Hemisphere
  - Eurasia
    - Europe
      - Northern Europe
      - Eastern Europe
  - Time zone: Eastern European Time (UTC+02), Eastern European Summer Time (UTC+03)
  - Extreme points of Lithuania
    - High: Aukštojas Hill 294 m (965 ft)
    - Low: Nemunas delta −1.3 m (−4 ft)
  - Land boundaries: 1,574 km

Belarus 680 km
Latvia 576 km
Russia 227 km
Poland 91 km

- Coastline: Baltic Sea 90 km

- Population of Lithuania: 3,361,100 (1 April 2008) – 130th most populous country
- Area of Lithuania: 65,200 km^{2}
- Atlas of Lithuania

=== Environment of Lithuania ===
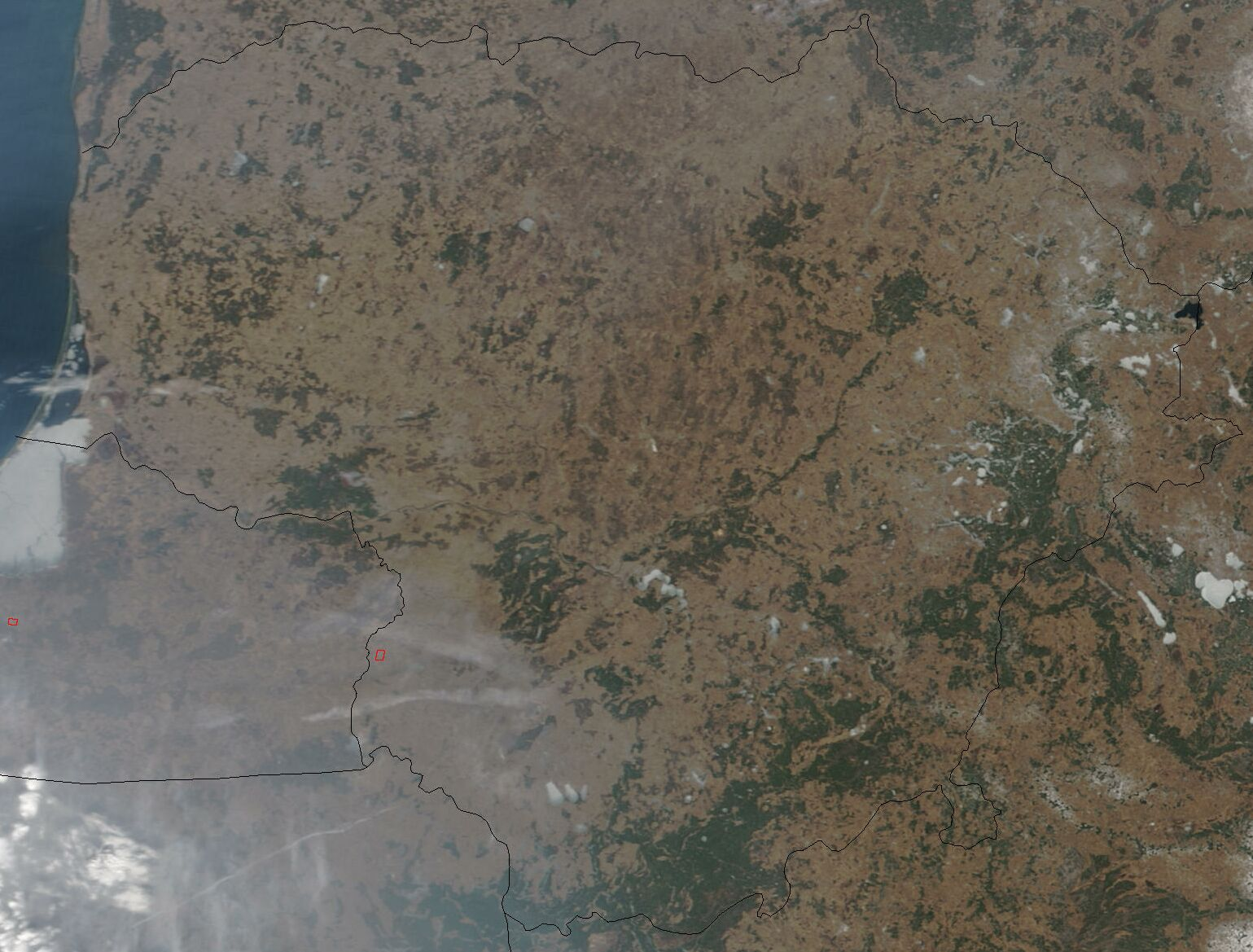
An enlargeable satellite image of Lithuania

Environment of Lithuania

- Climate of Lithuania
- Environmental issues in Lithuania
- Renewable energy in Lithuania
- Geology of Lithuania
- Protected areas of Lithuania
  - Biosphere reserves in Lithuania
  - National parks of Lithuania
  - Regional parks in Lithuania
- Wildlife of Lithuania
  - Flora of Lithuania
  - Fauna of Lithuania
    - Birds of Lithuania
    - Mammals of Lithuania

==== Natural geographic features of Lithuania ====
- Lakes of Lithuania
- Rivers of Lithuania
- World Heritage Sites in Lithuania

=== Regions of Lithuania ===
Cultural regions of Lithuania

==== Ecoregions of Lithuania ====
List of ecoregions in Lithuania

- Ecoregions in Lithuania

==== Administrative divisions of Lithuania ====
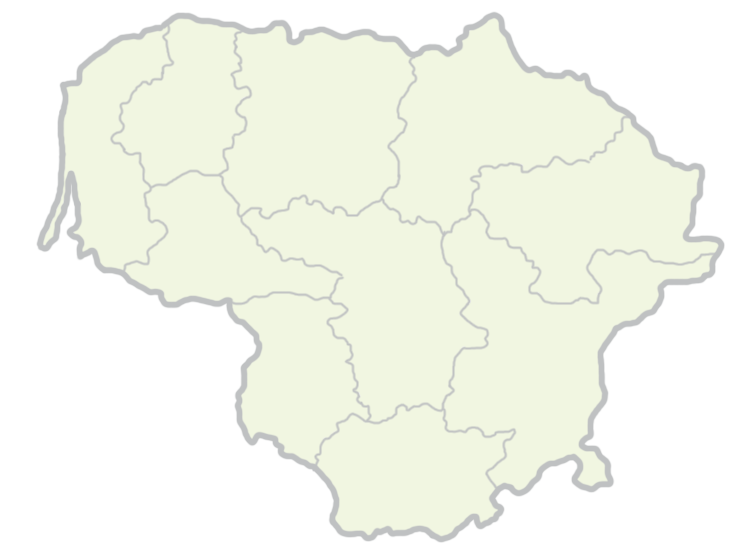

Administrative divisions of Lithuania

- Counties of Lithuania
  - Municipalities of Lithuania
    - Elderships of Lithuania
- Capital of Lithuania: Vilnius
- Cities of Lithuania
- Towns in Lithuania

=== Demography of Lithuania ===
Demographics of Lithuania

== Government and politics of Lithuania ==
Politics of Lithuania

- Form of government: unitary semi-presidential representative democratic republic
- Elections in Lithuania
- Political parties in Lithuania
- Taxation in Lithuania

=== Branches of the government of Lithuania ===
Government of the Republic of Lithuania

==== Executive branch of the government of Lithuania ====
- Head of state: President of Lithuania, Gitanas Nausėda
- Head of government: Prime Minister of Lithuania, Inga Ruginienė
- Cabinet of Lithuania

==== Legislative branch of the government of Lithuania ====
- Seimas: Speaker, Juozas Olekas

==== Judicial branch of the government of Lithuania ====
The court system of Lithuania

- Supreme Court of Lithuania
- Constitutional Court of Lithuania

=== Foreign relations of Lithuania ===
Foreign relations of Lithuania

- Diplomatic missions in Lithuania
- Diplomatic missions of Lithuania

==== International organization membership ====
The Republic of Lithuania is a member of:

- Australia Group
- Baltic Assembly (BA)
- Bank for International Settlements (BIS)
- Council of Europe (CE)
- Council of the Baltic Sea States (CBSS)
- Euro-Atlantic Partnership Council (EAPC)
- European Bank for Reconstruction and Development (EBRD)
- European Investment Bank (EIB)
- European Space Agency (ESA) (associate state)
- European Union (EU)
- Food and Agriculture Organization (FAO)
- International Atomic Energy Agency (IAEA)
- International Bank for Reconstruction and Development (IBRD)
- International Chamber of Commerce (ICC)
- International Civil Aviation Organization (ICAO)
- International Criminal Court (ICCt)
- International Criminal Police Organization (Interpol)
- International Development Association (IDA)
- International Federation of Red Cross and Red Crescent Societies (IFRCS)
- International Finance Corporation (IFC)
- International Labour Organization (ILO)
- International Maritime Organization (IMO)
- International Monetary Fund (IMF)
- International Olympic Committee (IOC)
- International Organization for Migration (IOM)
- International Organization for Standardization (ISO)
- International Red Cross and Red Crescent Movement (ICRM)
- International Telecommunication Union (ITU)
- International Trade Union Confederation (ITUC)
- Inter-Parliamentary Union (IPU)
- Multilateral Investment Guarantee Agency (MIGA)
- Nordic Investment Bank (NIB)
- North Atlantic Treaty Organization (NATO)
- Nuclear Suppliers Group (NSG)
- Organisation internationale de la Francophonie (OIF) (observer)
- Organisation for Economic Co-operation and Development (OECD)
- Organization for Security and Co-operation in Europe (OSCE)
- Organisation for the Prohibition of Chemical Weapons (OPCW)
- Permanent Court of Arbitration (PCA)
- Schengen Agreement
- United Nations (UN)
- United Nations Conference on Trade and Development (UNCTAD)
- UNESCO
- United Nations Industrial Development Organization (UNIDO)
- United Nations Observer Mission in Georgia (UNOMIG)
- Universal Postal Union (UPU)
- Western European Union (WEU) (associate partner)
- World Confederation of Labour (WCL)
- World Customs Organization (WCO)
- World Federation of Trade Unions (WFTU)
- World Health Organization (WHO)
- World Intellectual Property Organization (WIPO)
- World Meteorological Organization (WMO)
- World Tourism Organization (UNWTO)
- World Trade Organization (WTO)
- Zangger Committee (ZC) (permanent observer)

=== Law and order in Lithuania ===
Law of Lithuania

- Constitution of Lithuania
- Crime in Lithuania
- Human rights in Lithuania
  - LGBT rights in Lithuania
  - Freedom of religion in Lithuania
- Law enforcement in Lithuania
  - Financial Crime Investigation Service
  - Special Investigation Service
  - Lithuanian State Border Guard Service

=== Military of Lithuania ===
Lithuanian Armed Forces

- Command
  - President of Lithuania, the commander-in-chief
    - Ministry of Defense
    - Chief of Defence
    - Defence Staff
- Forces
  - Lithuanian Land Forces
  - Lithuanian Naval Force
  - Lithuanian Air Force
  - Lithuanian Special Operations Force
  - Lithuanian National Defence Volunteer Forces
- Military history of Lithuania
- Military ranks of Lithuania

=== Local government in Lithuania ===
Local government in Lithuania

== History of Lithuania ==
History of Lithuania

- Timeline of the history of Lithuania
- Current events in Lithuania
- Economic history of Lithuania
- Military history of Lithuania

== Culture of Lithuania ==
Culture of Lithuania

- Architecture of Lithuania
  - Gothic architecture in Lithuania
- Cuisine of Lithuania
- Ethnic minorities in Lithuania
- Festivals in Lithuania
- Languages of Lithuania
- Media in Lithuania
- Museums in Lithuania
- National symbols of Lithuania
  - Coat of arms of Lithuania
  - Flag of Lithuania
  - National anthem of Lithuania
- People of Lithuania
- Public holidays in Lithuania
- Records of Lithuania
- Religion in Lithuania
  - Buddhism in Lithuania
  - Christianity in Lithuania
  - Hinduism in Lithuania
  - Islam in Lithuania
  - Judaism in Lithuania
  - Sikhism in Lithuania
- World Heritage Sites in Lithuania

=== Art in Lithuania ===
- Art in Lithuania
- Cinema of Lithuania
- Literature of Lithuania
- Music of Lithuania
- Television in Lithuania
- Theatre in Lithuania

=== Sports in Lithuania ===
Sports in Lithuania

- Basketball in Lithuania
- Football in Lithuania
- Lithuania at the Olympics

== Economy and infrastructure of Lithuania ==
Economy of Lithuania

- Economic rank, by nominal GDP (2007): 74th (seventy-fourth)
- Agriculture in Lithuania
- Banking in Lithuania
  - National Bank of Lithuania
- Communications in Lithuania
  - Internet in Lithuania
  - Radio stations in Lithuania
- Companies of Lithuania
- Currency of Lithuania: Euro
  - ISO 4217: EUR
- Economic history of Lithuania
- Energy in Lithuania
  - Renewable energy in Lithuania
  - Petroleum industry in Lithuania
- Health in Lithuania
- Lithuania Stock Exchange
- Tourism in Lithuania
- Transport in Lithuania
  - Airports in Lithuania
  - Rail transport in Lithuania
  - Roads in Lithuania

== Education in Lithuania ==
Education in Lithuania

== See also ==
Lithuania

- List of international rankings
- List of Lithuania-related topics
- Member state of the European Union
- Member state of the North Atlantic Treaty Organization
- Member state of the United Nations
- Outline of Europe
- Outline of geography
