= Human rights in Lithuania =

Human rights in Lithuania are largely protected in the Constitution of Lithuania and ratified international law.

Lithuania scored 91 out of 100 in 2019 report by Freedom House, which classifies the country as "free", with high rankings in civil liberties and political rights. The country has the highest score in freedom of assembly and nongovernmental organisations. According to 2025 World Press Freedom Index by Reporters Without Borders, Lithuania ranks 14th among 180 countries, indicating a very high level of press freedom.

However, there are concerns regarding children's welfare, domestic violence and discrimination against minorities, particularly Roma and LGBTQ+ people. The Human Rights Monitoring Institute recommended that Lithuania "refer to their northern neighbors and invest more in protecting citizens, especially women's and children's human rights", which are poorly fared and need to be improved. In the 2023 report, the US State Department concluded that there were "no credible reports of significant human rights abuses", but noted poor prison and detention center conditions and domestic abuse as pervasive problems.

== Legal framework ==
Lithuania has a Roman-inspired legal system. Lithuania restored its democratic and independent statehood in 1990, after the decades of Soviet occupation. The Constitution of Lithuania, adopted by referendum in 1992, established the foundation of the social system and defined the rights, freedoms and duties of citizens. The Constitution has been amended several times, with the latest amendment made in 2016.

Chapter II of the Constitution, containing Articles 18 to 37, is titled "The Human Being And The State". This chapter is the most relevant to the protection of human rights.

== Civil Liberties ==
=== Freedom of expression ===
In Article 25 of the Constitution of Lithuania, people's rights of free conviction and expression are stated as "No one should be hindered from seeking, acquiring or disseminating information and ideas." Freedom of speech and the press are generally respected by the Lithuanian government.

In December 2016, Seimas initially voted for the Civil Code amendments, limiting the right to criticize public figures. This was severely criticized by the media, human rights organizations and the legal scholars. Subsequently, President Dalia Grybauskaitė vetoed the amendment and the parliament did not pursue the changes.

==== Freedom of the press ====
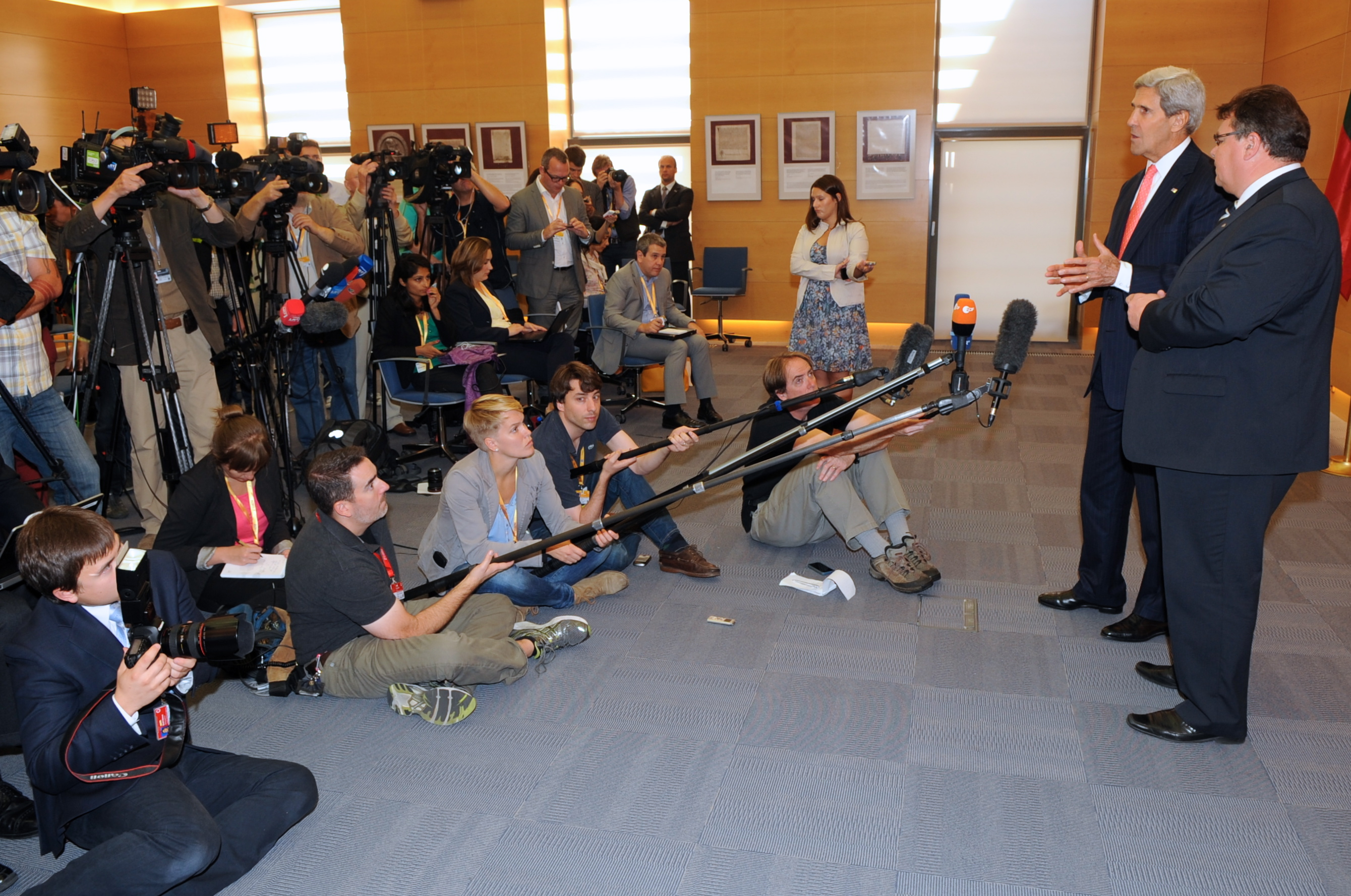
Speaking to the Press

According to 2025 World Press Freedom Index by Reporters Without Borders, Lithuania ranks 14th among 180 countries in the world. On 11 January 2018, the day before the anniversary of the violent 1991 January Events, the ruling Lithuanian Farmers and Greens Union advocated outlawing Russian media due to disinformation. There were several suspensions of the Russian state TV broadcasting citing incitement of hatred. In 2018, European Commission concluded that the suspensions were compliant with the EU rules, while Reports Without Borders criticized the bans.

Following the Russian invasion of Ukraine in 2022, Lithuania banned the Russian and Belarusian TV channels due to incitement of war, hatred and dissemination of war propaganda.

==== Freedom of information ====
According to the Human Rights Monitoring Institute, in September 2018, the government agency Centre of Registers (Lithuanian: Registrų centras) considered to cease providing information to journalists free of charge, as such practice was not included in the law and therefore it argued that the journalists should pay the standard commercial rates for the requests of information. Following the criticism in the media, in October, the Government of Lithuania decided that the service costs will be compensated from the budget and instructed the agency to provide information to journalists free of charge.

In April 2021, Seimas passed the amendments to the law, enshrining the right of journalists to request information from several state registers free of charge.

==== Freedom of the Internet ====
In Lithuania, access to Internet for citizens is not restricted by the government. According to the European Court of Human Rights, prisoners in Lithuania should not be restricted access to internet featuring study and learning programs, as they found that Lithuania barred a prisoner from applying to an online law course, which violated Article 10 of the convention.

=== Freedom of assembly ===
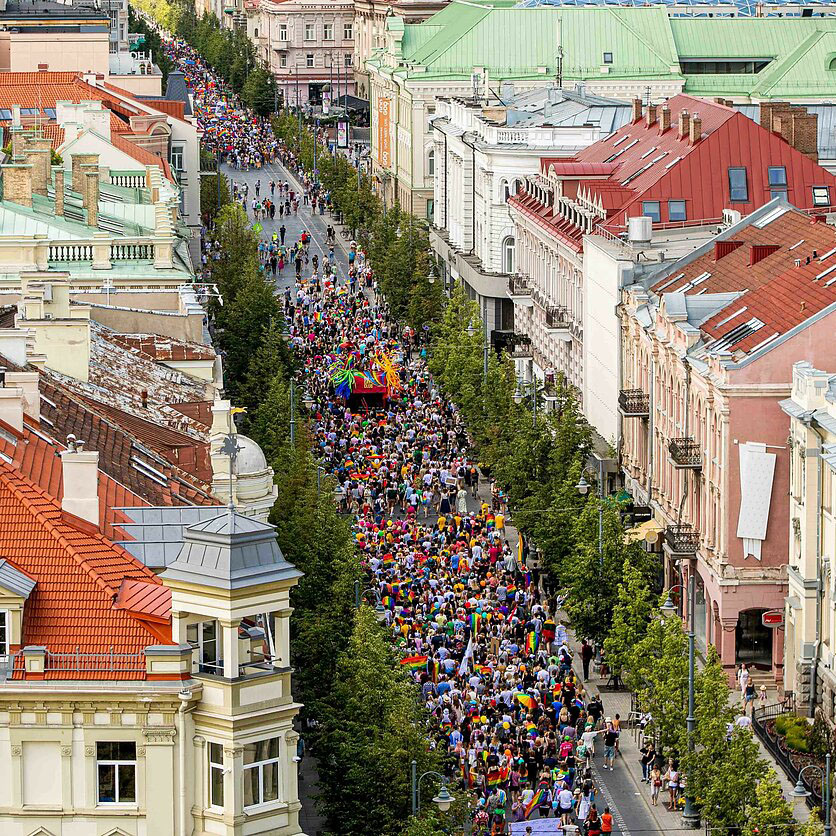
Baltic Pride 2019 in Vilnius

Article 36 of the Constitution of the Republic of Lithuania states the rights for citizens to assemble unarmed in peaceful meetings. The law on meetings of the Republic of Lithuania is set to guarantee the constitutional rights of the citizens about assemble and the procedure for protecting national security and public safety. Based on the statistic of Freedom House, before 2018 freedom of assembly in Lithuania was stated as generally observed, while in 2018 and 2019 it improved to be as generally respected.

Regarding Lithuanian lesbian, gay, bisexual and transgender (LGBT) people, Amnesty International urges Lithuanian authorities to provide them opportunities to hold tolerance events and give enough police protection during the events. In 2010, the first Pride march for LGBT persons was allowed by Lithuania's supreme administrative court to be held in Vilnius. In 2013, the mayor of Vilnius attempted to forcefully relocate the Pride march from the central avenue to a remote street outside the city center, but was unsuccessful due to the protection from two courts. The Baltic Pride took place in Vilnius and marched on the main avenue without any major incidents. The Baltic Pride held on June 18, 2016 in Vilnius was a success, with no institutional obstacles or tedious legal battles compared to the last two. A crowd of 3,000 LGBT community members and their allies joined the March for Equality in memory of the victims of the Orlando attack. The mayor of Vilnius did not attend, but did send compliments to the event. There were no serious incidents other than a member of Parliament, Petras Gražulis, attacking the procession and having to be dragged by the police.

=== Freedom of religion ===
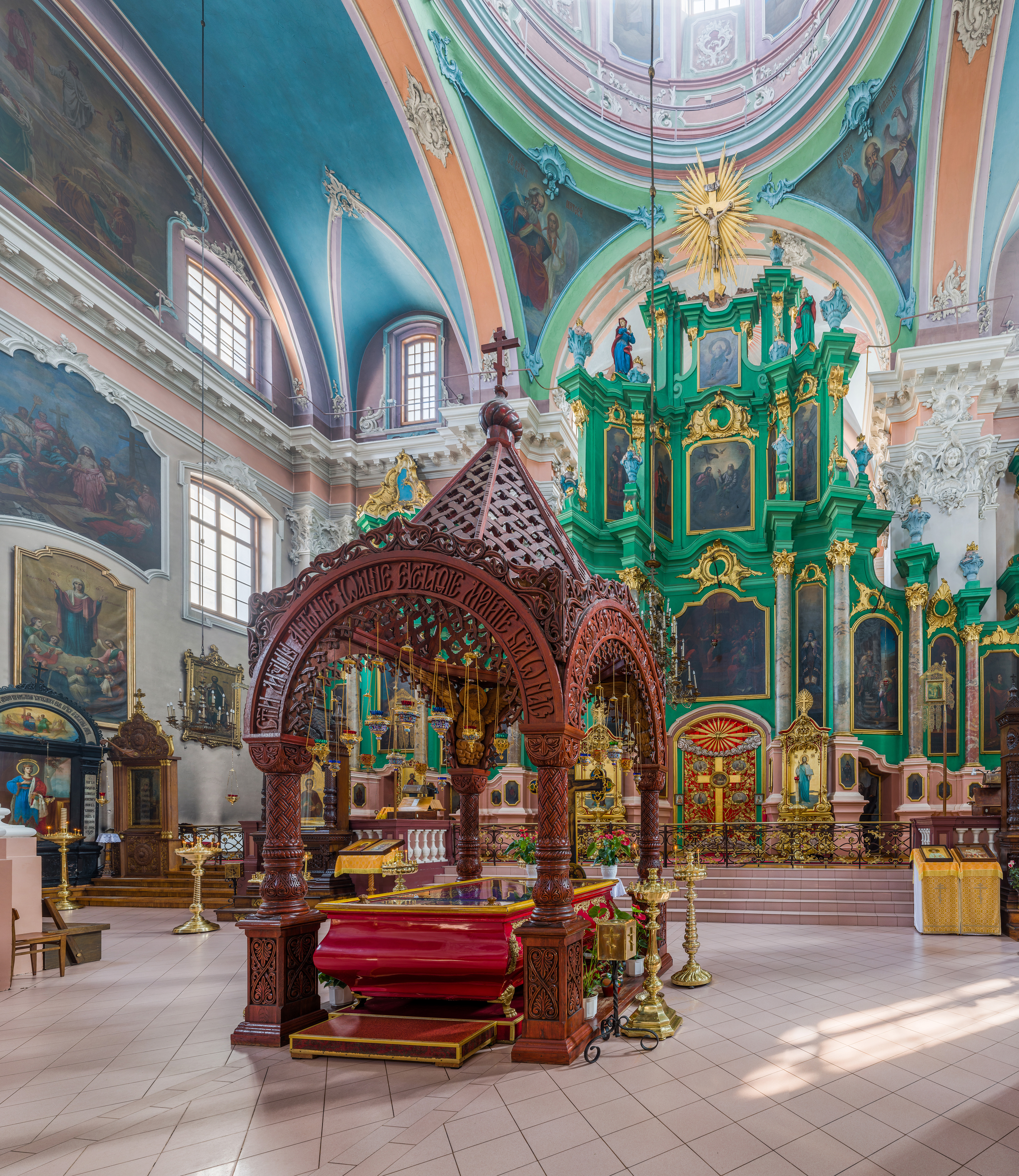
Orthodox Church of the Holy Spirit in Vilnius

Religious freedom is guaranteed by Lithuanian Constitution in Article 26 and other laws. The criminal code includes three provisions to protect freedom of religion. It prohibits religious discrimination and provides for up to 2 years in prison for violations. Article 43 of the Constitution defines the relationship between religion and the State. The law divides registered religious groups into state-recognized traditional religious groups, other state-recognized religious groups, and all other registered communities and associations. The religious communities are divided into "traditional" and "other".

In 2009 Report on International Religious Freedom, it is stated that there are nine "traditional" religious groups listed by law that can trace their presence in the country back at least 300 years: Latin Church Catholics (Roman Catholics), Evangelical Lutherans, Evangelical Reformed Churchgoers, Eastern Catholics, Eastern Orthodox Christians, Old Believers, Jews, Sunni Muslims and Karaites. These traditional religious groups can enjoy many government benefits, including receive annual government subsidies that other groups are not granted to. Other state-recognized religious groups involve those who officially registered in the country for at least 25 years, have societal support from at least 15 adult citizens and have instructions that are in accord with laws and morality. Nontraditional groups can have the support from public funds for cultural and social projects.

In 2017, a TV show in Lithuania was closed because one of the judges, actress and former lawmaker gave a Nazi salute while contestants sang a song that was made popular by a Jewish singer. Anti-Semitic and anti-Muslim comments were common on the Internet.

== Personal data protection ==
The Lithuanian parliament passed the new law on personal data protection on 30 June 2018 and the law came into effect on 16 July 2018. The General Data Protection Regulation is about the protection of personal data both for consumers and companies/institutions and provides more options for consumers to control their data.

== Rights to private and family life ==
According to Equality and Human Rights Commission in the United Kingdom, in 2002 the European Court of Human Rights (ECHR) ruled the rights of marriage between men and women contained in Article 12 were to be extended to transgender people. In Article 8, titled "Respect for your private and family life", it is stated that private life is a very broad concept; it calls for citizens to be free to understand and determine one's sexual orientation and personal identity, (and identify as one chooses appropriate), while family life calls for the rights to a family living in peace, without interference by the public or government, and can include the relationship between an unmarried couple.

As stated in Article 38 of the Constitution, "Marriage shall be concluded upon the free mutual consent of man and woman." Lithuania fails to comply with human rights standards, due to there being no legal acknowledgment of non-married families. In 2017, the Lithuanian parliament (Seimas) completely rejected proposed legislation of same-sex partnerships. Lithuanians are one of only a few remaining EU countries with no form of legal recognition for same-sex couples; this includes Bulgaria, Latvia, Poland, Romania and Slovakia. Civil partnerships between people of both same and different genders are still unlikely to be established in Lithuania.

Human reproductive rights in Lithuania have not received much in the way of acknowledgment from public and governmental authorities, while faith-based organisations hamper the progress of the implementation of reproductive rights. In 2013, a drafted law, aimed at limiting access to safe and legal abortions, was presented to the national Parliament for assessment. Although this law would pose a real threat to women's health and lives (plus its violation of human rights), its authors and supporters continued to push to have it passed; this became a general concern and was protested by the Human Rights Monitoring Institute.

In the case of L. v. Lithuania (in 2007), L. is a transgender Lithuanian citizen who faces challenges in their daily life, due to the country failing to adopt a legal act outlining the conditions and procedures of gender reassignment. The European Court of Human Rights (ECHR) found that Lithuania had violated rights to private and family life, and ordered Lithuania to adopt the necessary legislation on gender reassignment within three months of the ruling. Lithuania paid the damages to the applicant, but did not adopt the required legislation in time. HRMI and the Lithuanian Gay League continued to advocate for full implementation of the Court's ruling. In 2011, the Court ordered the civil registry office to change L.'s birth certificate records, and the Residents’ Register Service to change their ID number.

In 2018, Lithuanian Prime Minister Saulius Skvernelis employed an LGBT rights rally in Vilnius to solicit the Lithuanian parliament to pass legislation for registered same-sex couples.

In June 2025, the Constitutional Court of Lithuania made a landmark decision by ruling that the absence of same-sex partnership institution in legislation is unconstitutional. The ruling noted that the parliament must amend the law to provide such institution. Since then, Lithuanian courts began instructing the civil registrars to register the same-sex partnerships.

== Concerns ==
=== Children's welfare ===
In the law on Protection against Domestic Violence, children's protection against violence is regulated. However, in the 2016 Country Reports on Human Rights Practices, it is stated that one of the most serious human rights issues in Lithuania is children's welfare. According to Lithuanian Children's Rights Ombudsman Institution report from 2007, violence against children comes from both families and public institutions. Also, bullying among children themselves is a big problem. In 2003, parental overuse of alcohol was the main reason of child abuse.

=== Domestic violence against women ===
In 2011, Lithuania passed the Law on Protection against Domestic Violence. According to the survey results of 2014 European Union Agency for Fundamental Rights, in Lithuania 1 in 3 (31%) women aged above 15 have experienced physical and/or sexual violence, which is quite close to the EU's overall level (33%). Domestic violence victims (women) are usually the ones who get blamed, which prevents women from asking or receiving real help. In 2017 4 out of 5 victims in the domestic violence cases (48000 registered) are women.

=== Abuses against refugees and migrants ===
Amnesty International reported that Lithuanian authorities have arbitrarily detained thousands of refugees and migrants in prison-like centers, alleging that they have been subjected to inhumane conditions, torture and other ill-treatment. Many people reported being beaten, insulted and subjected to racially motivated intimidation and harassment by guards. Immigrants, coming from the Belarusian border, from countries including Cameroon, the Democratic Republic of Congo, Iraq, Nigeria, Syria and Sri Lanka were detained and placed into centers.
