= Lithuanian military ranks and insignia =

The military ranks of Lithuania are the military insignia used by the Lithuanian Armed Forces.

== Current ==
=== Commissioned officer ranks ===
The rank insignia of commissioned officers.

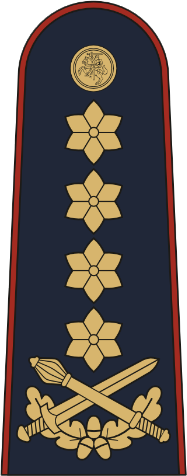
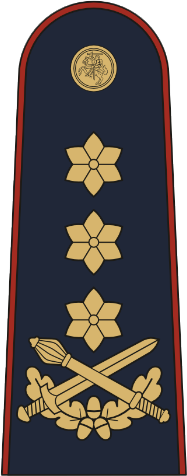
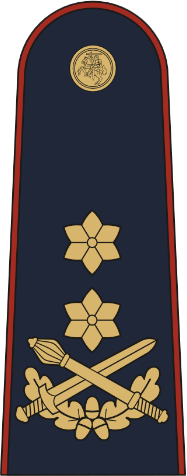
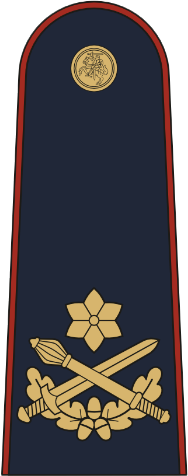
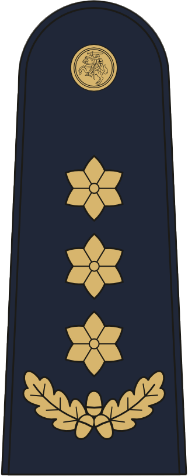
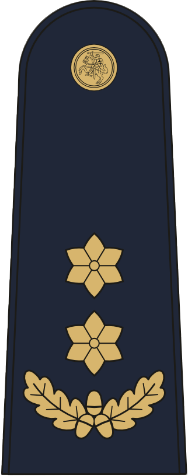
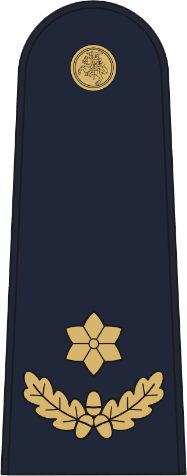
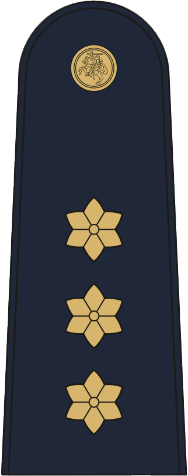
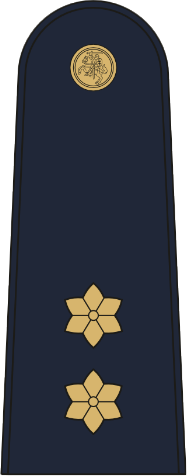
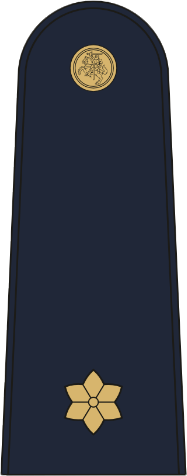
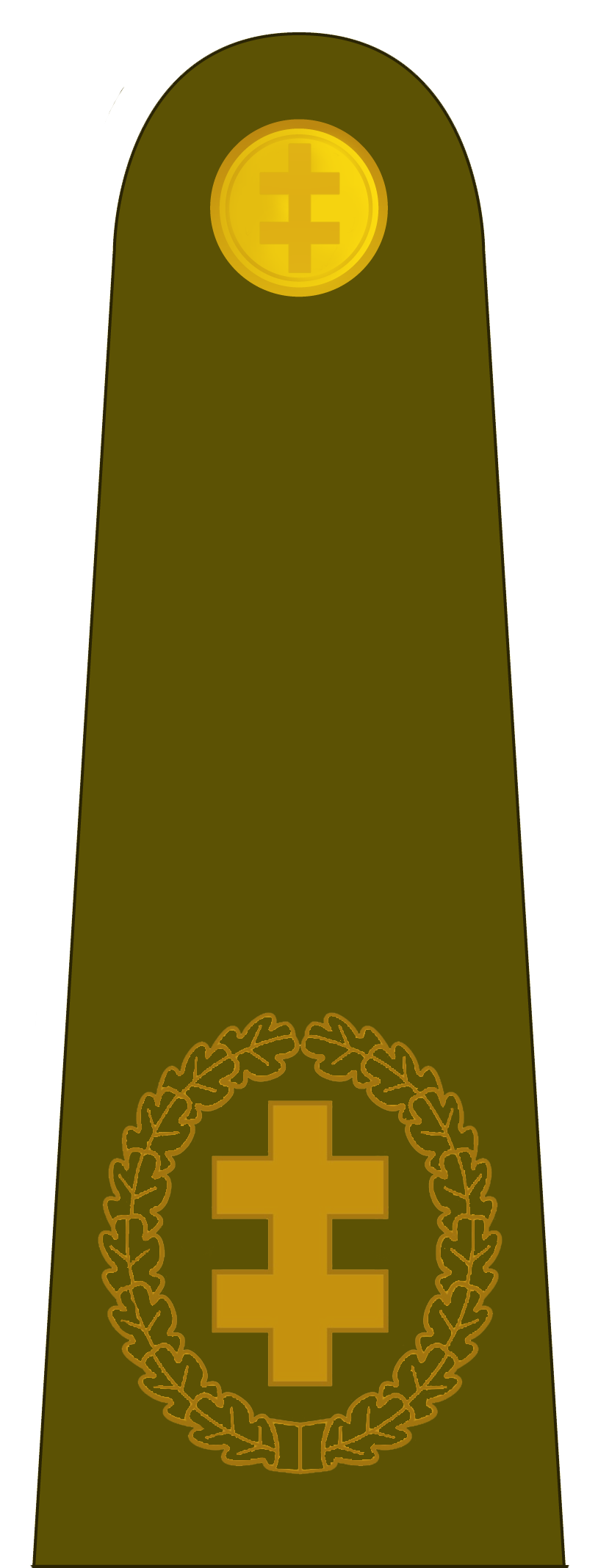
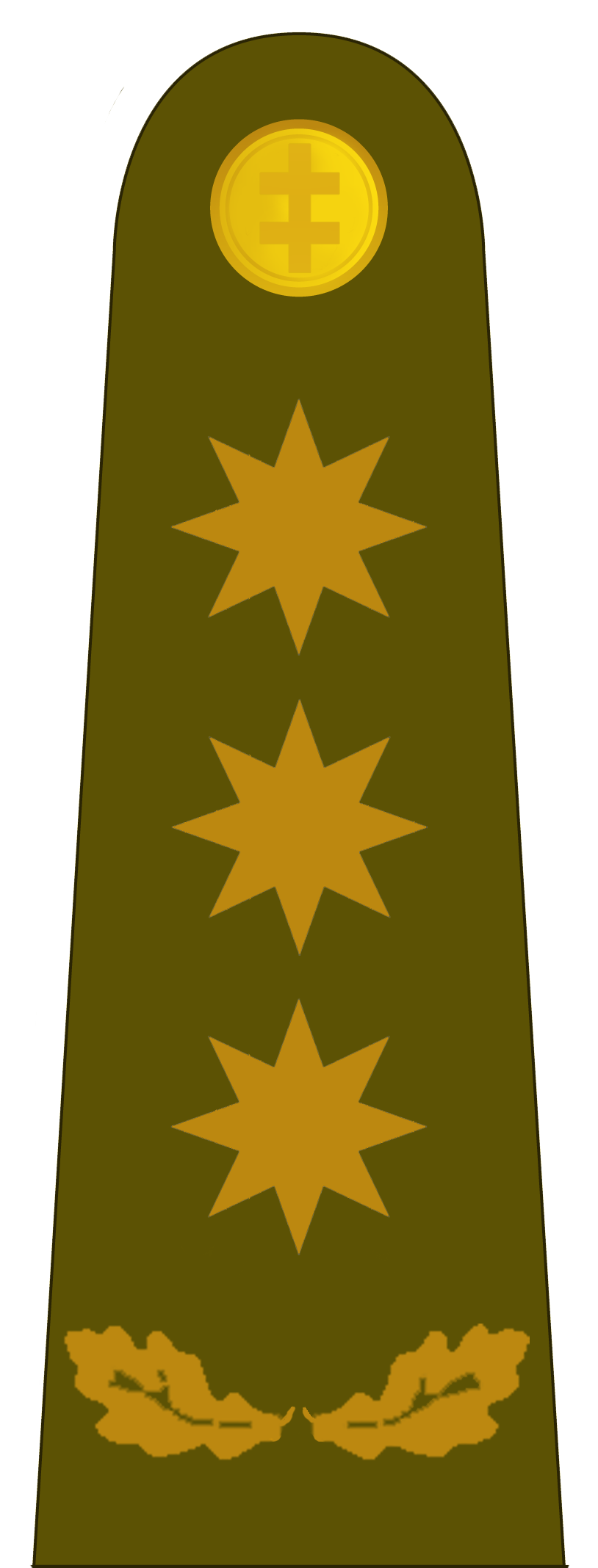
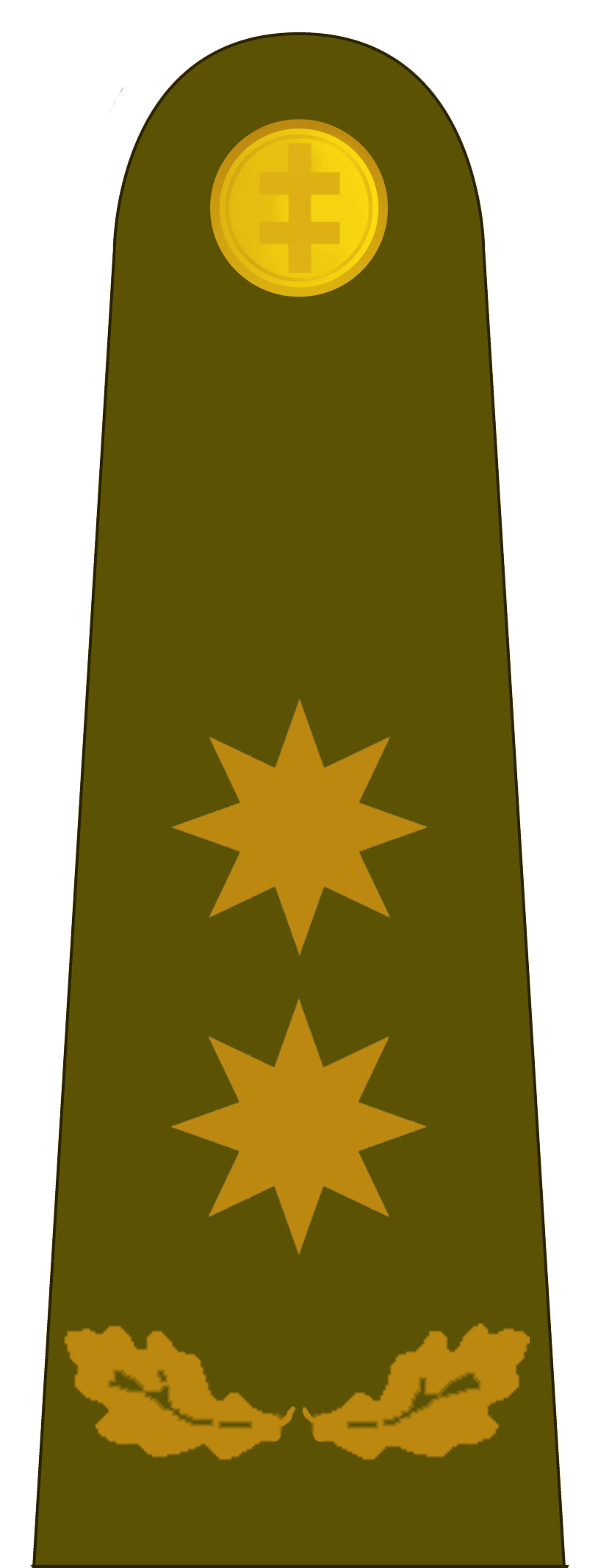
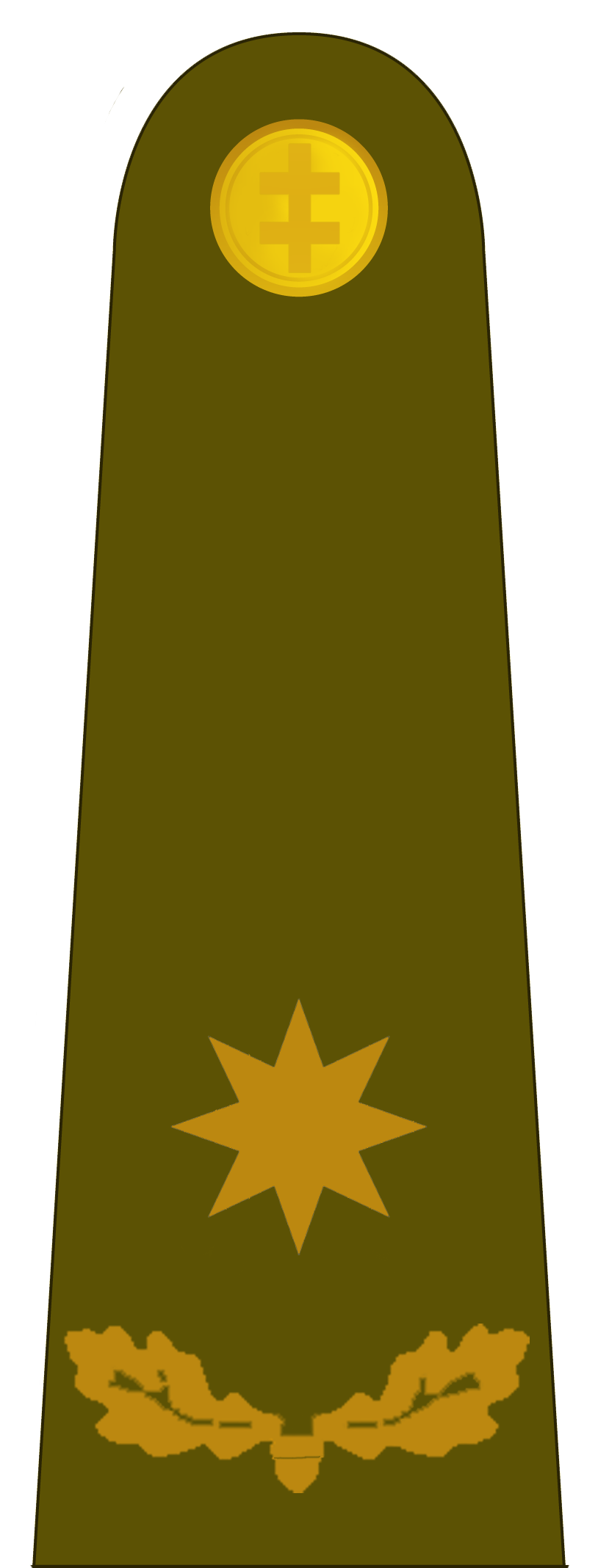
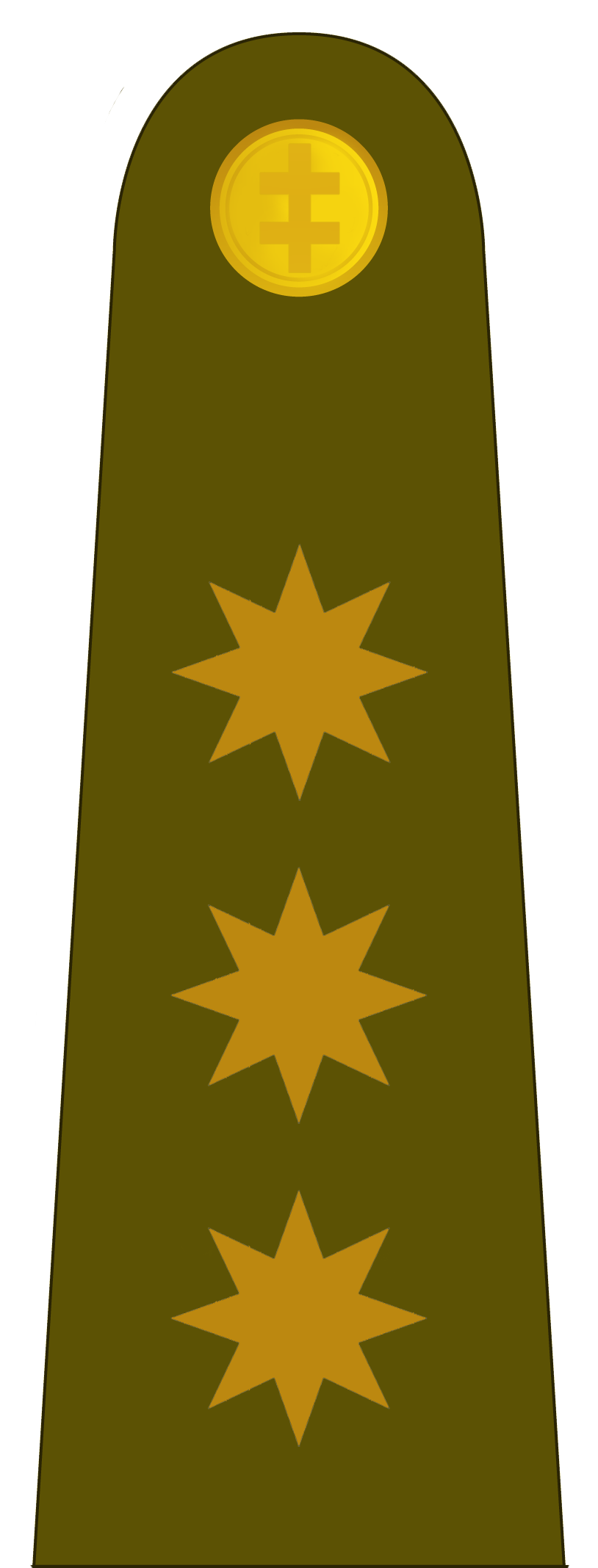
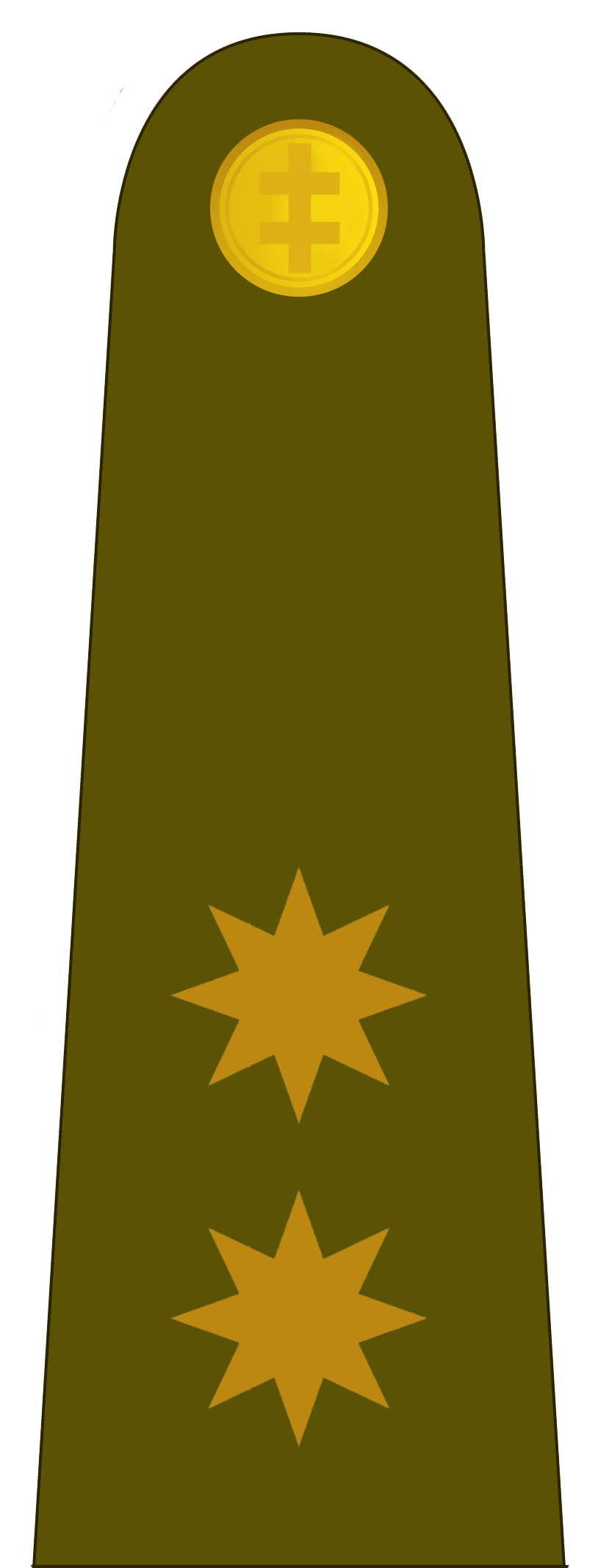
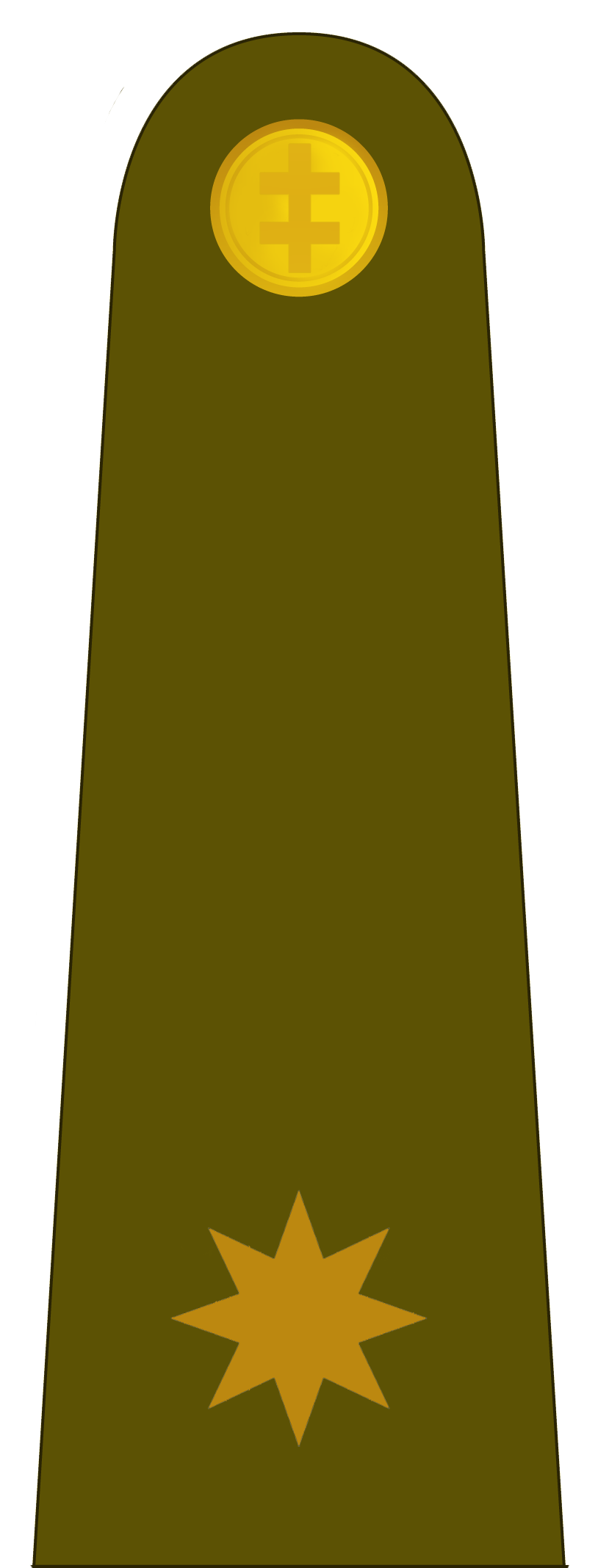
NATO code	OF-10	OF-9	OF-8	OF-7	OF-6	OF-5	OF-4	OF-3	OF-2	OF-1
Lithuanian Land Forces
Lithuanian Land Forces		Generolas	Generolas leitenantas	Generolas majoras	Brigados generolas	Pulkininkas	Pulkininkas leitenantas	Majoras	Kapitonas	Vyresnysis leitenantas	Leitenantas
Lithuanian Naval Force
Lithuanian Naval Force		Admirolas	Viceadmirolas	Kontradmirolas	Flotilės admirolas	Jūrų kapitonas	Komandoras	Komandoras leitenantas	Kapitonas leitenantas	Vyresnysis leitenantas	Leitenantas
Lithuanian Air Force
Lithuanian Air Force		Generolas	Generolas leitenantas	Generolas majoras	Brigados generolas	Pulkininkas	Pulkininkas leitenantas	Majoras	Kapitonas	Vyresnysis leitenantas	Leitenantas
Limitation (as of 2020)		< 14				< 66	< 262	< 963	N/A
Lithuanian Public Security Service
Lithuanian Public Security Service					Generolas	Pulkininkas	Pulkininkas leitenantas	Majoras	Kapitonas	Vyresnysis leitenantas	Leitenantas
Lithuanian State Border Guard Service
Lithuanian State Border Guard Service					Generolas	Pulkininkas	Pulkininkas leitenantas	Majoras	Kapitonas	Vyresnysis leitenantas	Leitenantas
Lithuanian Riflemen's Union
Lithuanian Riflemen's Union					Lietuvos Šaulių Sąjungos vadas	Lietuvos Šaulių Sąjungos vado pavaduotojas	Rinktinės vadas	Rinktinės vado pavaduotojas	Kuopos vadas	Kuopos vado pavaduotojas	Būrio vadas
NATO code	OF-10	OF-9	OF-8	OF-7	OF-6	OF-5	OF-4	OF-3	OF-2	OF-1

=== Other ranks ===
The rank insignia of non-commissioned officers and enlisted personnel.

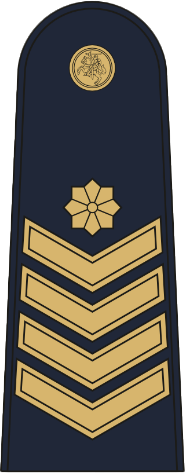
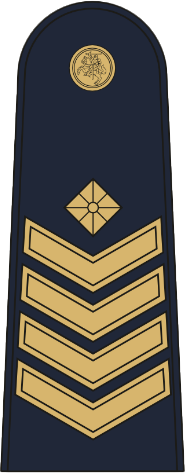
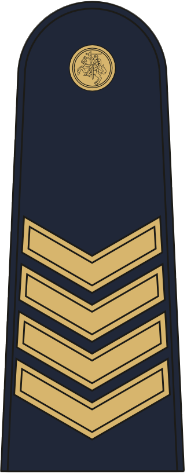
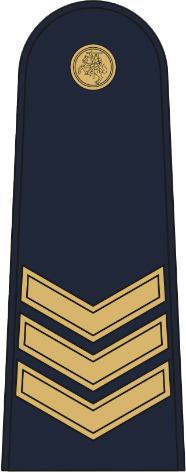
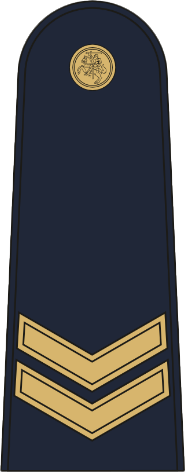
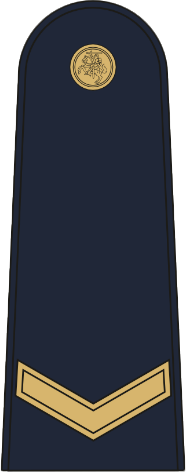
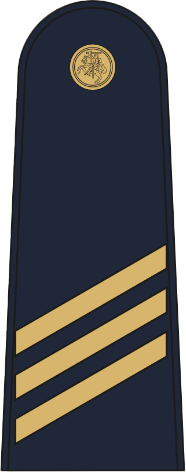
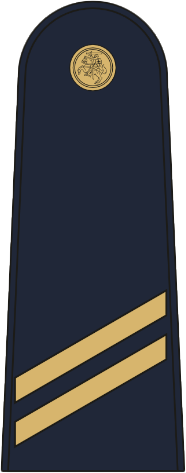
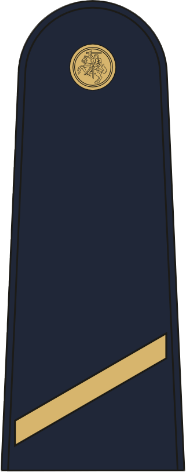
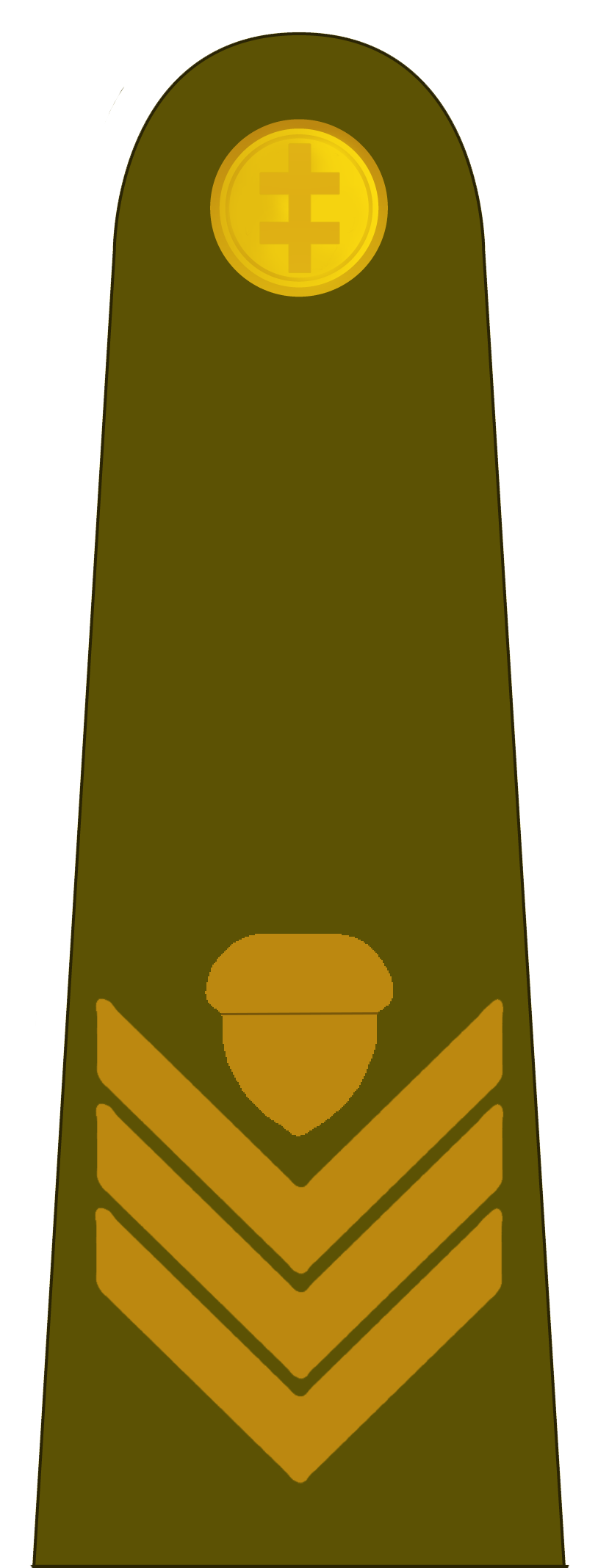
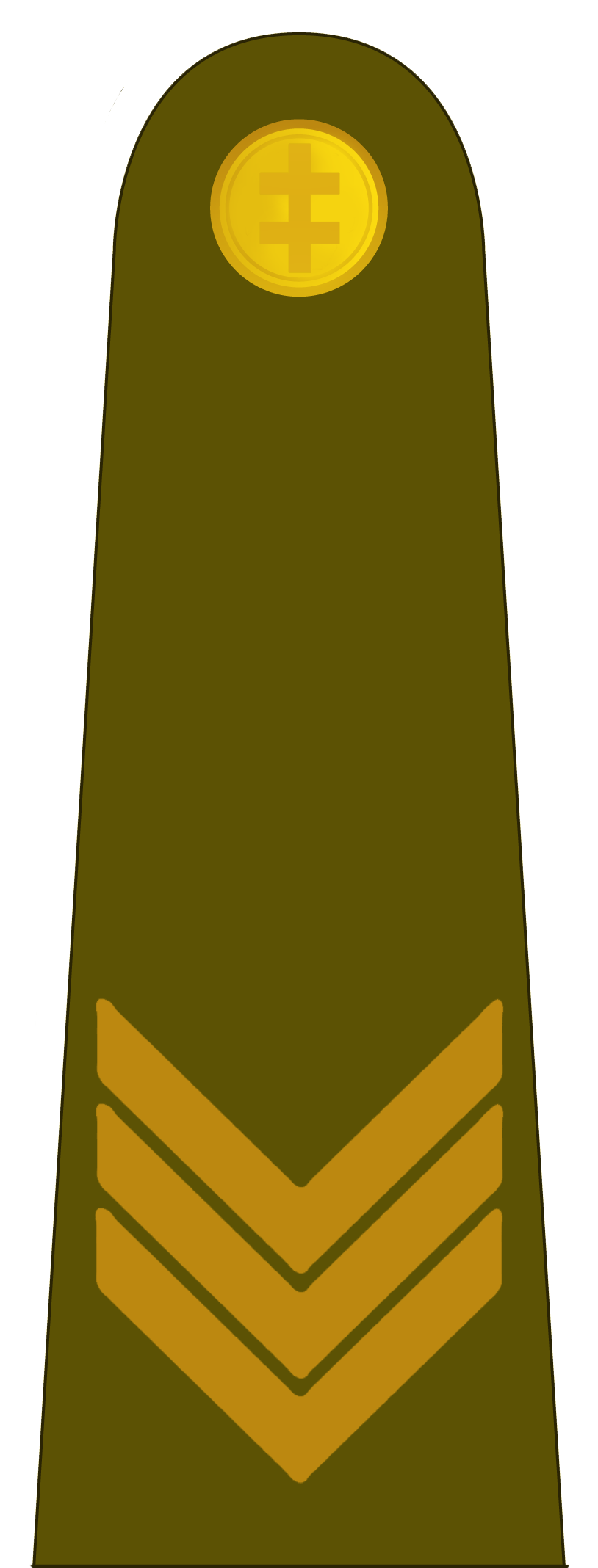
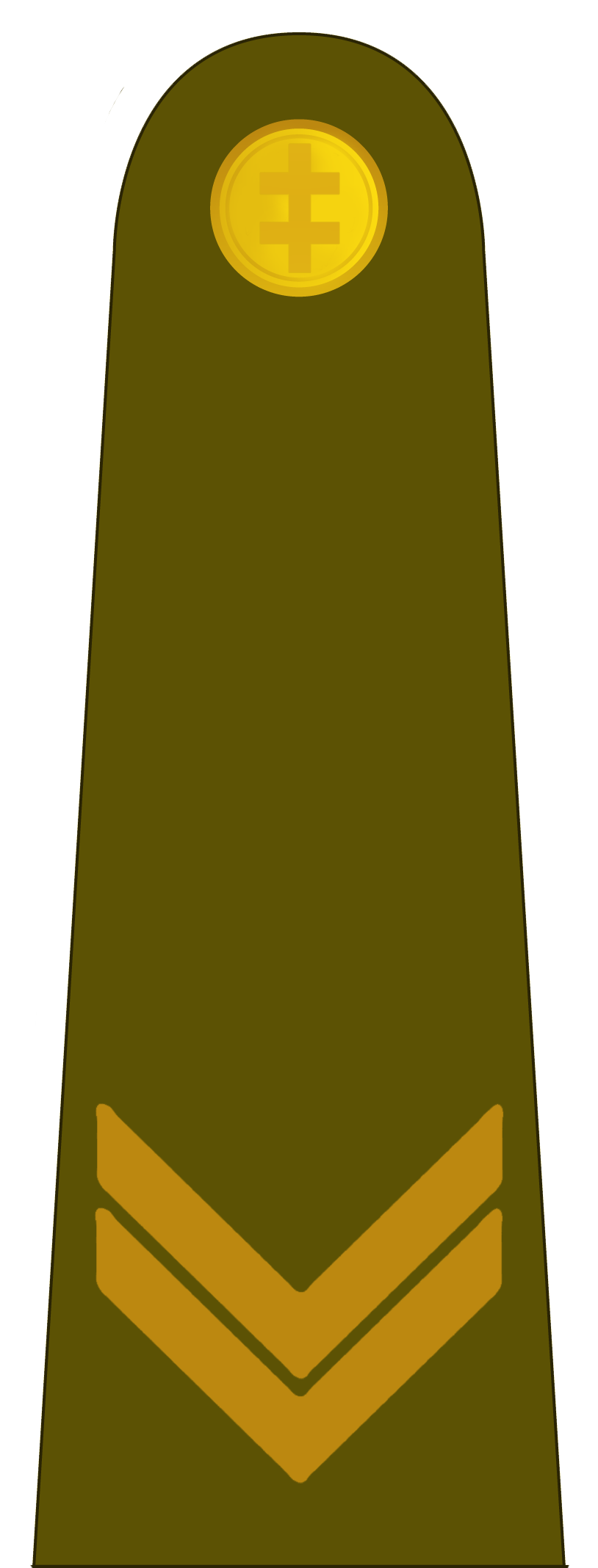
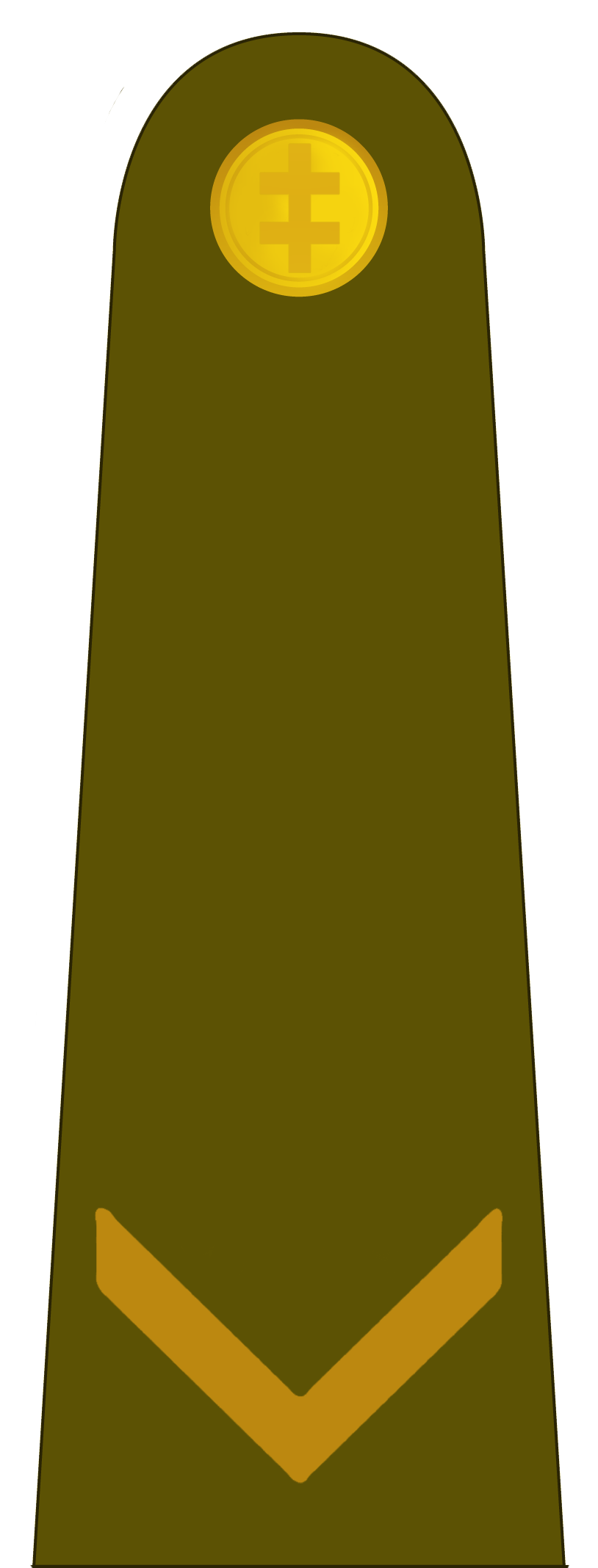
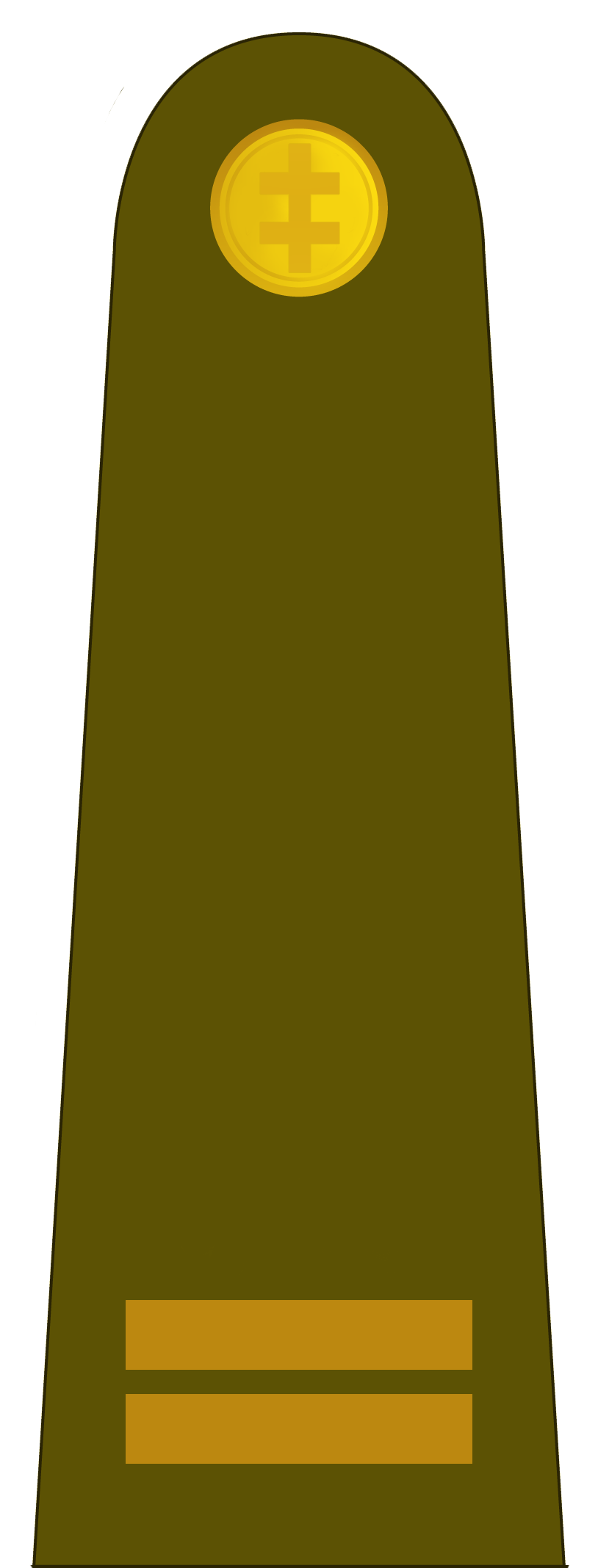
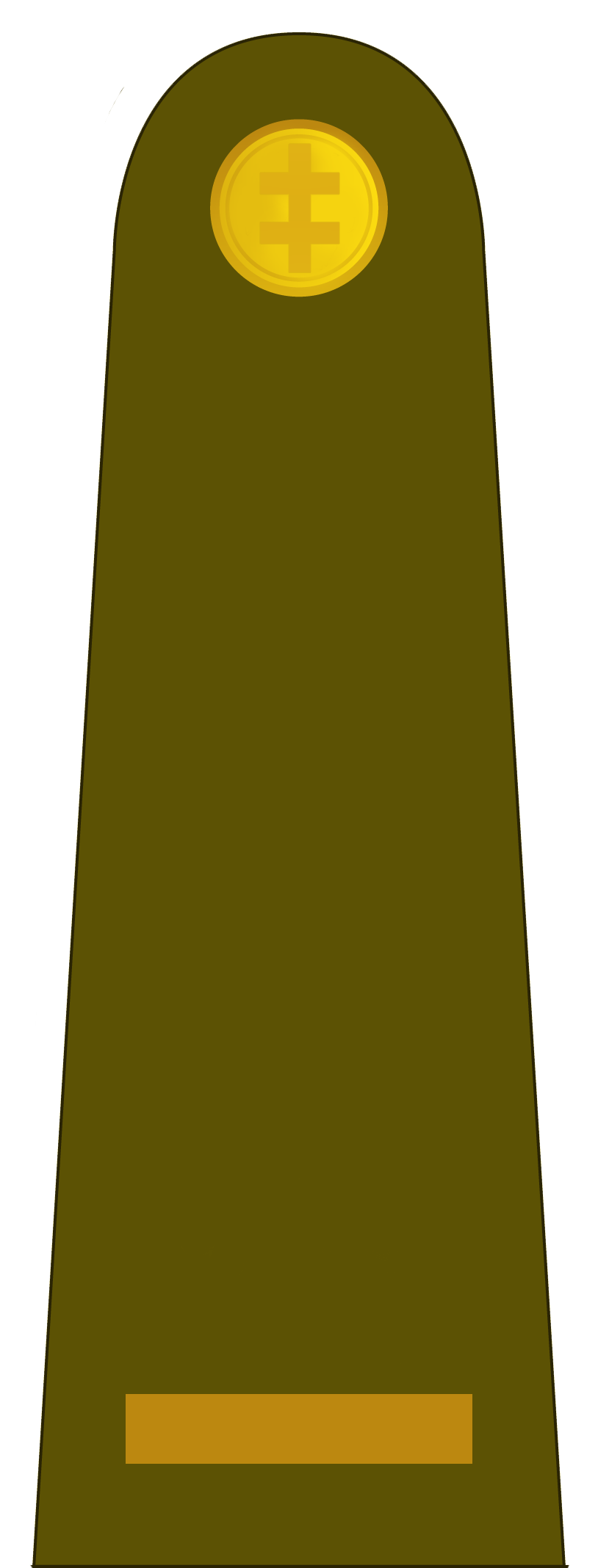
NATO code	OR-9	OR-8	OR-7	OR-6	OR-5	OR-4	OR-3	OR-2	OR-1
Lithuanian Land Forces
Lithuanian Land Forces	Seržantas majoras	Viršila	Štabo seržantas	Vyresnysis seržantas	Seržantas	Grandinis	Vyresnysis eilinis	Eilinis	Jaunesnysis eilinis
Lithuanian Naval Force
Lithuanian Naval Force	Vyresnysis laivūnas	Laivūnas	Štabo laivūnas	Vyresnysis seržantas	Seržantas	Grandinis	Vyresnysis jūreivis	Jūreivis	Jaunesnysis jūreivis
Lithuanian Air Force
Lithuanian Air Force	Seržantas majoras	Viršila	Štabo seržantas	Vyresnysis seržantas	Seržantas	Grandinis	Vyresnysis eilinis	Eilinis	Jaunesnysis eilinis
Lithuanian Public Security Service
Lithuanian Public Security Service			Vyresnysis puskarininkis	Puskarininkis	Jaunesnysis puskarininkis	Grandinis
Lithuanian State Border Guard Service
Lithuanian State Border Guard Service			Vyresnysis puskarininkis	Puskarininkis	Jaunesnysis puskarininkis	Grandinis
Lithuanian Riflemen's Union
Lithuanian Riflemen's Union			Jaunųjų šaulių vadas	Vyresnysis specialistas	Būrio vado pavaduotojas (Būrininkas)	Skyriaus vadas (Skyrininkas)		Vyriausias šaulys Skyriaus vado pavaduotojas	Eilinis Šaulys
NATO code	OR-9	OR-8	OR-7	OR-6	OR-5	OR-4	OR-3	OR-2	OR-1

==== Specialist ranks ====
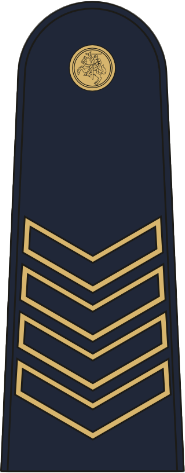
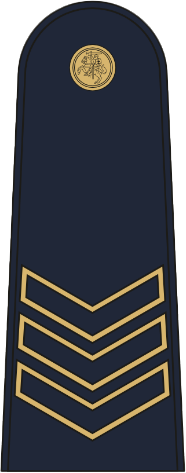
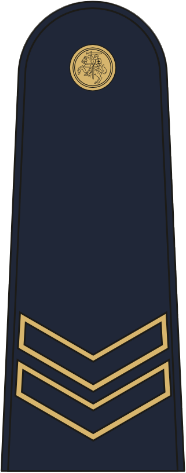
NATO Code	OR-7	OR-6	OR-5
Lithuanian Land Forces
Lithuanian Land Forces	Štabo seržantas specialistas	Vyresnysis seržantas specialistas	Seržantas specialistas
Lithuanian Naval Force
Lithuanian Naval Force	Štabo laivūnas specialistas	Vyresnysis seržantas specialistas	Seržantas specialistas
Lithuanian Air Force
Lithuanian Air Force	Štabo seržantas specialistas	Vyresnysis seržantas specialistas	Seržantas specialistas

== Historical ==
=== 2012−2024 ===
Officers

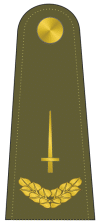
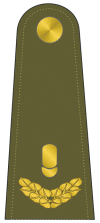
NATO code	OF-10	OF-9	OF-8	OF-7	OF-6	OF-5	OF-4	OF-3		OF-2	OF-1
Lithuanian Riflemen's Union
Lithuanian Riflemen's Union					Lietuvos Šaulių Sąjungos vadas	Lietuvos Šaulių Sąjungos vado pirmasis pavaduotojas	Lietuvos Šaulių Sąjungos vado pavaduotojas	Sąjungos štabo pareigūnas	Rinktinės vadas	Rinktinės vado pirmasis pavaduotojas	Rinktinės vado pavaduotojas	Rinktinės štabo pareigūnas	Kuopos vadas

Other ranks

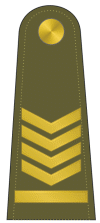
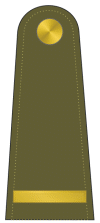
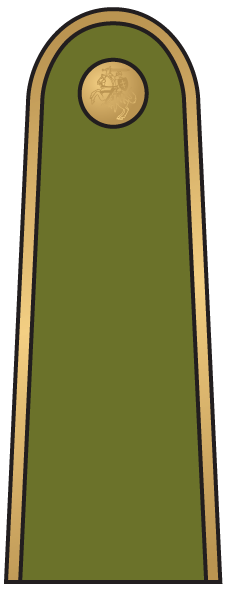
NATO code	OR-9	OR-8	OR-7	OR-6	OR-5	OR-4		OR-3	OR-2	OR-1
Lithuanian Riflemen's Union
Lithuanian Riflemen's Union			Kuopos vado pavaduotojas	Burio vadosa	Būrio vado pavaduotojas (Būrininkas)	Skyriaus vadas (Skyrininkas)	Vyriausias šaulys Skyriaus vado pavaduotojas			Eilinis Šaulys

== See also ==
- Ranks and insignia of NATO
- List of comparative military ranks
