= International rankings of Lithuania =

These are the international rankings of Lithuania

== International rankings ==
Rankings
Name	Year	Place	Out of #	Reference
CIA World Factbook – GDP per capita (PPP)	2009	74th	228	
CIA World Factbook – life expectancy	2009	87th	224	
International Living Magazine – Quality-of-life index	2010	22nd	194	Quality-of-life index
NationMaster – Index of Civil and Political Liberties	–	16th	132	
New Economics Foundation – Happy Planet Index	2009	86th	143	
Reporters Without Borders – Press Freedom Index	2009	10th	175	
Save the Children – Mother's Index Rank	2007	20th	141	
Save the Children – Women's Index Rank	2007	14th	141	
Save the Children – Children's Index Rank	2007	29th	141	
The Economist Intelligence Unit – E-readiness	2008	38th	70	
The Economist Intelligence Unit – Global Peace Index	2009	43rd	144	
The Economist Intelligence Unit – Index of Democracy	2008	42nd	167	
The Economist Intelligence Unit – Quality-of-life index	2005	63rd	111	
The Fund for Peace – Failed States Index	2009	145th	177	
Transparency International – Corruption Perceptions Index	2009	52nd	180	
United Nations – Human Development Index	2009	46th	192	
United States Patent and Trademark Office's list of patents by country	2008	70th	172	
Yale University / Columbia University – Environmental Performance Index	2010	37th	163	
Wall Street Journal / The Heritage Foundation – Index of Economic Freedom	2010	29th	179	^{[unfit]}
World Bank – Ease of Doing Business Index	2008–2009	26th	183	
World Bank – International Logistics Performance Index (LPI)	2010	45th	155	
World Economic Forum – Networked Readiness Index	2008–2009	35th	134	
World Economic Forum – Travel and Tourism Competitiveness Index	2010	47th	139	
World Economic Forum – The Enabling Trade Index	2009	49th	121	
World Economic Forum – The Global Competitiveness Index	2009–2010	53rd	133	
World Economic Forum – Global Gender Gap Report	2009	30th	134	
World Intellectual Property Organization – Global Innovation Index	2026	32	139	

== International rankings ==
The following are links to international rankings of Lithuania from selected research institutes and foundations including economic output and various composite indexes.

Index	Rank	Countries reviewed
Climate Change Performance Index 2019	6th^{(first 3 places not nominated)}	60
Social Progress Index 2020	32nd	163
IMD Talent Ranking 2020	27th	63
Index of Economic Freedom 2021	15th	178
Ease of Doing Business Index 2020	11th	190
EF English Proficiency Index 2019	21st	100
Logistics Performance Index 2018	54th	160
Inequality adjusted Human Development Index 2019	31st	150
Networked Readiness Index 2019	31st	121
Corruption Perceptions Index 2020	35th	180
Globalization Index 2015	35th	207
Reporters Without Borders Press Freedom Index 2020	28th	180
Human Development Index 2019	34th	189
Global Peace Index 2018	36th	163
Transformation Index BTI 2018	4th	129
Legatum Prosperity Index 2020	34th	167
European Innovation Scoreboard (in EU context) 2017	15th	28
UN World Happiness Report 2017–2019	41st	153
Euro health consumer index 2018	28th	35
ITU Cybersecurity Index 2018	4th	175
OECD Better Life Index 2020	28th	40
Perceptions of Electoral Integrity Index 2019	11th	167
