= List of birds of Lithuania =

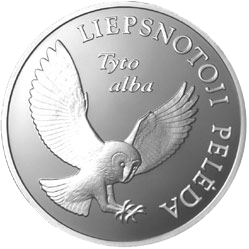
Litas commemorative coin depicting a barn owl.

This is a list of the bird species recorded in Lithuania. The avifauna of Lithuania include a total of 396 species, of which 5 have been introduced by human. 21 species are globally threatened.

This list's taxonomic treatment (designation and sequence of orders, families and species) and nomenclature (common and scientific names) follow the conventions of The Clements Checklist of Birds of the World, 2022 edition. The family accounts at the beginning of each heading reflect this taxonomy, as do the species counts found in each family account. Introduced and accidental species are included in the total counts for Lithuania.

The following tags have been used to highlight several categories. The commonly occurring native species do not fall into any of these categories.

- (A) Accidental - a species that rarely or accidentally occurs in Lithuania
- (I) Introduced - a species introduced to Lithuania as a consequence, direct or indirect, of human actions
- (Ex) Extirpated - a species that no longer occurs in Lithuania although populations exist elsewhere

== Ducks, geese, and waterfowl ==
Order: Anseriformes Family: Anatidae

Anatidae includes the ducks and most duck-like waterfowl, such as geese and swans. These birds are adapted to an aquatic existence with webbed feet, flattened bills, and feathers that are excellent at shedding water due to an oily coating.

- Bar-headed goose, Anser indicus (A) LC
- Graylag goose, Anser anser LC
- Greater white-fronted goose, Anser albifrons LC
- Lesser white-fronted goose, Anser erythropus (A) VU
- Taiga bean goose, Anser fabalis (A) LC
- Tundra bean goose, Anser serrirostris NE
- Pink-footed goose, Anser brachyrhynchus (A) LC
- Brant (goose), Branta bernicla LC
- Barnacle goose, Branta leucopsis LC
- Canada goose, Branta canadensis (A) LC
- Red-breasted goose, Branta ruficollis (A) VU
- Mute swan, Cygnus olor LC
- Black swan, Cygnus atratus (I) LC
- Tundra swan, Cygnus columbianus LC
- Whooper swan, Cygnus cygnus LC
- Egyptian goose, Alopochen aegyptiaca (I) LC
- Ruddy shelduck, Tadorna ferruginea (A) LC
- Common shelduck, Tadorna tadorna LC
- Wood duck, Aix sponsa (I) LC
- Mandarin duck, Aix galericulata (I) LC
- Garganey, Spatula querquedula LC
- Northern shoveler, Spatula clypeata LC
- Gadwall, Mareca strepera LC
- Eurasian wigeon, Mareca penelope (A) LC
- American wigeon, Mareca americana (A) LC
- Mallard, Anas platyrhynchos LC
- Northern pintail, Anas acuta (A) LC
- Eurasian teal, Anas crecca LC
- Red-crested pochard, Netta rufina (A) LC
- Common pochard, Aythya ferina VU
- Ferruginous duck, Aythya nyroca (A) NT
- Tufted duck, Aythya fuligula NT
- Greater scaup, Aythya marila LC
- Steller's eider, Polysticta stelleri VU
- King eider, Somateria spectabilis (A) LC
- Common eider, Somateria mollissima NT
- Harlequin duck, Histrionicus histrionicus (A) LC
- Velvet scoter, Melanitta fusca VU
- Common scoter, Melanitta nigra LC
- Long-tailed duck, Clangula hyemalis VU
- Common goldeneye, Bucephala clangula LC
- Smew, Mergellus albellus LC
- Common merganser, Mergus merganser LC
- Red-breasted merganser, Mergus serrator (A) LC
- White-headed duck, Oxyura leucocephala (A) EN

== Pheasants, grouse, and allies ==
Order: Galliformes Family: Phasianidae

The Phasianidae are a family of terrestrial birds. In general, they are plump (although they vary in size) and have broad, relatively short wings.

- Common quail, Coturnix coturnix NT
- Common pheasant, Phasianus colchicus (I) LC
- Gray partridge, Perdix perdix LC
- Western capercaillie, Tetrao urogallus LC
- Black grouse, Lyrurus tetrix LC
- Hazel grouse, Tetrastes bonasia LC
- Willow ptarmigan, Lagopus lagopus (A) LC

== Flamingos ==
Order: Phoenicopteriformes Family: Phoenicopteridae

Flamingos are gregarious wading birds, usually 3 to 5 feet (0.9 to 1.5 m) tall, found in both the Western and Eastern Hemispheres. Flamingos filter-feed on shellfish and algae. Their oddly shaped beaks are specially adapted to separate mud and silt from the food they consume and, uniquely, are used upside-down.

- Greater flamingo, Phoenicopterus roseus (A) LC

== Grebes ==
Order: Podicipediformes Family: Podicipedidae

Grebes are small to medium-large freshwater diving birds. They have lobed toes and are excellent swimmers and divers. However, they have their feet placed far back on the body, making them quite ungainly on land.

- Little grebe, Tachybaptus ruficollis LC
- Horned grebe, Podiceps auritus (A) VU
- Red-necked grebe, Podiceps grisegena LC
- Great crested grebe, Podiceps cristatus LC
- Eared grebe, Podiceps nigricollis (A) LC

== Pigeons and doves ==
Order: Columbiformes Family: Columbidae

Pigeons and doves are stout-bodied birds with short necks and short slender bills with a fleshy cere.

- Rock pigeon, Columba livia LC
- Stock dove, Columba oenas LC
- Common wood-pigeon, Columba palumbus LC
- European turtle-dove, Streptopelia turtur VU
- Oriental turtle-dove, Streptopelia orientalis (A) LC
- Eurasian collared-dove, Streptopelia decaocto LC
- Namaqua dove, Oena capensis (A) LC

== Sandgrouse ==
Order: Pterocliformes Family: Pteroclidae

Sandgrouse have small, pigeon like heads and necks, but sturdy compact bodies. They have long pointed wings and sometimes tails and a fast direct flight. Flocks fly to watering holes at dawn and dusk. Their legs are feathered down to the toes.

- Pallas's sandgrouse, Syrrhaptes paradoxus (A) LC

== Bustards ==
Order: Otidiformes Family: Otididae

Bustards are large terrestrial birds mainly associated with dry open country and steppes in the Old World. They are omnivorous and nest on the ground. They walk steadily on strong legs and big toes, pecking for food as they go. They have long broad wings with "fingered" wingtips and striking patterns in flight. Many have interesting mating displays.

- Great bustard, Otis tarda (A) EN
- MacQueen's bustard, Chlamydotis macqueenii (A) VU
- Little bustard, Tetrax tetrax (A) NT

== Cuckoos ==
Order: Cuculiformes Family: Cuculidae

The family Cuculidae includes cuckoos, roadrunners and anis. These birds are of variable size with slender bodies, long tails and strong legs. The Old World cuckoos are brood parasites.

- Common cuckoo, Cuculus canorus LC

== Nightjars and allies ==
Order: Caprimulgiformes Family: Caprimulgidae

Nightjars are medium-sized nocturnal birds that usually nest on the ground. They have long wings, short legs and very short bills. Most have small feet, of little use for walking, and long pointed wings. Their soft plumage is camouflaged to resemble bark or leaves.

- Eurasian nightjar, Caprimulgus europaeus LC

== Swifts ==
Order: Caprimulgiformes Family: Apodidae

Swifts are small birds which spend the majority of their lives flying. These birds have very short legs and never settle voluntarily on the ground, perching instead only on vertical surfaces. Many swifts have long swept-back wings which resemble a crescent or boomerang.

- Alpine swift, Apus melba (A) LC
- Common swift, Apus apus NT
- Pallid swift, Apus pallidus (A) LC

== Rails, gallinules, and coots ==
Order: Gruiformes Family: Rallidae

Rallidae is a large family of small to medium-sized birds which includes the rails, crakes, coots and gallinules. Typically they inhabit dense vegetation in damp environments near lakes, swamps or rivers. In general they are shy and secretive birds, making them difficult to observe. Most species have strong legs and long toes which are well adapted to soft uneven surfaces. They tend to have short, rounded wings and to be weak fliers.

- Water rail, Rallus aquaticus LC
- Corn crake, Crex crex LC
- Spotted crake, Porzana porzana LC
- Eurasian moorhen, Gallinula chloropus LC
- Eurasian coot, Fulica atra LC
- Little crake, Zapornia parva LC
- Baillon's crake, Zapornia pusilla (A) LC

== Cranes ==
Order: Gruiformes Family: Gruidae

Cranes are large, long-legged and long-necked birds. Unlike the similar-looking but unrelated herons, cranes fly with necks outstretched, not pulled back. Most have elaborate and noisy courting displays or "dances".

- Sandhill crane, Antigone canadensis (A) LC
- Common crane, Grus grus LC

== Thick-knees ==
Order: Charadriiformes Family: Burhinidae

The thick-knees are a group of largely tropical waders in the family Burhinidae. They are found worldwide within the tropical zone, with some species also breeding in temperate Europe and Australia. They are medium to large waders with strong black or yellow-black bills, large yellow eyes and cryptic plumage. Despite being classed as waders, most species have a preference for arid or semi-arid habitats.

- Eurasian thick-knee, Burhinus oedicnemus (A) LC

== Stilts and avocets ==
Order: Charadriiformes Family: Recurvirostridae

Recurvirostridae is a family of large wading birds, which includes the avocets and stilts. The avocets have long legs and long up-curved bills. The stilts have extremely long legs and long, thin, straight bills.

- Black-winged stilt, Himantopus himantopus (A) LC
- Pied avocet, Recurvirostra avosetta (A) LC

== Oystercatchers ==
Order: Charadriiformes Family: Haematopodidae

The oystercatchers are large and noisy plover-like birds, with strong bills used for smashing or prising open molluscs.

- Eurasian oystercatcher, Haematopus ostralegus (A) NT

== Plovers and lapwings ==
Order: Charadriiformes Family: Charadriidae

The family Charadriidae includes the plovers, dotterels and lapwings. They are small to medium-sized birds with compact bodies, short, thick necks and long, usually pointed, wings. They are found in open country worldwide, mostly in habitats near water.

- Black-bellied plover, Pluvialis squatarola LC
- European golden-plover, Pluvialis apricaria LC
- American golden-plover, Pluvialis dominica (A) LC
- Pacific golden-plover, Pluvialis fulva (A) LC
- Northern lapwing, Vanellus vanellus NT
- White-tailed lapwing, Vanellus leucurus (A) LC
- Kentish plover, Charadrius alexandrinus (A) LC
- Common ringed plover, Charadrius hiaticula (A) LC
- Little ringed plover, Charadrius dubius LC
- Eurasian dotterel, Charadrius morinellus (A) LC

== Sandpipers and allies ==
Order: Charadriiformes Family: Scolopacidae

Scolopacidae is a large diverse family of small to medium-sized shorebirds including the sandpipers, curlews, godwits, shanks, tattlers, woodcocks, snipes, dowitchers and phalaropes. The majority of these species eat small invertebrates picked out of the mud or soil. Variation in length of legs and bills enables multiple species to feed in the same habitat, particularly on the coast, without direct competition for food.

- Whimbrel, Numenius phaeopus LC
- Eurasian curlew, Numenius arquata NT
- Bar-tailed godwit, Limosa lapponica NT
- Black-tailed godwit, Limosa limosa NT
- Ruddy turnstone, Arenaria interpres LC
- Red knot, Calidris canutus NT
- Ruff, Calidris pugnax NT
- Broad-billed sandpiper, Calidris falcinellus LC
- Curlew sandpiper, Calidris ferruginea NT
- Temminck's stint, Calidris temminckii LC
- Sanderling, Calidris alba LC
- Dunlin, Calidris alpina (A) LC
- Purple sandpiper, Calidris maritima (A) LC
- Little stint, Calidris minuta LC
- Pectoral sandpiper, Calidris melanotos (A) LC
- Long-billed dowitcher, Limnodromus scolopaceus (A) LC
- Jack snipe, Lymnocryptes minimus (A) LC
- Eurasian woodcock, Scolopax rusticola LC
- Great snipe, Gallinago media NT
- Common snipe, Gallinago gallinago LC
- Terek sandpiper, Xenus cinereus (A) LC
- Red-necked phalarope, Phalaropus lobatus LC
- Red phalarope, Phalaropus fulicarius (A) LC
- Common sandpiper, Actitis hypoleucos LC
- Spotted sandpiper, Actitis macularius (A) LC
- Green sandpiper, Tringa ochropus LC
- Spotted redshank, Tringa erythropus LC
- Common greenshank, Tringa nebularia LC
- Marsh sandpiper, Tringa stagnatilis (A) LC
- Wood sandpiper, Tringa glareola LC
- Common redshank, Tringa totanus VU

== Pratincoles and coursers ==
Order: Charadriiformes Family: Glareolidae

Glareolidae is a family of wading birds comprising the pratincoles, which have short legs, long pointed wings, and long forked tails, and the coursers, which have long legs, short wings, and long, pointed bills which curve downwards.

- Black-winged pratincole, Glareola nordmanni (A) NT

== Skuas and jaegers ==
Order: Charadriiformes Family: Stercorariidae

The family Stercorariidae are, in general, medium to large birds, typically with grey or brown plumage, often with white markings on the wings. They nest on the ground in temperate and arctic regions and are long-distance migrants.

- Great skua, Stercorarius skua (A) LC
- Pomarine jaeger, Stercorarius pomarinus (A) LC
- Parasitic jaeger, Stercorarius parasiticus EN
- Long-tailed jaeger, Stercorarius longicaudus (A) LC

== Auks, murres, and puffins ==
Order: Charadriiformes Family: Alcidae

Alcids are superficially similar to penguins due to their black-and-white colours, their upright posture and some of their habits, however they are not related to the penguins and differ in being able to fly. Auks live on the open sea, only deliberately coming ashore to nest.

- Dovekie, Alle alle (A) LC
- Common murre, Uria aalge LC
- Razorbill, Alca torda LC
- Black guillemot, Cepphus grylle LC
- Atlantic puffin, Fratercula arctica (A) VU

== Gulls, terns, and skimmers ==
Order: Charadriiformes Family: Laridae

Laridae is a family of medium to large seabirds, the gulls, terns, and skimmers. Gulls are typically grey or white, often with black markings on the head or wings. They have stout, longish bills and webbed feet. Terns are a group of generally medium to large seabirds typically with grey or white plumage, often with black markings on the head. Most terns hunt fish by diving but some pick insects off the surface of fresh water. Terns are generally long-lived birds, with several species known to live in excess of 30 years.

- Black-legged kittiwake, Rissa tridactyla (A) VU
- Sabine's gull, Xema sabini (A) LC
- Slender-billed gull, Chroicocephalus genei (A) LC
- Bonaparte's gull, Chroicocephalus philadelphia (A) LC
- Black-headed gull, Chroicocephalus ridibundus LC
- Little gull, Hydrocoloeus minutus LC
- Ross's gull, Rhodostethia rosea (A) LC
- Laughing gull, Leucophaeus atricilla (A) LC
- Mediterranean gull, Ichthyaetus melanocephalus (A) LC
- Pallas's gull, Ichthyaetus ichthyaetus (A) LC
- Common gull, Larus canus LC
- Ring-billed gull, Larus delawarensis (A) LC
- Herring gull, Larus argentatus LC
- Yellow-legged gull, Larus michahellis LC
- Caspian gull, Larus cachinnans LC
- Iceland gull, Larus glaucoides (A) LC
- Lesser black-backed gull, Larus fuscus LC
- Slaty-backed gull, Larus schistisagus (A) LC
- Glaucous gull, Larus hyperboreus (A) LC
- Great black-backed gull, Larus marinus LC
- Little tern, Sternula albifrons LC
- Caspian tern, Hydroprogne caspia LC
- Black tern, Chlidonias niger LC
- White-winged tern, Chlidonias leucopterus LC
- Whiskered tern, Chlidonias hybrida LC
- Common tern, Sterna hirundo LC
- Arctic tern, Sterna paradisaea (A) LC
- Sandwich tern, Thalasseus sandvicensis LC

== Loons ==
Order: Gaviiformes Family: Gaviidae

Loons, known as divers in Europe, are a group of aquatic birds found in many parts of North America and northern Europe. They are the size of a large duck or small goose, which they somewhat resemble when swimming, but to which they are completely unrelated.

- Red-throated loon, Gavia stellata LC
- Arctic loon, Gavia arctica (A) LC
- Common loon, Gavia immer (A) LC
- Yellow-billed loon, Gavia adamsii (A) NT

== Northern storm-petrels ==
Order: Procellariiformes Family: Hydrobatidae

The northern storm-petrels are relatives of the petrels and are the smallest seabirds. They feed on planktonic crustaceans and small fish picked from the surface, typically while hovering. The flight is fluttering and sometimes bat-like.

- Leach's storm-petrel, Hydrobates leucorhous (A) VU

== Shearwaters and petrels ==
Order: Procellariiformes Family: Procellariidae

The procellariids are the main group of medium-sized "true petrels", characterised by united nostrils with medium septum and a long outer functional primary.

- Sooty shearwater, Ardenna grisea (A) NT

== Storks ==
Order: Ciconiiformes Family: Ciconiidae

Storks are large, long-legged, long-necked, wading birds with long, stout bills. Storks are mute, but bill-clattering is an important mode of communication at the nest. Their nests can be large and may be reused for many years. Many species are migratory.

- Black stork, Ciconia nigra LC
- White stork, Ciconia ciconia LC

== Boobies and gannets ==
Order: Suliformes Family: Sulidae

The sulids comprise the gannets and boobies. Both groups are medium to large coastal seabirds that plunge-dive for fish.

- Northern gannet, Morus bassanus LC

== Cormorants ==
Order: Suliformes Family: Phalacrocoracidae

Phalacrocoracidae is a family of medium to large coastal, fish-eating seabirds that includes cormorants and shags. Plumage colouration varies, with the majority having mainly dark plumage, some species being black-and-white and a few being colourful.

- Pygmy cormorant, Microcarbo pygmeus (A) LC
- Great cormorant, Phalacrocorax carbo LC
- European shag, Gulosus aristotelis (A) LC

== Pelicans ==
Order: Pelecaniformes Family: Pelecanidae

Pelicans are large water birds with a distinctive pouch under their beak. As with other members of the order Pelecaniformes, they have webbed feet with four toes.

- Great white pelican, Pelecanus onocrotalus (A) LC
- Dalmatian pelican, Pelecanus crispus (A) NT

== Herons, egrets, and bitterns ==
Order: Pelecaniformes Family: Ardeidae

The family Ardeidae contains the bitterns, herons and egrets. Herons and egrets are medium to large wading birds with long necks and legs. Bitterns tend to be shorter necked and more wary. Members of Ardeidae fly with their necks retracted, unlike other long-necked birds such as storks, ibises and spoonbills.

- Great bittern, Botaurus stellaris LC
- Little bittern, Ixobrychus minutus (A) LC
- Gray heron, Ardea cinerea LC
- Purple heron, Ardea purpurea (A) LC
- Great egret, Ardea alba LC
- Little egret, Egretta garzetta (A) LC
- Cattle egret, Bubulcus ibis (A) LC
- Black-crowned night-heron, Nycticorax nycticorax (A) LC

== Ibises and spoonbills ==
Order: Pelecaniformes Family: Threskiornithidae

Threskiornithidae is a family of large terrestrial and wading birds which includes the ibises and spoonbills. They have long, broad wings with 11 primary and about 20 secondary feathers. They are strong fliers and despite their size and weight, very capable soarers.

- Glossy ibis, Plegadis falcinellus (A) LC
- African sacred ibis, Threskiornis aethiopicus (A) LC
- Eurasian spoonbill, Platalea leucorodia (A) LC

== Osprey ==
Order: Accipitriformes Family: Pandionidae

The family Pandionidae contains only one species, the osprey. The osprey is a medium-large raptor which is a specialist fish-eater with a worldwide distribution.

- Osprey, Pandion haliaetus LC

== Hawks, eagles, and kites ==
Order: Accipitriformes Family: Accipitridae

Accipitridae is a family of birds of prey, which includes hawks, eagles, kites, harriers and Old World vultures. These birds have powerful hooked beaks for tearing flesh from their prey, strong legs, powerful talons and keen eyesight.

- Black-winged kite, Elanus caeruleus (A) LC
- European honey-buzzard, Pernis apivorus LC
- Eurasian griffon, Gyps fulvus (A) LC
- Short-toed snake-eagle, Circaetus gallicus (A) LC
- Lesser spotted eagle, Clanga pomarina LC
- Greater spotted eagle, Clanga clanga (Ex) VU
- Booted eagle, Hieraaetus pennatus (A) LC
- Steppe eagle, Aquila nipalensis (A) EN
- Imperial eagle, Aquila heliaca (A) VU
- Golden eagle, Aquila chrysaetos (Ex) LC
- Bonelli's eagle, Aquila fasciata (A) LC
- Eurasian marsh-harrier, Circus aeruginosus LC
- Hen harrier, Circus cyaneus (A) LC
- Pallid harrier, Circus macrourus (A) NT
- Montagu's harrier, Circus pygargus LC
- Eurasian sparrowhawk, Accipiter nisus LC
- Eurasian goshawk, Accipiter gentilis LC
- Red kite, Milvus milvus LC
- Black kite, Milvus migrans LC
- White-tailed eagle, Haliaeetus albicilla LC
- Rough-legged hawk, Buteo lagopus LC
- Common buzzard, Buteo buteo LC
- Long-legged buzzard, Buteo rufinus (A) LC

== Barn-owls ==
Order: Strigiformes Family: Tytonidae

Barn-owls are medium to large owls with large heads and characteristic heart-shaped faces. They have long strong legs with powerful talons.

- Western barn owl, Tyto alba LC

== Owls ==
Order: Strigiformes Family: Strigidae

The typical owls are small to large solitary nocturnal birds of prey. They have large forward-facing eyes and ears, a hawk-like beak and a conspicuous circle of feathers around each eye called a facial disk.

- Eurasian scops owl, Otus scops (A) LC
- Eurasian eagle-owl, Bubo bubo (A) LC
- Snowy owl, Bubo scandiacus (A) VU
- Northern hawk owl, Surnia ulula (A) LC
- Eurasian pygmy-owl, Glaucidium passerinum LC
- Little owl, Athene noctua (A) LC
- Tawny owl, Strix aluco LC
- Ural owl, Strix uralensis (A) LC
- Great gray owl, Strix nebulosa (A) LC
- Long-eared owl, Asio otus LC
- Short-eared owl, Asio flammeus (A) LC
- Boreal owl, Aegolius funereus LC

== Hoopoes ==
Order: Bucerotiformes Family: Upupidae

Hoopoes have black, white and orangey-pink colouring with a large erectile crest on their head.

- Eurasian hoopoe, Upupa epops LC

== Kingfishers ==
Order: Coraciiformes Family: Alcedinidae

Kingfishers are medium-sized birds with large heads, long, pointed bills, short legs and stubby tails.

- Common kingfisher, Alcedo atthis LC

== Bee-eaters ==
Order: Coraciiformes Family: Meropidae

The bee-eaters are a group of coraciiform birds in the family Meropidae. Most species are found in Africa but others occur in southern Europe, Madagascar, Australia and New Guinea. They are characterised by richly coloured plumage, slender bodies and usually elongated central tail feathers. All are colourful and have long downturned bills and pointed wings, which give them a swallow-like appearance when seen from afar.

- European bee-eater, Merops apiaster (A) LC

== Rollers ==
Order: Coraciiformes Family: Coraciidae

Rollers resemble crows in size and build, but are more closely related to the kingfishers and bee-eaters. They share the colourful appearance of those groups with blues and browns predominating. The two inner front toes are connected, but the outer toe is not.

- European roller, Coracias garrulus (A) LC

== Woodpeckers ==
Order: Piciformes Family: Picidae

Woodpeckers are small to medium-sized birds with chisel-like beaks, short legs, stiff tails and long tongues used for capturing insects. Some species have feet with two toes pointing forward and two backward, while several species have only three toes. Many woodpeckers have the habit of tapping noisily on tree trunks with their beaks.

- Eurasian wryneck, Jynx torquilla LC
- Eurasian three-toed woodpecker, Picoides tridactylus LC
- Middle spotted woodpecker, Dendrocoptes medius LC
- White-backed woodpecker, Dendrocopos leucotos LC
- Great spotted woodpecker, Dendrocopos major LC
- Syrian woodpecker, Dendrocopos syriacus (A) LC
- Lesser spotted woodpecker, Dryobates minor LC
- Gray-headed woodpecker, Picus canus LC
- Eurasian green woodpecker, Picus viridis LC
- Black woodpecker, Dryocopus martius LC

== Falcons and caracaras ==
Order: Falconiformes Family: Falconidae

Falconidae is a family of diurnal birds of prey. They differ from hawks, eagles and kites in that they kill with their beaks instead of their talons.

- Lesser kestrel, Falco naumanni (A) LC
- Eurasian kestrel, Falco tinnunculus LC
- Red-footed falcon, Falco vespertinus (A) LC
- Eleonora's falcon, Falco eleonorae (A) LC
- Merlin, Falco columbarius (A) LC
- Eurasian hobby, Falco subbuteo LC
- Saker falcon, Falco cherrug (A) EN
- Gyrfalcon, Falco rusticolus (A) LC
- Peregrine falcon, Falco peregrinus LC

== Old World parrots ==
Order: Psittaciformes Family: Psittaculidae

Characteristic features of parrots include a strong curved bill, an upright stance, strong legs, and clawed zygodactyl feet. Many parrots are vividly colored, and some are multi-colored. In size they range from 8 cm (3.1 in) to 1 m (3.3 ft) in length. Old World parrots are found from Africa east across south and southeast Asia and Oceania to Australia and New Zealand.

- Rose-ringed parakeet, Psittacula krameri (I) LC

== Old World orioles ==
Order: Passeriformes Family: Oriolidae

The Old World orioles are colourful passerine birds. They are not related to the New World orioles.

- Eurasian golden oriole, Oriolus oriolus LC

== Shrikes ==
Order: Passeriformes Family: Laniidae

Shrikes are passerine birds known for their habit of catching other birds and small animals and impaling the uneaten portions of their bodies on thorns. A typical shrike's beak is hooked, like a bird of prey.

- Red-backed shrike, Lanius collurio LC
- Isabelline shrike, Lanius isabellinus (A) LC
- Northern shrike, Lanius borealis (A) LC
- Great gray shrike, Lanius excubitor LC
- Lesser gray shrike, Lanius minor (A) LC

== Crows, jays, and magpies ==
Order: Passeriformes Family: Corvidae

The family Corvidae includes crows, ravens, jays, choughs, magpies, treepies, nutcrackers and ground jays. Corvids are above average in size among the Passeriformes, and some of the larger species show high levels of intelligence.

- Siberian jay, Perisoreus infaustus (A) LC
- Eurasian jay, Garrulus glandarius LC
- Eurasian magpie, Pica pica LC
- Eurasian nutcracker, Nucifraga caryocatactes LC
- Eurasian jackdaw, Corvus monedula LC
- Rook, Corvus frugilegus LC
- Carrion crow, Corvus corone LC
- Hooded crow, Corvus cornix NE
- Common raven, Corvus corax LC

== Tits, chickadees, and titmice ==
Order: Passeriformes Family: Paridae

The Paridae are mainly small stocky woodland species with short stout bills. Some have crests. They are adaptable birds, with a mixed diet including seeds and insects.

- Coal tit, Periparus ater LC
- Crested tit, Lophophanes cristatus LC
- Marsh tit, Poecile palustris LC
- Willow tit, Poecile montana LC
- Eurasian blue tit, Cyanistes caeruleus LC
- Azure tit, Cyanistes cyanus LC
- Great tit, Parus major LC

== Penduline-tits ==
Order: Passeriformes Family: Remizidae

The penduline-tits are a group of small passerine birds related to the true tits. They are insectivores.

- Eurasian penduline-tit, Remiz pendulinus LC

== Larks ==
Order: Passeriformes Family: Alaudidae

Larks are small terrestrial birds with often extravagant songs and display flights. Most larks are fairly dull in appearance. Their food is insects and seeds.

- Horned lark, Eremophila alpestris LC
- Greater short-toed lark, Calandrella brachydactyla (A) LC
- Calandra lark, Melanocorypha calandra (A) LC
- Wood lark, Lullula arborea LC
- Eurasian skylark, Alauda arvensis LC
- Crested lark, Galerida cristata (A) LC

== Bearded reedling ==
Order: Passeriformes Family: Panuridae

This species, the only one in its family, is found in reed beds throughout temperate Europe and Asia.

- Bearded reedling, Panurus biarmicus LC

== Reed warblers and allies ==
Order: Passeriformes Family: Acrocephalidae

The members of this family are usually rather large for "warblers". Most are rather plain olivaceous brown above with much yellow to beige below. They are usually found in open woodland, reedbeds, or tall grass. The family occurs mostly in southern to western Eurasia and surroundings, but it also ranges far into the Pacific, with some species in Africa.

- Booted warbler, Iduna caligata (A) LC
- Icterine warbler, Hippolais icterina LC
- Aquatic warbler, Acrocephalus paludicola VU
- Sedge warbler, Acrocephalus schoenobaenus LC
- Paddyfield warbler, Acrocephalus agricola (A) LC
- Blyth's reed warbler, Acrocephalus dumetorum (A) LC
- Marsh warbler, Acrocephalus palustris LC
- Eurasian reed warbler, Acrocephalus scirpaceus LC
- Great reed warbler, Acrocephalus arundinaceus LC

== Grassbirds and allies ==
Order: Passeriformes Family: Locustellidae

Locustellidae are a family of small insectivorous songbirds found mainly in Eurasia, Africa, and the Australian region. They are smallish birds with tails that are usually long and pointed, and tend to be drab brownish or buffy all over.

- River warbler, Locustella fluviatilis LC
- Savi's warbler, Locustella luscinioides LC
- Common grasshopper-warbler, Locustella naevia LC

== Swallows ==
Order: Passeriformes Family: Hirundinidae

The family Hirundinidae is adapted to aerial feeding. They have a slender streamlined body, long pointed wings and a short bill with a wide gape. The feet are adapted to perching rather than walking, and the front toes are partially joined at the base.

- Bank swallow, Riparia riparia LC
- Barn swallow, Hirundo rustica LC
- Red-rumped swallow, Cecropis daurica (A) LC
- Common house-martin, Delichon urbicum LCLC
- Asian house-martin, Delichon dasypus (A) LC

== Leaf warblers ==
Order: Passeriformes Family: Phylloscopidae

Leaf warblers are a family of small insectivorous birds found mostly in Eurasia and ranging into Wallacea and Africa. The species are of various sizes, often green-plumaged above and yellow below, or more subdued with grayish-green to grayish-brown colors.

- Wood warbler, Phylloscopus sibilatrix LC
- Yellow-browed warbler, Phylloscopus inornatus (A) LC
- Hume's warbler, Phylloscopus humei (A) LC
- Pallas's leaf warbler, Phylloscopus proregulus (A) LC
- Radde's warbler, Phylloscopus schwarzi (A) LC
- Dusky warbler, Phylloscopus fuscatus (A) LC
- Willow warbler, Phylloscopus trochilus LC
- Common chiffchaff, Phylloscopus collybita LC
- Iberian chiffchaff, Phylloscopus ibericus (A) LC
- Greenish warbler, Phylloscopus trochiloides LC
- Arctic warbler, Phylloscopus borealis (A) LC

== Long-tailed tits ==
Order: Passeriformes Family: Aegithalidae

Long-tailed tits are a group of small passerine birds with medium to long tails. They make woven bag nests in trees. Most eat a mixed diet which includes insects.

- Long-tailed tit, Aegithalos caudatus LC

== Sylviid warblers, parrotbills, and allies ==
Order: Passeriformes Family: Sylviidae

The family Sylviidae is a group of small insectivorous passerine birds. They mainly occur as breeding species, as the common name implies, in Europe, Asia and, to a lesser extent, Africa. Most are of generally undistinguished appearance, but many have distinctive songs.

- Eurasian blackcap, Sylvia atricapilla LC
- Garden warbler, Sylvia borin LC
- Barred warbler, Curruca nisoria LC
- Lesser whitethroat, Curruca curruca LC
- Eastern subalpine warbler, Curruca cantillans (A) LC
- Sardinian warbler, Curruca melanocephala (A) LC
- Greater whitethroat, Curruca communis LC

== Kinglets ==
Order: Passeriformes Family: Regulidae

The kinglets, also called crests, are a small group of birds often included in the Old World warblers, but frequently given family status because they also resemble the titmice.

- Goldcrest, Regulus regulus LC
- Common firecrest, Regulus ignicapilla (A) LC

== Nuthatches ==
Order: Passeriformes Family: Sittidae

Nuthatches are small woodland birds. They have the unusual ability to climb down trees head first, unlike other birds which can only go upwards. Nuthatches have big heads, short tails and powerful bills and feet.

- Eurasian nuthatch, Sitta europaea LC

== Treecreepers ==
Order: Passeriformes Family: Certhiidae

Treecreepers are small woodland birds, brown above and white below. They have thin pointed down-curved bills, which they use to extricate insects from bark. They have stiff tail feathers, like woodpeckers, which they use to support themselves on vertical trees.

- Eurasian treecreeper, Certhia familiaris LC
- Short-toed treecreeper, Certhia brachydactyla (A) LC

== Wrens ==
Order: Passeriformes Family: Troglodytidae

The wrens are mainly small and inconspicuous except for their loud songs. These birds have short wings and thin down-turned bills. Several species often hold their tails upright. All are insectivorous.

- Eurasian wren, Troglodytes troglodytes LC

== Dippers ==
Order: Passeriformes Family: Cinclidae

Dippers are a group of perching birds whose habitat includes aquatic environments in the Americas, Europe and Asia. They are named for their bobbing or dipping movements.

- White-throated dipper, Cinclus cinclus LC

== Starlings ==
Order: Passeriformes Family: Sturnidae

Starlings are small to medium-sized passerine birds. Their flight is strong and direct and they are very gregarious. Their preferred habitat is fairly open country. They eat insects and fruit. Plumage is typically dark with a metallic sheen.

- European starling, Sturnus vulgaris LC
- Rosy starling, Pastor roseus (A) LC

== Thrushes and allies ==
Order: Passeriformes Family: Turdidae

The thrushes are a group of passerine birds that occur mainly in the Old World. They are plump, soft plumaged, small to medium-sized insectivores or sometimes omnivores, often feeding on the ground. Many have attractive songs.

- Mistle thrush, Turdus viscivorus LC
- Song thrush, Turdus philomelos LC
- Redwing, Turdus iliacus NT
- Eurasian blackbird, Turdus merula LC
- Fieldfare, Turdus pilaris LC
- Ring ouzel, Turdus torquatus LC

== Old World flycatchers ==
Order: Passeriformes Family: Muscicapidae

Old World flycatchers are a large group of small passerine birds native to the Old World. They are mainly small arboreal insectivores. The appearance of these birds is highly varied, but they mostly have weak songs and harsh calls.

- Spotted flycatcher, Muscicapa striata LC
- European robin, Erithacus rubecula LC
- Thrush nightingale, Luscinia luscinia LC
- Common nightingale, Luscinia megarhynchos (A) LC
- Bluethroat, Luscinia svecica LC
- Red-flanked bluetail, Tarsiger cyanurus (A) LC
- Red-breasted flycatcher, Ficedula parva LC
- European pied flycatcher, Ficedula hypoleuca LC
- Collared flycatcher, Ficedula albicollis (A) LC
- Common redstart, Phoenicurus phoenicurus LC
- Black redstart, Phoenicurus ochruros LC
- Whinchat, Saxicola rubetra LC
- European stonechat, Saxicola rubicola (A) NE
- Siberian stonechat, Saxicola maurus (A) NE
- Northern wheatear, Oenanthe oenanthe LC
- Isabelline wheatear, Oenanthe isabellina (A) LC
- Desert wheatear, Oenanthe deserti (A) LC
- Pied wheatear, Oenanthe pleschanka (A) LC

== Waxwings ==
Order: Passeriformes Family: Bombycillidae

The waxwings are a group of birds with soft silky plumage and unique red tips to some of the wing feathers. In the Bohemian and cedar waxwings, these tips look like sealing wax and give the group its name. These are arboreal birds of northern forests. They live on insects in summer and berries in winter.

- Bohemian waxwing, Bombycilla garrulus LC

== Accentors ==
Order: Passeriformes Family: Prunellidae

The accentors are in the only bird family, Prunellidae, which is completely endemic to the Palearctic. They are small, fairly drab species superficially similar to sparrows.

- Siberian accentor, Prunella montanella (A) LC
- Black-throated accentor, Prunella atrogularis (A) LC
- Dunnock, Prunella modularis LC

== Old World sparrows ==
Order: Passeriformes Family: Passeridae

Old World sparrows are small passerine birds. In general, sparrows tend to be small, plump, brown or grey birds with short tails and short powerful beaks. Sparrows are seed eaters, but they also consume small insects.

- House sparrow, Passer domesticus LC
- Eurasian tree sparrow, Passer montanus LC

== Wagtails and pipits ==
Order: Passeriformes Family: Motacillidae

Motacillidae is a family of small passerine birds with medium to long tails. They include the wagtails, longclaws and pipits. They are slender, ground feeding insectivores of open country.

- Gray wagtail, Motacilla cinerea (A) LC
- Western yellow wagtail, Motacilla flava LC
- Citrine wagtail, Motacilla citreola LC
- White wagtail, Motacilla alba LC
- Richard's pipit, Anthus richardi (A) LC
- Tawny pipit, Anthus campestris LC
- Meadow pipit, Anthus pratensis LC
- Tree pipit, Anthus trivialis LC
- Olive-backed pipit, Anthus hodgsoni (A) LC
- Pechora pipit, Anthus gustavi (A) LC
- Red-throated pipit, Anthus cervinus LC
- Water pipit, Anthus spinoletta (A) LC
- Rock pipit, Anthus petrosus LC

== Finches, euphonias, and allies ==
Order: Passeriformes Family: Fringillidae

Finches are seed-eating passerine birds, that are small to moderately large and have a strong beak, usually conical and in some species very large. All have twelve tail feathers and nine primaries. These birds have a bouncing flight with alternating bouts of flapping and gliding on closed wings, and most sing well.

- Common chaffinch, Fringilla coelebs LC
- Brambling, Fringilla montifringilla (A) LC
- Hawfinch, Coccothraustes coccothraustes LC
- Common rosefinch, Carpodacus erythrinus LC
- Pine grosbeak, Pinicola enucleator (A) LC
- Eurasian bullfinch, Pyrrhula pyrrhula LC
- European greenfinch, Chloris chloris LC
- Twite, Linaria flavirostris (A) LC
- Eurasian linnet, Linaria cannabina LC
- Common redpoll, Acanthis flammea LC
- Lesser redpoll, Acanthis cabaret NE
- Hoary redpoll, Acanthis hornemanni (A) NE
- Parrot crossbill, Loxia pytyopsittacus (A) LC
- Red crossbill, Loxia curvirostra LC
- White-winged crossbill, Loxia leucoptera (A) LC
- European goldfinch, Carduelis carduelis LC
- European serin, Serinus serinus LC
- Eurasian siskin, Spinus spinus LC

== Longspurs and arctic buntings ==
Order: Passeriformes Family: Calcariidae

The Calcariidae are a family of birds that had been traditionally grouped with the New World sparrows, but differ in a number of respects and are usually found in open grassy areas.

- Lapland longspur, Calcarius lapponicus LC
- Snow bunting, Plectrophenax nivalis LC

== Old World buntings ==
Order: Passeriformes Family: Emberizidae

The emberizids are a large family of passerine birds. They are seed-eating birds with distinctively shaped bills. Many emberizid species have distinctive head patterns.

- Corn bunting, Emberiza calandra (A) LC
- Yellowhammer, Emberiza citrinella LC
- Pine bunting, Emberiza leucocephalos (A) LC
- Ortolan bunting, Emberiza hortulana LC
- Reed bunting, Emberiza schoeniclus LC
- Little bunting, Emberiza pusilla (A) LC
- Rustic bunting, Emberiza rustica (A) VU

== See also ==
- List of birds
- Lists of birds by region
