= Telecommunications in Lithuania =

Telecommunications in Lithuania include internet, radio, television, and telephony.

The Communications Regulatory Authority of the Republic of Lithuania (RRT) functions as the independent regulator for the country's electronic communications industry. Established under the Law on Telecommunications and the provisions with European Union Directives, its role is to facilitate a competitive environment within the industry.

The European Commission’s 2022 Digital Economy and Society Index (DESI) report evaluates Lithuania's digital progress among 27 EU nations. Ranking 23rd in overall connectivity, Lithuania stands out with Fixed Very High Capacity Network (VHCN) and Fiber-to-the-Premises (FTTP) coverage. In human capital, Lithuania ranks 20th, with a strength in digital skills. Notably, in the integration of digital technologies, Lithuania performs 13th, with advancements in Small and Medium-sized Enterprises (SMEs) and e-commerce. Digital public services earn the 10th rank, with about 95% online key public services as of 2026. Additionally, the country has focused on enhancing broadband infrastructure, particularly in less urban areas. Efforts in cybersecurity and the development of smart city solutions are also highlighted.

== Internet and digital progress ==
=== Users and skills ===
In 2022, internet usage among individuals in Lithuania reached 87%, just below the EU average of 89%. The country has made progress in enhancing digital skills but still encounters hurdles in achieving the Digital Decade targets set for 2030. As of 2022, 49% of the population had attained at least basic digital skills, slightly under the EU average of 54%, and the proportion of individuals with above-basic digital skills was 23%, marginally lower than the EU benchmark of 26%.

=== Fixed broadband ===
In Lithuania, the uptake of broadband services with speeds of at least 100 Mbps was 52% in 2022, marginally below the European Union (EU) average of 55%. Coverage of Fixed Very High Capacity Network (VHCN) and Fiber to the Premises (FTTP) was at 78%, surpassing the EU averages of 73% and 56%, respectively. The "Development of Next Generation Access Infrastructure" project, funded by the European Regional Development Fund (ERDF) for the period 2018–2023, facilitated the installation of 1,235 kilometers of fiber-optic lines and initiated the construction of telecommunication towers. Additionally, as part of the revised National Broadband Plan, the "Development of gigabit broadband infrastructure for digitally sensitive users" project, supported by EUR 49 million from the Recovery and Resilience Facility (RRF), is designed to extend connectivity to 5,000 users across private companies, non-governmental and governmental organizations, municipalities, and municipal companies.

=== Mobile broadband ===
Lithuania's adoption of mobile broadband demonstrated growth, increasing from 74% in 2018 to 85% in 2021, marginally below the EU average of 87%. The expansion of 5G coverage in the country was notably rapid, commencing from 0% in 2020 to 33% in 2021, and subsequently increasing to 90% in 2022, thereby surpassing the EU average of 81%. Moreover, Lithuania's advancement in the allocation of 5G spectrum experienced a marked rise, advancing from 5% in 2021 to 47% in 2023, catching up to the EU average of 68%.

=== Ultra-fast broadband goals ===
The European Commission's "Broadband in Lithuania" report from September 2022 outlines Lithuania's plan, initiated in October 2021, to implement ultra-fast broadband. This plan aims to provide internet speeds of at least 100 Mbit/s (megabits per second) to households and public institutions in both urban and rural areas by 2027. Such speeds are suitable for various online activities. Aligned with the Lithuanian Information Society Development Programme and the Digital Agenda of the Republic of Lithuania, the initiative is designed for nationwide broadband infrastructure expansion.

In terms of infrastructure, Lithuania has committed €75 million to construct communication towers and install fiber optic lines, striving for 95% of households to have access to these high-speed Internet services by 2025. Additionally, the Ministry of Transport and Communications is guiding the country's 5G advancements. Guidelines established in 2020 focus on rolling out next-generation mobile networks, including uninterrupted 5G services along major transport routes by 2025.

=== Digital public services ===
In 2022, Lithuania's usage of e-government services by internet users reached 83%, exceeding the EU average of 74%. The nation's digital public services for citizens and businesses scored 84 and 94 out of 100, respectively, surpassing the EU averages of 77 and 84. Mobile friendliness in Lithuania was rated at 97 out of 100. Additionally, Lithuania's access to e-health records scored 92 out of 100, exceeding the EU average of 72. The country is implementing a digital public and administrative services reform with a budget of EUR 115 million, aiming for completion by 2026. This includes modernizing the State Information Resources Interoperability Platform (Electronic Government Gateway).

== Radio and television ==
=== Radio ===
- Three radio networks operated by the public broadcaster (2007).
- Many privately owned commercial broadcasters, many with repeater stations in various regions throughout the country (2007).
- Radios: 1.9 million (1997).

=== Television ===
- Three channels operated by the public broadcaster, with the third, a satellite channel, introduced in 2014.
- Various privately owned commercial TV broadcasters operate national and multiple regional channels (2007).
- Many privately owned local TV stations (2007).
- Multi-channel cable and satellite TV services are available (2007).
- Televisions: 1.7 million (1997).

== Telephony ==
- Main lines: 667,300 lines in use (2012), 89th in the world; 819,147 lines (2004).
- Mobile cellular: 5 million lines, 110th in the world (2012).
- Telephone system: adequate, but is being modernised to provide an improved international capability and better residential access (2010).
  - Domestic: national fibre-optic cable interurban trunk system; rapid expansion of mobile-cellular services has resulted in a steady decline in the number of fixed-line connections; mobile-cellular teledensity stands at about 140 per 100 persons (2010).
  - International: major international connections to Denmark, Sweden, and Norway by submarine cable for further transmission by satellite; landline connections to Latvia and Poland (2010).
- Country calling code: 370.

== Internet censorship ==
There are no government restrictions on access to the Internet or credible reports that the government monitors e-mail or Internet chat rooms without appropriate legal authority. Individuals and groups generally engage in the free expression of views via the Internet, including by e-mail, but authorities prosecute people for openly posting material on the Internet that authorities considered to be inciting hatred.

The constitution provides for freedom of speech and press, and the government generally respects these rights in practice. An independent press, an effective judiciary, and a functioning democratic political system combine to promote these freedoms. However, the constitutional definition of freedom of expression does not protect certain acts, such as incitement to national, racial, religious, or social hatred, violence and discrimination, or slander, and disinformation. It is a crime to deny or "grossly trivialise" Soviet or Nazi German crimes against Lithuania or its citizens, or to deny genocide, crimes against humanity, or war crimes. In the first 11 months of 2012 authorities initiated investigations into 259 allegations of incitement of hatred and six of incitement of discrimination, most of them over the Internet. Authorities forwarded 69 of those allegations to the courts for trial, closed 68, and suspended 113 for lack of evidence; the others remained under investigation. Most allegations of incitement of hatred involved racist or antisemitic expression, or hostility based on sexual orientation, gender identity, or nationality.

It is a crime to disseminate information that is both untrue and damaging to an individual's honour and dignity. Libel is punishable by a fine or imprisonment of up to one year, or up to two years for libellous material disseminated through the mass media. While it is illegal to publish material "detrimental to minors’ bodies" or thought processes, information promoting the sexual abuse and harassment of minors, promoting sexual relations among minors, or "sexual relations", the law is not often invoked and there are no indications that it adversely affects freedom of the media.

The constitution prohibits arbitrary interference in an individual's personal correspondence or private and family life, but there were reports that the government did not respect these prohibitions in practice. The law requires authorities to obtain judicial authorisation before searching an individual's premises and prohibits the indiscriminate monitoring by government or other parties of citizens' correspondence or communications. However, domestic human rights groups allege that the government does not properly enforce the law.

== See also ==
- Media of Lithuania
- LITNET, an academic and research network in Lithuania
- Ministry of Transport and Communications (Lithuania)
