= Television in Lithuania =

Television in Lithuania was introduced in 1957.

== History ==
At April 30, 1957, TV Vilnius (Note: Now known as LRT.) was launched. At February 26, 1975, the colour broadcasts started using SECAM. In 1989, the rise of regional television started. In 1990, the rise of cable television started but the first operator was launched in 1992 called Vinita (Note: Now known as ,,Cgates".) At January 13, 1991, the broadcasts were suspended for 222 days until August 1991. In 1993, the rise of commercial television started. At October 29, 2012, analogue television was turned off.

== Main channels ==
| Name | Owner | Type | Launched |
|---|---|---|---|
| LRT televizija | Lithuanian National Radio and Television | Public-owned | 1957 |
| LRT televizija (HD) | Lithuanian National Radio and Television | Public-owned | 2014 |
| LRT Plius | Lithuanian National Radio and Television | Public-owned | 2003 |
| LRT Plius (HD) | Lithuanian National Radio and Television | Public-owned | 2017 |
| LRT Lituanica | Lithuanian National Radio and Television | Public-owned | 2007 |
| LNK | Laisvas ir nepriklausomas kanalas, UAB | Private | 1995 |
| LNK (HD) | Laisvas ir nepriklausomas kanalas, UAB | Private | 2018 |
| BTV | Laisvas ir nepriklausomas kanalas, UAB | Private | 1993 |
| BTV (HD) | Laisvas ir nepriklausomas kanalas, UAB | Private | 2018 |
| TV1 | Laisvas ir nepriklausomas kanalas, UAB | Private | 2003 |
| TV1 (HD) | Laisvas ir nepriklausomas kanalas, UAB | Private | 2018 |
| 2TV | Laisvas ir nepriklausomas kanalas, UAB | Private | 2007 |
| Info TV | Laisvas ir nepriklausomas kanalas, UAB | Private | 2007 |
| TV3 | TV3 Group | Private | 1993 |
| TV3 (HD) | TV3 Group | Private | 2018 |
| TV6 | TV3 Group | Private | 2002 |
| TV6 (HD) | TV3 Group | Private | 2018 |
| TV8 | TV3 Group | Private | 2011 |
| TV8 (HD) | TV3 Group | Private | 2018 |
| Go3 films | TV3 Group | Private | 2008 |
| Go3 films (HD) | TV3 Group | Private | 2018 |
| Go3 Sport 1 | TV3 Group | Private | 2009 |
| Go3 Sport 1 (HD) | TV3 Group | Private | 2018 |
| Go3 Sport 2 | TV3 Group | Private | 2019 |
| Go3 Sport 3 | TV3 Group | Premium pay or view | 2019 |
| Go3 Sport 4 | TV3 Group | Premium pay or view | 2019 |
| Go3 Sport Open | TV3 Group | Private | 2021 |
| Lietuvos rytas TV | Lietuvos rytas | Private | 2008 |
| Lietuvos rytas TV (HD) | Lietuvos rytas | Private | 2017 |
| TV11 (Note: Went defunct in 2011.) | TV3 Group | Private | 1996 |
| TV3 Plus | TV3 Group | Private | 2022 |
| Delfi TV, (Note: Served for Telia customers.) | Ekspress Grupp | For Telia cable customers | 2019 |
| Balticum TV | Balticum | Private | 1989 |
| Balticum Auksinis | Balticum | Films | 2003 |
| Balticum Platinum | Balticum | Films | 2015 |
| Balticum Platinum (HD) | Balticum | Films | 2015 |
| Sport1 (Lithuania) | Sport Entertainment, UAB | Private | 2008 |
| Žvaigždė (TV channel) | Žvaigždė TV | Private | 2005 |
| Baby TV | ? | Private | 2005 |
| Pingvinukas | Teledistribution | Private | 2010 |
| KidZone Max | Duo Media Networks (Postimees Group) | Private | 2013 |
| KidZone Max (HD) | Duo Media Networks (Postimees Group) | Private | 2013 |
| FX (Russian TV channel) | FX Baltics | Private | 2008 |
| FX Life (Russian TV channel) | FX Baltics | Private | 2008 |
| FX Life (HD) | FX Baltics | Private | 2008 |
| TVP Wilno | TVP | Public | 2014 |
| Current Time TV | RFE/RL | Non-commercial | 2014 |
| TVP Polonia | In Polish | Private | 1992 |
| Duo 3 | Duo Media Networks (Postimees Group) | Private | 2021 |
| Duo 3 (HD) | Duo Media Networks (Postimees Group) | Private | 2021 |
| Duo 5 | Duo Media Networks (Postimees Group) | Private | 2024 |
| Duo 6 | Duo Media Networks (Postimees Group) | Private | 2021 |
| Duo 6 (HD) | Duo Media Networks (Postimees Group) | Private | 2021 |
| Duo Star | Duo Media Networks (Postimees Group) | Private | 2026 |
| Nickelodeon CEE | Skydance | Private | 2017 |
| Nick Jr CEE | Skydance | Private | 2017 |
| Nicktoons CEE | Skydance | Private | 2017 |
| AMC Baltics | AMC Networks EMEA | Private | 2015 |
| History CEE | AMC Networks EMEA | Private | 2015 |
| Extreme Sports Channel | AMC Networks EMEA | Private | 2015 |

== Regional channels ==
| Name | Launched | Type |
|---|---|---|
| Pūkas-TV (Note: Based on the broadcaster Pūkas.) | 2001 | Kaunas County |
| Pūkas-TV (HD) | 2013 | Kaunas County |

== See also ==
- Media of Lithuania
- Lists of television channels
