= Lietuvos rytas (disambiguation) =

Lietuvos rytas (lit. Morning of Lithuania) is a Lithuanian daily newspaper.

Lietuvos rytas may also refer to:

- BC Lietuvos Rytas (primary basketball team of Vilnius carried the newspaper name from 1997 to 2018)
- Lietuvos rytas TV
- Lietuvos rytas Arena, Vilnius
