= Arūnas Valinskas =

Lithuanian politician

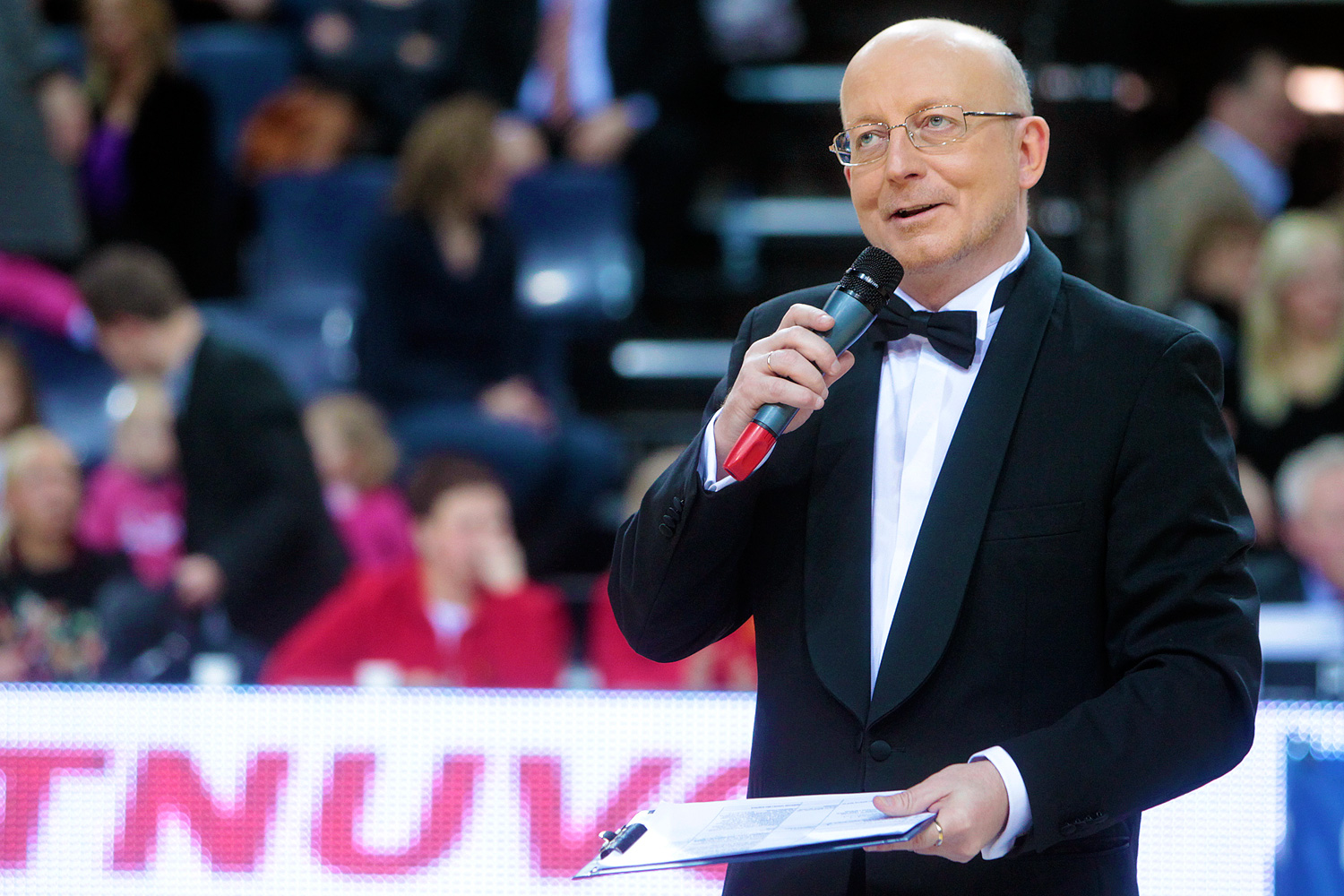
- Valinskas in 2011

Speaker of the Seimas
- In office 17 November 2008 – 15 September 2009
- Preceded by: Česlovas Juršėnas
- Succeeded by: Irena Degutienė

Member of the Seimas
- In office 17 November 2008 – 16 November 2012

Personal details
- Born: 28 November 1966 (age 59) Lazdijai, Lithuania
- Party: Liberal and Centre Union
- Spouse: Inga Valinskienė
- Children: Arūnas Valinskas; Šarūnas Valinskas

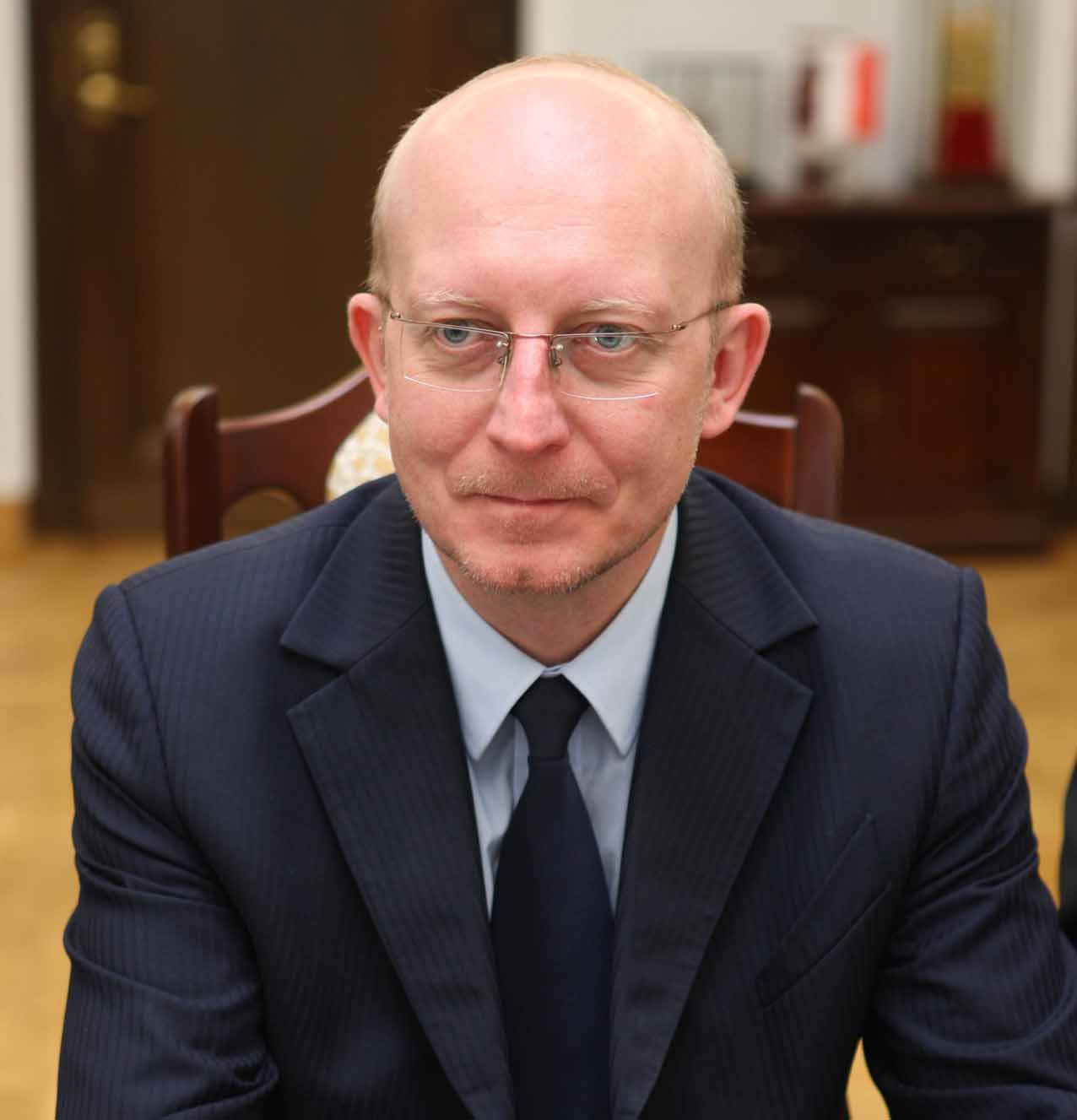

Arūnas Valinskas (born 28 November 1966) is a Lithuanian showman, TV producer, TV show host and politician. As the leader of the National Resurrection Party, he was elected to the Seimas, Lithuanian parliament, in the 2008 Lithuanian parliamentary election. Valinskas is married to a Lithuanian singer and TV show host Inga Valinskienė and has two sons Arūnas and Šarūnas. In 2002 he was granted a master's degree in law at Vilnius University.

== Career as entertainer ==
In the 1990s, Valinskas began his acting and hosting career. He is the creator of several famous TV shows in Lithuania such as Taip ir Ne (Litpolinter TV), Arena (BTV), Dviračio šou (both BTV and LNK), and popular reality-competition shows such as Miss Captivity Pageant (LNK) and Kelias į žvaigždes (LNK) and Žvaigždžių vartai (TV3). He has hosted many concerts and shows including Šeši nuliai – milijonas (LNK). In 2012 he came back to show business with restored TV show Taip ir Ne.

Many Lithuanian stars, including Radži, Berneen, Vilija Matačiūnaitė, Vudis became known after appearing in his shows.

== Political career ==
Valinskas founded the National Resurrection Party in 2008 before the election to the Seimas. He was the Speaker of the Seimas from 17 November 2008 to 15 September 2009. Valinskas declared as a candidate for the 2009 Lithuanian presidential elections, but withdrew before the election. In 2011 National Resurrection Party merged to the Liberal and Centre Union.

== Controversies ==
=== Feuds ===
Disagreements between an LNK journalist at the time Rūta Janutienė and Arūnas Valinskas originated in 2008, when during a live broadcast Janutienė openly questioned Valinskas' wealth and income declaration as well as his debt in a sarcastic demeanor, and she asked whether Valinskas is "running for Seimas [Lithuanian Parliament] because of bankruptcy?" To this he responded by saying: "It is probably you who is going bankrupt if you're hosting such shows that don't fit you. You're short of money, perhaps?" This discussion escalated drastically between the two until the politician pointed out that Janutienė criticized his wife―Inga Valinskienė―for having "a prostitute-like image" in a magazine, and raised a rhetorical question: "Where is it worse being a prostitute―in a photo or in journalism?" Valinskas also accused her of working for the President of Lithuania Rolandas Paksas who faced impeachment and thus had to step down back in 2004.

In 2020, a Polish-Lithuanian politician and an activist for Polish minorities Valdemar Tomaševski sued Valinskas after the latter suggested executing him and others alike by shooting, saying: "Tomaševski is an absolute Colorado beetle [a pest] who is antistate despite getting financial support from the Lithuanian State Budget. Such as he should be executed by shooting, for no particular reason. One a year. Starting with him." However, the Lithuanian Prosecutor's Office stated that the thoughts expressed by Valinskas are not a crime. Valinskas later responded to the outburst by saying: "This [the statement about execution by shooting] was just a scenic humorous statement by using subjunctive mood without any encouragement to take actual measures. It was a vivid expression of my opinion about this 'political figure'."
