= Mass media in Lithuania =

Before the independence from the Soviet Union (USSR) in 1990, Lithuanian print media sector served mainly as a propaganda instrument of the Communist Party of Lithuania (LKP). Alternative and uncontrolled press began to appear in the country starting from 1988, when the Initiative Group of the Reform Movement of Lithuania Sąjūdis was established. After the declaration of independence the government stopped interfering in the media outlets which for the most part were first privatised to their journalists and employees and later to local businessman and companies. Currently media ownership in Lithuania is concentrated among a small number of domestic and foreign companies.

In 2017 Freedom House defined Lithuania's press freedom status as “free", while the 2022 World Press Freedom Index prepared annually by Reporters Without Borders (RSF) states that journalists in Lithuania work in a "relatively favourable" environment. RSF's Index ranks Lithuania 9th among 180 countries. A national survey conducted in October 2017 found that only 37.3% of respondents trust mass media.

== Historical background ==
Although Lithuania declared independence in 1990 - which was recognized by the USSR one year later - alternative and uncontrolled press began to appear in the country starting from 1988, when the Initiative Group of the Reform Movement of Lithuania Sąjūdis was established. During the period of transition to democracy (1988-1990) Sąjūdis published several newspapers, both national and local, establishing the basis of a diversified media landscape. After the declaration of independence the government stopped interfering in the media outlets which for the most part were privatised to their journalists and employees.

The number of newspaper titles in Lithuania rose sharply in 1990–1992 and assured its enormous diversity. In 1995 there were 477 newspaper titles. There was also a proliferation in the radio and television market. However, the economic recession in 1996 was followed by a decrease in the circulation of newspapers and journals. The Russian financial crisis in 1998 also affected negatively Lithuanian economy, hitting the capacity of the readers to buy newspapers that became prohibitively expensive for majority of population.

The hundreds of joint stock companies that emerged in the first years of Lithuanian independence were first sold to local businessman and companies. These were then bought by large publishing companies or foreign investors by the end of the 1990s. Today a small number of domestic and foreign companies owns the media in Lithuania.

== Media outlets ==
=== Print and internet media ===
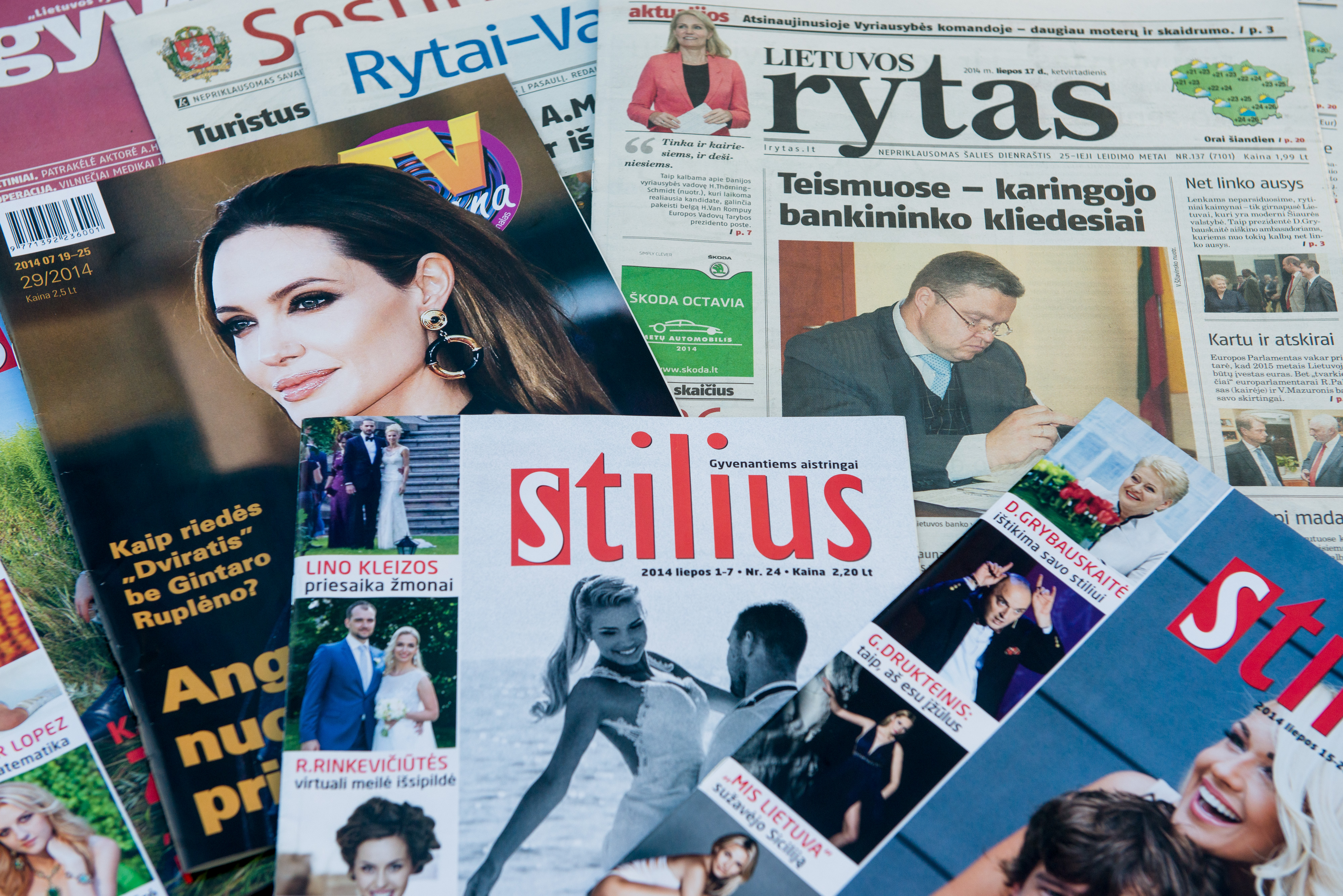

Lithuania is experiencing a sharp decline of newspapers as well as newspapers' readership in recent years. Between 2018 and 2021, the audience of most popular issues has nearly halved, while the number of Lithuanian print newspapers has been continuously decreasing since the Great Recession. Besides many that have closed, for example Lietuvos žinios, others have become weeklies. The main remaining dailies are Lietuvos rytas, Vakaro žinios and Kauno diena and their audience is mostly represented by older people. The decline in the number of print media is considered in line with a worldwide trend enhanced by the influence of the Internet and the social media. But it is also attributed to local factors such as the absence of well rooted instruments of trust building in the country's print media culture, as well as insufficient implementation of transparency standards and journalist ethics. The prevalence of political scandals and celebrities over analytical comments in the newspapers has also been under criticism for some time.

The Internet media is widely diffused also due to the high number of Internet users, accounted for 2.2 in 2016 - around 77% of the population. The rise of the Internet media was led by foreign-owned companies. Estonian media companies currently control the most influential Internet news portals in Lithuania. In 2014, the two most popular news portals, delfi.lt and 15min.lt, were owned by Estonian media companies Ekspress Group and Meedia. Internet news media mainly depend on advertising revenue, while a number of them introduced fee-based news services. The business daily Verslo žinios/Business News was the first one to introduce fee-based news in 2002. The biggest national daily Lietuvos rytas introduced its subscription service in 2004.

=== Radio ===
There are overall 115 Radio broadcasting stations airing in the five major Lithuanian cities (Vilnius; Kaunas; Klaipėda; Šiauliai; Panevėžys). Ten broadcasters air 13 national radio stations, 8 regional radio broadcasters air 39 radio stations and 29 broadcasters air 63 local radio stations. The majority of these radio broadcasters are commercial and are mostly small music and entertainment broadcasters. The competition for the advertising revenue that characterizes all the Lithuanian media landscape also applies to the radio sector, making it economically unstable.

=== Television ===
After 1990 Lithuanian television went through big changes like the rest of the mass media. Foreign capital introduced by Scandinavian countries and others contributed to this transformation. The Lithuanian National Radio and Television (LRT), financed by state budget, became public in 1990 and joined the European Broadcasting Union (EBU) three years later. It operates three national televisions, three radio channels and an internet portal. The Act amending the Law on the Lithuanian National Radio and Television that came into force in 2015 banned commercial advertising on all LRT radio and TV channels. The number of television channels has multiplied in recent years. Three out of four national TV stations have established their second channels, with the aim of covering the needs of different segments of society through different outlets. In 2016, there were 10 local television channels transmitted over the digital terrestrial TV stations, while the most popular television channels among TV viewers by time watched were TV3, LNK and LRT TELEVIZIJA.

=== News agencies ===
There are two national news agencies in Lithuania: ELTA (Lietuvos naujienų agentūra) and BNS (Baltic News Service). Both of them are private companies based in Vilnius. BNS disseminates news in Russian and English (as well as the domestic languages of Estonian, Latvian, and Lithuanian) via the internet and by other means. Subscribers include media, financial, industrial, and government institutions in the Baltic states. BNS was owned by the Finnish media group Alma Media from 2001 until March 2014 when it was sold to Uudisvoog OÜ, a company fully owned by the Estonian Ilmar Kompus who is also the owner of the Sky Plus radio station. ELTA became an independent (non state-owned) national news agency in 1996 and is currently a joint-stock company. The major shareholder of ELTA is Respublikos Investicija, owned by Vitas and Justinas Tomkus.

== Legal framework ==
In Lithuania legislation concerning the media is primarily represented by the Law on the Provision of Information to the Public, the Law on Telecommunications, and, the Law on Electronic Communications. The Law on the Provision of Information to the Public was amended in 2015 by Lithuanian authorities and introduced a penalty of up to 3% percent of a broadcaster's annual income for spreading information that is considered war propaganda, encouragement to change the country's constitutional order, or an encroachment on the country's sovereignty to contrast hostile propaganda and disinformation. Several Russian television stations were taken to court by Lithuanian Radio and Television Commission (LRTK) on the basis of this law. During 2014 and 2015, Rossija RTR (previously [RTR-Planeta]); [NTV] Mir; TVCi, [PBK Lithuania] and [REN TV] were found to have violated Lithuanian broadcasting regulations and temporarily suspended or fined. Trying to provoke tension and violence between Ukrainian and Russians, as well as against the European Union and NATO member states, were among the violations established by the authorities. In Lithuania, Russian programs make up 22 percent of total television broadcasting, as opposed to Lithuanian programs that make up 23 percent of it.

== Censorship and media freedom ==
In 2017 Freedom House defined Lithuania's press freedom status as “free", while the 2022 World Press Freedom Index prepared annually by Reporters Without Borders (RSF) states that journalists in Lithuania work in a "relatively favourable" environment despite flaws in the legal system, financial issues and tensions with the government. According to RSF's Index the country is ranked 9th among 180 countries.

Although the generally positive evaluation of Lithuania's media freedom presented by international media watchdogs, in recent years there occurred a few episodes concerning censorship on media freedom.

For instance public information about LGBT people has been restricted in several occasions. The law was officially condemned by the European Parliament.

In November 2013 Lithuanian intelligence, the Special Investigation Service (SIS) raided the Baltic News Service (BNS) office in Vilnius. The SIS tried to compel the journalists of the news agency to reveal their sources after they reported that Lithuanian intelligence agents had information about Russian officials’ plans to launch smear campaign about Lithuanian President, Dalia Grybauskaite. Six journalists were questioned, computers were confiscated whilst the BNS editors' houses were also searched.

Lithuanian intelligence recorded telephone conversations of the BNS employees within the pretrial investigation of the matter. The wiretapping was declared unlawful by Vilnius Regional Administrative Court, while president Grybauskaitė signed amendments to the Law on Provision of Information to the Public and to the Code of Criminal Procedure. The amendments established that prosecutorial procedures with the potential of impinging upon press freedom or individual rights can be only carried out in cases of great public interest.

Another aborted censorship episode occurred at the end of 2016, when MPs of the Lithuanian Parliament unanimously voted to amend the country's Civil Code to limit the right to criticize public figures. The regulation has been opposed for its potential risk to deter the media from informing the public on pertinent issues. The law could not come into force because it was vetoed by Lithuanian president and the amendments were subsequently withdrawn by the Parliament.

The conditions are unequal. After this, the debate will end. Šimonytė and Nausėda [other two political candidates] will get eight points, we will get zero. And this has been going on for a year now. Ratings, you say! It’s all about frequency of promotion! With such unequal promotion even a monkey could be voted for!

— Arvydas Juozaitis expressing his discontent towards LRT during live Presidential election debate.

There have been some instances in Lithuania when journalists lost their job positions in the mainstream media due to providing alternative views to the audience or raising uncomfortable questions for political figures. For example, journalists such as Rūta Janutienė, Viktoras Gerulaitis, or Vytautas Matulevičius eventually became outcasts in the mainstream media. As a result, they began establishing their own alternative media channels such as PressJazz TV or OpTV on YouTube to raise such problems as local political corruption, national authorities not protecting the interests of the state, shifts in geopolitics and environmental protection. They also invite various politicians and lawyers to back up their claims.

There have been some concerns raised about mainstream media being biased towards political candidates during elections as some politicians were accused of being given far more representation in the media than others. In 2019, a presidential candidate professor Arvydas Juozaitis has expressed his discontent on air during the Presidential election debate on LRT and left the studio. However, others responded to this believing it to be a provocation.

As of 2021, a survey regarding general public's trust of the media has been done, which indicated that 24.8% of the respondents trust the media while 33.4% don't—the lowest recorded percentage since 1998. According to Vladas Gaidys, this can mainly be attributed to mainstream media supporting the side of the government on such topics as the migrant border crisis caused by Belarus and vaccination policies for dealing with the COVID-19 pandemic. According to the Lithuanian sociologist Professor Rūta Žiliukaitė, "[w]hen people feel like their voice is not being heard or their representation is overwhelmingly negative, we lose an opportunity of dialogue with those people. You can't call person a moron and expect that he will happily be willing to have a conversation with you."

== Media ownership ==
Media ownership concentration has been increasing over the last several years due to the purchase of media outlets by domestic and foreign companies. Nonetheless, national ownership prevails in the Lithuanian media because a number of foreign multinationals, in line with similar trends in the CEE region, decided to exit relatively small and volatile markets. For instance Norvegian Orkla Media (Norway’s second largest media house) fully owned the newspaper Kauno diena until it sold it to Lithuanian Hermis Capital in 2007. Swedish Bonnier, which owns the business newspaper Verslo žinios, was the main investor in the Lithuanian television market until Lithuanian MG Baltic Media purchased LNK in 2003.

The country does not have a legislation for media market regulation or anti-monopoly law. Consequently, media monopoly and cross ownership are frequent as large sectors of the media belong to one single owner. This also leads to the dissemination of the same material in different outlets. Media companies have also been criticised for insufficient reporting to the Lithuanian Minister of Culture about their owners, although it is required by the law. Editors-in-chiefs are shareholders or owners of a number of news outlets while a considerable number of politicians and public servants own media tools. According to the Lithuanian office of Transparency International in 2016 there were 26 such owners. This is because politicians and public servants, who typically own regional media, continue to remain as media holders after their election to the Parliament or municipal councils.

== See also ==
- Telecommunications in Lithuania
- Television in Lithuania
