= Osvaldas Balakauskas =

Lithuanian composer and diplomat (1937–2026)

- Balakauskas, c. 2000
- Born: 19 December 1937; Miliūnai, Ukmergė District, Lithuania
- Died: 15 April 2026 (aged 88); Vilnius, Lithuania
- Education: Tchaikovsky Kiev State Conservatory
- Occupations: Composer; Academic teacher
- Organizations: Lithuanian Academy of Music and Theatre
- Awards: Lithuanian National Prize for Culture and Arts

Osvaldas Jonas Balakauskas (19 December 1937 – 15 April 2026) was a Lithuanian composer of classical music, academic teacher and diplomat. He taught at the Lithuanian Academy of Music and Theatre, where he served as head of the composition department from 1988 to 1992 and again from 1995. From 1992 to 1994, he served as Lithuania's ambassador to France, Spain and Portugal. Balakauskas composed five symphonies, concertos, chamber music, and a Requiem in memory of Stasys Lozoraitis.

== Life and career ==
Balakauskas was born in Miliūnai on 19 December 1937. He graduated from Vilnius Pedagogical University in 1961. After his mandatory service in the Soviet Army between 1961 and 1964, he studied composition with Boris Lyatoshinsky and Myroslav Skoryk at the Tchaikovsky Kiev State Conservatory until 1969. He worked from 1968 to 1972 for the Muzyčna Ukraïna publishing house in Kyiv, and as an advisor for the Lithuanian composers' association until 1985.

He lectured at the Lithuanian Academy of Music and Theatre from 1985, serving from 1988 to 1992 and again from 1995 as head of the composition department. From 1992 to 1994 he was the ambassador of Lithuania to France, Spain, and Portugal, resident in Paris.

In 1996 he received the Lithuanian National Prize, the country's highest artistic and cultural distinction, and he was awarded the Order of Gediminas (Grand Cross) in 1999.

Balakauskas died in Vilnius on 15 April 2026, at the age of 88, and was buried in the city's Antakalnis Cemetery.

== Music ==
Balakauskas composed symphonies, concertos, chamber, and instrumental music. Based on twelve-tone technique, he invented his own scales for mathematically based composing. A reviewer described his music as built on small melodic elements and sometimes longer phrases, with rhythmic elements developing simultaneously, in lush but transparent orchestration.

Important works include Sonata of the Mountains inspired by the paintings of Mikalojus Konstantinas Čiurlionis (1975), Symphony No. 2 (1979), Opera Strumentale (1987) and Symphonies No. 4 (1998) and No. 5 (2001).

His works were recorded by Naxos Records, the Requiem in memoriam Stasys Lozoraitis in 2003, by mezzo-soprano Judita Leitaitė, the Vilnius Municipal Choir and the Christopher Chamber Orchestra of Vilnius conducted by Donatas Katkus; the Fourth and Fifth Symphonies were recorded in 2003 and 2004 by the Lithuanian National Symphony Orchestra conducted by Juozas Domarkas.

== Works ==
Compositions by Balakauskas include:

Stage

- Komunarų gatvė (Street of Communards), chamber opera (1977)
- Zodiakas (Zodiac), film-ballet (1984)
- Makbetas (Macbeth), ballet (1988)
- La Lointaine, chamber opera (2002)

Orchestral

- Symphony No. 1 (1973)
- Symphony No. 2 (1979)
- Symphony No. 3 "Ostrobothnian Symphony", for string orchestra (1989)
- Symphony No. 4 (1998)
- Symphony No. 5 (2001)
- Opera Strumentale (1987)

Concertante

- Concertino for piano and string orchestra (1966)
- Ludus Modorum for cello and chamber orchestra (1972)
- Kalnų sonata (Sonata of the Mountains) for piano and orchestra (1975)
- Passio Strumentale for string quartet and orchestra (1980)
- Concerto for oboe, harpsichord and string orchestra (1981)
- Sinfonia Concertante for violin, piano and orchestra (1982)
- Concerto RK for violin and chamber orchestra (1997)
- Concerto Brio for violin and orchestra (1999)
- Capriccio for piano and orchestra (2004)
- Concerto for clarinet and string orchestra (2008)
- Seasons for two pianos and string orchestra (2009)

Chamber music

- Sonatas for violin and piano (1969; No. 2, 2005; February Sonata, 2012)
- Kaip marių bangos prisilietimas (Like the touch of a sea wave) for violin and piano (1975)
- Medis ir paukštė (The Tree and the Bird) for viola and piano (1976)
- Do nata for cello or viola and tape (1982)
- Lietus Krokuvai (Rain for Cracow) for violin and piano (1991)
- Maggiore-Minore for violin and piano (1994)
- La Valse for solo violin (1997), after the concerto for oboe, harpsichord and string orchestra
- Corrente for flute, viola and piano (2005)
- Duo concertante for viola and piano (2007)
- Trio concertante for flute, viola and piano (2008)

Choral

- Requiem in memoriam Stasys Lozoraitis (1995)
