= List of radio stations in Lithuania =

This is a list of radio stations in Lithuania.

== Radio Groups ==
- LRT
  - LRT Radijas (news)
  - LRT Klasika (classical)
  - LRT Opus (electronic)
- Radiocentras Group
  - Radiocentras (pop)
  - Relax FM (Lithuanian pop)
  - RADIO•R (in Russian language)
  - ZIP FM (dance)
  - Rock FM (rock)
  - Radio Fiesta (latino) (Vilnius 90.7 FM and Kaunas 93.6 FM)
- 15min Group
  - M1 (pop)
  - Lietus (Lithuanian pop)
  - M1 Plius (pop, rock, jazz)
  - Laluna (Klaipeda 94.9 FM, Šilutė 88.9 FM)
  - M1 Dance (dance) (Klaipeda 100.8 FM)
- Pūkas
  - Pūkas (traditional and wedding Lithuanian music)
  - Pūkas 2 (jazz)
- Žinių radijas
  - Žinių radijas
  - EASY FM (jazz)
- TV3 Group
  - Radio 3 (various)
  - Power Hit Radio (dance)
- Radiola
  - European Hit Radio (pop)
  - Super FM (pop) (Vilnius 100.5 FM)
- MediaLT
  - Gold FM (formerly Laisvoji Banga) (pop)
  - Geras FM (various) (Vilnius 101.9 FM and Kaunas 91.9 FM)

== Religious, regional and local radio stations ==
- Marijos radijas (religious)
- XFM (formerly Aukštaitijos radijas) (religious)
- Radijas Kelyje (various/local network) (Vilnius 107.7 FM, Kaunas 105.9 FM, Klaipeda 99.8 FM)
- Jazz FM (jazz) (Vilnius 99.3 FM, planned Klaipeda 99.0 FM)
- BBC World Service (in English language) (Vilnius 95.5 FM)
- Radio Znad Wilii, included programs from Polskie Radio (Polish and Belarusian services) (in Polish and Belarusian languages) (Vilnius 103.8 FM)
- Start FM (students) (Vilnius 94.2 FM)
- Vaikų Radijas (kids) (Vilnius 94.9 FM)
- Baltupių radijas (gymnasium) (Vilnius 97.9 FM)
- Vilnius FM (music) (Vilnius 104.3 FM)
- Mano FM (Kaunas 94.4 FM)
- Tau Radijas (Kaunas 102.9 FM)
- Sol FM (Klaipeda 93.3 FM)
- XXL FM (Klaipeda 95.3 FM, Tauragė 99.7 FM, Plungė 99.5 FM, Telšiai 96.8 FM, Šiauliai 88.8 FM)
- RS2 (Šiauliai 97.8 FM)
- Radijo Klubas (gymnasium) (Šiauliai 99.4 FM)
- Saulės Radijas (Šiauliai 102.5 FM)
- Pulsas (Panevėžys 96.6 FM and Biržai 107.3 FM)
- Utenos Radijas (Utena 103.9 FM)
- FM 99 (formerly Alytaus Radijas) (Alytus 99.0 FM and Druskininkai 97.2 FM)
- Tauragės Radijas (Tauragė 98.2 FM)
- Mažeikiai FM (Mažeikiai 105.6 FM)
- Mažeikių aidas (Mažeikiai 100.4 FM)
- Kapsai (Marijampolė 100.2 FM)

== Internet radio stations ==
- Pasaulio muzikos radijas
- TOP FM
- Radio Vilnius
- ZW FUN (in Polish language)
- PWR Gold
- LRT 100
- Radiocentras Group
  - Relax FM 100 hitu
  - Relax FM Sentimentai
  - Zip FM is kasetes
  - Radio R Energy (in Russian language)

== International AM-radio ==
- 666 AM
  - Radio Signal (15:00-21:00 UTC)
- 1386 AM
  - Radio Svoboda (RFE/RL Russian service) (18:30-21:30 UTC)
  - Radio Ukraine International (21:30-4:00 UTC)
  - Radio Poland (all language services) (4:00-5:30, 14:00-15:00, 15:30-17:00 UTC)
  - NHK World Radio Japan Russian service (15:00-15:30, 17:00-17:50 UTC)
  - Radio Strana Regionov (17:50-18:20 UTC)
- 1557 AM
  - Radio Lenta (15:00-21:00 UTC)
