= Lithuanian Land Forces =

Branch of the Lithuanian military

- Lietuvos sausumos pajėgos
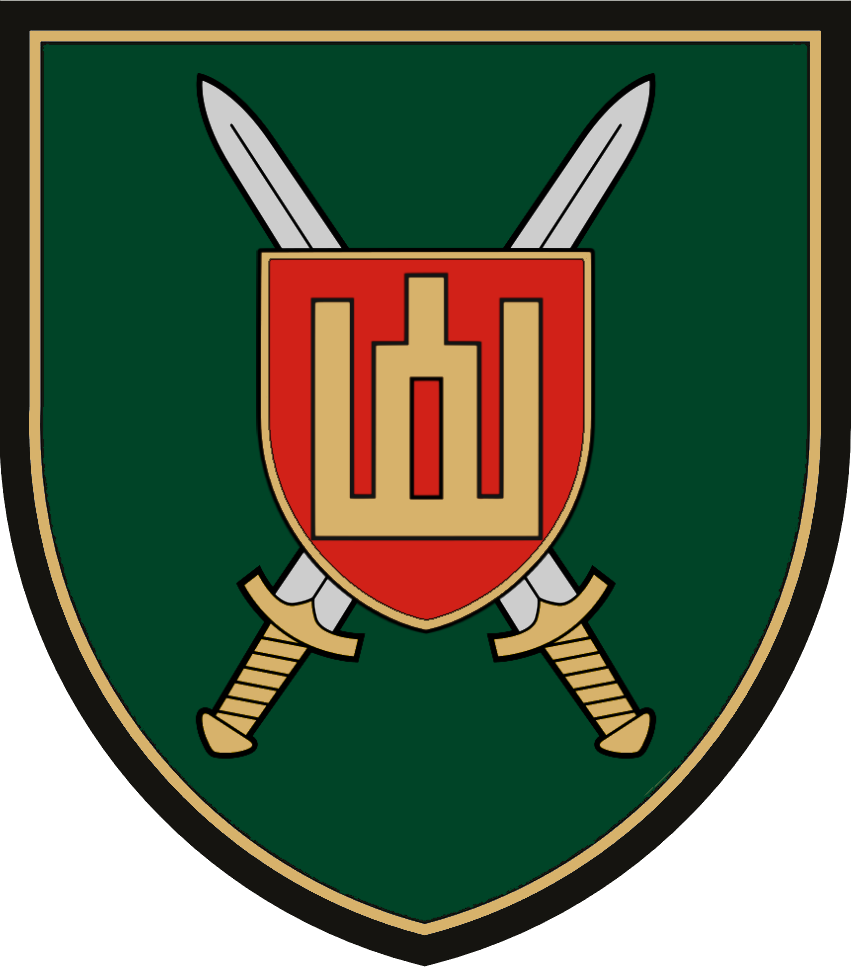
- Insignia of Land Forces Command
- Active: 1918–1940, 1990–present
- Country: Lithuania
- Branch: Army
- Type: Land force
- Role: Defend territory of Lithuania and act as an integral part of NATO forces
- Size: 12,000 active duty 5,500 volunteer force ~3,500 conscripts
- Part of: Lithuanian Armed Forces
- Garrison/HQ: Vilnius
- Mottos: Vienybėje jėga, tikėjime - pergalė! (Translation: "Strength in unity, victory in belief!")
- Equipment: Lithuanian army equipment
- Website: Official site

Commanders
- Commander: Brigadier General Nerijus Stankevičius
- Chief of Staff: Colonel Viktoras Bagdonas

Insignia
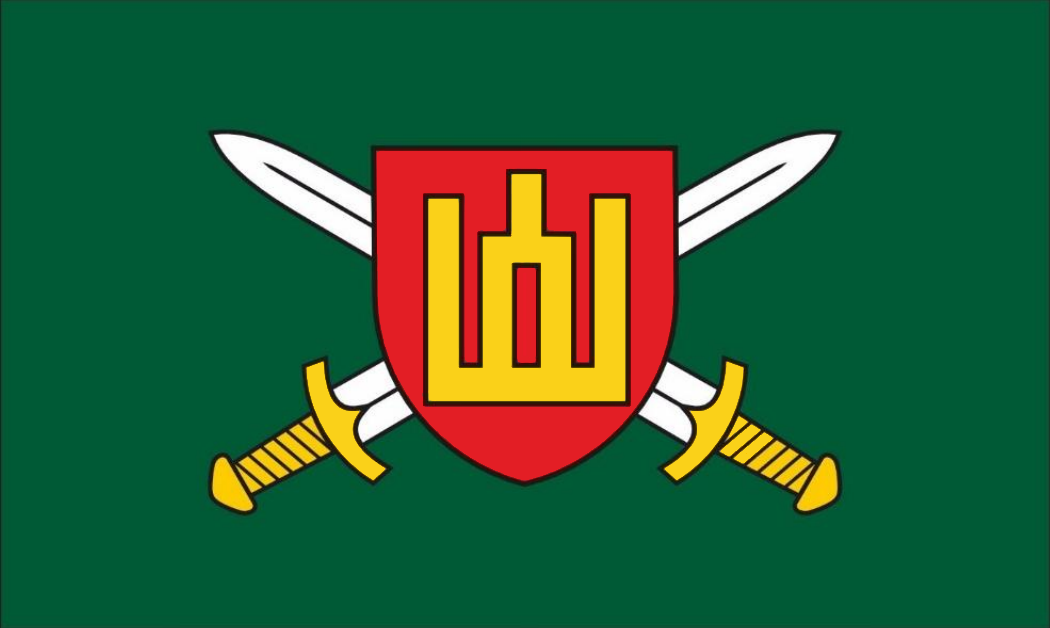
- Flag of Lithuanian Land Force

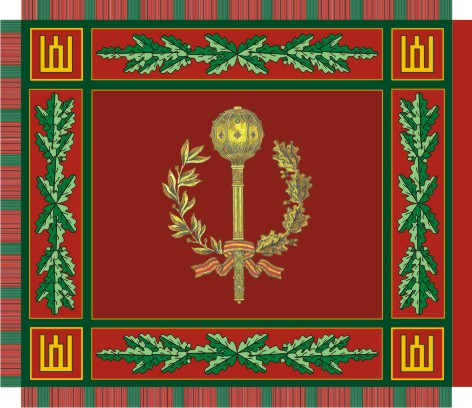
- Flag of Land Forces Command

The Lithuanian Land Forces (LLF) form the backbone of the Lithuanian Armed Forces and are capable of acting as an integral part of NATO forces. Lithuanian Land Forces consist of the newly-formed 1st Division, the Lithuanian National Defence Volunteer Forces, and supporting units, together comprising over 22,000 soldiers.

== Structure ==
The main element of the Land Forces is the 1st Army Division, comprising the Iron Wolf Mechanised Infantry Brigade, The "Žemaitija" (Griffin) infantry brigade, and the "Aukštaitija" infantry brigade.

The Iron Wolf Mechanised Infantry Brigade is the main element of the Division and is formed around three mechanized infantry battalions and an artillery battalion, all named after Lithuanian grand dukes as the tradition of the Lithuanian Armed Forces goes.

The "Žemaitija" (Griffin) brigade was activated on 1 January 2016. It is composed of three motorised infantry battalions and one artillery battalion; one of these is tasked to support operations both domestically and overseas; one is tasked primarily with the defence of territorial Lithuania.

The Brigade "Aukštaitija" is a reserve brigade, which was activated on 23 March 2017. In peacetime the brigade's headquarter staff works at the Lithuanian Armed Forces Training and Doctrine Command. The brigade's three maneuver battalions are made up of reservists, while the three battalion's headquarters personnel works in peacetime at the Division General Stasys Raštikis Lithuanian Armed Forces School, Great Lithuanian Hetman Jonušas Radvila Training Regiment, and General Adolfas Ramanauskas Combat Training Center. The brigade's reconnaissance company is composed of conscripts, while the brigade's headquarters, signal and logistic units are composed of professional soldiers. When activated the brigade consists of around 4,500 troops.

Juozas Vitkus Engineer Battalion is responsible for mine clearance, the construction of pontoon bridges, unexploded ordnance detonation tasks, underwater engineering, and participation in search and rescue operations. The Explosive Ordnance Disposal Platoon is ready to participate in international operations. Starting in 2008, the Lithuanian Armed Forces launched a 10-year-long project continuing mine cleaning on Lithuanian territory of explosives left after the First and Second World War, and in former Soviet military bases.

As an integral part of the Land Forces, the National Defence Volunteers have been developing since the beginning of the national movement for independence. The volunteers act smoothly together with the Allies during military operations and have been assigned new missions: to augment the regular forces, to deploy individual units and specific capabilities for international operations, to assist host nation support and to support the civilian authorities.

== Organization ==
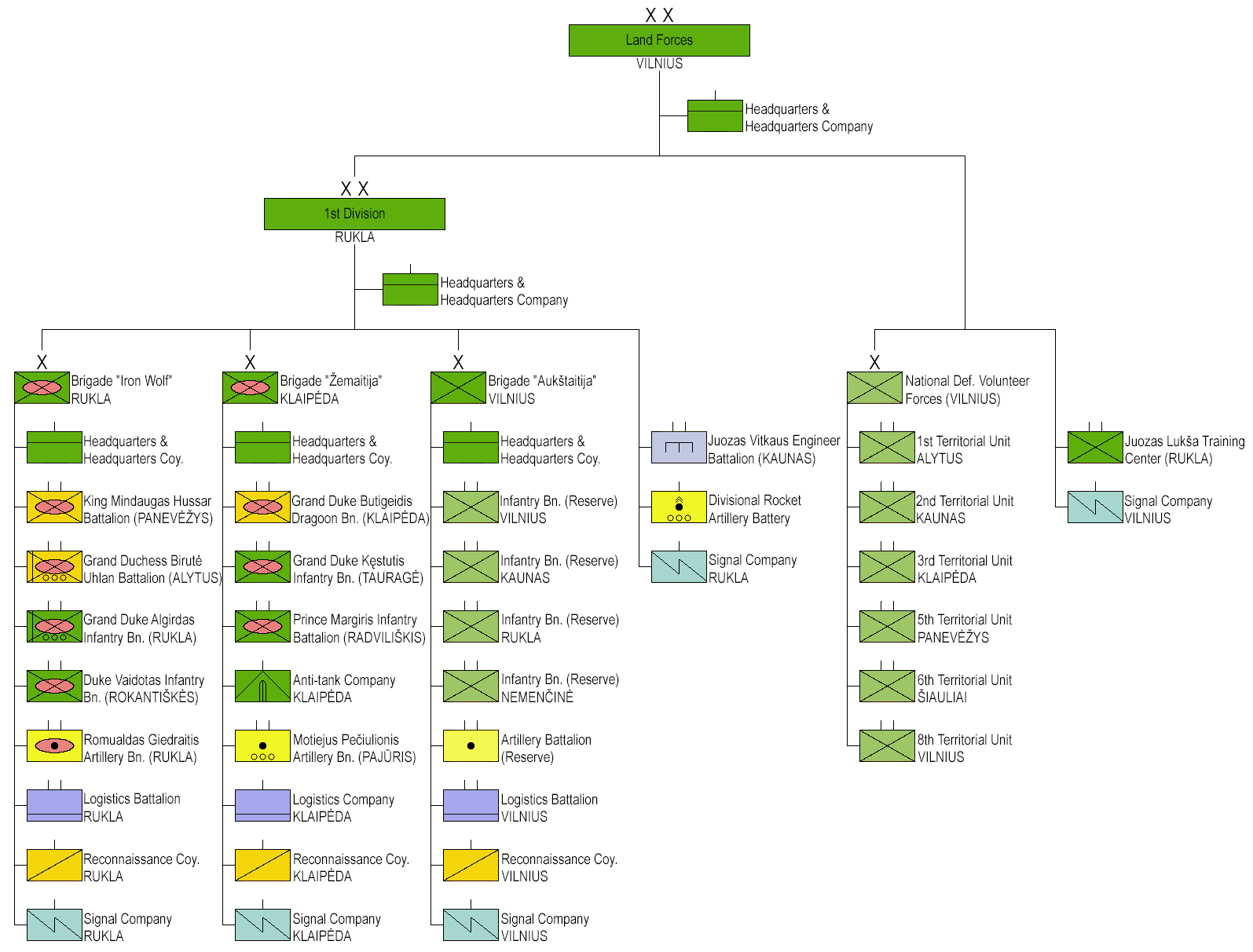
Lithuanian Land Forces organization 2025 (click to enlarge)

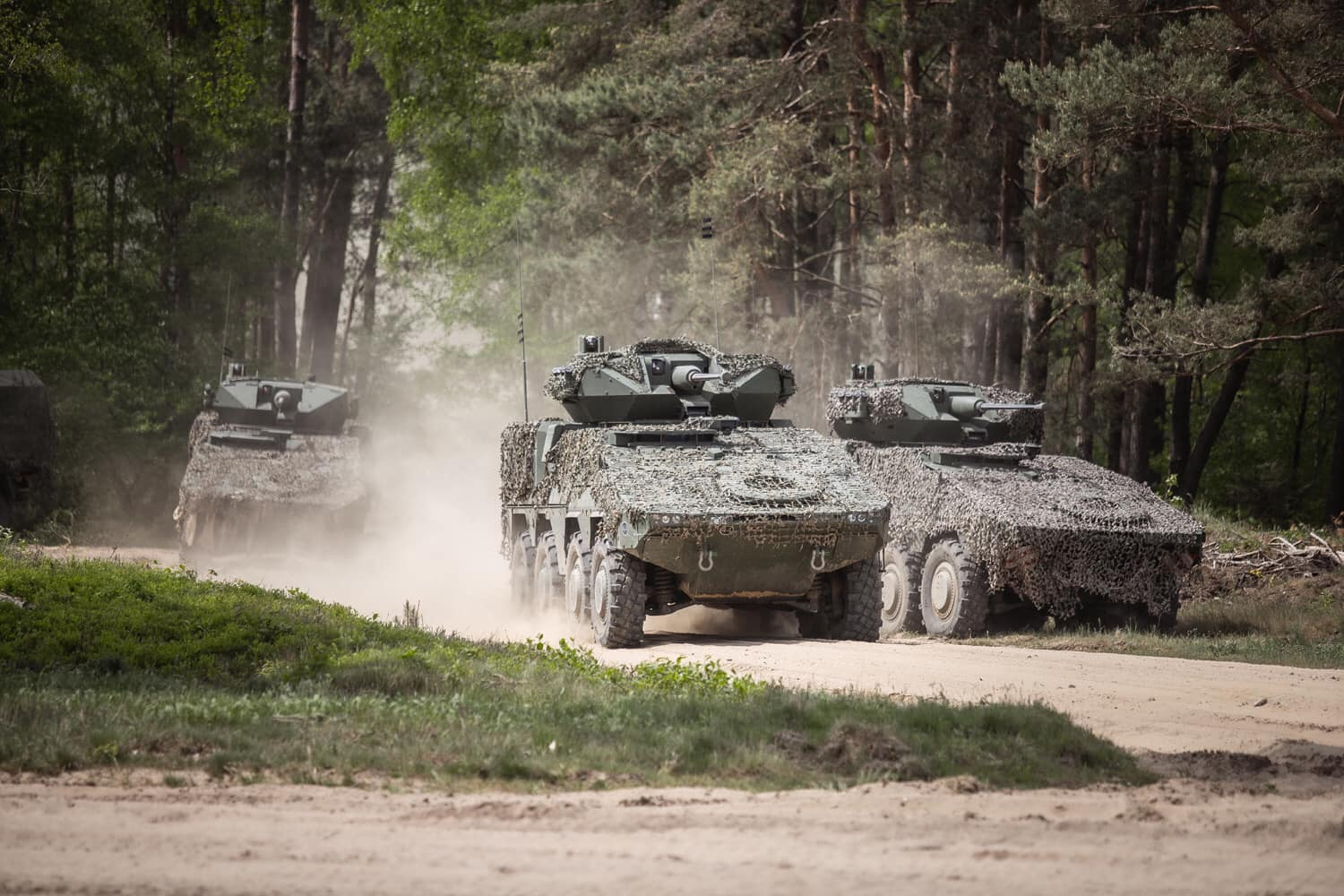
Lithuanian IFV Vilkas during an exercise.

With the reintroduction of conscription in 2015 the Lithuanian Land Force began an expansion of its main combat formations. As of August 2026 the land forces consist of the following units:

- Lithuanian Land Forces Headquarters, in Vilnius
  - Headquarters Company
  - Headquarters Supply Company
  - Signals Company
  - 1st Division, in Rukla
    - Headquarters Company
    - Signals Company
    - Reconnaissance Company
    - Logistics Company
    - Rocket Artillery Battery
    - Brigade "Iron Wolf", in Rukla
      - Headquarters and Headquarters Company, in Rukla
      - Tank Battalion, in Rukla
        - Initial Command Element
      - King Mindaugas Hussar Battalion, in Panevėžys (M113A2 armored personnel carriers)
      - Grand Duchess Birutė Uhlan Battalion, in Alytus (Vilkas infantry fighting vehicles)
      - Grand Duke Algirdas Infantry Battalion, in Rukla (Vilkas infantry fighting vehicles)
      - Duke Vaidotas Infantry Battalion, in Rokantiškės (M113A2 armored personnel carriers)
      - General Romualdas Giedraitis Artillery Battalion, in Rukla (Panzerhaubitze 2000 self-propelled howitzers)
      - Lieutenant general Jokūbas Jasinskis Logistics battalion, in Rukla
      - Reconnaissance Company, in Rukla
      - Signals Company, in Rukla
    - Brigade "Žemaitija", in Klaipėda
      - Headquarters and Headquarters Company, in Klaipėda
      - Grand Duke Butigeidis Dragoon Battalion, in Klaipėda (M113A2 armored personnel carriers)
      - Grand Duke Kęstutis Infantry Battalion, in Tauragė (M113A2 armored personnel carriers)
      - Prince Margiris Infantry Battalion, in Šiauliai (M113A2 armored personnel carriers)
      - Brigadier General Motiejus Pečiulionis Artillery Battalion, in Pajūris (M101 towed howitzers, will be replaced by self-propelled Caesar NG howitzers)
      - Logistics Battalion, in Kairiai
      - Reconnaissance Company
      - Anti-tank Company, in Klaipėda
      - Signals Company
    - Brigade "Aukštaitija", in Pajuostis
      - Initial Command Element
      - Logistics Battalion, Vilnius
    - Colonel Juozas Vitkus Engineer Regiment, in Kaunas
      - Headquarters and Supply Company
      - 1st Engineer Company
      - 2nd Engineer Company
      - Active Reserve Engineer Company
      - General Engineering Company
      - CBRN Defense Company
      - EOD Company
      - Bridging Company
    - Divisional Artillery Regiment, in Rukla
      - Initial Command Element
  - National Defence Volunteer Forces, in Vilnius
    - 1st Territorial Unit Dainava District, in Alytus
      - Headquarters & Supply Company, in Alytus
      - 9× infantry companies, in Alytus, Varėna, Lazdijai, Vilkaviškis, Marijampolė, Druskininkai, and Kalvarija
    - 2nd Territorial Unit Darius and Girėnas District, in Kaunas
      - Headquarters & Supply Company, in Kaunas
      - 9× infantry companies
    - 3rd Territorial Unit Žemaičiai District, in Klaipėda
      - Headquarters & Supply Company, in Klaipėda
      - 9× infantry companies, in Klaipėda (2×), Gargždai, Plungė, Skuodas, Šilutė, Kretinga, Tauragė, and Šilalė
    - 5th Territorial Unit Vytis District, in Panevėžys
      - Headquarters & Supply Company, in Panevėžys
      - 9× infantry companies, in Panevėžys (2×), Pasvalys, Biržai, Kupiškis, Rokiškis, Anykščiai, Utena, and Zarasai
    - 6th Territorial Unit Prisikėlimo District, in Šiauliai
      - Headquarters & Supply Company, in Šiauliai
      - 9× infantry companies Šiauliai (2×), Mažeikiai, Telšiai, Kelmė, Joniškis, Pakruojis, Radviliškis, and Naujoji Akmenė
    - 8th Territorial Unit Didžioji Kova District, in Vilnius
      - Headquarters & Supply Company, in Vilnius
      - 9× infantry companies Vilnius (2×), Nemenčinė, Trakai, Ukmergė, Molėtai, Ignalina, Švenčionys, and Šalčininkai
      - Non-kinetic Operations Company, in Vilnius
  - Juozas Lukša Training Center

== Equipment ==
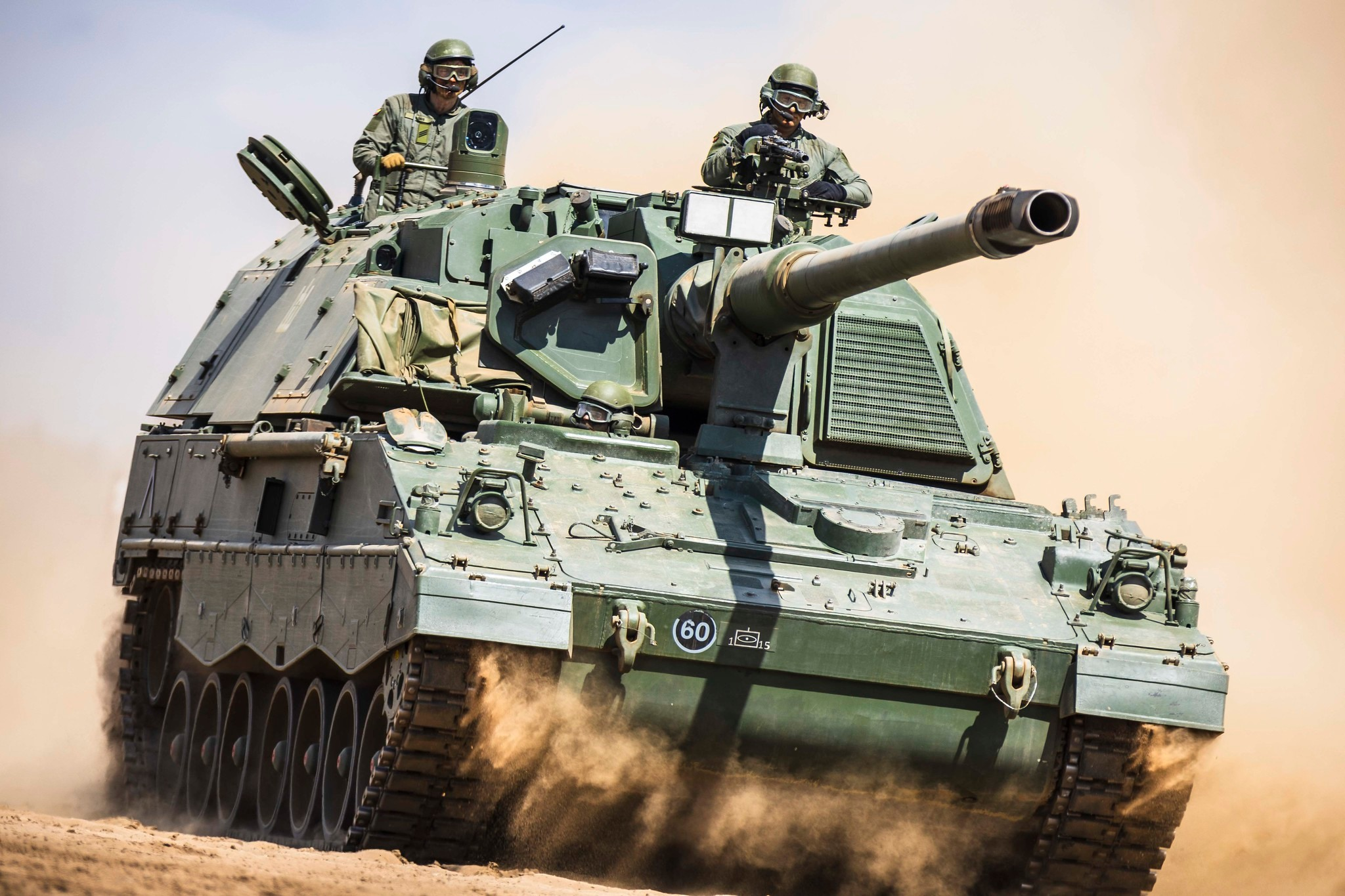
Lithuanian PzH 2000 howitzer

In reforming the Armed Forces, most of the available attention and financial resources have been directed to the development of the Land Forces. Lithuania has been modernizing its armed forces since 1990s and by now nearly all equipment is compatible with the NATO standards. The current efforts focus on increasing the firepower, acquiring new equipment and armaments, enhancing their operational effectiveness and combat training. The standard service assault rifle of the Lithuanian Armed Forces is the Heckler & Koch G36 and the standard pistol is the Glock 17, but will be replaced by Heckler & Koch VP9. The Lithuanian Land Forces are also equipped with machine guns, including the GPMG MG-3, the FN MAG, and the 12.7mm (.50 cal.) M2 Browning machine gun. They also employ the AT-4 anti-tank rockets and Carl Gustav anti-tank recoilless rifles, HK GMG high-velocity grenade launchers, and low-velocity AG-36 under-the-barrel grenade launchers, in addition to light and heavy mortars. The army also uses high-technology Lithuanian-made tactical automated commanding and controlling informational systems (TAVVIS).

== Conscription ==
=== Format ===
Conscription in Lithuania lasts 9 months. Every year a random list of 18-23-year-old men are called up to fill the 3,500 draftee requirement, however men and women up to 38 years old can apply voluntarily. In practice, only a small fraction of the conscripts need to be drafted, as the vast majority apply and serve voluntarily. After completing the 9 months service, conscripts are added to the active military reserve, where they remain for 10 years and are periodically called up to refresh their skills.

=== History ===
Conscription halted in Lithuania in 2008, as the military focused on developing the professional armed forces, and the relative geopolitical stability coupled with economic crisis didn't justify the increased spending.

Conscription was eventually reintroduced in 2015, this decision was determined by two main reasons: changed geopolitical situation and insufficient manning of the units of the Lithuanian Armed Forces. The first draft included 3,000 people, with plans to raise it to 3,500 the following year.

The deteriorating geopolitical state in 2022 reignited the debate over importance of conscription, and as of 2025 there are numerous reforms planned with the eventual goal of universal mandatory conscription. A new law will take effect starting 2026 that will, among other things, raise the quantity of enlisted conscripts from 3,500 to 4,000, change the draft pool to include all high-school graduates from 18 to 22 years old, and offer more alternative forms of service.

== Ranks ==
=== Commissioned officer ranks ===
The rank insignia of commissioned officers.

NATO code	OF-10	OF-9	OF-8	OF-7	OF-6	OF-5	OF-4	OF-3	OF-2	OF-1
Lithuanian Land Forces
Lithuanian Land Forces		Generolas	Generolas leitenantas	Generolas majoras	Brigados generolas	Pulkininkas	Pulkininkas leitenantas	Majoras	Kapitonas	Vyresnysis leitenantas	Leitenantas

=== Other ranks ===
The rank insignia of non-commissioned officers and enlisted personnel.

NATO code	OR-9	OR-8	OR-7	OR-6	OR-5	OR-4	OR-3	OR-2	OR-1
Lithuanian Land Forces
Lithuanian Land Forces	Seržantas majoras	Viršila	Štabo seržantas	Vyresnysis seržantas	Seržantas	Grandinis	Vyresnysis eilinis	Eilinis	Jaunesnysis eilinis

== Sources ==
- Hackett, James, ed. (2022-02-14). "The 2022 Military Balance Chart". The Military Balance. 122 (1). International Institute for Strategic Studies. ISSN 0459-7222.
