= List of adaptations of I Can See Your Voice =

I Can See Your Voice (abbreviated ICSYV) is an international television music game show franchise that originated in South Korea. Adaptations of it include:

== List of adaptations ==
- I Can See Your Voice (South Korean TV series), the original program
- Aš matau tavo balsą, (Note: A direct translation of the English title I Can See Your Voice) the Lithuanian version
- I Can See Your Voice (American TV series), the American version
- I Can See Your Voice (Belgian game show), the Belgian Dutch-language version
- I Can See Your Voice (British game show), the British version
- I Can See Your Voice (Chinese game show), the Chinese version
- I Can See Your Voice (Dutch game show), the Dutch version
- I Can See Your Voice (Indonesian game show), the Indonesian version
- I Can See Your Voice (Philippine game show), the Philippine version
- I Can See Your Voice Cambodia, the Cambodian version
- I Can See Your Voice Malaysia, the Malaysian Malay-language version
- I Can See Your Voice Thailand, the Thai version
- Ma näen su häält, the Estonian version
- Ya vizhu tvoy golos, the Russian version
