= Aš matau tavo balsą =

Lithuanian television game show

- Genre: Game show
- Based on: I Can See Your Voice by Lee Seon-young
- Written by: Laurynas Dubrovskis
- Directed by: Jurgis Jefremovas
- Presented by: Rokas Bernatonis
- Starring: Monika Liu; Karolina Meschino
- Country of origin: Lithuania
- Original language: Lithuanian
- No. of episodes: Regular: 6; Special: 2; Overall: 8

Production
- Executive producer: Agneta Gabalytė
- Producers: Gediminas Jaunius; Rovena Sankalienė
- Camera setup: Multi-camera
- Production companies: Elitaz; Kaunas Television Services

Original release
- Network: LNK; BTV
- Release: 13 March – 30 April 2022

Related
- I Can See Your Voice franchise

Aš matau tavo balsą (lit. 'I Can See Your Voice') is a Lithuanian television mystery music game show based on the South Korean programme of the same title, featuring its format where guest artist(s) and contestant(s) attempt to eliminate bad singers from the group, until the last mystery singer remains for a duet performance. It premiered on LNK on 13 March 2022 before moving to its sister channel BTV on 23 April 2022.

== Gameplay ==
=== Format ===
Over the course of four rounds, the guest artist(s) and contestant(s) must attempt to eliminate bad singers from a group of six "mystery singers", identified only by their occupation or alias, without ever hearing them perform live. They are assisted by clues regarding the singers' backgrounds, style of performance, and observations from a celebrity panel. At the end of a game, the last remaining mystery singer is revealed as either good or bad by means of a duet between them and one of the guest artists. (Note: Gameplay note: The number of contestants are set to one (for the rest of episodes) or a pair (ep. 6 and Slava Ukraini special).)

The contestant(s) must eliminate one mystery singer at the end of each round, receiving €1,000 if they eliminate a bad singer. At the end of a game, if the contestant(s) decide to walk away, they will keep the money had won in previous rounds; if they decide to risk for the last remaining mystery singer, they win €10,000 if a singer is good, or lose their all winnings if a singer is bad.

=== Rounds ===
1. First impression (Lithuanian: Pirmas įspūdis)
  The guest artist and contestant(s) are given some time to observe and examine each mystery singer based on their appearance.
2. Phonogram (Lithuanian: Fonograma)
  Each mystery singer performs a lip sync to a song; good singers mime to a recording of their own, while bad singers mime to a backing track by another vocalist.
3. Phone hacking (Lithuanian: Nulaužtas telefonas)
  The guest artist and contestant(s) are presented with a video package containing possible clues by one of the mystery singers.
4. Cross-examination (Lithuanian: Kryžminė apklausa)
  The guest artist and contestant(s) may ask questions to the remaining mystery singers. Good singers are required to give truthful responses, while the bad singers must lie.

== Production ==
=== Development ===
Following the success of Kaukės, the LNK Group (of MG Media) formally acquired the rights to produce a Lithuanian adaptation of I Can See Your Voice as part of CJ ENM's dealing with Fremantle in November 2020, with Elitaz and Kaunas Television Services co-assigning on production duties.

=== Filming ===
Filming of the show took place at Avia Solutions Group Arena in Vilnius; due to the COVID-19 pandemic, health and safety protocols are also implemented.

Originally, nine episodes were completed production except one episode involving guest artist Egidijus Dragūnas and celebrity panelist Juozas Statkevičius, which did never air according to LNK spokesperson Gediminas Malaškevičius in March 2022, due to their controversial comments related to the Russian invasion of Ukraine.

== Episodes ==
=== Guest artists ===
Legend:
Good singer
Bad singer
— The contestant(s) chose to risk the money.
— The contestant(s) chose to walk away with the money.

Episode		Guest artist (Note: Players' notes: For the returning guest artists (who also include foreigners and former good singers), names are displayed in italics.; For the mixed groups, names who identified as bad singers are displayed in italics.)	Contestant(s)	Mystery singers (In their respective numbers and aliases)					
#	Date	Guest artist	Contestant(s)	Elimination order					Winner
#	Date	Guest artist	Contestant(s)	First impression	Phonogram	Phone hacking		Cross-examination	Winner
1	13 March 2022	Vaidas Baumila	Aurelijus Laurinavičius → €3,000	1. Emilija Vaičiūnaitė; (Ballroom Dancer)	5. Laura Dragūnaitė; (Boxer)	6. Dainius Armanavičius; (Motorcycle Rider)	2. Lina Kelmelienė; (Civil Engineer)	4. Rimtautas Balevičius; (Sports Shooter)	3. Alvydė Kniuipytė; Kindergarten Teacher
Special	20 March 2022	Moniqué	Giedrius Savickas and Džiugas Siaurusaitis → €0	1. Skaistė Matonytė; (Handball Player)	5. Ieva Rusaitė; (Promotional Model)	2. Beatričė Jevdokimovaitė; (Zumba Dancer)	6. Šarūnas Navickas; (Blood Donor)	4. Edas Vieta; (Vegan)	3. Andžej Gogol; Paintball Player
2	27 March 2022	Monika Marija	Evaldas Venskutonis → €10,000	6. Paulius Mačiuitis; (Traveler)	5. Artūras Jakovenka; (Basketball Fan)	1. Evaldas Ragelis; (Builder)	4. Deividas Dubinovas; (Events Manager)	3. Rosita Remenčiūtė; (Street Dancer)	2. Rugilė Stankevičiūtė; School Vice-President
3	3 April 2022	KaYra	Viktorija Laksaitė → €10,000	5. Benediktas Drungėla; (Soldier)	6. Martyna Puskunigytė; (Abstract Artist)	3. Patricija Ščetko; (Fencer)	4. Saulius Žiurinskas; (Driving Instructor)	1. Agnė Sruogytė; (Boxer)	2. Erika Gerybaitė; Public Relations Specialist
4	10 April 2022	Inga Valinskienė	Saulius Ramoška → €4,000	4. Nedas Rupšys; (Footballer)	6. Edvinas Krupinskas; (TikToker)	1. Algirdas Bagdonavičius; (Fisherman)	3. Mindaugas Jocys; (Chemist)	5. Evelina Čiurlionė; (Poker Player)	2. Meda Borisaitė; Stylist
5	17 April 2022	Irena Starošaitė and Žilvinas Žvagulis	Ernest Ekhardt → €10,000	3. Nerijus Liubertas; (Car Enthusiast)	4. Ema Zenauskytė; (Train Attendant)	2. Ksenija Amadėja; (Musical Therapist)	5. Antanas Jakimavičius; (Opinion Maker)	6. Martyna Valaitytė; (Pastry Chef)	1. Eimantas Bešėnas; Mushroom Picker
6	23 April 2022	Vilius Tarasovas and Violeta Riaubiškytė-Tarasovienė	Aivaras and Brigita Povilionis → €4,000	2. Lukas Mačiulaitis; (Chef)	4. Eglė Vosyliūtė; (Courier Woman)	6. Justyna Paliczuk; (Peacock Breeder)	1. Sintija Kivlina; (Ballroom Dancer)	5. Eva Navickaitė; (Volleyball Player)	3. Estera Olendraitė; Jeweller
Special	30 April 2022	3d (Vaida Genytė, Aistė Pilvelytė, and Rūta Ščiogolevaitė)	Diana Stalioraitė → €0	5. Emilija Gogolytė; (Photographer)	4. Diana Janaudytė; (Cosplayer)	2. Artiom Stepan Triskin; (Painter)	6. Stanley Ogburie; (Fitness Instructor)	1. Ignas Stonkus; (Sommelier)	3. Vitalija Timko; Accountant

=== Panelists ===
Legend:
Regular panelist
Guest panelist

Apps		Panelists in attendance (Sorted by first appearance, with episode designations)
g#	p#	Panelists in attendance (Sorted by first appearance, with episode designations)
8	1	Karolina Meschino (1–6; sp. 1–2)
6	1	Monika Liu (1–2, 4–5; sp. 1–2)
1	15	Radži and Saugirdas Vaitulionis (1); Adomas Grinius and Indrė Kavaliauskaitė (sp. 1); Dalia Belickaitė and Rimvydas Širvinskas (2); Egmontas Bžeskas, Livija Gradauskienė, and Andrius Talžūnas (3); Gintarė Gurevičiūtė and Mantas Žmuidinavičius (4); Džilda and Orestas Vaigauskas (5); Jonas Braškys and Larisa Kalpokaitė (6)
