= Hubertas Grušnys =

Lithuanian businessman (1961–2006)

Hubertas Grušnys (19 June 1961 – 21 October 2006) was a Lithuanian media proprietor. His business was focused on running three national and two regional radio stations in Lithuania. He was also vice-president of the Lithuanian Association of Broadcasters.

Grušnys was born in Vilnius. From 1984, he studied at the law faculty of Vilnius University. In 1989, with a partner, Hubertas Grušnys launched the radio station "M-1", the first-ever private in Lithuania and the post-communist Eastern Europe.

On 12 January 1998, Grušnys led consortium bought a controlling 56% stake in the LNK television. After the acquisition, a large scale editorial turmoil rippled through the network with many staff and anchors resigning, leaving and being replaced by newly brought in people. Just months later, in September, Grušnys flipped the channel to Bonnier Group, which secured purchase of full ownership of the company.

Following this sale Grušnys returner to radio and in 1999 acquired another national radio station Ultra vires, which he transformed into Lietus.

Herbertas Grušnys died in a crash of a private plane (Diamond DA42 Twin Star) near the Pociūnai Airport, Prienai. In 2026, Grušnys was posthumously awarded "For Contribution to the Lithuanian Music Business and Culture" during the 15th M.A.M.A. awards.

== Sources, external links ==
- Speakers and members of the jury at MITIL 02
- Interview with H. Grušnys (in Lithuanian)
