= Dainų dainelė =

Lithuanian singing competition for children

Dainų dainelė (transl. Song of Songs) is a Lithuanian singing competition for children ages 3 to 19 established in 1974. The competition takes place every two years and is organized by the National M. K. Čiurlionis School of Art under the direction of the Lithuanian Ministry of Education and Science (prior to 1998, it was organized by the Ministry of Education and the Lithuanian National Radio and Television). It is a popular and well attended competition. By 2014, it was estimated that more than 200,000 children competed at Dainų dainelė.

== History ==
The first competition was held in spring 1974. The idea of the competition was raised by Aldona Šimaitytė, an employee of the Lithuanian National Radio and Television, in 1972. The competition's name comes from a Lithuanian folk song that was popularized by Mikalojus Konstantinas Čiurlionis. The goal of the event was to provide more varied children's programing and to encourage and promote children's musical education. In 1974, the final concert was held at the Lithuanian National Philharmonic Society and featured 15 soloists and 14 ensembles. At the national concerts in 1976, there were 175 soloists and 129 ensembles, or a total of 1,240 singers.

In 1992–1998, Lithuanian children from abroad were invited to participate in the competition. The practice was discontinued due to budget cuts in 2000.

In 1998, the competition was reorganized. The main organizational work was delegated to the National M. K. Čiurlionis School of Art. The competition grew to a festival – concerts of the national stage were organized and televised from various cities across Lithuania. The festival format was abandoned in 2006. In 2020, the national stage was interrupted by the COVID-19 pandemic. The concerts resumed in September 2020.

== Format ==
Some 20,000 children audition for the competition. The children are divided into four groups based on age. From the beginning, there were three rounds of selections (school, region, and national). Since 2006, there are four rounds of selections – school, municipal, regional, and national. The selection process starts in November. The regional selections take place in January–February. The number of regions has varied from 11 to 15 from 2002 to 2014. The concerts usually take place in schools or cultural centers.

Selected performers then move on to the national stage. The number of performers on the national stage ranged from 376 in 2010 to 475 in 2014. The concerts of the national stage take place in Vilnius and are shown on the Lithuanian National Radio and Television. In 2006–2022, the number of concerts varied between 9 and 15. The finalists (referred to as the laureates) perform at the Lithuanian National Opera and Ballet Theatre. About 300 singers perform in the final concert.

== Repertoire ==
At first, singers were selected only from regular schools and the repertoire was limited to simple songs. When more singers were selected from music schools, the repertoire became more varied and complex. Prior to 1990, the repertoire required to include Soviet or communist songs. Many songs were performed in Russian. In response, teachers and composers started adapting and reinterpreting Lithuanian folk songs or classical songs. For example, in 1978, out of 654 songs performed at the national stage, 160 were folk songs and 39 were classical songs.

In 1992–1998, it was popular to perform English, French, Italian, and other western songs. In 1998, singers were allowed to perform original songs. In 2006, competition rules were revised to require singers to be prepared to perform three different songs, one of which must be a Lithuanian folk song. In 2012, at the republican stage, a total of 1,347 songs were performed: 458 folk songs, 755 songs by Lithuanian composers, and 134 songs by foreign composers.

Prior to 1988, the final concert concluded with all singers coming together to sing "May There Always Be Sunshine" by Arkady Ostrovsky. For the next ten years, the organizers asked composers to write a song specifically for the competition. This tradition was broken in 1998, when they chose "Lietuva – Dainų šalis" (Lithuania – Land of Songs) by Jaroslavas Cechanovičius and Stasys Žlibinas as the permanent closing act. The song was written specifically for the competition in 1992.

== Participants ==
Notable laureates include:

- Radžis Aleksandrovičius, pop singer
- Viktorija Bakan, opera singer
- Ilona Balsytė, actress
- Albertas Chazbijavičius, circus artist
- Vaida Genytė became famous with the song "Chunga-Changa" by Vladimir Shainsky and Yuri Entin performed in 1980. She became a finalist of Dainų dainelė four times (1980, 1982, 1986, 1988).
- Mirga Gražinytė-Tyla, conductor
- Vytautas Juozapaitis, opera singer
- Rafailas Karpis, opera singer
- Rasa Kaušiūtė, singer
- Ruslanas Kirilkinas, singer
- Ona Kolobovaitė, singer, actress
- Judita Leitaitė, opera singer
- Inesa Linaburgytė, opera singer
- Monika Linkytė, singer
- Monika Liu, singer-songwriter
- Liudas Mikalauskas, opera singer
- Donny Montell, singer
- Audrius Rubežius, opera singer
- Evelina Sašenko, jazz singer
- Edmundas Seilius, opera singer
- Gintarė Skėrytė, opera singer
- Deividas Staponkus, opera singer
- Aušrinė Stundytė, opera singer
- Loreta Sungailienė, TV presenter
- Vilius Tarasovas, pop singer
- Merūnas Vitulskis, opera singer

== Bibliography ==
- Didžiulienė, Irena (2014). 40 metų mūsų "Dainų dainelei" (PDF) (in Lithuanian). Vilnius: Nacionalinė M.K. Čiurlionio menų mokykla.
- Talalytė, Miglė (15 April 2016). ""90 dainų – 90 legendų" skambėjo "Dainų dainelės" laureatų balsai". LRT.lt (in Lithuanian).
- Vanagienė, Irena (31 January 2020) [2003]. ""Dainų dainelė"". Visuotinė lietuvių enciklopedija (in Lithuanian). Mokslo ir enciklopedijų leidybos centras.
