= Lafesta =

Lafesta may refer to:

- Hyundai Lafesta, name of a mid-size sedan produced and sold by Beijing Hyundai in China
- Nissan Lafesta, name of a compact MPV built by Nissan for the Asian market
- Lafesta (radio station), the first Lithuanian Internet radio station
