= Lapės =

- Town
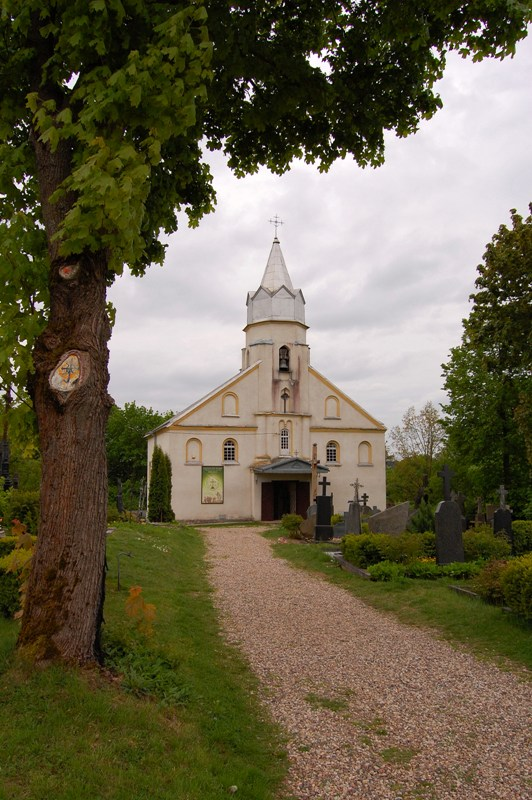
- Lapės church

- Flag Coat of arms

- Location in Lithuania
- Coordinates: 54°58′40″N 24°0′40″E
- Country: Lithuania
- Ethnographic region: Aukštaitija
- County: Kaunas County

Population (2011)
  - Total: 1,218
- Time zone: UTC+2 (EET)
  - Summer (DST): UTC+3 (EEST)

Lapės (transl. foxes) is a small town in Kaunas County in central Lithuania. In 2011 it had a population of 1,218.

== History ==
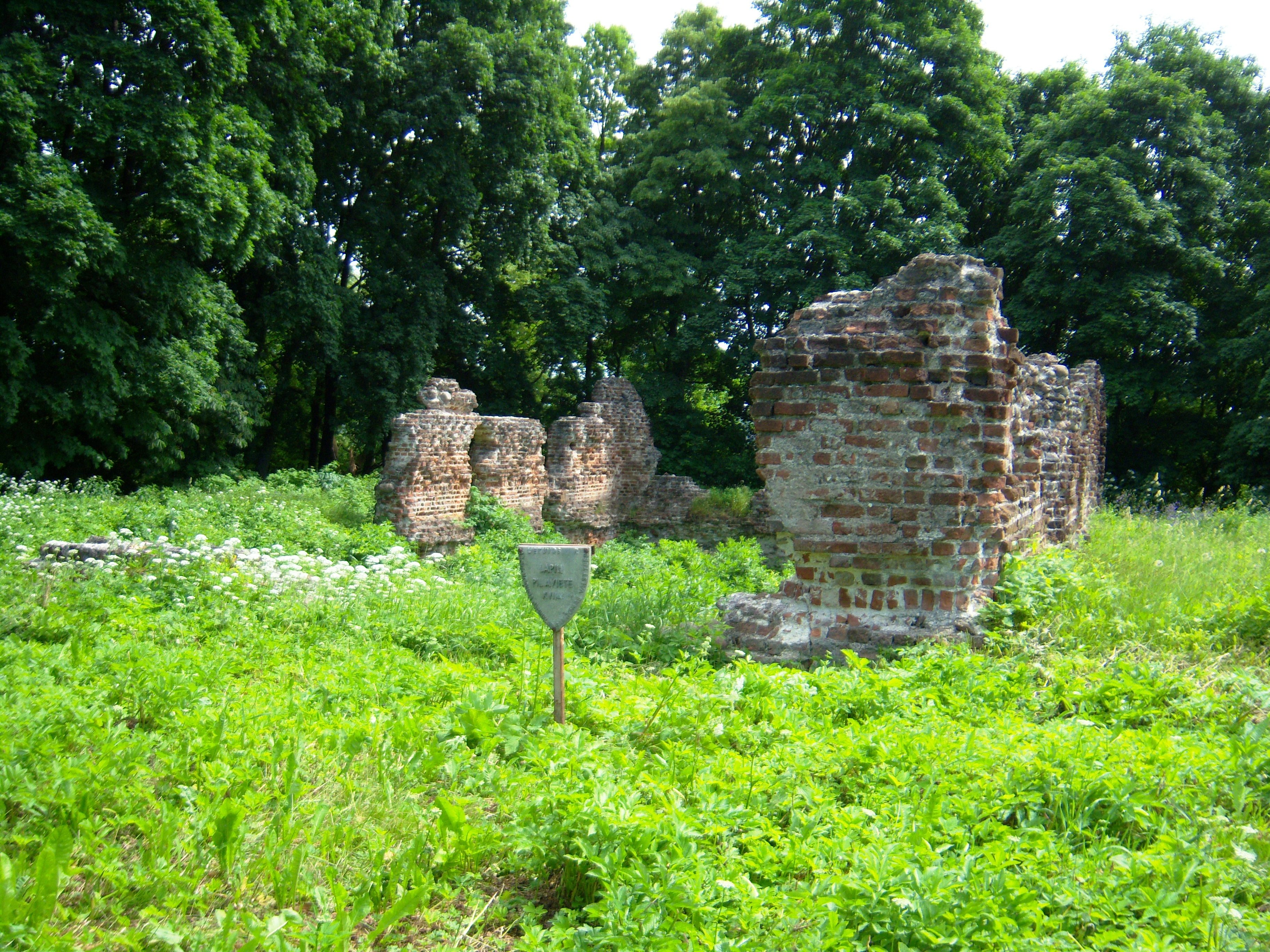
Ruins of Lapės Manor

The village was first mentioned in sources in 1591, as Lapės manor which belonged to the castellan of Kraków Seweryn Boner and later the noble Polish family Czacki, and subsequently, it belonged to the families: Siwicki, Ratowt, and in the 19th century to Kacper and Józef Sokołowski.

A church was built in 1639. Lapės thrived in mid-17th century, when the manor was ruled by Jonas Alfonsas Liackis, the Elder of Samogitia and the castellan of Vitebsk. The manor house is believed to have been destroyed in 1654–1667 during war with Russia.

In 1899, the church was renovated and enlarged by Father Andrius Rakauskas and his parishioners. Since 1919 Lapės has been the centre of the parish. In the interwar period, the village had an agricultural cooperative, a small credit union and an orphanage. The last owner of Lapės Manor was the Prime Minister of independent Lithuania Antanas Merkys. During his ownership, a new manor house was built and it became a summer residence, often visited by President Antanas Smetona.

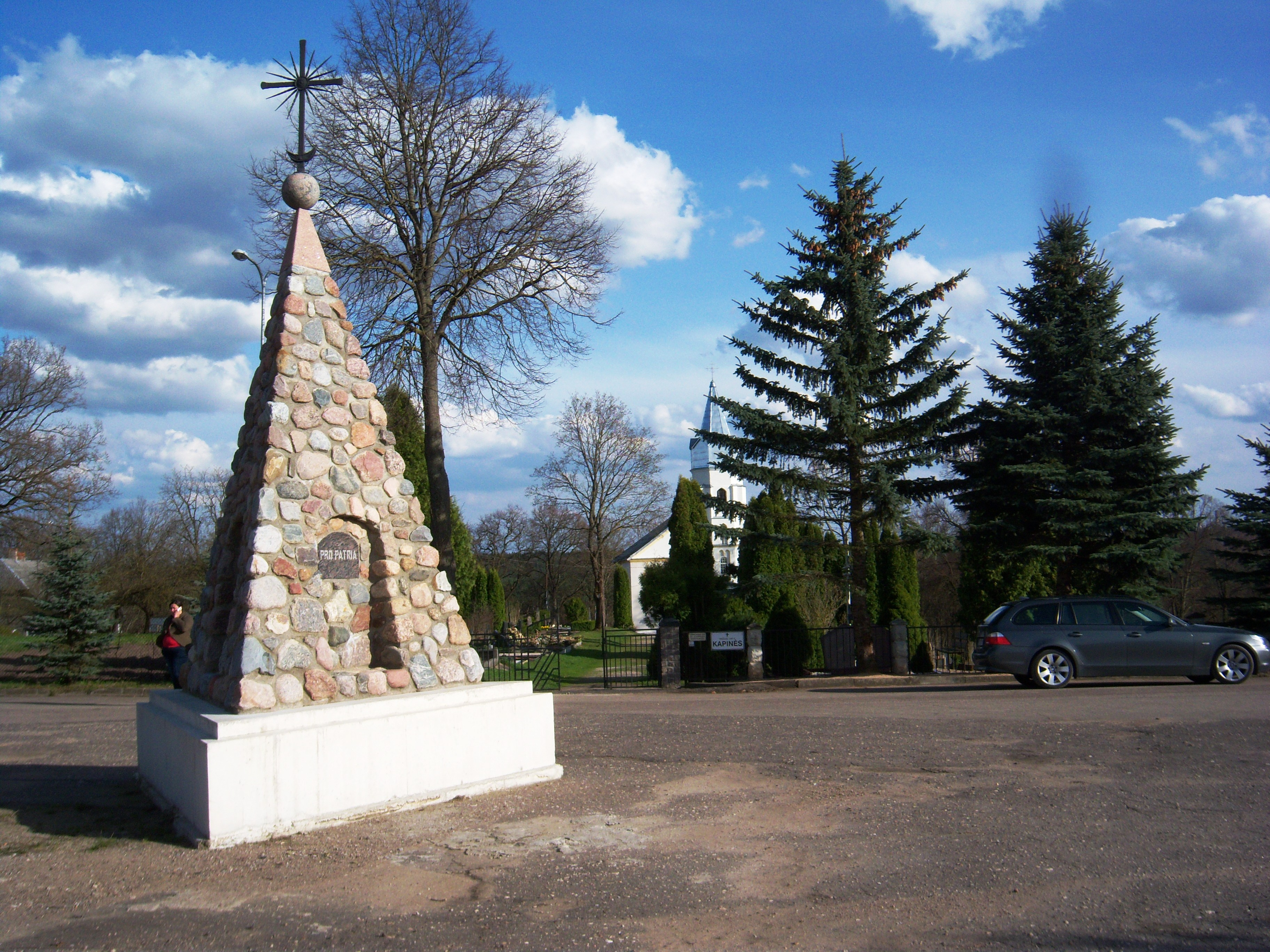
Monument to Lithuanian Wars of Independence

In 1985, the manor buildings burnt down. The manor was replaced by a large and modern, at the time, building, which housed the Lapės Farm Administration and the House of Culture, later the building was used by LNK television channel, and in 2002 the building was bought by the eldership's administration. To commemorate Antanas Merkys, the village's main street was named after him, and a bust was erected in 1991. A monument dedicated to those who died for the freedom of Lithuania was rebuilt, which originally stood since 1928 but was destroyed during the Soviet era. In 2005 flag and coat of arms of Lapės were adopted by the decree of the President of the Republic of Lithuania Valdas Adamkus.

According to 1923 Lithuanian census town's population was 4604 with 3 109 Poles, 1 089 Lithuanians, 321 Russians, 39 Jews, 27 Germans and 19 of other ethnicities.
