= TV11 (Lithuania) =

Defunct television channel in Lithuania

- Country: Lithuania

Programming
- Language: Lithuanian

Ownership
- Owner: UAB "TV11"

History
- Launched: October 1996
- Closed: April 2, 2010

TV11 was regional television channel, which started operations in October 1996, which broadcast in the Vilnius area, covering a radius of 80 kilometers.

TV11 provided a line-up that satisfied a variety of tastes - from entertainment, information, cultural programs to films of various genres every day, as well as concerts on Fridays.

TV11 was the only television station that provided viewers with the opportunity to watch the matches of the Latvia Open Ice Hockey Championship, the Lithuanian Men's Handball Championship matches and other sports competitions.

== Violations ==
On August 31, 2005, the channel violated advertising laws upon assessing that its block of infomercials took over more than one fifth of its daily airtime.

TV11 violated broadcasting regulations in November 2007 for an airing of the film Deadly Harvest outside of watershed hours, even though it received an N-14 rating. A group of specialists assessed that the film "depicts gratuitous violence and glorifies violence and cruelty". Due to its nature, an S rating was recommended for the film. The channel received a fine of 2,000 litas in December.

== Bankruptcy history ==
On October 27, 2009, TV11 filed for a bankruptcy case.

On January 12, 2010 at 16:00, LRTC turned off TV11's terrestrial transmissions due to debts. Until its closing, the channel was only available for cable television companies.

On April 2, 2010, TV11 closed full transmissions.

== See also ==
- Lietuvos Rytas TV (Note: When Vilniaus TV was active.)
