= Grand Duke Kęstutis Infantry Battalion =

Grand Duke Kęstutis of Lithuania Infantry Battalion
- Lietuvos didžiojo kunigaikščio Kęstučio pėstininkų batalionas
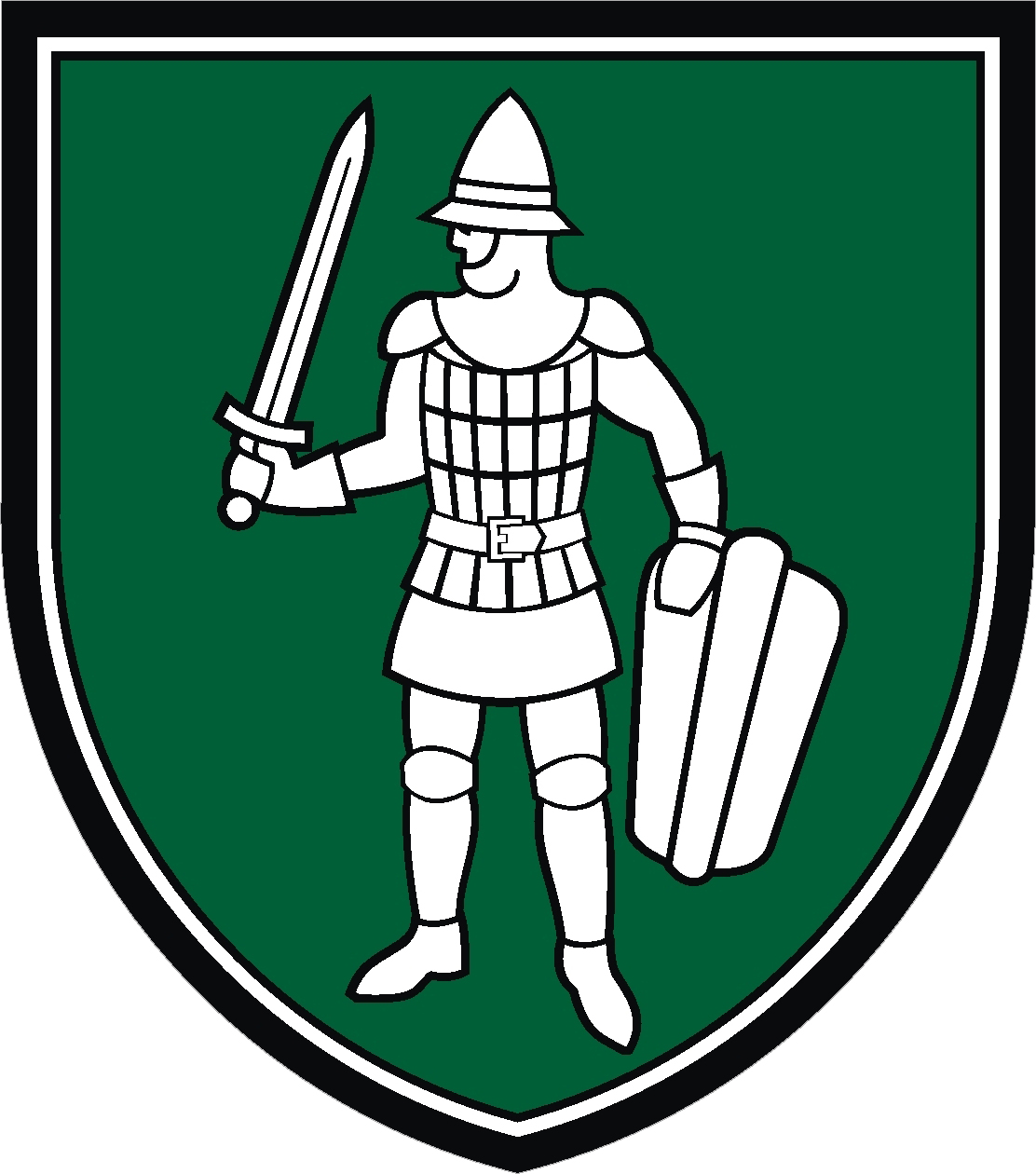
- Insignia of the Battalion
- Active: 1992 - Present
- Country: Lithuania
- Allegiance: Lithuania
- Branch: Lithuanian Armed Forces
- Type: Infantry; Light Infantry Battalion
- Role: Territorial defense, rapid response operations
- Part of: Lithuanian Land Force
- Garrison/HQ: Sakalinė
- Nickname: "Kęstutis' Warriors"
- Patron: Lithuanian Grand Duke Kęstutis
- Mottos: Už Lietuvą ir laisvę (For Lithuania and Freedom)
- Colors: Green and Gold
- Anniversaries: 15 June (Battalion Day); 3 November (Death anniversary of Grand Duke Kęstutis)
- Engagements: Afghanistan; Iraq War

Commanders
- Commander: Lieutenant Colonel Mindaugas Steponavičius
- Deputy Commander: Major Arūnas Valinskas
- Notable commanders: Colonel Valdas Tutkus; Lieutenant Colonel Jonas Kronkaitis

Insignia
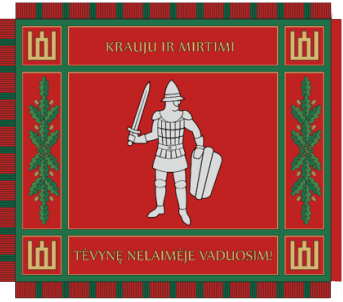
- Battalion Insignia

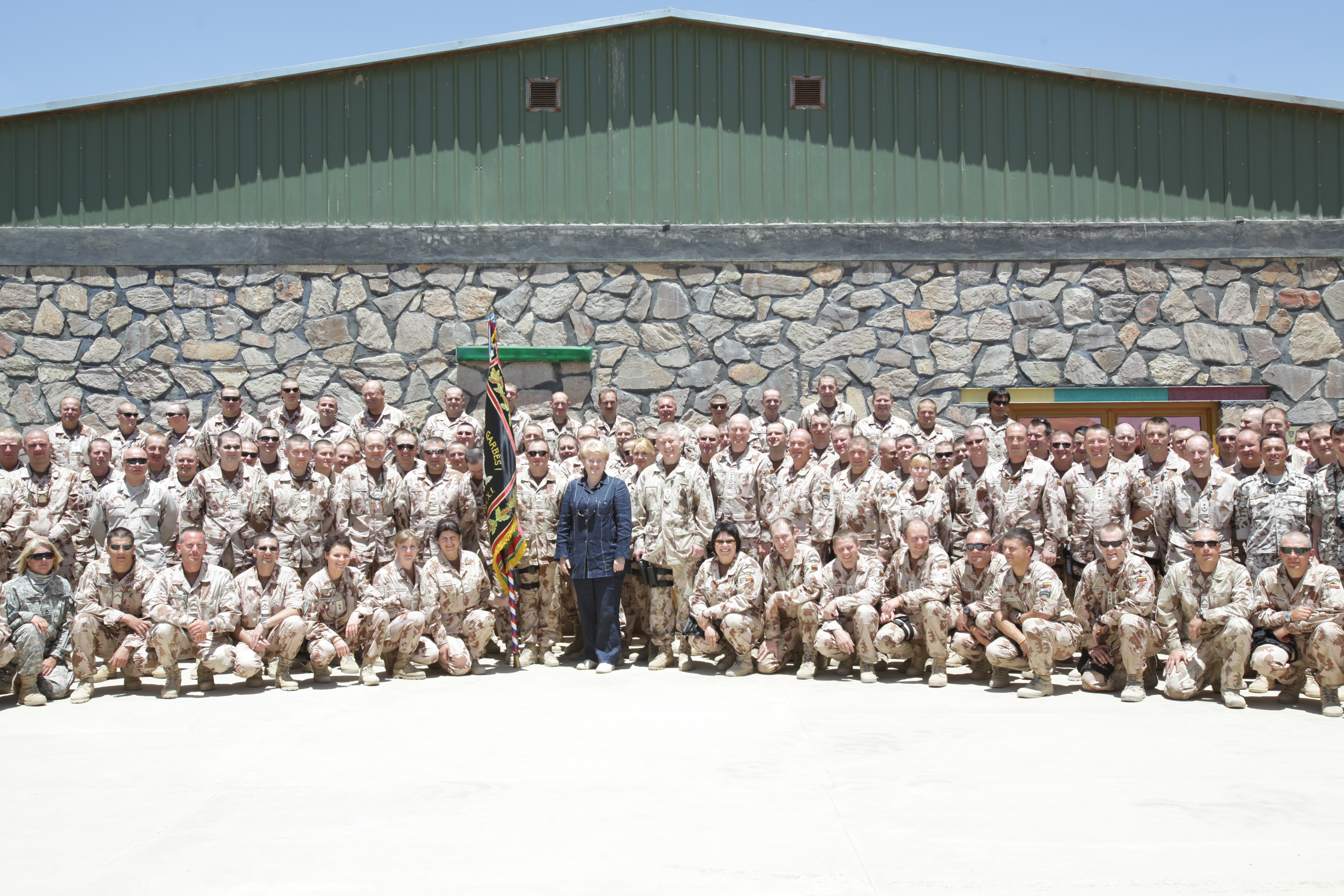
Lithuanian president Dalia Grybauskaitė with Grand Duke Kęstutis Infantry Battalion soldiers in Afghanistan.

The Grand Duke Kęstutis of Lithuania Infantry Battalion is an infantry battalion of the Lithuanian Armed Forces. Established in 1992 following Lithuania's restoration of independence, the battalion serves as one of the primary infantry units within the Lithuanian Land Forces.

== History ==
=== Formation ===
The battalion was formed on November 25, 1992, as part of the reorganization of the newly independent Lithuanian Armed Forces. Named after Kęstutis, the 14th-century Grand Duke of Lithuania known for his military leadership against the Teutonic Order, the battalion was initially established as a light infantry unit focused on territorial defense.

=== Early years (1992-2004) ===
During its first decade, the battalion underwent intensive training and modernization programs to meet NATO standards. The unit participated in numerous joint exercises with other Baltic states and international partners, gradually developing its operational capabilities.

=== NATO integration (2004-present) ===
Following Lithuania's accession to NATO in 2004, the battalion underwent significant restructuring to align with Alliance standards. The unit has since participated in international operations, including deployments to Afghanistan as part of the International Security Assistance Force (ISAF) and Resolute Support Mission.

== Organization ==
The battalion consists of approximately 600-800 personnel organized into:

- Battalion Headquarters
- Three Infantry Companies
- Combat Support Company
- Logistics Support Company

Each infantry company is further divided into three infantry platoons and one weapons platoon equipped with mortars and anti-tank weapons.

== Training and operations ==
The battalion maintains a high state of readiness through regular training exercises, including:

- Annual participation in Exercise Iron Wolf, Lithuania's largest military exercise
- Joint training with NATO allies during Exercise Saber Strike
- Urban warfare training at the Pabradė Training Area

== International deployments ==
The battalion has contributed personnel to several international missions:

- Afghanistan (2005-2021): Rotational deployments to Ghor Province as part of the Lithuanian-led Provincial Reconstruction Team
- Iraq (2003-2008): Security operations in MND South-East
- UNIFIL (2014-present): Peacekeeping operations in southern Lebanon

== Traditions and symbols ==
The battalion's traditions draw heavily from the legacy of Grand Duke Kęstutis and Lithuanian military history. The unit's insignia features the Columns of Gediminas and a stylized representation of Trakai Island Castle, which was associated with Kęstutis.

The battalion celebrates its founding day on November 25 and commemorates the death of Grand Duke Kęstutis on November 3 with ceremonial activities and historical education programs for its personnel.

== Equipment ==
The battalion is equipped with modern infantry weapons and equipment, including:

- Heckler & Koch G36 assault rifles
- FN MAG machine guns
- Carl Gustav M4 anti-tank weapons
- M113 armored personnel carriers (selected units)

== See also ==
- Lithuanian Armed Forces
- Lithuanian Land Forces
- Iron Wolf Mechanised Infantry Brigade
- Grand Duke Gediminas Staff Battalion
