= Miss Captivity Pageant =

Lithuanian television program

The Miss Captivity Pageant was a Lithuanian television program produced by Arūnas Valinskas that aired in 2002, the program was a beauty contest held in the Panevezys Penal Labour Colony.

== Premise ==
The show began as a joke between producers, but turned out to be a rating hit. A total of 39 contestants entered, with 8 selected for the show competing for the title of "Miss Captivity". Unfortunately, one of the inmates was removed from the prison for questioning before the show started, so only seven eventually featured. The show took part in Panevezys Female Labour Colony, located approximately 140 km north of Vilnius - it is the only all-female prison in Lithuania, and holds over a thousand inmates.

The winner of the contest was a woman competing under the pseudonym "Samanta", who was later revealed to be Kristina Paliulionytė. Second place was a woman going by the name of "Inga", and third place was "Tatjana".

The prizes for the contest were 4000 litas for first place, 2500 litas for second place, and 1000 litas for third place. The prizes were to be awarded after the women finished their sentences.

During the week in which the competition was filmed, the participants were excused from working in the prison's sewing factory.

== In other countries ==
Other prisons have followed suit, and now host their own beauty pageants, including "Miss Max" inside the Penitenciária Feminina da Capital in São Paulo, and another in Langata Women's prison in Kenya. Documentaries named Miss Gulag and La Corona which treat the subject of beauty pageants inside women's prisons in Russia and Colombia respectively have been made.
