= TV1 (Lithuanian TV channel) =

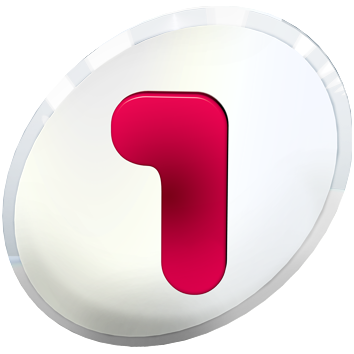
- Country: Lithuania

Ownership
- Owner: Laisvas ir nepriklausomas kanalas, UAB
- Key people: Nida Nakrošienė, General Director
- Sister channels: LNK; BTV; Info TV; 2TV

History
- Launched: 29 April 2003

Links
- Webcast: https://lnk.lt/tiesiogiai#tv1

TV1 (TV vienas) is a TV channel in Lithuania, launched in 2003. It is a sister channel of LNK television. In 2018 TV1 logo has been changed and placed up left corner on the screen. April 29, 2003 – 2005 TV1 broadcast only in Vilnius, Klaipėda and the surroundings of these cities. Since 2005 began to be broadcast in Kaunas.

== See also ==
- List of Lithuanian television channels
