= Arūnas Valinskas (born 1989) =

Lithuanian politician (born 1989)

Member of the Seimas
- Incumbent
- Assumed office 13 November 2020

Personal details
- Born: 10 October 1989 (age 36)
- Party: Homeland Union
- Parents: Arūnas Valinskas (father); Ingrida Valinskienė (mother)

Arūnas Valinskas (born 10 October 1989) is a Lithuanian politician of the Homeland Union. Since 2020, he has been a member of the Seimas. He was an assistant to Mykolas Majauskas from 2018 to 2020, and was elected to the Vilnius City Council in 2019. He is the son of television producer Arūnas Valinskas.
