= Vaida Genytė =

Lithuanian singer

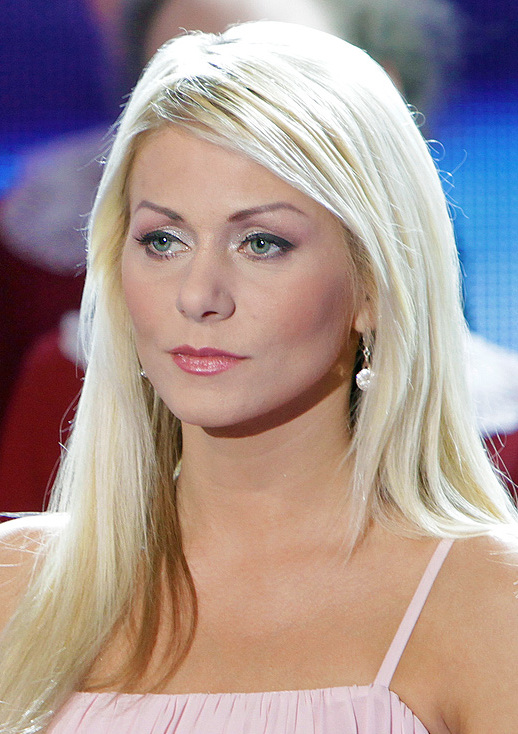

Background information
- Born: Vaida Genytė; 29 November 1974 (age 51); Panevėžys, Lithuania
- Genres: Pop; musical; classical
- Occupations: Singer; television presenter
- Instrument: Vocals

Vaida Genytė-Marazienė (born 29 November 1974) is a Lithuanian singer (soprano), TV host and music teacher.

== Biography ==
Genytė was born in Panevėžys, but after a week with her parents moved to Anykščiai. She lived here for 3 years, after which she went to Molėtai where she grew up.

In 1980, Genytė became a laureate of the Dainų dainelė singing competition for the song "Chunga-Changa". From 1981 to 1992, he studied at Molėtai Gymnasium. From 1992 to 1995, she studied at Panevėžys Conservatory, acquiring the specialty of music teacher.

In 2008, Genytė along with Alanas Chošnau participated in LNK musical show "Star Duets 2" (won the second place), LRT musical project "Arc de Triomphe". From 2008 to 2012, she hosted LTV wired "Millennium Children". From January–May 2010, she and Kastytis Barisas participated in the LNK musical show "Star Duets 4", reaching the semifinals with the choir "Ave Vita".

Genytė is married to Aidas Marazas and they have a son Ainis.

== Theatrical activity ==
"Žmogus iš La Mančos" (Lithuanian National Drama Theatre).
