= M-1 (Lithuanian radio station) =

Coordinates: 54°42′8″N 25°13′17″E

M1
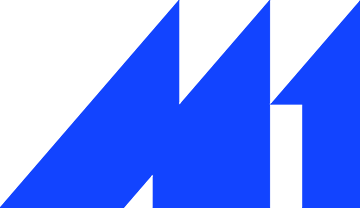
- Lithuania
- Frequencies: Vilnius: 106.8 MHz; Kaunas: 106.6 MHz; Klaipėda: 106.5 MHz; Šiauliai: 106.3 MHz; Panevėžys: 106.0 MHz; Alytus: 106.0 MHz; Biržai: 99.8 MHz; Druskininkai: 106.5 MHz; Ignalina: 105.9 MHz; Kėdainiai: 92.8 MHz; Marijampolė: 106.3 MHz; Raseiniai: 90.7 MHz; Tauragė: 106.2 MHz; Telšiai: 106.0 MHz; Utena: 106.3 MHz

Ownership
- Owner: 15min grupė (2024–present)

Links
- Website: http://m-1.15min.lt/

M1 is the first commercial radio station in Lithuania, broadcasting from the capital city of Vilnius. The station was established on 31 December 1989 by Hubertas Grušnys.

The first song played on M1 was "Radio Ga Ga" by Queen. In 2022, the radio station had €4.6 million in revenue.
