= Laluna (radio station) =

Coordinates: 55.6837°N 21.1632°E

Laluna FM
- Klaipėda; Lithuania
- Frequency: 94.9 (MHz)
- Branding: "Laluna FM"

Programming
- Format: Music Radio

Ownership
- Owner: Radijo stotis Laluna

History
- First air date: 25 August 1995

Links
- Website: https://www.laluna.lt

Laluna is a music radio station that is licensed to Klaipėda, Lithuania.

== History ==
The station began broadcasting on 25 August 1995 and now it is the most popular radio station in Klaipėda.

== Programs ==
- Lalunos Top 40
- Gyventi gera
- Ant Bangos
- Ko širdelė geidžia
- Geriausi vakarai
- Savaitgalio Žadintuvas
- Naktis Su Laluna
