= Info TV =

Lithuanian news television station

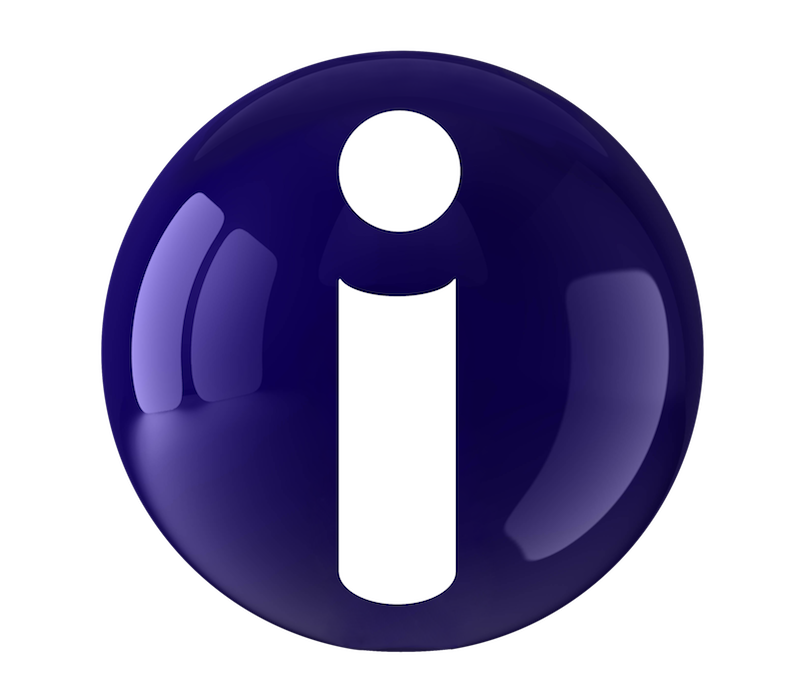
- Country: Lithuania

Ownership
- Owner: Laisvas ir nepriklausomas kanalas, UAB
- Sister channels: LNK; BTV; TV1; 2TV

History
- Launched: 12 November 2007

Links
- Webcast: lnk.lt/tiesiogiai#infotv

Info TV is a Lithuanian news television station owned and operated by LNK. It began to air on 12 November 2007. The channel range includes 97% of Lithuanian television users. Since 5 March 2012, Info TV airs 24/7. On 1 December 2018, the channel started broadcasting in HD, along with the other LNK Group channels - LNK, BTV and TV1.

== News ==
Info TV demonstrates a 4 hours-long news show called "Infodiena" which broadcasts via INFO TV, BTV and LNK TV news. "Infodiena" is displayed from Monday to Friday from 5 p.m. to 9 p.m. This show is the longest TV news programme in the Lithuanian television.
