= 2TV (Lithuanian TV channel) =

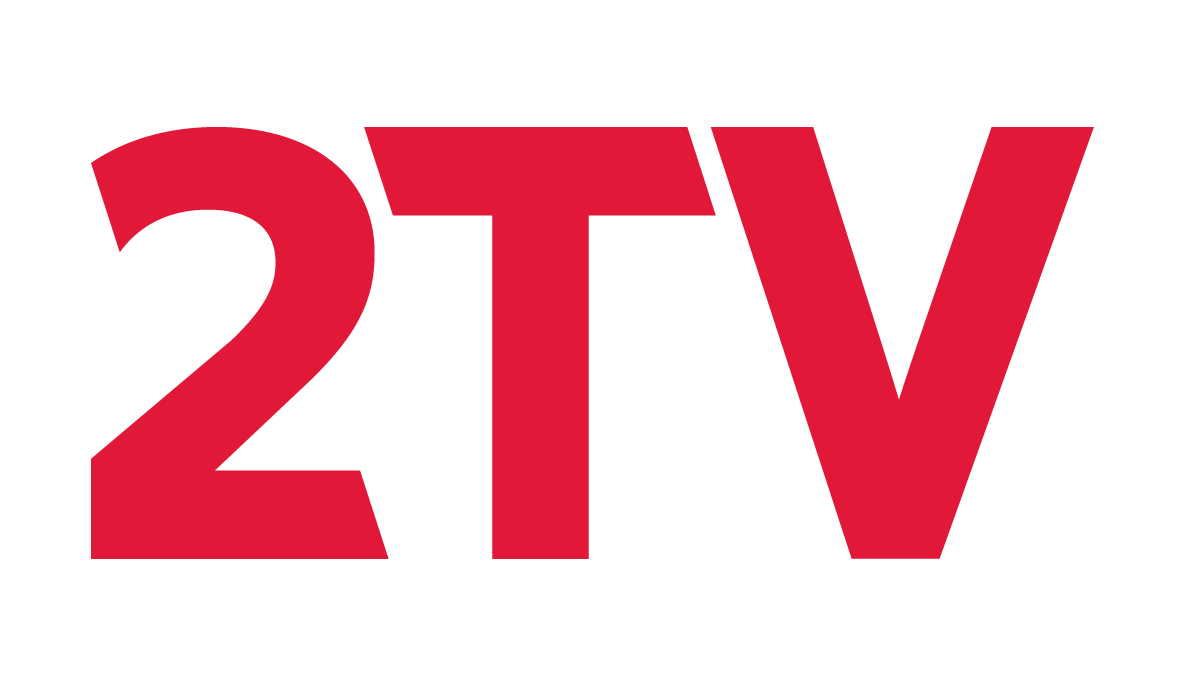
- Country: Lithuania

Ownership
- Owner: Laisvas ir nepriklausomas kanalas, UAB
- Sister channels: LNK; BTV; TV1; Info TV

History
- Launched: November 19, 2007
- Former names: Liuks!

Links
- Webcast: https://lnk.lt/tiesiogiai#2tv

2TV is a Lithuanian television channel owned and operated by LNK. It broadcasts 24 hours a day. It was launched in November 19th, 2007 under the name Liuks! Televizija, and it was the second music channel in Lithuania. It did not get any design changes after 2013, it remained the same, did not have an HD channel like most other channels from LNK do in 2018. in 2020, the name was changed to 2TV.
