= Judita Leitaitė =

Lithuanian opera singer

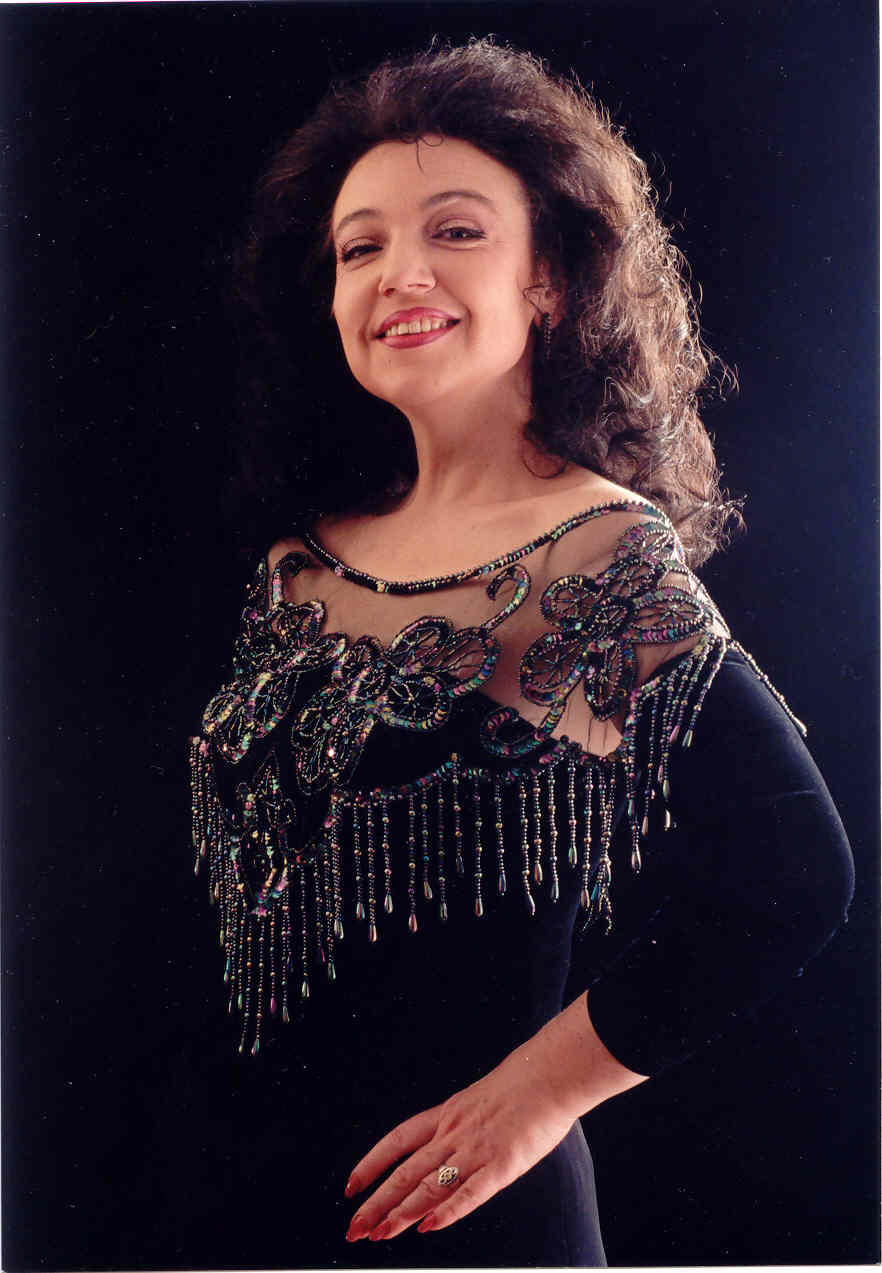

Judita Leitaitė (born 27 December 1959) is a Lithuanian opera singer and mezzo-soprano.

== Biography ==
In 1984 she graduated from Lithuanian Academy of Music and Theatre. In 2008 she participated in the LNK TV show "Žvaigždžių duetai".

In 2004 Judita Leitaitė received the National Lithuanian Order of Vytautas the Great for career merits.

== Discography ==
- Judita Leitaitė. (1996)
- Judita Leitaitė. (1996)
- Mis canciones favoritas escandinavas (1998)
- Le canto al amor. (2003)
- Requiem in memoriam Stasys Lozoraitis (2003)
- Skrendančios De Navidad. (2004)
- Ave Maria.' (2004)
- Gueto banda sonora original. (2006)
- Yo Canto Para Usted. (2006)
- Judita Leitaitė. Sergei Krinicinas. (2006)
- CD de oro de 2007 (2007)
- Yo elijo el amor.. (2007)
- Para Ti, mi Ángel. (2009)
- Юдита Лейтайте. Сергей Мальцев. (2009)
- Сергей Мальцев. Юдита Лейтайте. (2010)
- Sinceramente Suyo. (2010)
- Judita Leitaitė (2014)
