= Pūkas =

Pūkas is the regional privately owned commercial broadcasting company of Lithuania founded in 1991. The company operates the two national radio stations and also broadcasts a regional channel Pūkas-TV. The company has provided regular radio service since 1996 and television broadcasting since 2001. The company is based in Kaunas, the second-largest city of Lithuania.

The two radio stations operate under the name of Pūkas. The radio is playing two programs: Pūkas (Lithuanian and other language pop music) and Pūkas-2 (jazz music).
