= Utena =

Utena may refer to:

== Places ==
- Utena, Lithuania
  - Utena District Municipality
  - Utena County
  - Utena Arena
- Utena Dam, in Ehime Prefecture, Japan
- 202704 Utena, an asteroid

== Fictional characters ==
- Utena Tenjou, principal character in Revolutionary Girl Utena
- Utena Hiiragi, a protagonist from Gushing over Magical Girls manga

== See also ==
- The dictionary definition of うてな at Wiktionary (utena)
- Adolescence of Utena, a 1999 Japanese anime film
