= Lietuvos rytas TV =

- Broadcast area: Lithuania

Programming
- Picture format: HDTV 1080i SDTV 576i

Ownership
- Owner: UAB Singing Fish

History
- Replaced: Penktas kanalas

Links
- Website: www.lietuvosryto.tv/

Lietuvos ryto TV is a Lithuanian entertainment channel founded on 12 October 2008. In 2022, all programs started to be broadcasting in the Lithuanian language, considering the fact that half of the Russian programs that were shown were only with subtitles or the other was dubbed. All Turkish and Ukrainian programs are dubbed. Famous Lithuanian journalist Edmundas Jakilaitis was the first channel manager. In January 2013, he was replaced by Linas Ryškus. 45% of all showing programs are taken from foreign countries, like Russia, Turkey and Ukraine.

Lietuvos Rytas TV replaced Lithuanian Penktas kanalas ("Channel 5", Originally Vilnius TV) which was established in 2004.

Lietuvos Rytas TV was part of Lietuvos rytas Media Group. In 2019, UAB Singing Fish acquired the channel.
