= BTV (Lithuanian TV channel) =

- Country: Lithuania

Ownership
- Owner: Laisvas ir nepriklausomas kanalas, UAB
- Sister channels: LNK; TV1; Info TV; 2TV

History
- Launched: 9 April 1993 (original); 17 September 2004 (relaunch)
- Closed: 30 May 2002 (original)
- Former names: TV4 (2002–2004)

Links
- Webcast: https://lnk.lt/tiesiogiai#btv

BTV is a Lithuanian television station, established in 1993. BTV broadcasts 24 hours a day and has its headquarters in Vilnius. The program includes entertainment, information and educational programs, films and productions. BTV cover 80% of Lithuania's territory.

== History ==
In April 1993, the joint Lithuanian–US company "Baltijos televizija" was established; its main shareholder was the US company "American Equitable Finance Corporation", led by Kęstutis Makaitis, and the Ministry of Finance of the Republic of Lithuania became the smaller shareholder. In the same year, Baltijos Televizija, founded by the company, started broadcasting. This channel in 1994–95 shared the same UHF channel (38) as TV Polonia. It was also rebroadcast on TELE-3. In 1996, the channel began to expand its network of correspondents when the Kupiškis studio was established. In the 1996–98, period it used to rebroadcast BBC and CNN programs for most of its output.

On 30 May 2002, Polsat renamed the channel as TV4, adopting the name and identity of the Polish channel, but two years later, it was relaunched on 17 September 2004.

=== Television ratings ===
BTV is included in Lithuania's official television audience measurement system conducted by Kantar (formerly TNS LT), which has been employing TV meter technology since 2000. The research includes over 1,070 respondents from 4 years of age and provides minute-by-minute TV viewers' audience indexes for major Lithuanian channels, including TV3, LNK, LRT Televizija, BTV, and others.

According to Statista data from 2022, the leading television channels in Lithuania by daily reach were TV3 (approximately 33 percent), LNK and LRT Televizija (both around 31 and 29 percent respectively), with other channels including BTV competing in the remaining market segments. Market analysis firm Dataxis has noted that Lithuanian TV broadcasters, including BTV, have experienced revenue pressures due to adverse conditions in advertising markets following 2020.

== Shows ==
- Betson LKL (Lithuanian)
- Gyvenu čia (Lithuanian)

== News ==
- Info Diena
