= Lietuvos rytas =

Lithuanian daily newspaper

Logo

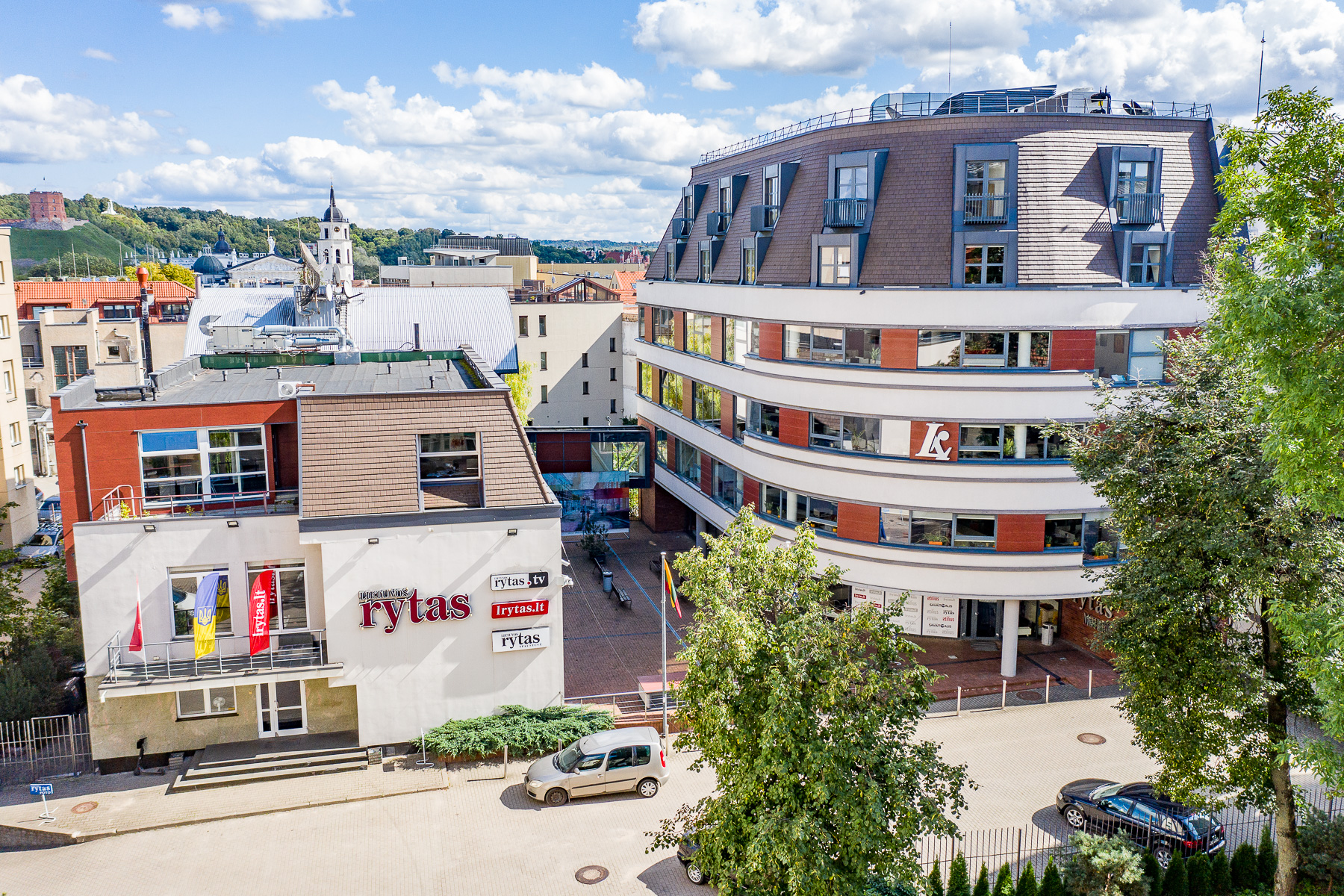
Office in Vilnius

Lietuvos rytas (lit. 'Morning of Lithuania') is a Lithuanian daily newspaper.

== History and profile ==
"Lietuvos rytas" was established in 1990 on a basis of newspaper "Komjaunimo tiesa". The paper is printed in Vilnius on Tuesday, Thursday and Saturday. It has a liberal political leaning. "Lietuvos rytas" is part of "Lietuvos rytas" media group.

Additionally to the daily newspaper come the supplements "Rytai-Vakarai", "Sostinė", "Laikinoji Sostinė", magazines "Stilius", "Savaitgalis" (with "TV Antena") and "Stilius Plius". The online version of the paper was started in 2005.

Its circulation was 55.700 copies in 2021.
