= LNK (Lithuanian TV channel) =

Lithuanian television channel

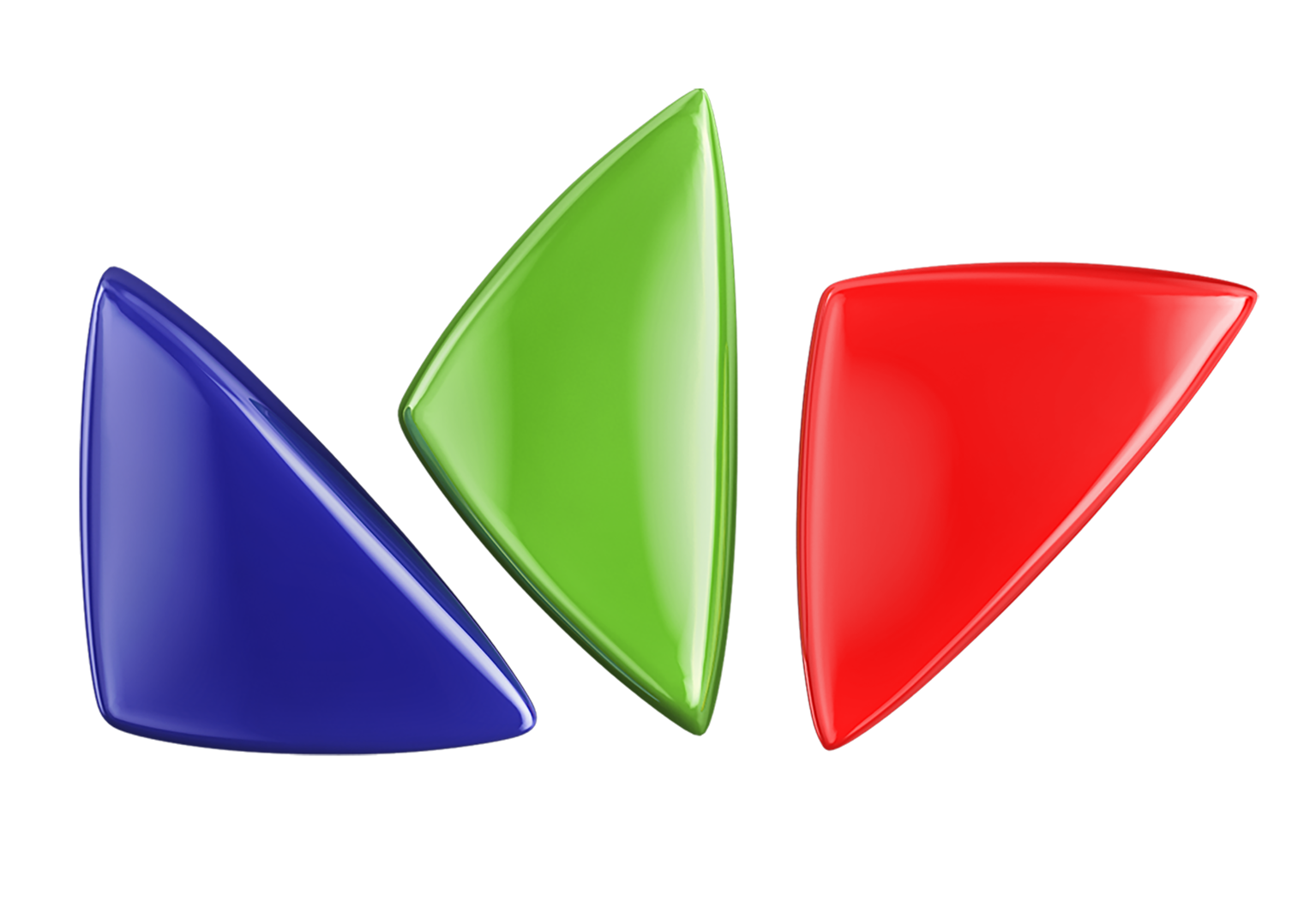
- Country: Lithuania
- Broadcast area: Lithuania
- Headquarters: Šeškinės g. 20, 07156 Vilnius

Programming
- Language: Lithuanian
- Picture format: HDTV 1080i SDTV 576i

Ownership
- Owner: Laisvas ir nepriklausomas kanalas, UAB
- Sister channels: BTV; TV1; Info TV; 2TV

History
- Launched: 5 May 1995

Links
- Webcast: lnk.lt/tiesiogiai
- Website: lnk.lt

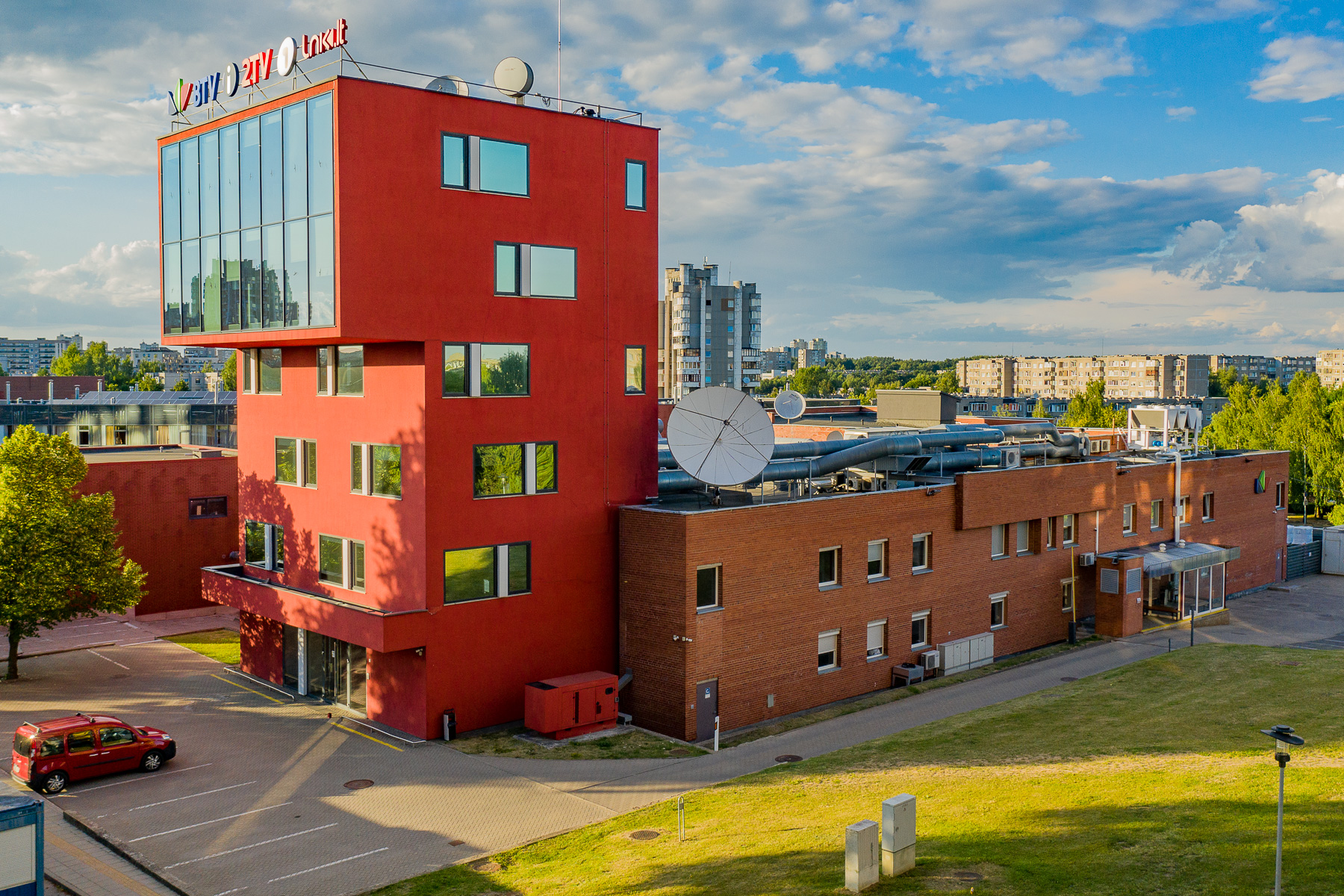
LNK headquarters in Vilnius

LNK (Laisvas ir nepriklausomas kanalas, Free and Independent Channel) is a commercial television channel operating in Lithuania. It is a free-to-air TV channel targeted at a Lithuanian audience and primarily broadcasts local entertainment, dubbed movies, lifestyle shows, and news.

As of 2017, LNK has about one million daily viewers on average.

== History ==
LNK was founded in Lapės after the reorganization of "LitPoliinter TV." On 1 April 1995, the Lithuanian Agricultural Bank became its main shareholder, with other shareholders including "Vilniaus Vingis," "Griaustinio Aidas," and the Lithuanian Workers' Union. The channel was officially launched throughout Lithuania on 5 May 1995. Initially, LNK mainly retransmitted Russian programs from ORT (now Channel One Russia), including its news bulletin Vremya.

In 1996, LNK replaced its previous content with original programming That year, an office was established in Vilnius. In the summer of 1997, several curated shows, such as "Dviračio šou," moved to Baltic Television. In October 1997, British Pacific Media Management purchased the company's shares from "Vilniaus Vingis," the company "Anoma," and the association of depositors affected by "LitPoliinter." In January 1998, Hubertas Grušnys and Clear Channel Communication International acquired 10% of LNK's shares from Aleksandras Ambrazevičius and 46% from British Pacific Media Management. In September of the same year, the Bonnier Group purchased 44% of LNK's shares from the Lithuanian Agricultural Bank and 56% from H. Grušnys. Following this acquisition, several employees from the LNK News Service moved to Baltic Television. In 2000, some of the former employees and shows returned to LNK.

In 2012, LNK switched to digital television. The channel primarily features Lithuanian shows, series, and other programming.

In November 2018, LNK launched a high-definition channel, LNK HD.

The channel ceased broadcasts to Latvia on 14 December 2021, as one of 38 foreign channels deemed "no longer relevant" by the National Electronic Mass Media Council (NEPLP).

== Programming ==
=== Lithuanian programs ===
Entertainment shows:

- Aš matau tavo balsą — local adaptation of I Can See Your Voice
- KK2 and KK2 Penktadienis
- Lietuvos balsas (The Voice of Lithuania)
- Lietuvos balsas. Vaikai. (The Voice of Lithuania. Kids)
- Lietuvos balsas. Senjorai. (The Voice of Lithuania. Senior)
- Šokio revoliucija
- Kaukės (Masked Singer Lithuania)

Lifestyle shows:

- Nuo... iki.
- Bus visko

Talk shows:

- Bučiuoju. Rūta
- VIDO VIDeO

More shows:

- Šeškinės 20 (Comedy Show)
- Gyvūnų Pasaulis (About Animals)
- Teleloto

News programs:

- LNK žinios
- Labas vakaras, Lietuva
- Vidurdienio Žinios

Lithuanian Series:

- Rimti Reikalai (Action series)
- Monikai Reikia Meilės
- Man Reikia Meilės

=== Foreign programs ===
==== Series ====
- Yasak Elma (Turkish series)
- Sen Çal Kapımı (Drama, Love, Comedy, Turkish series)
- Yargı (Drama, Detective, Turkish series)
- Ada Masalı (Drama, Comedy, Turkish series)
- Aşk Laftan Anlamaz (Drama, Comedy, Turkish series)
- Senden Daha Güzel (Drama, Comedy, Turkish series)
- Dos vidas (Drama, Spanish series)
- Die Rosenheim-Cops (Detective, German series)
- Гадалка (телесериал) (Mystery, Drama, Fantasy, Russian series)

==== Reality Shows ====
- The Lady and the Peasant (TV series) (Ukrainian TV series)
- The Farmer Wants a Wife (Australian TV series)

==== Animation ====
- Oggy and the Cockroaches (French animated series)
- Zig & Sharko (French animated series)
- Maya the Bee (TV series) (German-French TV series)
- Tom and Jerry (American animated series)
- Little Einsteins (VO)
- 101 Dalmatians (VO)

== See also ==
- Television in Lithuania
