= Politics of Lithuania =

Politics of Lithuania takes place in a framework of a unitary semi-presidential representative democratic republic, whereby the president of Lithuania is the head of state and the prime minister of Lithuania is the head of government, and of a multi-party system.

Executive power is exercised by the president and the Government, which is headed by the prime minister. Legislative power is vested in both the Government and the unicameral Seimas (Lithuanian Parliament). Judicial power is vested in judges appointed by the president of Lithuania and is independent of executive and legislature power. The judiciary consists of the Constitutional Court, the Supreme Court, and the Court of Appeal as well as the separate administrative courts. The Constitution of the Republic of Lithuania established these powers upon its approval on 25 October 1992. Being a multi-party system, the government of Lithuania is not dominated by any single political party, rather it consists of numerous parties that must work with each other to form coalition governments. The Economist Intelligence Unit rated Lithuania a "flawed democracy" in 2024.

== History ==
Since Lithuania restored independence on 11 March 1990, it has kept democratic traditions. Drawing from the interwar experiences, politicians made many different proposals that ranged from strong parliamentarism to a presidential republic with checks and balances similar to the United States. Through compromise, a semi-presidential system was settled. In a referendum on 25 October 1992, the first general vote of the people since their declared independence, 56.75% of the total number of voters supported the new constitution.

All major political parties declared their support for Lithuania's membership in NATO and the European Union (EU). Lithuania joined NATO on 29 March 2004. Lithuania joined the EU on 1 May 2004 and Schengen Area on 21 December 2007 and Eurozone on 1 January 2015.

Since 1991, Lithuanian voters have shifted from right to left and back again, swinging between the Conservatives, led by Vytautas Landsbergis, and the (formerly Communist) Democratic Labour Party of Lithuania, led by president Algirdas Brazauskas. During this period, the prime minister was Gediminas Vagnorius.

Valdas Adamkus was the president since 1998. His proposed prime minister was Rolandas Paksas, whose government got off to a rocky start and collapsed within seven months. The alternation between left and right was broken in the October 2000 elections when the Liberal Union and New Union parties won the most votes and were able to form a centrist ruling coalition with minor partners. President Adamkus played a key role in bringing the new centrist parties together. Artūras Paulauskas, the leader of the centre-left New Union (also known as the social-liberal party), became the Chairman of the Seimas. In July 2001, the centre-left New Union party forged an alliance with the Social Democratic Party of Lithuania and formed a new cabinet under former president Algirdas Brazauskas. On 11 April 2006, Artūras Paulauskas was removed from his position and Viktoras Muntianas was elected Chairman of the Seimas.

The cabinet of Algirdas Brazauskas resigned on 31 May 2006, as President Valdas Adamkus expressed no confidence in two of the Ministers, formerly party colleagues of Brazauskas, over ethical principles. Brazauskas decided not to remain in office as acting prime minister, and announced that he was finally retiring from politics. Even so, he led the ruling Social Democratic Party of Lithuania for one more year, until 19 May 2007, when he passed the reins to Gediminas Kirkilas. On 27 November 2008, Andrius Kubilius of conservative Homeland Union was appointed as a prime minister. In December 2012 Andrius Kubilius was succeeded by Algirdas Butkevičius after his Social Democratic Party became the biggest party in parliamentary elections.

In 2016, The Peasant and Green's Union (LGPU) won parliamentary elections. It secured 54 seats in the 141-member parliament (Seimas), making a previously small centrist agrarian party the biggest in parliament. The conservative Homeland Union won 30 seats. The ruling Social Democrats, led by Lithuania's Prime Minister Algirdas Butkevciu, lost heavily and secured just 17 seats. On 22 November 2016, Saulius Skvernelis of the Lithuanian Peasants and Greens Union, became new prime minister.

In October 2020, conservative opposition Homeland Union-Lithuanian Christian Democrats (TS-LKD) won parliamentary elections with 50 seats. Prime Minister Saulius Skvernelis' Union of Farmers and Greens came a distant second with just 32 seats. In November 2020, Ingrida Šimonytė became new prime minister, after forming a centre-right coalition government of her TS-LKD and two liberal parties.

== Government ==
Government in Lithuania is made up of three branches originally envisioned by enlightenment philosopher Baron de Montesquieu: executive, legislative, and judicial. Each branch is separate and is set up to do checks and balances on each other branch.

=== Executive branch ===
The executive branch of the Lithuanian government consists of a president, a prime minister, and the president's Council of Ministers. It is in charge of running the government.

==== President ====
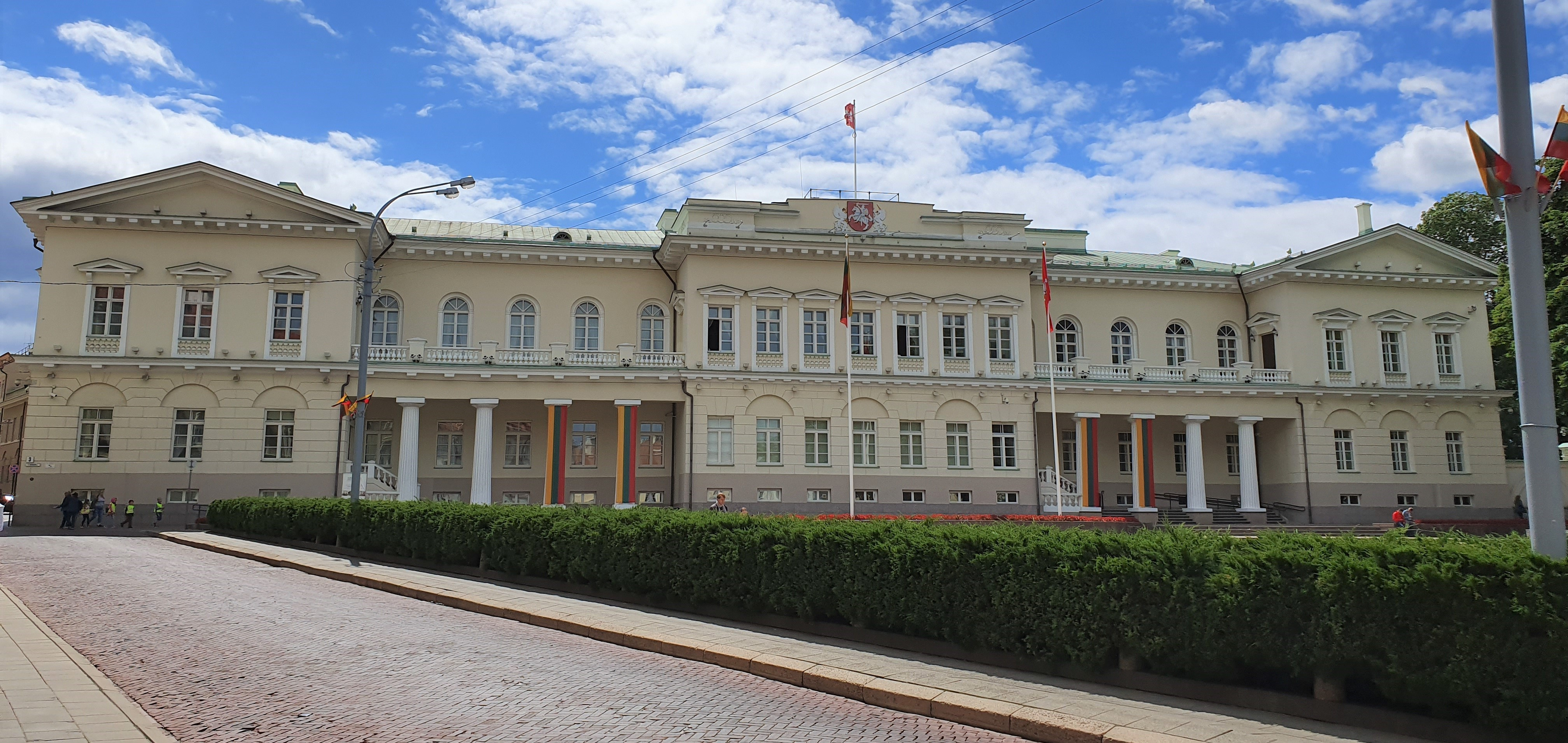
Presidential Palace of the Republic of Lithuania in Daukanto Square

The president of Lithuania is the head of state of the country, elected directly for a five-year term and can serve maximum of two terms consecutively. Presidential elections take place in a modified version of the two-round system. If half of voters participate, a candidate must win a majority of the total valid vote in order to win election in the first round. If fewer than half of voters participate, a candidate can win outright with a plurality and at least one third of the total vote. If the first round does not produce a president, a runoff is held between the top two finishers in the first round, with a plurality sufficient to win.

The president, with the approval of the Seimas, is first responsible of appointing the prime minister. Upon the prime minister's nomination, the president also appoints, under the recommendation of the prime minister, the Council of Ministers (13 ministries), as well as a number of other top civil servants and the judges for all courts. The president also serves as the commander-in-chief, oversees foreign and security policy, addresses political problems of foreign and domestic affairs, proclaims states of emergency, considers the laws adopted by the Seimas, and performs other duties specified in the Constitution. Lithuanian presidents have somewhat greater power than their counterparts in Estonia and Latvia, but have more influence in foreign policy than domestic policy.

Former president Rolandas Paksas, who had defeated Adamkus in 2003, was impeached in April 2004 for leaking classified information.

Dalia Grybauskaitė, the first female president, served as the president of Lithuania since July 2009 until 2019, winning a reelection bid in 2014. Grybauskaitė succeeded Valdas Adamkus who had served a total of two non-consecutive terms.

In 2019, Gitanas Nauseda won Lithuania's presidential runoff election after his opponent Ingrida Šimonytė conceded.

==== Prime minister ====
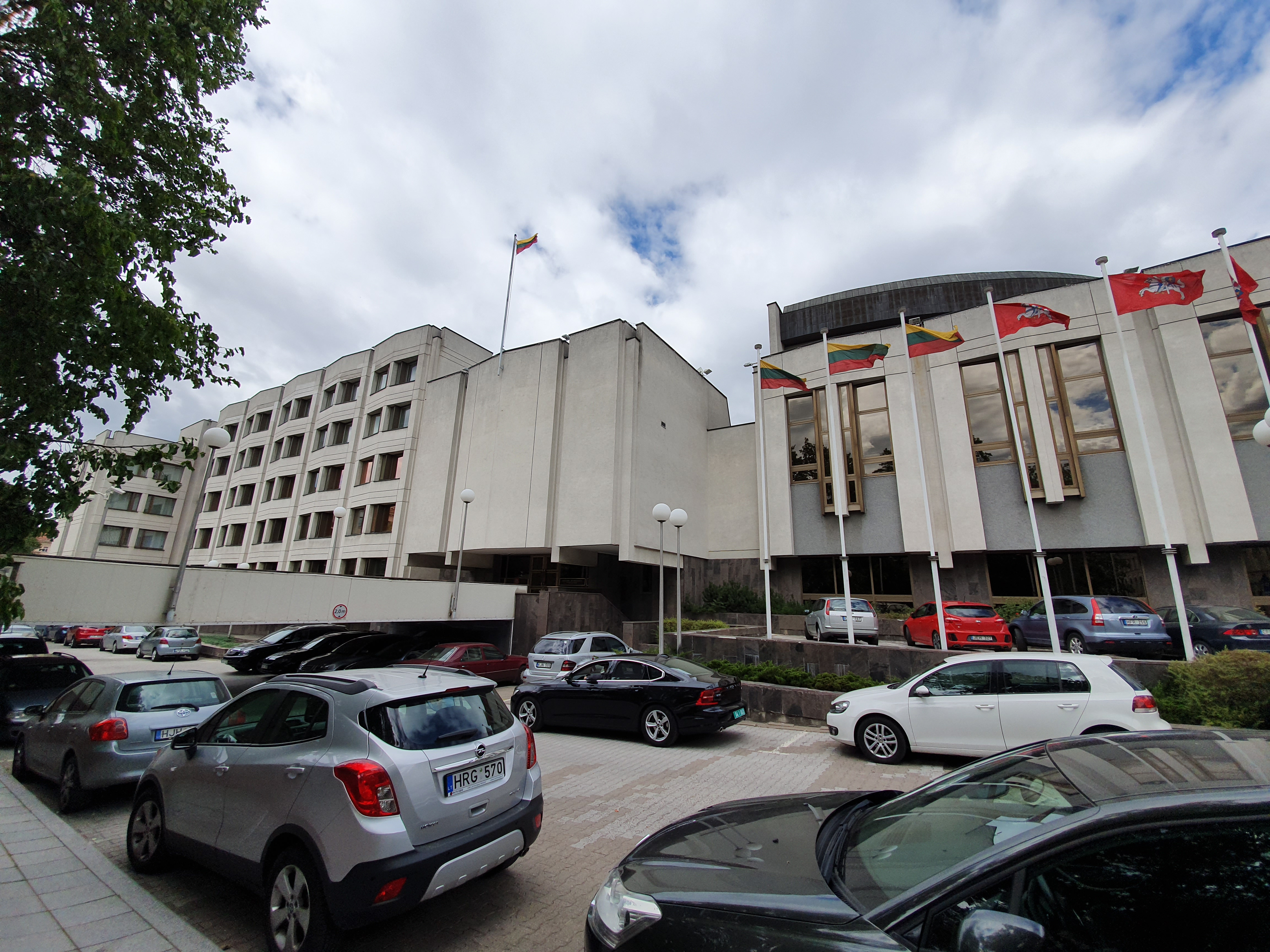
Government of Lithuania building

The prime minister of Lithuania is the head of government of the country, appointed by the president and approved by the Seimas. The prime minister, within 15 days of being appointed, is responsible for choosing ministers for the president to approve to each of the 13 ministries. In general, the prime minister is in charge of the affairs of the country, maintains homeland security, carries out laws and resolutions of the Seimas and decrees of the president, maintains diplomatic relations with foreign countries and international organizations, and performs other duties specified in the Constitution. In practice, the prime minister is mostly responsible for domestic policy, while the president mostly handles foreign policy.

==== Council of Ministers ====
Similar to the cabinet of other nations, the Council of Ministers consists of 14 ministers chosen by the prime minister and appointed by the president. Each minister is responsible for their own ministry of the Lithuanian government and must provide reports when directed. When the prime minister resigns or dies, the position is to be filled as soon as possible and the new leader will appoint a new government.

==== Current office holders ====
Main office-holders
Office	Name	Party	Since
President	Gitanas Nausėda	Independent	12 July 2019
Prime Minister	Mindaugas Sinkevičius	Social Democratic Party of Lithuania	14 July 2026
Seimas Speaker	Juozas Olekas	Social Democratic Party of Lithuania	10 September 2025

=== Legislative branch ===
Seimas Palace in Vilnius

The parliament (Seimas) has 141 members that are elected for a 4-year term. About half of the members are elected in single-member districts (71), and the other half (70) are elected in the nationwide vote using proportional representation by party lists. A party must receive at least 5% of the national vote to be represented in the Seimas. On the first session the Seimas elects the Speaker of the Seimas. The opposition can elect the Leader of the Opposition.

=== Political parties and elections ===
==== 2024 presidential election ====
Presidential elections were held in Lithuania on 12 May 2024, alongside a referendum on allowing multiple citizenships. Incumbent President Gitanas Nausėda won re-election to a second term. When candidate registrations closed before the election, the Lithuanian Central Election Commission had confirmed fifteen viable registrations; of those, twelve proceeded to collect signatures from the minimum 20,000 voters. Four of those contenders were later repudiated or dropped out, leaving eight on the ballot.

A second round was held on 26 May as no candidate received an absolute majority in the first round. This saw Nausėda and Prime Minister Ingrida Šimonytė facing off in the runoff, a rematch of the 2019 election in which Nausėda had defeated Šimonytė. Nausėda won re-election, defeating Šimonytė in a second-round landslide with 75% of the vote – the largest margin of victory in a free election for any presidential candidate in the history of Lithuania.

==== 2024 parliamentary election ====
Parliamentary elections were held in Lithuania on 13 and 27 October 2024 to elect the 141 members of the Seimas. Members were elected in 71 single-member constituencies using the two-round system, and the remaining 70 in a single nationwide constituency using proportional representation. The first round was held on 13 October and the second round on 27 October.

The elections were won by the Social Democratic Party of Lithuania (LSDP), which secured 19.32% of the popular vote and 52 seats, up from 9.58% and 13 seats in the previous elections in 2020. The Homeland Union (TS–LKD), the largest party in the ruling centre-right coalition in the preceding Seimas, finished a distant second, securing 28 seats, down from its previous 50.

Following the first round of the election, the Social Democrats entered into coalition talks with the Lithuanian Farmers and Greens Union (LVŽS) and the Union of Democrats "For Lithuania" (DSVL), which had split from the latter. After the second round, the consultations were expanded to include the Liberals' Movement (LS), which had been part of the outgoing conservative-led coalition, and Dawn of Nemunas (PPNA), a new nationalist party that finished in third place overall.

The LSDP eventually reached a deal with DSVL and PPNA to form a coalition government. The Social Democrats' decision to include the Dawn of Nemunas party, whose founder is known for making controversial statements, prompted domestic and international backlash.

==== 2024 European election ====
The 2024 European Parliament election in Lithuania were held on 9 June 2024 as part of the 2024 European Parliament election. This was the first to take place after Brexit.

=== Judicial branch ===
The judges of the Constitutional Court of the Republic of Lithuania (Lietuvos Respublikos Konstitucinis Teismas) for a single nine-year term are appointed by the Seimas from the candidates presented by the President (three judges), Chairman of Seimas (three judges) and the chairman of the Supreme Court (three judges).

== Administrative divisions ==
Lithuania has a three-tier administrative division: the country is divided into 10 counties (Lithuanian: singular – apskritis, plural – apskritys) that are further subdivided into 60 municipalities (Lithuanian: singular – savivaldybė, plural – savivaldybės) which consist of over 500 elderships (Lithuanian: singular – seniūnija, plural – seniūnijos).

The county governors (Lithuanian: apskrities viršininkas) institution and county administrations have been dissolved in 2010.

Municipalities are the most important administrative unit. Some municipalities are historically called "district municipalities", and thus are often shortened to "district"; others are called "city municipalities", sometimes shortened to "city". Each municipality has its own elected government. In the past, the election of municipality councils occurred once every three years, but it now takes place every four years. The council appoints elders to govern the elderships. Mayors are elected directly since 2015, being appointed by the council before that.

== International organization participation ==
Organization	Acronym	Date joined	Notes
Bank for International Settlements	BIS	31 March 1931	
Council of the Baltic Sea States	CBSS	5 March 1992	
Council of Europe	COE	14 May 1993	
Euro-Atlantic Partnership Council	EAPC		
European Bank for Reconstruction and Development	EBRD	30 January 1992	
United Nations Economic Commission for Europe	ECE		
European Space Agency	ESA	21 May 2021	Associate state.
European Union	EU	1 May 2004	
Food and Agriculture Organization	FAO	9 November 1991	
International Atomic Energy Agency	IAEA	18 November 1993	
World Bank	IBRD	6 July 1992	
International Civil Aviation Organization	ICAO	27 September 1991	
International Chamber of Commerce	ICC		
International Criminal Court	ICC		
International Trade Union Confederation	ITUC		
International Finance Corporation	IFC	21 March 1992	
International Red Cross and Red Crescent Movement	IFRCS	17 November 1991	
International Labour Organization	ILO	4 October 1991	
International Monetary Fund	IMF	29 March 1992	
International Maritime Organization	IMO	7 December 1995	
International Criminal Police Organization – Interpol	Interpol	4 November 1991	
International Olympic Committee	IOC		First participation in 1924.
International Organization for Migration	IOM	28 November 1995	
International Organization for Standardization	ISO	1 January 1992	
International Telecommunication Union	ITU	12 October 1991	
North Atlantic Treaty Organization	NATO	1 April 2004	
Nordic Investment Bank	NIB	1 January 2005	
Organisation for the Prohibition of Chemical Weapons	OPCW	15 May 1998	
Organisation for Economic Co-operation and Development	OECD	5 July 2018	
Organization for Security and Co-operation in Europe	OSCE	10 September 1991	
United Nations	UN	17 September 1991	
United Nations Educational, Scientific and Cultural Organization	UNESCO	15 October 1991	
United Nations Children's Fund	UNICEF	6 February 1993	
United Nations Mission in Bosnia and Herzegovina	UNMIBH		
United Nations Mission in Kosovo	UNMIK		
Universal Postal Union	UPU	10 January 1992	
World Customs Organization	WCO	18 June 1992	
World Health Organization	WHO	25 November 1991	
World Intellectual Property Organization	WIPO	30 March 1992	
World Meteorological Organization	WMO	3 July 1922	
World Trade Organization	WTO	31 May 2001	
