= Impeachment of Rolandas Paksas =

Impeachment proceedings in Lithuania

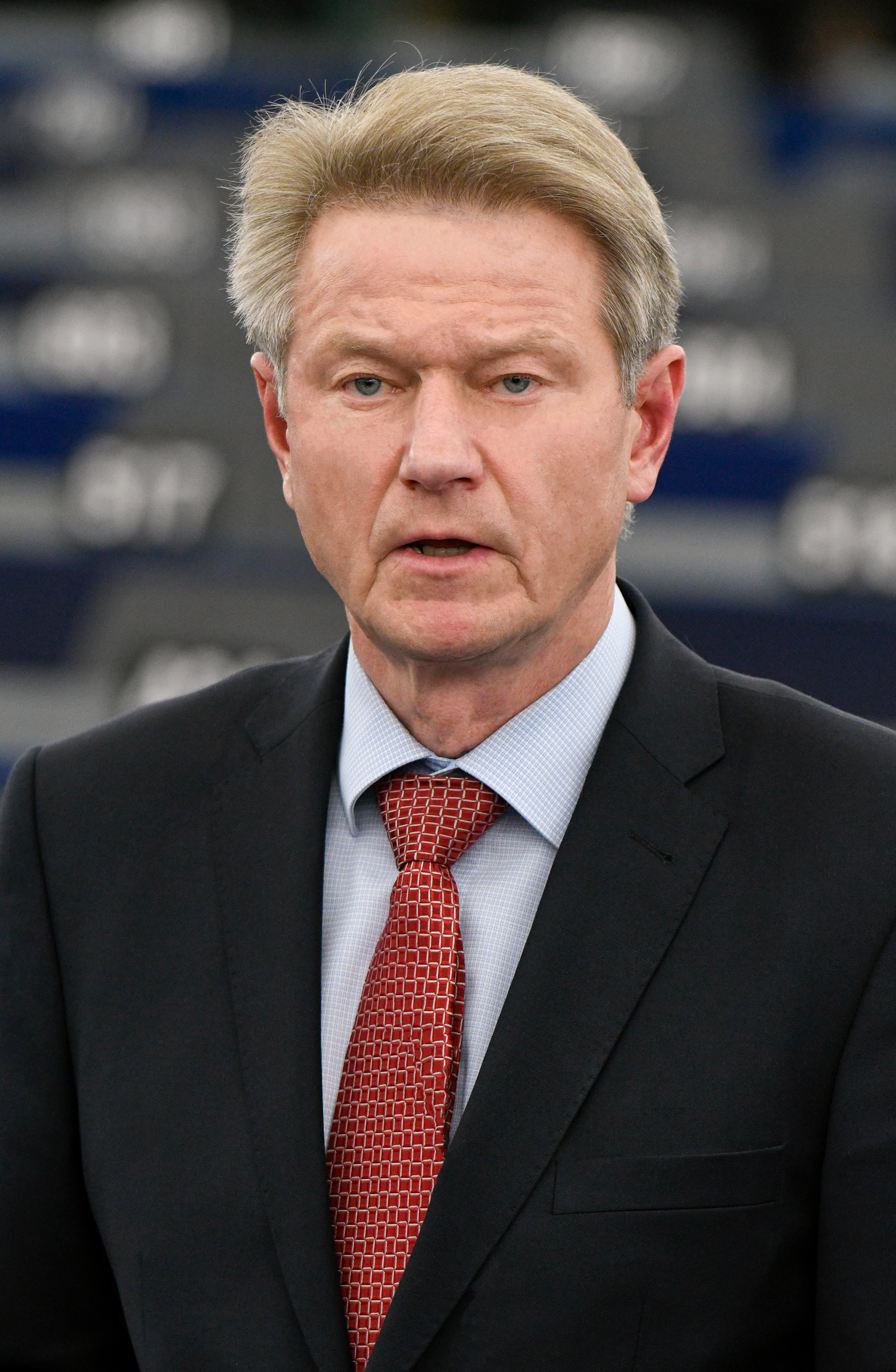
- Accused: Rolandas Paksas; President of Lithuania
- Date: 23 December 2003 – 6 April 2004
- Outcome: Found guilty by the Constitutional Court of Lithuania; Removed from office
- Charges: Interfering in a privatization transaction; Leaking classified information; Improperly restoring Borisov's citizenship

Voting in the Seimas

Vote to open impeachment process
- Votes in favor: 94 / 141 (66.67%)
- Votes against: 11 / 141 (7.8%)
- Not voting: 10 / 141 (7.09%)
- Result: Paksas suspended from office; Artūras Paulauskas appointed as acting president; Constitutional Court rules that Paksas's actions were incompatible with his duties as president, making him guilty of violating the Constitution

Vote to remove Paskas from office
- Votes in favor: 89 / 135 (65.93%)
- Votes against: 41 / 135 (30.37%)
- Not voting: 5 / 135 (3.7%)
- Result: Approved, early election triggered
- Paksas was permanently banned from holding any future public office.

On 23 December 2003, the Seimas voted to initiate impeachment proceedings against President Rolandas Paksas. This action was taken following allegations of serious constitutional violations, including granting Lithuanian citizenship to a major campaign donor, Yuri Borisov, under questionable circumstances, leaking state secrets, and interfering in private business matters.

The case was referred to the Constitutional Court of Lithuania, which ruled on 31 March 2004 that Paksas had violated the Constitution and his oath of office. Following this decision, the Seimas convened on 6 April 2004 to vote on Paksas's removal, achieving the required three-fifths majority to impeach him, making Paksas the first European head of state to be removed via impeachment.

During the impeachment proceedings, the role of acting president was assumed by the Speaker of the Seimas, Artūras Paulauskas, pending the election of a new president.

== History ==
In the second round of the 2002 presidential elections in the Republic of Lithuania, Paksas narrowly defeated the incumbent Valdas Adamkus and began his term as president on 26 February 2003. The scandal began on 30 October, eight months into his presidency, when the head of the State Security Department at the time, Mečys Laurinkus, presented a report to the General Prosecutor's Office, claiming that the president was dependent on international criminals and posed a threat to Lithuania's national security. This claim was later rejected by the Constitutional Court.
