= 2004 Lithuanian presidential election =

← 2002–03	13 June 2004 (first round); 27 June 2004 (second round)	2009 →
- Turnout: 48.40% (first round); 52.46% (second round)
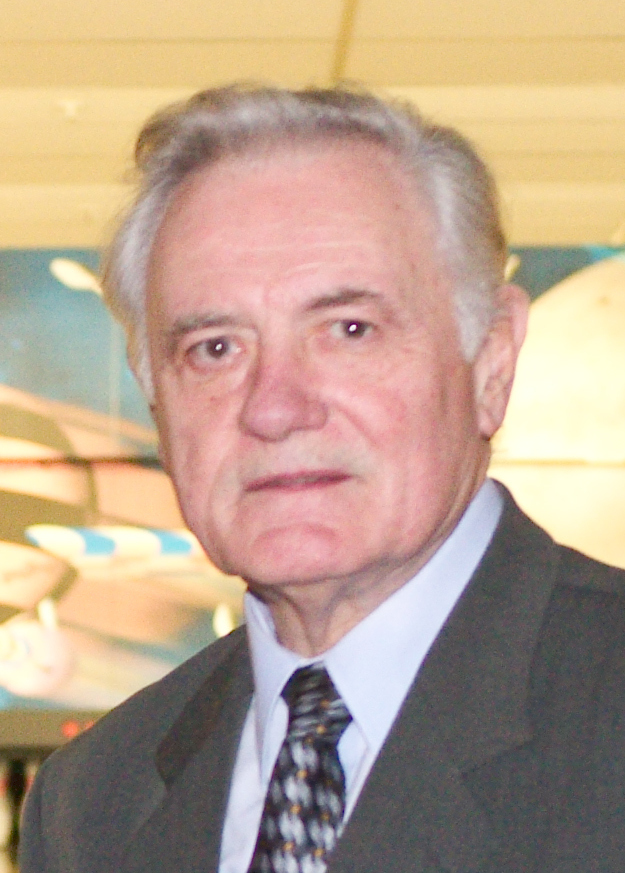

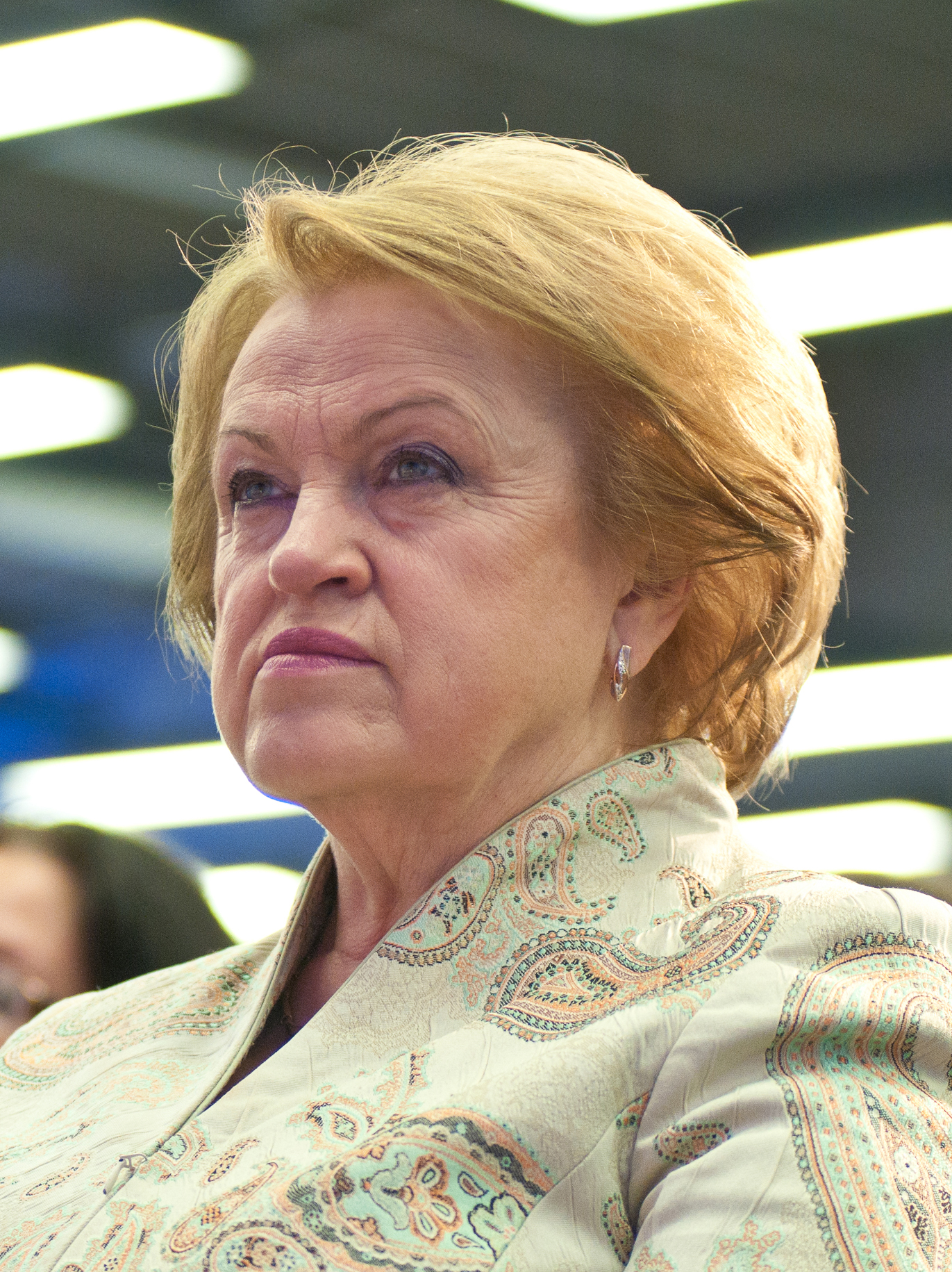
Nominee	Valdas Adamkus	Kazimira Prunskienė
Party	Independent	VNDS
Popular vote	723,891	651,024
Percentage	52.65%	47.35%
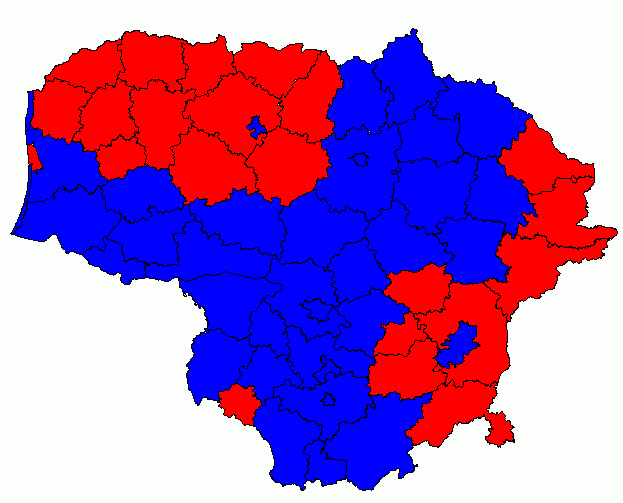
- Second round results by municipality Prunskienė Adamkus
President before election
Artūras Paulauskas (acting)
New Union
Elected President
Valdas Adamkus
Independent

Presidential elections were held in Lithuania in June 2004 alongside European elections. They were held following the impeachment of President Rolandas Paksas, who was elected in January 2003.

== Background ==
Paksas was impeached for allegedly leaking classified material, and granting citizenship to Russian businessman Jurij Borisov in exchange for financial support. The Constitutional Court of Lithuania ruled that Paksas could not seek re-election as president. In accordance with the constitution, the speaker of parliament, Artūras Paulauskas, became acting president pending new elections.

== Candidates ==
The candidates for the presidency were Adamkus, who had been President from 1998 to 2003 and who was running as an independent, Prunskienė of the Peasants and New Democratic Party Union (VNDS), Vilija Blinkevičiūtė of the New Union (Social Liberals) (NS), Petras Auštrevičius (independent), and Česlovas Juršėnas of the Social Democratic Party (LSDP).

Prunskienė was also supported by the Liberal Democratic Party, while Auštrevičius was supported by the Homeland Union, Lithuanian Christian Democrats, Liberal and Centre Union and Labour Party.

== Results ==
In the first round on 13 June former president Valdas Adamkus led the vote tally over the former Prime Minister Kazimira Prunskienė. Adamkus defeated Prunskienė in the second round on 27 June.

Candidate	Party	First round		Second round	
Candidate	Party	Votes	%	Votes	%
Valdas Adamkus	Independent	387,837	31.14	723,891	52.65
Kazimiera Prunskienė	Peasants and New Democratic Party Union	264,681	21.25	651,024	47.35
Petras Auštrevičius	Independent	240,413	19.30		
Vilija Blinkevičiūtė	New Union (Social Liberals)	204,819	16.45		
Česlovas Juršėnas	Social Democratic Party	147,610	11.85		
Total		1,245,360	100.00	1,374,915	100.00
Valid votes		1,245,360	96.91	1,374,915	98.55
Invalid/blank votes		39,707	3.09	20,188	1.45
Total votes		1,285,067	100.00	1,395,103	100.00
Registered voters/turnout		2,655,309	48.40	2,659,211	52.46
Source: Central Election Committee, Central Election Committee
