= 1997–98 Lithuanian presidential election =

- 21 December 1997 (first round); 4 January 1998 (second round)
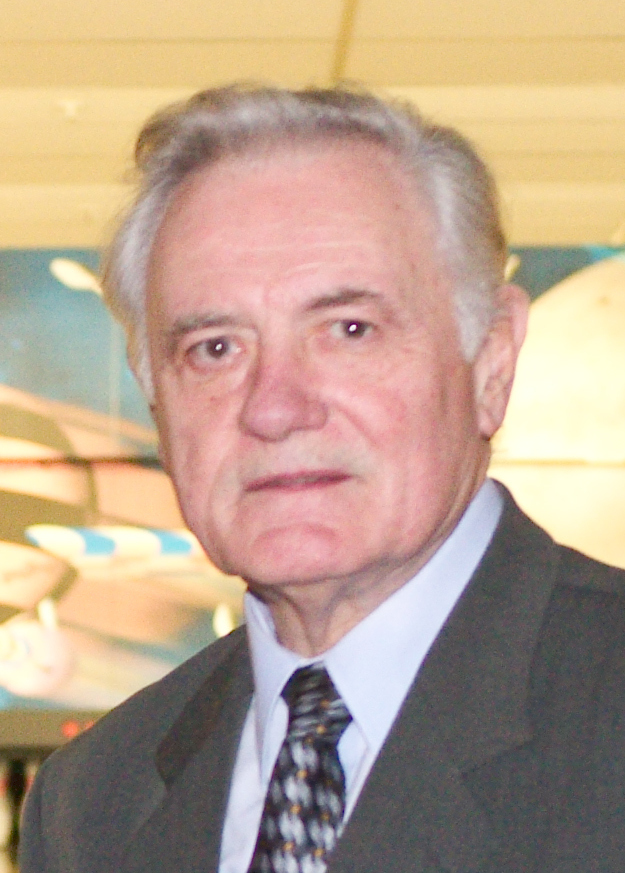

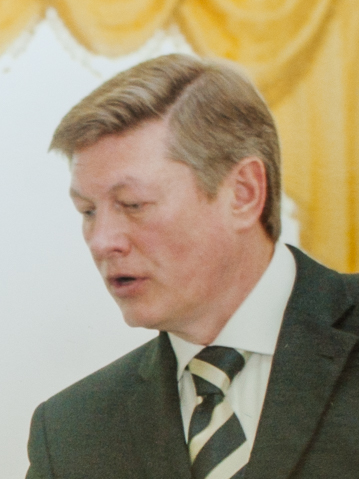
Nominee	Valdas Adamkus	Artūras Paulauskas
Party	Independent	Independent
Popular vote	968,031	953,775
Percentage	50.37%	49.63%
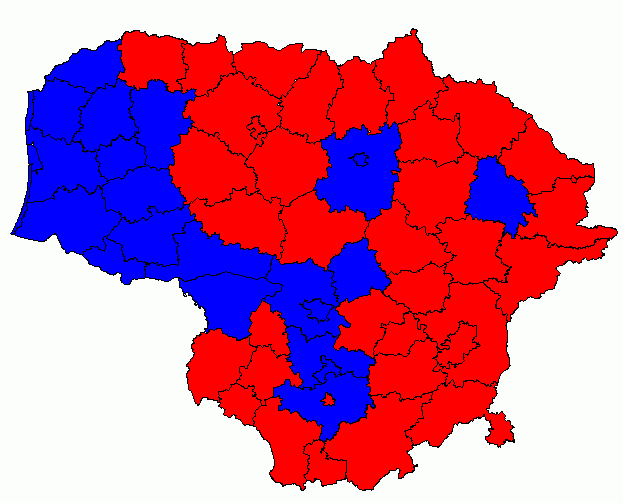
- Second round results by municipality Paulauskas Adamkus
President before election
Algirdas Brazauskas
LDDP
Elected President
Valdas Adamkus
Independent

Presidential elections were held in Lithuania in December 1997 and January 1998. Artūras Paulauskas finished first in the first round on 21 December 1997 with a significant margin, with Valdas Adamkus finishing second, but neither received a majority of the vote. Adamkus defeated Paulauskas in the runoff, held on 4 January 1998. With a vote difference of 0.74%, it is the closest result in the history of presidential elections in Lithuania since 1993.

== Background ==
=== Presidential powers ===
The Lithuanian president has somewhat more executive authority than their counterparts in neighboring Estonia and Latvia; the Lithuanian president's function is similar to that of the presidents of France and Romania. Similarly to them, but unlike presidents in a fully presidential system such as the United States, the Lithuanian president generally has the most authority in foreign affairs. In addition to the customary diplomatic powers of Heads of State, namely receiving the letters of credence of foreign ambassadors and signing treaties, the president determines Lithuania's basic foreign policy guidelines. The president is also the commander-in-chief of the Lithuanian Armed Forces, and accordingly heads the State Defense Council and has the right to appoint the Chief of Defence (subject to Seimas consent).

The president also has a significant role in domestic policy, possessing the right to submit bills to the Seimas and to veto laws passed by it, appointing the prime minister and approving the government formed by them, and also having the right to dissolve the Seimas and call snap elections following a successful motion of no confidence or if the Seimas refuses to approve the government's budget within sixty days. However, the next elected Seimas may retaliate by calling for an earlier presidential election. In addition, according to a resolution by the Constitutional Court of Lithuania in 1998, the president is required by law to nominate the candidate of the parliamentary majority to the office of prime minister.

The president also holds informal power, as the office of president is generally more trusted by the populace according to approval polling, and Lithuanian presidents historically blocked legislation and forced the resignation of prime ministers (such as Gediminas Vagnorius in 1998).

=== Previous election ===
The previous election was held in 1993. The winner of the election was acting president Algirdas Brazauskas, the former first secretary of the Communist Party of Lithuania and leader of the Democratic Labour Party of Lithuania (LDDP). He defeated Stasys Lozoraitis Jr., an independent candidate endorsed by the anti-communist Sąjūdis and other political parties.

== Electoral system ==
The president was elected using the two-round system. To win in the first round, a candidate requires an absolute majority of all votes cast (including invalid votes) and either voter turnout to be above 50% or for their vote share to be equivalent to at least one-third of the number of registered voters. If no candidate wins in the first round, a second round is required, featuring the top two candidates. While some candidates belong to and/or are supported by a political party, the office of the president is formally non-partisan.

Citizens of Lithuania at least 40 years of age whose at least one parent was also a citizen (natural-born-citizen clause), who have lived in Lithuania for at least three years prior, are not serving a prison sentence, are not on active duty in the Lithuanian Armed Forces, are not bound to any other country by an oath and have never been impeached, are allowed to run for president. Each candidate must collect at least 20 thousand signatures by Lithuanian citizens to be able to run for election.

== Candidates ==
Seven candidates were registered in the election. Three more individuals - Algirdas Pilvelis, chairman of the Lithuanian Reform Party, Jurij Subotin and Liucija Baškauskaitė - attempted to register for the election. Three of the candidates belonged to political parties and four of the candidates were independents.

=== Valdas Adamkus ===
Adamkus was a civil engineer and Lithuanian diaspora political activist who lived in the United States as a displaced person from 1949 to 1997. He joined the United States Environmental Protection Agency at its inception in 1970 and served as regional administrator of the Great Lakes region from 1981 to 1997. He frequently visited Lithuania both before and after Soviet occupation as an expert on pollution and waste control. As a close friend of fellow émigré Stasys Lozoraitis Jr., Adamkus was invited to be the chief of staff of his electoral campaign during the 1993 presidential election.

After the election, Adamkus was proposed as a potential candidate in the next presidential election, but he refused to confirm said rumors until March 1997. Adamkus was supported by the Lithuanian Centre Union, whom he also supported in the 1996 Lithuanian parliamentary election.

=== Artūras Paulauskas ===
Paulauskas was the former Prosecutor General of Lithuania and an independent candidate. Though he was a former member of the Communist Party, he was considered a "new generation" politician. Paulauskas's popularity rose during his time as Prosecutor General, during which he upheld the court ruling for a death sentence for crime boss Boris Dekanidze and was involved in other high profile cases.

Paulauskas was supported by the Liberal Union of Lithuania and Democratic Labour Party of Lithuania.

=== Vytautas Landsbergis ===
Landsbergis was the incumbent Speaker of the Seimas and chairman of the Homeland Union, which won the 1996 Lithuanian parliamentary election and formed the government. Paulauskas considered him to be his likely opponent in the second round, but his personal unpopularity meant that he trailed behind both of the leading candidates by a significant margin.

Landsbergis had the largest campaign fund of all candidates, at 2.4 million litas (over 700 thousand EUR).

=== Other candidates ===
The Social Democratic Party of Lithuania nominated Vytenis Andriukaitis as their presidential candidate, while the Lithuanian Christian Democratic Party nominated Kazys Bobelis. The election was also contested by Rimantas Smetona, the former chairman of the Lithuanian Nationalist Union and grand-nephew of the interwar dictator of Lithuania Antanas Smetona, and Rolandas Pavilionis, rector of Vilnius University. Smetona was the only candidate who relied on eurosceptic rhetoric, while Pavilionis focused on the rights of women and minorities.

== Campaign ==
The main contenders were Adamkus, Paulauskas and Landsbergis. According to a Baltijos tyrimai poll in July 1997, 32.7% of the voters intended to vote for Adamkus, 17.6% planned to vote for Paulauskas, and 7.9% planned to vote for Landsbergis. 23.6% of the respondents supported incumbent president Algirdas Brazauskas, who announced that he would not seek reelection and endorsed Paulauskas.

Adamkus, who had lived in the US from 1949 to 1997, faced a legal battle in the Lithuanian courts. Doubts arose whether he was eligible to run for the presidency due to having spent over half a century abroad, raising the possibility that he might not meet minimum residency requirements. However, the court resolved the case in Adamkus' favor and no other obstacles remained other than his American citizenship, which he officially renounced at the American embassy in Vilnius.

Paulauskas' election slogan was "We Deserve to Live Better" (Lithuanian: "Nusipelnėme gyventi geriau"). He presented himself as a law and order candidate and emphasized his fight against organized crime. In media, he was compared to Ronald Reagan. Adamkus focused on his experience as a civil servant in the United States, and emphasized liberal values. Paulauskas was generally supported by rural voters, who were negatively affected by the post-communist transition, while Adamkus was supported more by voters in large cities.

Paulauskas was seen as a favorite in the run-off, but his campaign chose to turn the campaign more aggressive, such as organizing demonstrations calling for "Jankiai (Yankees) go home!". The election was noted for irregularities and violent incidents - Adamkus's chief of staff Raimundas Mieželis was beaten by hooligans prior to the first round, Paulauskas claimed that he was followed by secret service who answered to Landsbergis, and the narrow result in the second round raised allegations of electoral fraud.

== Results ==
In the first round Artūras Paulauskas won in all municipalities except Kaunas and Klaipėda, which were won by Adamkus. Vytautas Landsbergis finished first among voters in foreign embassies and representations, with 41.9 per cent of the votes cast.

After the first round Vytautas Landsbergis endorsed Valdas Adamkus.

In the second round votes for Artūras Paulauskas and Valdas Adamkus were cast almost equally. Valdas Adamkus won in all districts' municipalities in the Klaipėda County and along Nemunas River up until Alytus. Adamkus also received the most votes in Šiauliai, Panevėžys, Panevėžys, Jonava and Utena districts' municipalities. Artūras Paulauskas won in the remaining districts' municipalities, including Alytus and Vilnius.

Candidate	Party	First round		Second round	
Candidate	Party	Votes	%	Votes	%
Artūras Paulauskas	Independent	838,819	45.28	953,775	49.63
Valdas Adamkus	Independent	516,798	27.90	968,031	50.37
Vytautas Landsbergis	Homeland Union – Lithuanian Conservatives	294,881	15.92		
Vytenis Andriukaitis	Social Democratic Party	105,916	5.72		
Kazys Bobelis	Lithuanian Christian Democratic Party	73,287	3.96		
Rolandas Pavilionis	Independent	16,070	0.87		
Rimantas Smetona	Independent	6,697	0.36		
Total		1,852,468	100.00	1,921,806	100.00
Valid votes		1,852,468	98.79	1,921,806	99.18
Invalid/blank votes		22,680	1.21	15,980	0.82
Total votes		1,875,148	100.00	1,937,786	100.00
Registered voters/turnout		2,624,312	71.45	2,630,681	73.66
Source: Nohlen & Stöver

== Aftermath ==
After the election, in April 1998, Artūras Paulauskas and his campaign team formed a political party, the New Union (Social Liberals). This party received the second largest share of the vote in the 2000 parliamentary election, after the social democratic coalition led by Algirdas Brazauskas and the Democratic Labour Party of Lithuania.
