= Rytis Mykolas Račkauskas =

Former Mayor of Panevėžys

Mayor of Panevėžys
- In office 22 April 2015 – 24 October 2024
- President: Dalia Grybauskaitė; Gitanas Nausėda
- Preceded by: Vitalijus Satkevičius
- Succeeded by: Petras Luomanas (Acting)

Member of the Panevėžys City Municipality Council
- In office 2015–2023
- President: Dalia Grybauskaitė; Gitanas Nausėda
- In office 1990–1997
- President: Algirdas Brazauskas

Leader of the political committee "For a Renewed Panevėžys"
- Incumbent
- Assumed office 23 November 2022
- Preceded by: Position established

Personal details
- Born: 25 September 1959 (age 65); Kaunas, Lithuania
- Political party: Political committee "For a Renewed Panevėžys"
- Spouse: Jūratė
- Children: Giedrius, Ignas
- Education: Architect
- Alma mater: Vilnius Gediminas Technical University
- Occupation: Politician

Rytis Mykolas Račkauskas (Lithuanian: [/ˈrɪtɪs ˈmɪkɔlɐs ˈraʧkaʊskɐs/]; born 25 September 1959) is a Lithuanian politician and the former Mayor of Panevėžys, a position he held from 2015 until 2024, when he was removed from office following allegations of abuse in organizing public procurement.

== Education ==
He graduated from Panevėžys Juozas Balčikonis Secondary School in 1977 and from the Vilnius Engineering Construction Institute in 1982, where he obtained a degree in architecture.

== Political career ==
He was a member of the Homeland Union (TS-LKD) from 1993 to 1996 and one of the founders of the party. He served as a member of the Panevėžys City Council from 1990 to 1997 and again from 2015 to 2023. He was the Mayor of Panevėžys from 2015 to 2024.

== Controversies ==
In 2024, Račkauskas was removed from office after being involved in corruption-related issues. He was accused of accepting a bribe in exchange for financial support from the city to a local basketball club. This led to his suspension and the initiation of an investigation into his actions. Račkauskas was also accused of abuse in organizing public procurement processes while serving as mayor, which was one of the reasons behind his removal from office. These allegations further damaged his reputation and led to questions about his leadership during his term.
