= Loreta Masiliūnienė =

Mayor of Panevėžys

Mayor of Panevėžys
- Incumbent
- Assumed office 14 April 2025
- President: Gitanas Nausėda
- Preceded by: Petras Luomanas (Acting); Rytis Mykolas Račkauskas

Vice Mayor of Panevėžys
- In office 2023 – 28 October 2024
- President: Gitanas Nausėda
- Prime Minister: Ingrida Šimonytė

Advisor to the Mayor
- In office 28 October 2024 – 14 April 2025
- President: Gitanas Nausėda
- Prime Minister: Ingrida Šimonytė; Gintautas Paluckas

Personal details
- Born: 2 February 1963 (age 63) Panevėžys, Lithuania
- Education: Vilnius University Šiauliai Academy

Loreta Masiliūnienė (Lithuanian: [lɔˈrɛtɑ mɐsɪˈlʲuːnʲɛnʲe]; born 2 February 1963) is a Lithuanian politician, former teacher and methodologist, who has been serving as the Mayor of Panevėžys since 2025 after winning a landslide victory in the 2025 Panevėžys City mayoral election.

== Education ==
She graduated from the Lithuanian State Institute of Physical Education in 1987, then attended Šiauliai University, graduating in 2008, and later in 2010.

== Work experience ==
Throughout most of her career, she worked as a teacher, later becoming the Deputy Director for Education and a career specialist.

== Languages ==
In addition to Lithuanian, she is also fluent in Russian and English.

== See also ==
- Panevėžys
