= Vitalijus =

- Gender: Male
- Language: Lithuanian

Origin
- Region of origin: Lithuania

Vitalijus is a Lithuanian masculine given name.

People bearing the name Vitalijus include:

- Vitalijus Karpačiauskas (born 1966), Lithuanian boxer
- Vitalijus Kavaliauskas (born 1983), Lithuanian footballer
- Vitalijus Rumiancevas (born 1985), Lithuanian alpine skier
- Vitalijus Satkevičius (born 1961), Lithuanian politician
