= Vilnius Conference 2006 =

Crypt

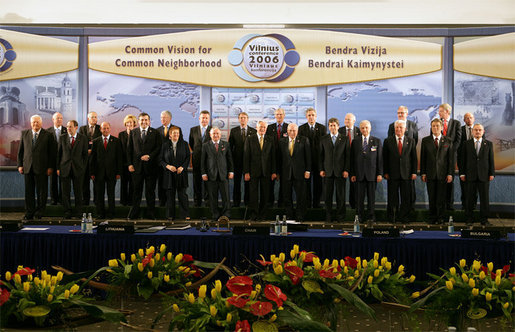
Family photo of the heads of delegations at Vilnius Conference 2006

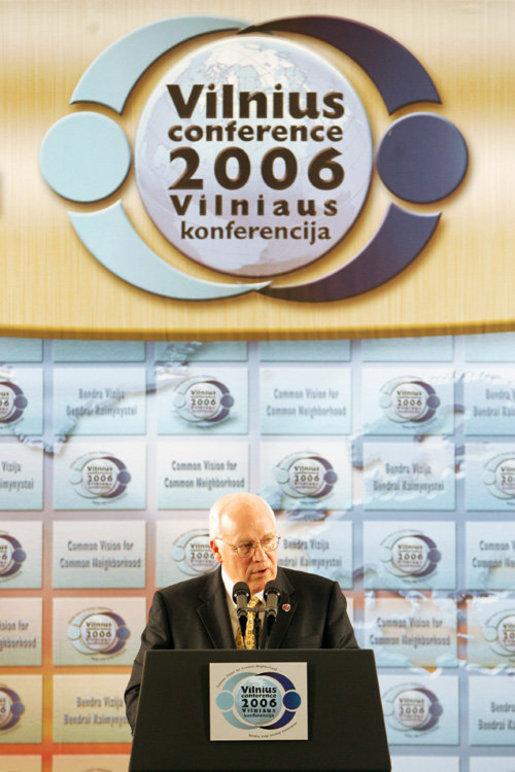
Vice President Dick Cheney delivers speech at the Vilnius Conference 2006

Vilnius Conference 2006: Common Vision for Common Neighborhood brought together delegations from the Baltic and Black Sea regions to discuss common interests and reinforce their commitments to the advancement of democracy and common values in their respective regions. The Conference took place in Vilnius, the capital of Lithuania, and was hosted by the President of Lithuania, Valdas Adamkus.

== Proceedings ==
Vilnius Conference 2006 included Youth, Non-government organizations, and Intellectuals forums. The Conference was opened by a Youth forum on May 1, 2006. Forum participants discussed cooperation in the Euro-Atlantic areas, the New Democracies success stories, the European Union's role in spreading the values of democracy, and other issues. Advancement of democracy in Europe’s east regions, European values and other topics were discussed in the Intellectual's forum. Spread of democracy and its benefits dominated the Non-government organizations forum. Andrei Illarionov, the former adviser to the President of the Russian Federation, delivered a speech dealing with the current situation in Russia.

The final phase of the Vilnius Conference 2006 was the Heads of State Summit attended by the Presidents of Lithuania, Georgia, Ukraine, Estonia, Latvia, Poland, Moldova, Bulgaria, and Romania. The European Union was represented by Javier Solana. One of the Belarusian opposition leaders, Alaksandar Milinkievič, was also invited to participate in the Vilnius Conference, but he was arrested in Belarus prior to the Conference.

During the Heads of State Summit, the Vice-president of the United States, Dick Cheney, delivered one of the strongest statements concerning George W. Bush administration's position in regards to the current political situation in Russia. Cheney accused the Vladimir Putin government of taking measures that were anti-Democratic, and bullying his neighbors on energy. Cheney praised Lithuania, Latvia and Estonia for making rapid progress towards democracy. The Head of States discussed the situation in Belarus.

Participants of the Conference passed a common declaration as well. The Vilnius Conference 2006 ended on May 4, 2006.

== Heads of State participating in the conference ==
- President of Lithuania Valdas Adamkus
- President of Georgia Mikheil Saakashvili
- President of Ukraine Viktor Yushchenko
- President of Estonia Arnold Rüütel
- President of Latvia Vaira Vīķe-Freiberga
- President of Poland Lech Kaczyński
- President of Moldova Vladimir Voronin
- President of Bulgaria Georgi Parvanov
- President of Romania Traian Băsescu
