= Vitalijus Satkevičius =

Lithuanian mayor

Mayor of Panevėžys
- In office 2011–2015
- Preceded by: Povilas Vadopalas
- Succeeded by: Rytis Račkauskas

Mayor of Panevėžys
- In office 2008–2011
- Preceded by: Vitas Matuzas
- Succeeded by: Povilas Vadopalas

Personal details
- Born: 25 March 1961 (age 65) Paežeris, USSR
- Party: Homeland Union (since 2008)
- Other political affiliations: Lithuanian Christian Democrats (until 2008)
- Spouse: Eugenija
- Children: Justina, Martynas, Ieva
- Education: Kaunas Politechnical Institute

Vitalijus Satkevičius (born March 25, 1961) is a Lithuanian politician and former mayor of Panevėžys since 2011.

In 1988 he graduated from Kaunas Politechnical Institute. Vitalijus has been a member of the Panevėžys city council since 1997 and served as the mayor from 2008 to 2011 and since 2011.

Satkevičius is a devout Catholic and has been a member of the Society of Living Rosary since 1971.
