= President of Lithuania =

Head of state

President of the Republic of Lithuania
- Lietuvos Respublikos Prezidentas
- Presidential coat of arms

- Presidential standard
- Incumbent; Gitanas Nausėda since 12 July 2019
- Style: Mr. President (informal); Commander-in-chief (military); His Excellency (diplomatic)
- Type: Executive president Head of state
- Member of: European Council
- Residence: Presidential Palace, Vilnius
- Appointer: Direct election
- Term length: Five years, renewable once consecutively
- Constituting instrument: Constitution of Lithuania
- Inaugural holder: Antanas Smetona
- Formation: 4 April 1919; 107 years ago
- Abolished: 1940–1990
- Deputy: Speaker of the Seimas
- Salary: €123,516 (US$139,408.58) (annual, brutto)
- Website: www.lrp.lt

The president of the Republic of Lithuania (Lithuanian: Lietuvos Respublikos Prezidentas) is the head of state of the Republic of Lithuania. The president directs and appoints the executive branch of the Government of Lithuania, represents the nation internationally and is the commander-in-chief of the Lithuanian Armed Forces. The president is directly elected by the citizens of Lithuania for a five-year term, with the office holder limited to serving two terms consecutively. The current president is Gitanas Nausėda who assumed office on July 12, 2019.

== Eligibility ==
To be eligible for election, candidates must be at least 40 years old on the election day and reside in Lithuania for at least three years, in addition to satisfying the eligibility criteria for a member of the parliament. A person who has been removed from office through impeachment for breach of constitution or an oath of office may not be elected as a president.

== Powers ==
The Lithuanian president has somewhat more executive authority than their counterparts in neighboring Estonia and Latvia; the Lithuanian president's function is very similar to that of the presidents of France and Romania. Similarly to them, but unlike presidents in a fully presidential system such as the United States, the Lithuanian president generally has the most authority in foreign affairs. In addition to the customary diplomatic powers of Heads of State, namely receiving the letters of credence of foreign ambassadors and signing treaties, the president determines Lithuania's basic foreign policy guidelines. The president is also the commander-in-chief of the Lithuanian Armed Forces, and accordingly heads the State Defense Council and has the right to appoint the Chief of Defence (subject to Seimas consent).

The president also has a significant role in domestic policy, possessing the right to submit bills to the Seimas and to veto laws passed by it, appointing the prime minister and approving the government formed by them, and also having the right to dissolve the Seimas and call snap elections following a successful motion of no confidence or if the Seimas refuses to approve the government's budget within sixty days. However, the next elected Seimas may retaliate by calling for an earlier presidential election.

Finally, the president ensures an effective judiciary, being responsible for nominating one third of the judges of the Constitutional Court, and the entirety of the Supreme Court, for appointment by the Seimas; the president also has the right to directly appoint all other judges.

== Election ==
Under the Constitution of Lithuania adopted in 1992, the president is elected to a five-year term under a modified two-round system: a candidate requires an absolute majority of the vote and either voter turnout to be above 50% or for their vote share to be equivalent to at least one-third of the number of registered voters to win the election in the first round. If no candidate does so, the two candidates with the most votes face each other in a second round held two weeks later. Upon taking office, the president must suspend any formal membership in a political party.

If the president dies or becomes incapacitated while in office, the Speaker of the Seimas assumes the office until a new president can be inaugurated following fresh elections.

== List of presidents ==
No.	Portrait	Name (Birth–Death)	Elected	Took office	Left office	Affiliation/notes
1		Antanas Smetona (1874–1944)	1919	4 April 1919	19 June 1920	First president of the Republic of Lithuania.
2		Aleksandras Stulginskis (1885–1969)	–	19 June 1920	21 December 1922	Chairman of the Constituent Assembly Aleksandras Stulginskis served as acting president.
2		Aleksandras Stulginskis (1885–1969)	1922	21 December 1922	7 June 1926	
3		Kazys Grinius (1866–1950)	1926	7 June 1926	18 December 1926	Last democratically elected president of the Republic of Lithuania during the interwar period.
Following the 1926 Lithuanian coup d'état, Jonas Staugaitis and Aleksandras Stulginskis served as acting presidents from 18 December 1926 to 19 December 1926.
(1)		Antanas Smetona (1874–1944)	1926	19 December 1926	15 June 1940	Undemocratically elected authoritarian leader serving as head of state until Lithuania's occupation by the Soviet Union in 1940.
–		Antanas Merkys (1887–1955) acting; unlawful	–	15 June 1940	17 June 1940	Prime Minister Antanas Merkys served as acting president.
–		Justas Paleckis (1899–1980) acting; unlawful	–	17 June 1940	24 August 1940	Installed as an acting puppet president by the Soviets.
Position abolished under the Lithuanian SSR during the first Soviet occupation of 1940–1941, remain abolished during the German occupation of 1941–1944, and abolished again under the restored Lithuanian SSR during the second Soviet occupation of 1944–1990
–		Vytautas Landsbergis (born 1932)	–	11 March 1990	25 November 1992	As Chairman of the Supreme Council.
4		Algirdas Brazauskas (1932–2010)	–	25 November 1992	25 February 1993	Speaker of the Seimas Algirdas Brazauskas served as acting president.
4		Algirdas Brazauskas (1932–2010)	1993	25 February 1993	25 February 1998	First directly elected president of the Republic of Lithuania.
5		Valdas Adamkus (born 1926)	1997–98	26 February 1998	26 February 2003	
6		Rolandas Paksas (born 1956)	2002–03	26 February 2003	6 April 2004	Impeached and removed from office.
–		Artūras Paulauskas (born 1953) acting	–	6 April 2004	12 July 2004	Speaker of the Seimas Artūras Paulauskas served as acting president.
7		Valdas Adamkus (born 1926)	2004	12 July 2004	12 July 2009	
8		Dalia Grybauskaitė (born 1956)	2009; 2014	12 July 2009	12 July 2019	First female president of Lithuania. Became the first president to be re-elected.
9		Gitanas Nausėda (born 1964)	2019; 2024	12 July 2019	Incumbent	

Posthumously recognized by the Parliament

No.	Portrait	Name (Birth–Death)	Elected	Took office	Left office	Affiliation/notes
–		General; Jonas Žemaitis (1909–1954)	–	16 February 1949	26 November 1954	Posthumously recognized on March 12, 2009 by the parliament as acting president.
–		Colonel; Adolfas Ramanauskas (1918–1957)	–	26 November 1954	29 November 1957	Posthumously recognized on November 20, 2018 by the parliament as acting president.

== See also ==
- Speaker of the Seimas
- Presidential Palace, Vilnius
