= 2002–03 Lithuanian presidential election =

- 22 December 2002 (first round); 5 January 2003 (second round)
- Turnout: 53.92% (first round); 52.65% (second round)
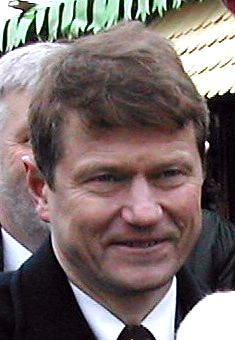

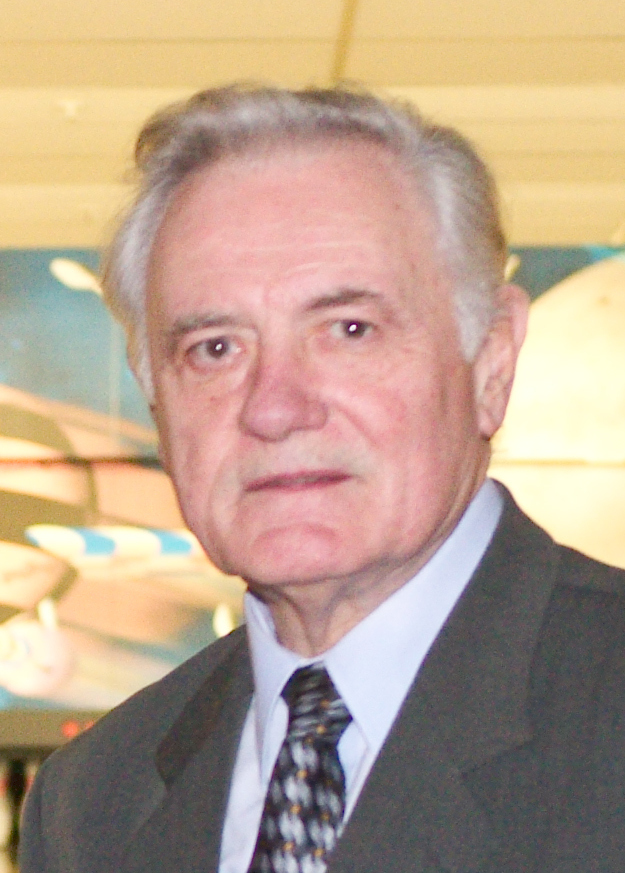
| Nominee | Rolandas Paksas | Valdas Adamkus |
| Party | LDP | Independent |
| Popular vote | 777,769 | 643,870 |
| Percentage | 54.71% | 45.29% |
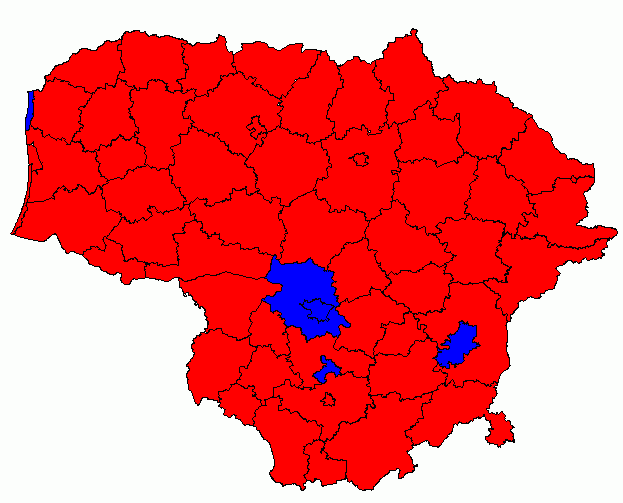
- Results (second round); Legend: – Rolandas Paksas – Valdas Adamkus
President before election
Valdas Adamkus
Independent
Elected President
Rolandas Paksas
LDP

Presidential elections were held in Lithuania on 22 December 2002, with a second round on 5 January 2003. Incumbent President Valdas Adamkus ran for reelection alongside sixteen other candidates, the largest field of presidential candidates in the country's history. Though Adamkus held a large lead over his closest opponent, Rolandas Paksas of the Liberal Democratic Party (LDP), in the first round of the election, Paksas defeated Adamkus in the second round with 54.71% of the vote.

The election is considered to be one of the most important presidential elections in Lithuanian history since 1990. Paksas's victory and subsequent impeachment in 2004 led to the rise of the Order and Justice party.

== Background ==
=== Presidential powers ===
The Lithuanian president has somewhat more executive authority than their counterparts in neighboring Estonia and Latvia; the Lithuanian president's function is similar to that of the presidents of France and Romania. Similarly to them, but unlike presidents in a fully presidential system such as the United States, the Lithuanian president generally has the most authority in foreign affairs. In addition to the customary diplomatic powers of Heads of State, namely receiving the letters of credence of foreign ambassadors and signing treaties, the president determines Lithuania's basic foreign policy guidelines. The president is also the commander-in-chief of the Lithuanian Armed Forces, and accordingly heads the State Defense Council and has the right to appoint the Chief of Defence (subject to Seimas consent).

The president also has a significant role in domestic policy, possessing the right to submit bills to the Seimas and to veto laws passed by it, appointing the prime minister and approving the government formed by them, and also having the right to dissolve the Seimas and call snap elections following a successful motion of no confidence or if the Seimas refuses to approve the government's budget within sixty days. However, the next elected Seimas may retaliate by calling for an earlier presidential election. In addition, according to a resolution by the Constitutional Court of Lithuania in 1998, the president is required by law to nominate the candidate of the parliamentary majority to the office of prime minister.

The president also holds informal power, as the office of president is generally more trusted by the populace according to approval polling, and Lithuanian presidents historically blocked legislation and forced the resignation of prime ministers (such as Gediminas Vagnorius in 1998).

=== Electoral system ===
The president is elected using the two-round system. To win in the first round, a candidate requires an absolute majority of all votes cast (including invalid votes) and either voter turnout to be above 50% or for their vote share to be equivalent to at least one-third of the number of registered voters. If no candidate wins in the first round, a second round is required, featuring the top two candidates. While some candidates belong to and/or are supported by a political party, the office of the president is formally non-partisan.

Citizens of Lithuania at least 40 years of age whose at least one parent was also a citizen (natural-born-citizen clause), who have lived in Lithuania for at least three years prior, are not serving a prison sentence, are not on active duty in the Lithuanian Armed Forces, are not bound to any other country by an oath and have never been impeached, are allowed to run for president. Each candidate must collect at least 20 thousand signatures by Lithuanian citizens to be able to run for election.

=== Previous election ===
The previous election was held in 1997 and 1998. The winner of the election was independent candidate Valdas Adamkus, who defeated deputy general prosecutor and independent candidate Artūras Paulauskas and Homeland Union chairman Vytautas Landsbergis. The election was noted for irregularities and violent incidents - Adamkus's chief of staff Raimundas Mieželis was beaten by hooligans prior to the first round, Paulauskas claimed that he was followed by secret service who answered to Landsbergis, and the narrow result in the second round raised allegations of electoral fraud.

== Candidates ==
20 individuals applied to be candidates in the election. Three of them, Stanislovas Buškevičius (Young Lithuania), Kazimieras Uoka and Vytautas Kundrotas did not provide the signatures necessary to be registered. Eight of the registered candidates were independents and nine belonged to political parties at time of registration.

=== Rolandas Paksas ===
Paksas was a former national aerobatics champion who had at time of the election served for two times as Prime Minister of Lithuania, first from May to October 1999 and second time from October 2000 to June 2001. Originally leading a Homeland Union cabinet in 1999, Paksas resigned in protest to the sale of the Mažeikiai oil refinery to the American Williams Companies - though he was forced to leave the party, his popularity soared and he was later appointed as an advisor on energy policy to the President.

Paksas then joined the Liberal Union, a small classical liberal party which was connected to the fraudulent EBSW business conglomerate. Under his leadership, the party grew from 1 to 34 seats in the 2000 Lithuanian parliamentary election. Encouraged by Adamkus, the Liberals formed a "New Politics" coalition (Lithuanian: "Naujosios politikos" koalicija) with the New Union (Social Liberals), with supply and confidence from the Peasants and New Democratic Party Union, forming Paksas Cabinet II. It was the first cabinet in Lithuania's history since 1990 which had neither the Homeland Union or the Democratic Labour Party of Lithuania in its composition.

It was a minority government and collapsed on 18 June 2001, when all New Union ministers withdrew from the government and the party announced its intention to form a government with the Social Democratic Party. A few months later, he resigned as chairman of the Liberal Union after criticism from the party's council. Paksas and his loyalists subsequently left the party and established the Liberal Democratic Party. Paksas ran as the party's presidential candidate.

=== Valdas Adamkus ===
Adamkus, a former official of the Environmental Protection Agency and a member of the Lithuanian diaspora during the Cold War, was elected President in 1998. During his term, Lithuania progressed in its goal to join the European Union and NATO, but internal politics were fragile. After the collapse of the cabinet of Gediminas Vagnorius due to his conflict with the president, Adamkus promoted Paksas as a protégé. Adamkus also encourage the formation of the short-lived "New Politics" coalition.

=== Artūras Paulauskas ===
Paulauskas was Adamkus's opponent in the 1998 presidential election and afterwards founded the New Union (Social Liberals), which won the second largest number of seats in the 2000 parliamentary election and formed the "New Politics" coalition with Paksas's Liberal Union. Paulauskas was elected as the Speaker of the Seimas and was endorsed as the coalition's candidate in the country's next presidential election - however, the deal was rescinded after the collapse of the coalition and Paksas's decision to run for the election himself.

Before the election, Paulauskas voiced his hesitation to participate, as the chaotic nature of the newly elected parliament, which he served as the Speaker of, caused a downfall of his approval ratings. In spite of this, he, alongside chairman of the Social Democratic Party Algirdas Mykolas Brazauskas, was seen as the most realistic opponent to Adamkus before the election.

Despite his party being in a coalition with the Social Democrats, they did not endorse Paulauskas and instead ran Vytenis Andriukaitis as a candidate. He was backed by the party's local organizations from the left flank as a symbol that the party was not entirely taken over by the Democratic Labour Party of Lithuania since their merger in 2001.

=== Vytautas Šerėnas ===
Šerėnas was the host of the political satire TV show "Bicycle News" (Lithuanian: "Dviračio žinios") and ran as a satirical political candidate. Among his promises on the election trail was the construction of a bridge between Klaipėda and Stockholm, a "faster" tram line between Klaipėda and Vilnius, and a mandatory purchase of a portion of cepelinai by every citizen. In spite of this, some claimed that his campaign was more measured and understanding of presidential powers than of some other candidates.

Arūnas Valinskas, who later founded the National Resurrection Party, claimed that he convinced Šerėnas to run in order to reveal the absurdity of the election.

=== Other candidates ===
Several candidates represented various political parties. Vytenis Andriukaitis represented the Social Democratic Party, Kazimira Prunskienė ran as the candidate of the Peasants and New Democratic Party Union, and Eugenijus Gentvilas ran as the candidate of the Liberal Union.

Juozas Edvardas Petraitis, an Australian-Lithuanian businessman, ran as an independent candidate and was the wealthiest candidate in the race, with a declared total wealth of 145 million litas. The election was contested by two brothers - Algimantas Matulevičius and Vytautas Matulevičius, both of whom ran as independents.

== Campaign ==
Prior to the election, Algirdas Mykolas Brazauskas, the chairman of the Social Democratic Party who returned to politics in 2001, was seen as the most realistic challenger to Adamkus. As Brazauskas did not run, and Adamkus enjoyed high approval ratings at the beginning of the race, he conducted a passive campaign. The Adamkus campaign was run by Artūras Zuokas, Darius Kuolys and Albinas Januška. According to correspondent Audrius Bačiulis, the campaign was ineffective and its leading personalities lacked cooperation, whereas the president and his staff were certain that victory was inevitable:

Long before these elections, they were certain - George W. Bush will fly over, wave his hand from the steps of the Town Hall, Lithuania is invited to NATO, and the elections are in the pocket.

— Audrius Bačiulis

According to a 2001 summer poll by the polling agency Baltijos tyrimai, 3.4% of the respondents stated that they would vote for Paksas in the presidential election, and according to a Vilmorus poll at the same period, only 33.9% of the respondents viewed him positively. Paksas formed a team led by journalist Aurelijus Katkevičius, described as "Paksas's political sculptor". Katkevičius's strategy was to establish Paksas as a strongman who would restore law and order against the more passive Adamkus - on the campaign trail, Paksas became known for radical promises such as restoring the death sentence, strictly controlling the actions of the Government of Lithuania, the country's spending and the size of pensions, and ordering police to patrol schools with detection dogs.

To bypass the media, which he believed to be hostile to him, Paksas visited voters directly, often traveling via helicopter, which earned him the nickname "Flying Rolandas". The helicopter was loaned to Paksas by Russian businessman and owner of the aviation company Aviabaltika Yuri Borisov. Borisov also donated 1.2 million litas ($400,000) to Paksas's election campaign. Paksas also organized aviation stunts, the most famous of which was his flight under the bridge over the Neris river on 3 October 2002.

Paksas's success in the election has been attributed to the organized structure of his campaign and its professionalism, which was unprecedented in Lithuanian politics at the time, as well as his campaign's large financial resources, which, during his impeachment proceedings, were counted to have been 18 to 19 million litas.

== Results ==
| Candidate | Party | First round | | Second round | |
| Candidate | Party | Votes | % | Votes | % |
|---|---|---|---|---|---|
| Valdas Adamkus | Independent | 514,154 | 35.53 | 643,870 | 45.29 |
| Rolandas Paksas | Liberal Democratic Party | 284,559 | 19.66 | 777,769 | 54.71 |
| Artūras Paulauskas | New Union (Social Liberals) | 120,238 | 8.31 | | |
| Vytautas Šerėnas | Independent | 112,215 | 7.75 | | |
| Vytenis Andriukaitis | Social Democratic Party | 105,584 | 7.30 | | |
| Kazimira Prunskienė | Peasants and New Democratic Party Union | 72,925 | 5.04 | | |
| Juozas Edvardas Petraitis | Independent | 54,139 | 3.74 | | |
| Eugenijus Gentvilas | Liberal Union | 44,562 | 3.08 | | |
| Julius Veselka | Lithuanian People's Union | 32,293 | 2.23 | | |
| Algimantas Matulevičius | Independent | 32,137 | 2.22 | | |
| Kazys Bobelis | Lithuanian Christian Democrats | 27,613 | 1.91 | | |
| Vytautas Matulevičius | Independent | 26,888 | 1.86 | | |
| Kęstutis Glaveckas | Lithuanian Centre Union | 7,554 | 0.52 | | |
| Vytautas Šustauskas | Lithuanian Liberty Union | 5,372 | 0.37 | | |
| Vytautas Bernatonis | Independent | 3,546 | 0.25 | | |
| Algirdas Pilvelis | Independent | 2,074 | 0.14 | | |
| Rimantas Jonas Dagys | Social Democracy 2000 | 1,264 | 0.09 | | |
| Total | | 1,447,117 | 100.00 | 1,421,639 | 100.00 |
| Valid votes | | 1,447,117 | 98.68 | 1,421,639 | 98.98 |
| Invalid/blank votes | | 19,419 | 1.32 | 14,683 | 1.02 |
| Total votes | | 1,466,536 | 100.00 | 1,436,322 | 100.00 |
| Registered voters/turnout | | 2,719,608 | 53.92 | 2,727,805 | 52.65 |
Source: Central Election Commission, Central Election Commission
