= Mayor of Panevėžys =

Executive Leader of Panevėžys City

Mayor of Panevėžys City
- Panevėžio miesto meras
- Coat of Arms of Panevėžys

- Flag of Panevėžys
- Incumbent; Loreta Masiliūnienė since 14 April 2025
- Style: Ms. Mayor (formal); Her Excellency (diplomatic)
- Appointer: Popular vote
- Term length: Four years, renewable
- Formation: 1503; 523 years ago
- Website: www.panevezys.lt/struktura-ir-kontaktai

The mayor of Panevėžys (Lithuanian: Panevėžio meras) is the head of the city of Panevėžys and Panevėžys city municipality. The current incumbent is Loreta Masiliūnienė.

The 2025 Panevėžys City mayoral election decided the next mayor of Panevėžys, with Loreta Masiliūnienė succeeding Petras Luomanas.

== Overview ==
The mayor of Panevėžys is the elected head of the municipal government in Panevėžys, Lithuania's fifth-largest city. The mayor holds significant executive powers, overseeing the city's administration, managing public services, implementing decisions made by the Panevėžys City Council, and representing the city in both national and international affairs. The position is directly elected by the citizens of Panevėžys, with a term of four years and no limit on re-election. The mayor is responsible for shaping urban development, managing city resources, and enhancing the overall quality of life for residents. The current acting mayor, Petras Luomanas, has held the position since 2024.
