= Rolandas Paksas =

President of Lithuania from 2003 to 2004

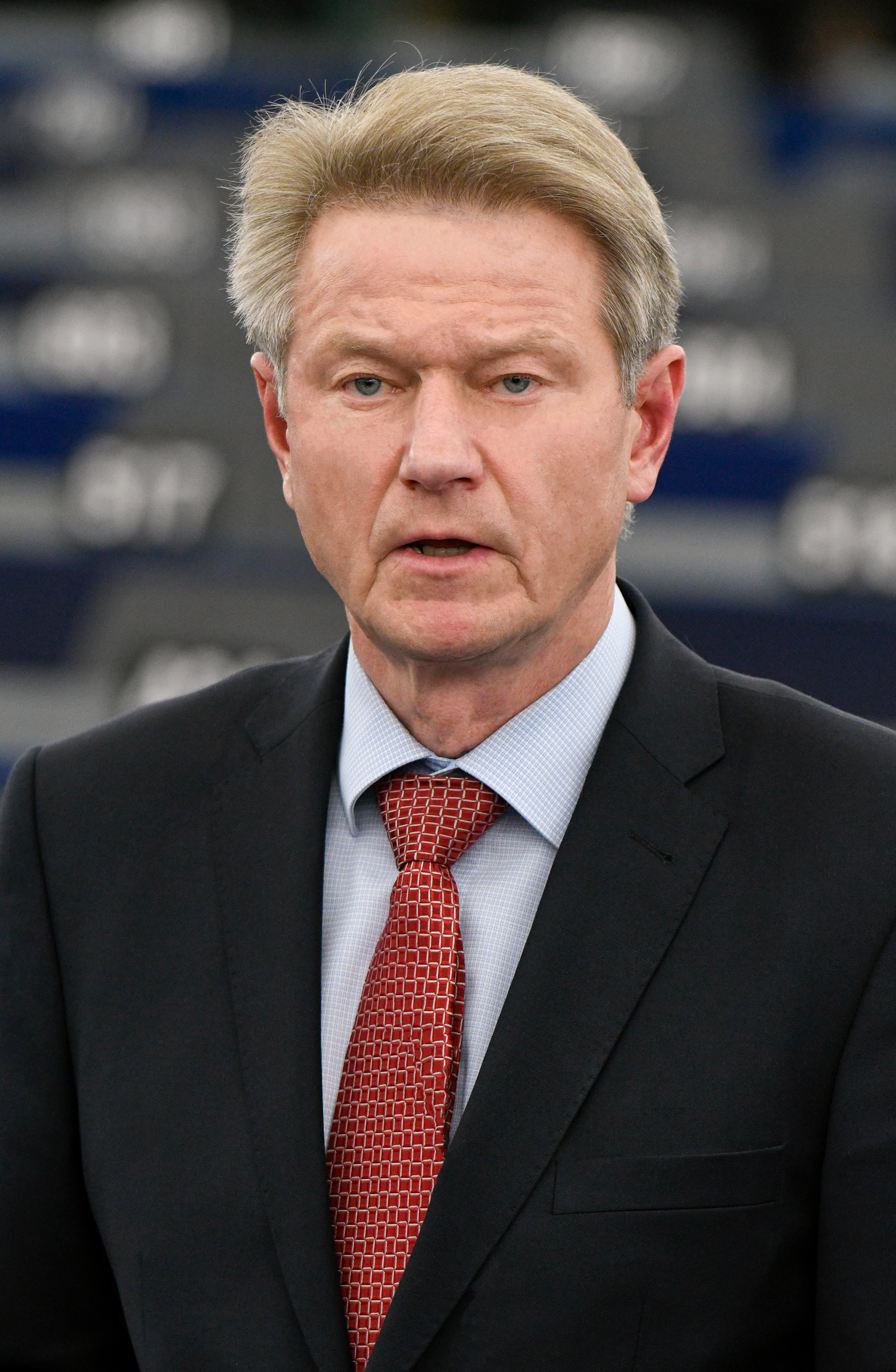
- Paksas in 2018

6th President of Lithuania
- In office 26 February 2003 – 6 April 2004
- Prime Minister: Algirdas Brazauskas
- Preceded by: Valdas Adamkus
- Succeeded by: Artūras Paulauskas (acting)

Member of European Parliament
- In office 4 June 2009 – 1 July 2019

9th and 11th Prime Minister of Lithuania
- In office 26 October 2000 – 20 June 2001
- President: Valdas Adamkus
- Preceded by: Andrius Kubilius
- Succeeded by: Eugenijus Gentvilas (acting)
- In office 18 May 1999 – 27 October 1999
- President: Valdas Adamkus
- Preceded by: Irena Degutienė (acting)
- Succeeded by: Irena Degutienė (acting)

Leader of the Opposition (Lithuania)
- In office 12 July 2001 – 1 November 2001
- Succeeded by: Gintaras Steponavičius (interim)

Member of the Seimas
- In office 19 October 2000 – 15 February 2003
- Preceded by: Aloyzas Sakalas
- Succeeded by: Andrius Kubilius
- Constituency: Antakalnis

Personal details
- Born: 10 June 1956 (age 70) Telšiai, then part of Lithuanian SSR, Soviet Union
- Party: Communist Party of Lithuania (1983~1989); Democratic Labour Party (1989–1995); Homeland Union (1995–1999); Liberal Union (1999–2002); Order and Justice (2002~2003, 2004–2018); Independent (2003~2004, 2018–present)
- Spouse: Laima Paksienė
- Children: 2
- Education: Vilnius Gediminas Technical University; Leningrad Civil Aviation Academy
- Profession: Pilot, politician, businessman, engineer

Military service
- Allegiance: Lithuania
- Branch/service: National Defence Volunteer Forces
- Rank: Major

Rolandas Paksas (Note: Lithuanian pronunciation: [rɔˈɫɐ̂ˑndɐs ˈpaːksɐs]) (born 10 June 1956) is a Lithuanian politician who served as the sixth president of Lithuania from 2003 until his impeachment in April 2004. He previously served two terms as the prime minister of Lithuania in 1999 and again from 2000 to 2001, and as Mayor of Vilnius from 1997 to 1999 and again from 2000 to 2001. He led Order and Justice from 2004 to 2016 and was a Member of the European Parliament from 2009 to 2019.

A national aerobatics champion in the 1980s, after the collapse of the Soviet Union, Paksas founded a construction company, Restako. In 1997, he was elected to the Vilnius City Council for the centre-right Homeland Union and became mayor. In May 1999, Paksas was appointed Prime Minister but resigned five months later after a disagreement over privatisation. Paksas joined the Liberal Union of Lithuania (LLS) in 2000. The LLS won the 2000 election, and Paksas became Prime Minister again, but he left within seven months after another dispute over economic reforms.

In 2002, Paksas founded the Liberal Democratic Party, aiming to attract diverse political support through a populist and reformist agenda. He then contested the Lithuanian presidential election, 2002–2003, positioning himself as an anti-establishment candidate. Despite trailing incumbent President Valdas Adamkus in the first round with 19.7% of the vote, Paksas secured a significant upset in the run-off election on January 5, 2003, winning with 54.7% of the vote. This victory was attributed to his ability to appeal to disenchanted voters who sought a break from the political status quo.

Shortly after assuming office, Paksas initiated a series of reforms, including anti-corruption measures targeting public officials involved in illegal land acquisitions. However, his presidency was soon mired in scandal. In October 2003, allegations surfaced that Paksas had unlawfully granted Lithuanian citizenship to Yury Borisov, a Russian businessman and one of his major campaign donors. Investigations revealed that Borisov had provided substantial financial support to Paksas's campaign and was granted citizenship in return, circumventing standard legal procedures.

Further investigations exposed troubling connections between senior members of Paksas's administration and Russian criminal organizations, raising concerns about national security. The controversies culminated in impeachment proceedings in early 2004. On April 6, 2004, the Lithuanian Parliament (Seimas) voted to remove Paksas from office on three charges: unlawfully granting citizenship, leaking classified information, and interfering in private business matters.

Following his impeachment, Paksas was banned from running for the Seimas (Lithuanian parliament). This lifetime ban was ruled a disproportionate measure by the European Court of Human Rights in 2011. In April 2022, the Lithuanian Parliament amended the Constitution to allow impeached individuals to run for parliamentary office after ten years, thereby reinstating Paksas's eligibility to stand as a candidate.

While serving as a Member of the European Parliament from 2009 to 2019, Paksas focused on various issues, but after leaving office, he largely stepped away from active political roles. His presidency remains a subject of controversy, with ongoing debates about his legacy in Lithuanian politics. Some analysts still regard his impeachment as a turning point for Lithuania's political accountability.

== Early life, education and non-political career ==
Paksas was born in Telšiai to Feliksas and Elena. In 1974, he attended Zemaites High School and continued his studies at the Vilnius Civil Engineering Institute (now Vilnius Gediminas Technical University). Paksas received a degree in civil engineering in 1979. In 1984, he graduated from the Leningrad Civil Aviation Academy. During this period, he competed in aerobatics competitions, participating in both Soviet and Lithuanian teams and winning several championships.

From 1992 to 1997, Rolandas Paksas was the President of the construction company "Restako".

== Political career ==
=== Mayor of Vilnius and Prime Minister ===
Rolandas Paksas began his political journey in the early 1990s as a member of the Democratic Labour Party of Lithuania (LDDP), which was considered left-leaning. In 1995, Paksas made a significant shift in his political alignment, joining the conservative Homeland Union (Lithuanian Conservatives), which was a major move toward the right wing of the Lithuanian political spectrum. In 1997, he was elected to the Vilnius City Council and subsequently became the Mayor of Vilnius, a position he held until 1999.

In May 1999, following the resignation of prime minister Gediminas Vagnorius, President Valdas Adamkus nominated Paksas to replace him. At the time, the Homeland Union held 68 seats in the Seimas and had formed a coalition with the Lithuanian Christian Democratic Party, making up a majority of 81 seats in the 138-seat parliament. This coalition was crucial in securing Paksas's appointment as prime minister.

Paksas formally assumed the position of prime minister in June 1999, heading the ninth post-independence government of Lithuania. However, his term as prime minister was short-lived, lasting only five months. In October 1999, Paksas resigned from the position due to a dispute over the privatization of Mažeikių Nafta, Lithuania's largest oil refinery, which was sold to a US-based oil company. The deal and the way it was handled created significant internal political friction. Following his resignation, Paksas was appointed as Special Assignments Envoy to President Adamkus.

After departing from the Homeland Union, Paksas joined the Liberal Union of Lithuania (LLS), a centrist party. In April 2000, he returned as the Mayor of Vilnius. Later in 2000, he became Prime Minister once again, after being appointed to head Lithuania's 11th Cabinet. Paksas held the position from November 2000 to June 2001. His second term was also marked by disagreements within the coalition, which led to his departure.

== President of Lithuania ==
On 5 January 2003, Rolandas Paksas was elected as President of Lithuania after a surprise victory over the incumbent Valdas Adamkus in a runoff election. In the first round, Paksas finished second with 19.7% of the vote, but in the runoff, he garnered 54.9%, marking a significant political upset. His campaign platform included pledges to reduce poverty, address income disparities, combat corruption, and move Lithuania towards a more market-oriented economy. Additionally, Paksas controversially proposed introducing the death penalty for drug traffickers, which resonated with some segments of the electorate.

Paksas's presidency began on 26 February 2003. However, his term was quickly overshadowed by allegations of ties to the Russian mafia. One of his campaign donors, Yuri Borisov, a Russian businessman and president of the aviation company Avia Baltika, had contributed $400,000 to Paksas's campaign. In return, Paksas granted Borisov Lithuanian citizenship through a presidential decree, which the Constitutional Court of Lithuania later ruled unconstitutional.

Concerns about Paksas's associations led to an investigation by the State Security Department of Lithuania, which uncovered further allegations of leaked classified information to Borisov and interference in privatization processes. In early 2004, the Seimas initiated impeachment proceedings. On 31 March 2004, the Constitutional Court of Lithuania found Paksas guilty of violating the Constitution of Lithuania and his oath of office. On 6 April 2004, the Seimas voted on three charges: leaking classified information, improperly restoring Borisov's citizenship, and interfering in a privatization transaction. The vote succeeded, resulting in Paksas's removal from office, making him the first European head of state to be impeached and removed from office.

=== Post-impeachment legal proceedings ===
Following his impeachment, Paksas expressed intent to run in the June 2004 presidential election. In response, the Seimas passed a constitutional amendment on 4 May 2004 barring impeached individuals from running for the presidency for five years. This amendment was later challenged, and the Constitutional Court of Lithuania ruled that individuals who had violated the Constitution or their oath of office could never again hold public offices requiring an oath.

Legal battles continued for years. In 2005, the District Court of Vilnius acquitted Paksas of charges related to disclosing classified information. However, the decision was overturned by the Court of Appeals of Lithuania, which found Paksas guilty of a criminal act. Despite this, the court did not impose a penalty, reasoning that his departure from public service rendered him no longer a threat.

In 2011, the European Court of Human Rights ruled that the lifetime prohibition preventing Paksas from running for the Seimas was disproportionate and violated the European Convention on Human Rights. This decision prompted further debates about constitutional reforms in Lithuania.

=== Later political career ===
In September 2018, Paksas suspended his membership in the Order and Justice party, citing dissatisfaction with party decisions and internal conflicts. Although he distanced himself from the party, legal and political constraints, including the lifetime ban on holding offices requiring an oath, continued to limit his political ambitions. He has since expressed interest in forming a new political movement but remains barred from running for president or serving as the Speaker of the Seimas.

== Personal life ==
Rolandas Paksas is married to Laima Paksienė and has two children; Inga and Mindaugas. He is also a former member of both Soviet and Lithuanian national aerobatic teams, and a skilled stunt pilot who currently performs around the world.

In 2006, Rolandas Paksas made a 47-day flight around the world, a trip which started and ended at Kyviškės airfield.

Political offices
Preceded by Irena Degutienė; Acting	Prime Minister of Lithuania; 1999	Succeeded by Irena Degutienė; Acting
Preceded by Andrius Kubilius	Prime Minister of Lithuania; 2000–2001	Succeeded by Eugenijus Gentvilas; Acting
Preceded by Valdas Adamkus	President of Lithuania; 2003–2004	Succeeded by Artūras Paulauskas; Acting
