= Valdas Adamkus =

President of Lithuania (1998–2003; 2004–2009)

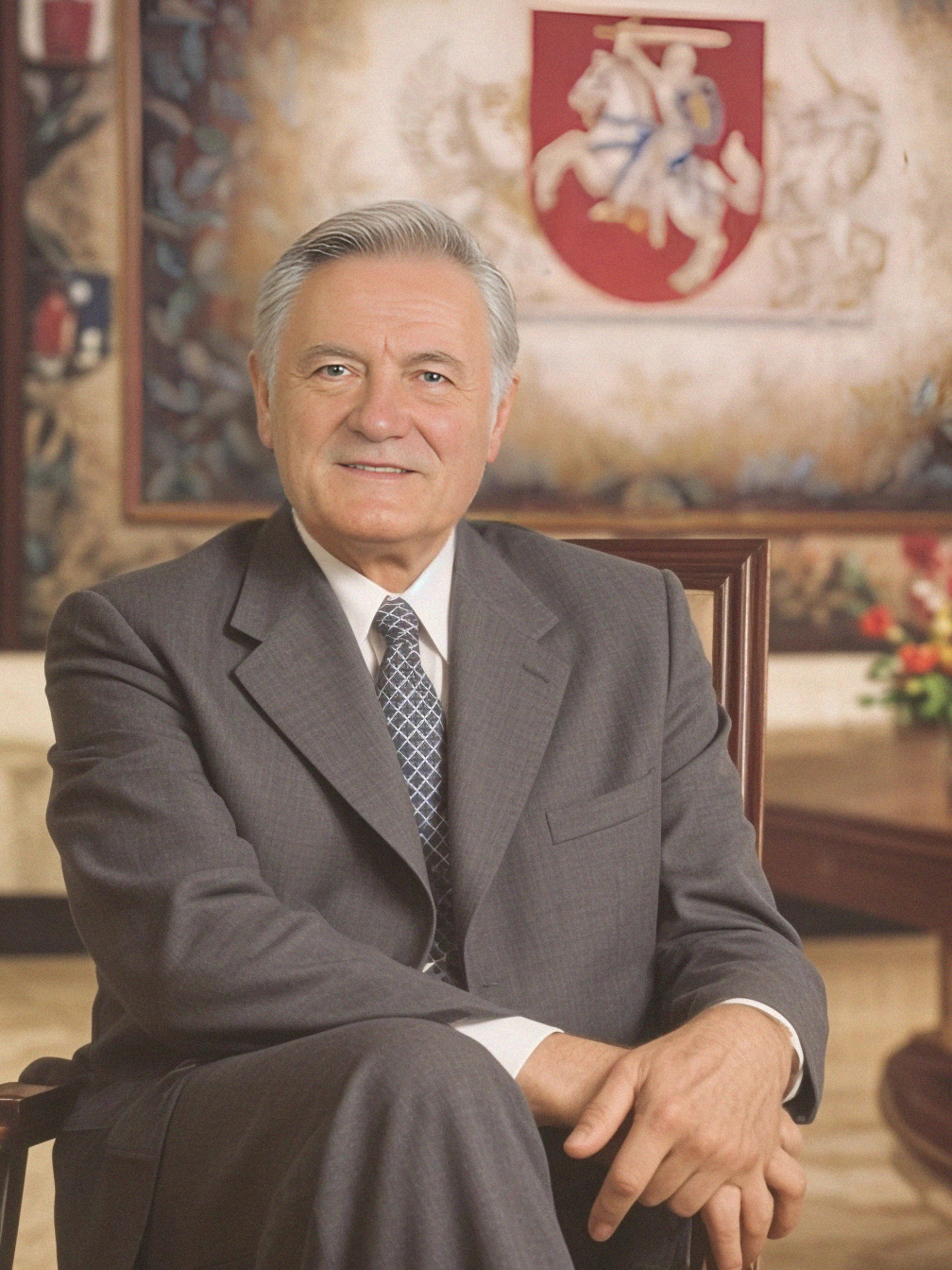
- Official portrait, 1998

5th & 7th President of Lithuania
- In office 12 July 2004 – 12 July 2009
- Prime Minister: List: Algirdas Brazauskas Zigmantas Balčytis (Acting) Gediminas Kirkilas Andrius Kubilius
- Preceded by: Artūras Paulauskas (Acting)
- Succeeded by: Dalia Grybauskaitė
- In office 26 February 1998 – 26 February 2003
- Prime Minister: List: Gediminas Vagnorius Irena Degutienė (Acting) Rolandas Paksas Irena Degutienė (Acting) Andrius Kubilius Rolandas Paksas Eugenijus Gentvilas (Acting) Algirdas Brazauskas
- Preceded by: Algirdas Brazauskas
- Succeeded by: Rolandas Paksas

Personal details
- Born: Voldemaras Adamkavičius; 3 November 1926 (age 100) Kaunas, Lithuania
- Citizenship: Lithuania; United States (until 1998)
- Party: Independent
- Other political affiliations: Republican Party
- Spouse: Alma Adamkienė (m. 1951; died 2023)
- Education: Ludwig-Maximilians-Universität München; Illinois Institute of Technology
- Profession: Civil engineer, civil servant

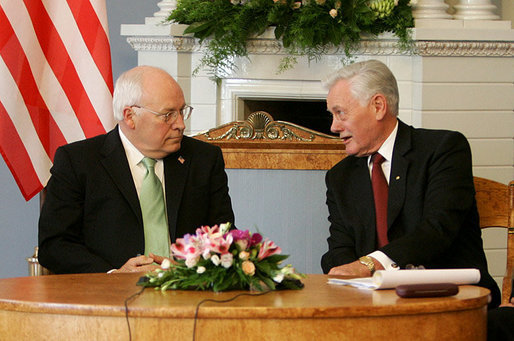
President Adamkus meeting with Vice President of the United States Dick Cheney in Lithuania. The meeting took place during the Vilnius Conference 2006: Common Visions for Common Neighborhoods.

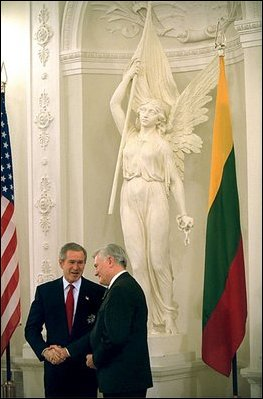
Adamkus shaking hands with George W. Bush in the Presidential Palace in Vilnius. In the background is a copy of a famous sculpture by Juozas Zikaras, the Statue of Liberty.

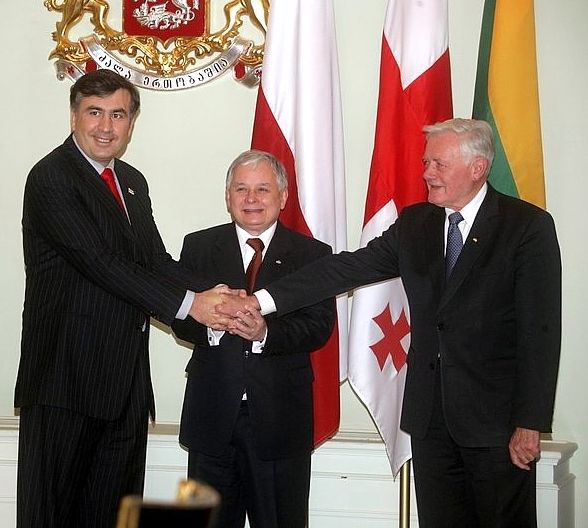
Mikheil Saakashvili, Lech Kaczyński and Valdas Adamkus in Tbilisi, November 2007

Valdas Adamkus (Note: Lithuanian pronunciation: [ˈvɐ̂ˑɫdɐs ɐˈdɐmˑkʊs]) (born Voldemaras Adamkavičius; 3 November 1926) is a Lithuanian politician, diplomat, civil engineer and civil servant. He served as the fifth and seventh president of Lithuania from 1998 to 2003 and again from 2004 to 2009.

Adamkus was born in Kaunas, and briefly served in the Fatherland Defense Force before emigrating to the United States, where he became a high-ranking civil servant in the Environmental Protection Agency. He returned to Lithuania in 1997, where he became involved in politics. Adamkus' first tenure as president lasted for five years, from 26 February 1998 to 26 February 2003, following his defeat by Rolandas Paksas in the 2003 presidential election. Paksas was later impeached and removed from office by a parliamentary vote on 6 April 2004. Soon afterwards, when a new election was announced, Adamkus again ran for president and was re-elected. His approval ratings increased during this period and he became a highly regarded moral authority in the state. He was succeeded as president on 12 July 2009 by Dalia Grybauskaitė. He is considered by some as being one of the best Lithuanian leaders in modern history.

He was married to Alma Adamkienė, who was involved in charitable activities in Lithuania. Following the end of his term as president, Adamkus remained involved in international development, and is a member of the European Academy of Diplomacy.

== Early life ==
Adamkus was born on 3 November 1926 in Kaunas, under the name Voldemaras Adamkavičius. He changed his name to Valdas Adamkus in 1955. His uncle was Edvardas Adamkavičius, a general in the Lithuanian Armed Forces during the interwar period. While a pupil at the Aušra Gymnasium in Kaunas, he took part in the resistance against the Nazi occupation. In his youth, he was a keen athlete and set a national record in the 100 meters.

In 1944, as Soviet forces returned to Lithuania, Adamkus fought against them as a member of the Fatherland Defense Force. He then left Lithuania for Germany with his parents. He finished the Lithuanian gymnasium in Eichstätt in 1946 and enrolled in the Faculty of Natural Sciences at the Ludwig-Maximilians-Universität München. At the 1948 Olympiad of Enslaved Nations in Nuremberg, held for displaced athletes, he won two gold medals in the high jump and long jump and two silver medals in sprint events.

== Life in the United States ==
In 1949, Adamkus emigrated with his family to the United States and settled in Chicago's Lithuanian American community. He first worked in a car parts factory and later as a draftsman for an engineering firm. He became a United States citizen in 1955. He and his wife Alma lived in the Lithuanian enclave of Marquette Park before moving to the suburb of Hinsdale. Adamkus graduated with a degree in civil engineering from the Illinois Institute of Technology in 1960.

Adamkus was active in the Lithuanian diaspora. He was vice-chairman of the liberal émigré federation Santara–Šviesa from 1958 to 1965 and later served as its chairman. As a student, he and other Lithuanian Americans collected about 40,000 signatures on a petition asking the United States government to intervene against the deportation of Lithuanians to Siberia. The petition was presented to Vice President Richard Nixon. Adamkus also raised concerns about Soviet activities in occupied Lithuania with UN Secretary-General Dag Hammarskjöld in 1958 and with President John F. Kennedy in 1962. In 1983, he chaired the organizing committee of the World Lithuanian Games.

=== Career at the EPA ===
Adamkus joined the EPA at its creation in 1970 and became deputy administrator of its Midwest regional office in Chicago in 1971. He served as deputy regional administrator for about a decade, including during the Carter administration. In 1972, he took part in environmental talks between the United States and the Soviet Union, and he visited Lithuania that year for the first time since leaving it. The 1972 environmental agreement between the two countries allowed him to make further trips to Lithuania. The EPA awarded him its Gold Medal for Exceptional Service in 1978.

In 1981, President Ronald Reagan appointed Adamkus as regional administrator for EPA Region 5, which covered six Great Lakes states. His appointment was supported by the region's Republican governors and by environmental groups. He chaired the United States delegation to the Great Lakes water quality board of the International Joint Commission from 1980 to 1997. Encyclopædia Britannica describes a program that improved the water quality of the Great Lakes as his main achievement at the agency. In March 1983, he testified before a subcommittee of the House of Representatives that EPA headquarters had allowed officials of Dow Chemical to review a 1981 report on dioxin in a way that amounted to censorship. That year, the Lake Michigan Federation gave him its Rachel Carson Award for his work to clean up PCB contamination in Waukegan Harbor.

In the late 1980s and 1990s, Adamkus coordinated the EPA's technical assistance program for Estonia, Latvia and Lithuania. He retired in 1997 after more than 25 years in the agency's Midwest office, including 16 years as regional administrator. Britannica notes that he had the longest tenure of any senior executive at the EPA.

== President of Lithuania ==
=== 1997–1998 election ===
Adamkus re-established permanent residence in Lithuania in 1997. He decided to run for president at the age of 71, saying that he wanted to rid the country of corruption and "old Soviet ways". His eligibility was challenged because of the constitutional residency requirement, but a court ruled in his favor. Some critics called him a carpetbagger. Running as an independent, he was supported by the governing Homeland Union and its Christian Democratic allies.

In the first round on 21 December 1997, Adamkus came second with 28 per cent of the vote, behind the former prosecutor general Artūras Paulauskas with 45 per cent. In the runoff on 4 January 1998, he defeated Paulauskas by 49.88 per cent to 49.31 per cent, according to preliminary results. The Chicago Sun-Times put his margin at about 14,000 votes, and Adamkus credited his victory in part to voters in the Chicago diaspora. Before taking office, he renounced his United States citizenship at the American embassy in Vilnius.

=== First term (1998–2003) ===
Adamkus took office on 26 February 1998. He supported Lithuania's eventual membership of NATO and the European Union, worked to ease tensions with Russia and sought friendly relations with Lithuania's neighbours. In 1999, a long-running public feud between Adamkus and Prime Minister Gediminas Vagnorius ended with Vagnorius's resignation. In 2001, Adamkus met the Russian president Vladimir Putin, who told him that Russia could do nothing to stop Lithuania from joining NATO.

On 21 November 2002, NATO invited Lithuania and six other countries to join the alliance. Two days later, President George W. Bush visited Vilnius, where Adamkus presented him with the Grand Cross of the Order of Vytautas the Great. In a speech in Vilnius, Bush said that "anyone who would choose Lithuania as an enemy has also made an enemy of the United States of America".

Adamkus ran for re-election in the 2002–2003 election. Although he was credited with guiding Lithuania towards NATO and EU membership, he was defeated by Rolandas Paksas in the runoff on 5 January 2003 by a margin of about ten percentage points. In 2003, he was named a UNESCO Goodwill Ambassador for the Construction of Knowledge Societies.

=== 2004 election ===
In April 2004, Paksas was impeached and removed from office on charges related to corruption and breaches of the constitution, and a ruling of the Constitutional Court barred him from standing again. In the first round of the 2004 presidential election on 13 June, Adamkus received just over 30 per cent of the vote, and the former prime minister Kazimira Prunskienė received about 22 per cent. Adamkus defeated Prunskienė, who was backed by Paksas, in the runoff on 27 June. He took office for a second term on 12 July 2004.

=== Second term (2004–2009) ===
==== Foreign affairs ====
During the political crisis in Ukraine in late 2004, Adamkus acted as a mediator together with the Polish president Aleksander Kwaśniewski, the EU foreign policy chief Javier Solana and others. He recalled that the Ukrainian president Leonid Kuchma had asked the friends of the Ukrainian people to "come to Kiev immediately".

On 7 March 2005, Adamkus and the Estonian president Arnold Rüütel declined the Russian president's invitation to attend the celebrations in Moscow on 9 May marking the 60th anniversary of the end of the Second World War in Europe. Adamkus acknowledged that Russia had paid a "particularly high price" for victory over Nazi Germany, but said that the tragedy of the war had not ended for Lithuania in 1945. According to the presidential office, the deciding factor was Putin's recent defense of the Molotov–Ribbentrop Pact. In July 2005, the United States House of Representatives passed a resolution calling on Russia to acknowledge and condemn the Soviet occupation and annexation of the Baltic states from 1940 to 1991.

In November 2007, Adamkus was named European of the Year by the weekly European Voice at a ceremony at the Egmont Palace in Brussels, the first time the award had gone to a representative of one of the EU's new member states. The award recognized his role in the negotiations in June 2007 that resolved the dispute over the EU's constitutional treaty. During the Russo-Georgian War in August 2008, he travelled to Tbilisi with the presidents of Poland, Ukraine and Estonia and the Latvian prime minister. At a rally in support of Georgia, he told the crowd, "You are not alone, we are standing with you".

==== Domestic affairs ====
Adamkus enjoyed high approval ratings during his second term, and he came to be regarded as a moral authority in Lithuania. In his 2006 State of the Nation address, he set out his priorities as follows.

- Increasing public participation in the political realm
- Targeted and transparent use of the EU funds and opportunities for building a greater well-being in Lithuania
- Reforms in public governance, education and science, social support and health care
- The development of professional competence among civil servants, especially in assessing regulatory impacts
- Approval of a political code of ethics
- Direct mayoral elections, and elimination of the county system
- Construction of a new nuclear power unit in Ignalina
- Legislation regulating the selection, appointment, and promotion of judges
- Controlling "brain drain" by supporting research and higher education infrastructure

Having served the two terms allowed by the Constitution of Lithuania, Adamkus did not stand in the 2009 election and was succeeded by Grybauskaitė on 12 July 2009.

== Later life ==
Adamkus is a full member of the Club de Madrid, an association of former democratic heads of state and government, and a member of the International Honorary Council of the European Academy of Diplomacy. From 2010 to 2020, he chaired the council of Vytautas Magnus University in Kaunas. He was made an honorary citizen of Kaunas on 30 November 2006. The President Valdas Adamkus Library-Museum was established in Kaunas in 2011 and reopened after reconstruction on 29 April 2016. It presents his life and presidency and holds the archives of more than 50 Lithuanian émigré figures. He has written several books of memoirs and reflections, including Likimo vardas – Lietuva (1997), Be nutylėjimų (2004), Paskutinė kadencija (2011), Pareigos, kurios nesibaigia (2015) and Esu vienas iš jūsų (2018).

In May 2022, the Seimas awarded Adamkus the Aleksandras Stulginskis Star for his contribution to the negotiations on Lithuania's accession to NATO and the European Union. In March 2026, the European Parliament named him one of the first honorary knights of its new Order of Merit for Europe, with the ceremony held during the Parliament's plenary session in Strasbourg in May. In an interview before his 100th birthday, he said that he believed he had done what he could as president to fight for a better future. He is considered by some to be one of the best Lithuanian leaders of modern times. The historian Rimvydas Petrauskas described him as "still the most popular and trusted political figure in Lithuania".

== Personal life ==
Adamkus married Alma Nutautaitė in 1951, and the couple had no children. They funded the manufacture and installation of the largest bell of the Kaunas Carillon, which weighs 751 kilograms (1,656 lb). Alma Adamkienė died in May 2023 at the age of 96.

On 3 January 2025, Adamkus was admitted to the Santaros Clinics in Vilnius after a fall at home, and the hospital later said that his cardiac condition had worsened. He was discharged on 17 January 2025. He returned to hospital for a planned stay in March 2025. On 26 September 2025, he was hospitalized again with a suspected infection. In September 2026, he was admitted to Santaros Clinics with a sudden health problem and underwent surgery, and in October 2026 the hospital said that his condition was improving. On 3 November 2026, Adamkus turned 100.

== Honours and awards ==
According to the European Academy of Diplomacy, Adamkus has received 36 of the highest state decorations of various countries and honorary doctorates from 22 universities.

=== National honours ===
- Lithuania: Order of Vytautas the Great with Golden Chain (2003)
- Lithuania: Lithuanian Scout Association Order of the Iron Wolf
- Lithuania: Star Order of the Lithuanian Riflemen's Union
- Lithuania: Stasys Šalkauskis Prize (2003)
- Lithuania: Freedom Prize (2016)
- Lithuania: Aleksandras Stulginskis Star (2022)
- Lithuania: Medal for Merits to Vilnius and the Nation (2019)
- Lithuania: Golden Order of the State Emblem of Lithuania (2019)

=== Foreign honours ===
- Albania: Member of the Order of Mother Teresa (2007)
- Armenia: Order of St. Mesrop Mashtots (2002)
- Austria: Grand Star of the Decoration for Services to the Republic of Austria (2009)
- Belgium: Grand Cordon of the Order of Leopold (2006)
- Bulgaria: First Class of the Order of Stara Planina (2009)
- Chile: Collar of the Order of the Merit of Chile (2008)
- Estonia:
  - Collar of the Order of the Cross of Terra Mariana (1999)
  - Collar of the Order of the White Star (2004)
- Finland: Grand Cross with Collar of the Order of the White Rose of Finland (2002)
- France: Grand Cross of the Legion of Honour (2001)
- Georgia: St. George's Victory Order (2007)
- Germany: Grand Cross Special Class of the Order of Merit of the Federal Republic of Germany (2005)
- Greece: Grand Cross of the Order of the Redeemer (1999)
- Hungary: Grand Cross of the Order of Merit of the Republic of Hungary (1999)
- Iceland: Grand Cross of the Order of the Falcon (1998)
- Italy: Knight Grand Cross with Collar of the Order of Merit of the Italian Republic (1999)
- Japan: Grand Cordon of the Supreme Order of the Chrysanthemum (2007)
- Kazakhstan: First Class of the Order of Friendship (2000)
- Latvia: Commander Grand Cross with Chain of the Order of Three Stars (2001)
- Malta: Grand Cross of the National Order of Merit (1999)
- Netherlands: Knight Grand Cross of the Order of the Netherlands Lion (2008)
- Norway: Grand Cross of the Order of St. Olav (1998)
- Poland:
  - Knight of the Order of the White Eagle (1999)
  - Grand Cross of the Order of Polonia Restituta (2009)
- Portugal: Grand Collar of the Order of Prince Henry (2007)
- Romania: Collar of the Order of the Star of Romania (2001)
- Slovakia: First Class of the Order of the White Double Cross (2005)
- Spain: Knight of the Collar of the Order of Isabella the Catholic (2005)
- Ukraine:
  - First Class of the Order of Prince Yaroslav the Wise (1998)
  - First Class of the Order of Merit (2006)
  - Order of Liberty (2009)
- United Kingdom: Honorary Knight Grand Cross of the Order of the Bath (2006)
- Uzbekistan: Order of Outstanding Merit (2002)

=== Other awards ===
- Europe: European of the Year (2007)
- Europe: Honorary Knight of the Order of Merit for Europe of the European Parliament (2026)
- Russia: St Andrew "Dialogue of Civilizations" prize (2002)
- United States:
  - EPA Gold Medal for Exceptional Service (1978)
  - Rachel Carson Award of the Lake Michigan Federation (1983)
  - International environmental award for outstanding achievement in the international arena (1988)
  - US president's highest award for managerial work in the federal civil service (1995)
  - Government environmental protection gold medal (1998)
  - Golden Plate Award of the American Academy of Achievement (1999)
  - Truman–Reagan Medal of Freedom of the Victims of Communism Memorial Foundation
- Honorary citizen of Kaunas (2006)

=== Honorary doctorates ===
Adamkus holds honorary doctorates from universities in Lithuania, the United States and other countries, including:

- Lithuania: Vilnius University (1989)
- USA: Saint Joseph's College, Indiana (1991)
- USA: Northwestern University (1994)
- Lithuania: Kaunas University of Technology (1998)
- USA: The Catholic University of America (1998)
- Lithuania: Lithuanian University of Agriculture (1999)
- USA: Illinois Institute of Technology (1999)
- Kazakhstan: Eurasian University, honorary professorship (2000)
- USA: DePaul University (2001)
- Lithuania: Law University of Lithuania (2001)
- Lithuania: Vytautas Magnus University (2001)
- Lithuania: Lithuanian Academy of Physical Education (2004)
- Armenia: Yerevan State University (2006)
- Azerbaijan: Baku State University (2006)
- Ukraine: Donetsk University (2006)
- USA: University of Notre Dame (2007)
- Poland: Nicolaus Copernicus University (2007)
- Estonia: Tallinn University (2008)
- Chile: University of Chile (2008)
- Lithuania: Klaipėda University (2008)
- Poland: John Paul II Catholic University (2009)
- Lithuania: ISM University of Management and Economics (2009)

== See also ==
- List of presidents of Lithuania
- Presidential Palace, Vilnius
- Historical Presidential Palace, Kaunas
- Knight of Freedom Award

Political offices
Preceded by Algirdas Brazauskas	President of Lithuania; 1998–2003	Succeeded by Rolandas Paksas
Preceded by Artūras Paulauskas; Acting	President of Lithuania; 2004–2009	Succeeded by Dalia Grybauskaitė
