= Algirdas Brazauskas =

Lithuanian politician (1932–2010)

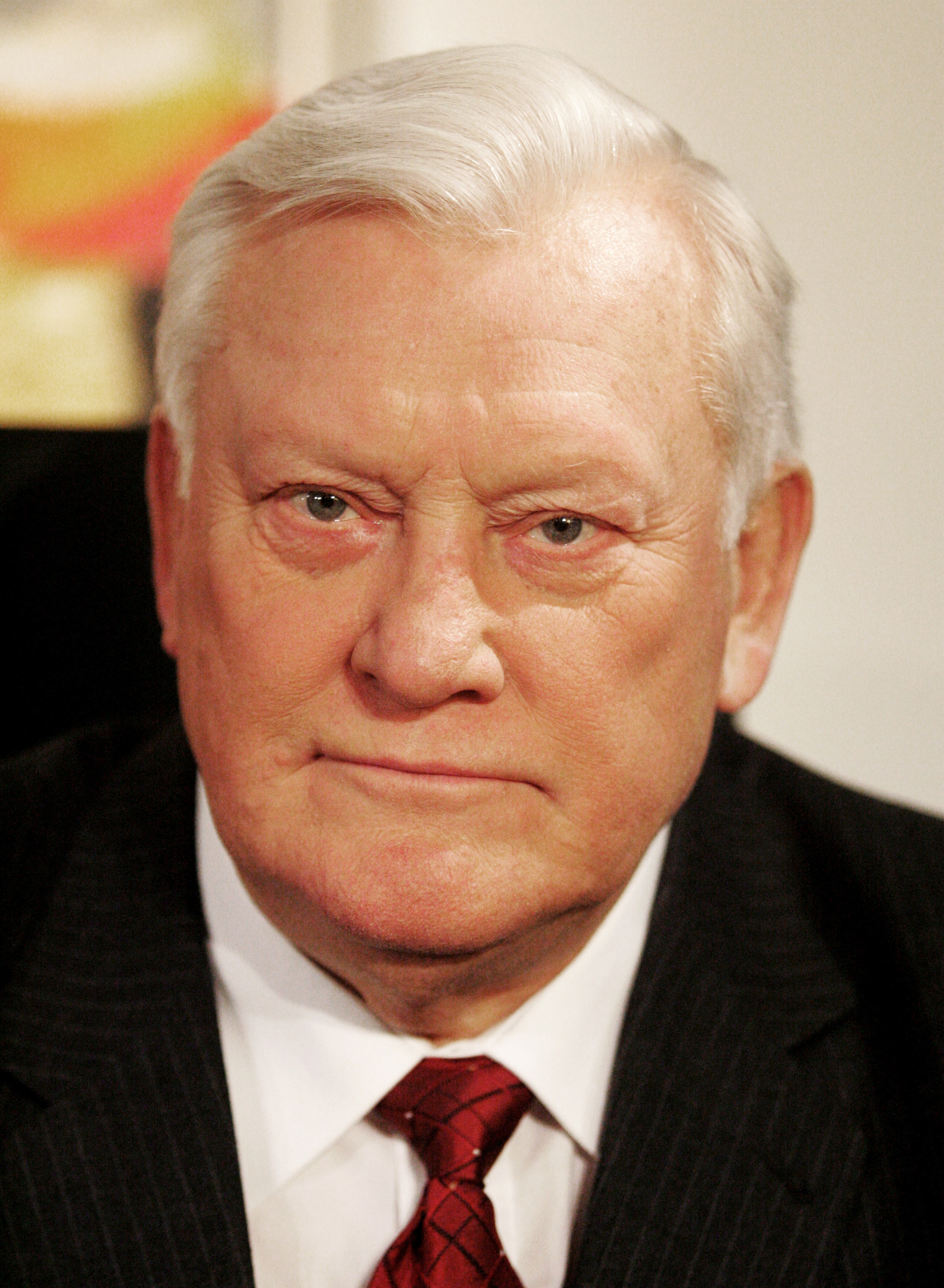
- Brazauskas in 2005

4th President of Lithuania
- In office 25 November 1992 – 25 February 1998; Acting: 25 November 1992 – 25 February 1993
- Preceded by: Vytautas Landsbergis (as Chairman of the Supreme Council of Lithuania)
- Succeeded by: Valdas Adamkus

12th Prime Minister of Lithuania
- In office 3 July 2001 – 1 June 2006
- President: Valdas Adamkus; Rolandas Paksas; Valdas Adamkus
- Preceded by: Eugenijus Gentvilas
- Succeeded by: Zigmantas Balčytis

Speaker of the Seimas
- In office 25 November 1992 – 25 February 1993
- Preceded by: Vytautas Landsbergis (as Chairman of the Supreme Council of Lithuania)
- Succeeded by: Česlovas Juršėnas

Deputy Prime Minister of Lithuania
- In office 17 March 1990 – 10 January 1991

Chairman of Presidium of the Supreme Soviet of Lithuanian SSR
- In office 15 January 1990 – 11 March 1990
- Preceded by: Vytautas Astrauskas
- Succeeded by: Vytautas Landsbergis (as Chairman of the Supreme Council of Lithuania)

First Secretary of Central Committee of the Communist Party of Lithuania
- In office 20 October 1988 – 19 December 1989
- Preceded by: Ringaudas Bronislovas Songaila
- Succeeded by: Mykolas Burokevičius

Personal details
- Born: Algirdas Mykolas Brazauskas; 22 September 1932 Rokiškis, Lithuania
- Died: 26 June 2010 (aged 77) Vilnius, Lithuania
- Party: Communist Party of Lithuania (1957–1990); Communist Party of the Soviet Union (1959–1989); Democratic Labour Party of Lithuania (1990–1993, 1998–2001); Independent (1993–1998, LDDP membership suspended while president); Social Democratic Party of Lithuania (2001–2010)
- Spouse(s): Julija Brazauskienė; Kristina Brazauskienė
- Children: 2 daughters (from first marriage)
- Education: Kaunas University of Technology (1956)

Military service
- Allegiance: Soviet Union
- Branch/service: Soviet Navy
- Years of service: 1956–1960
- Rank: Starshina 1st stage

Algirdas Mykolas Brazauskas (Note: Lithuanian pronunciation: [ˈɐ̂ˑlʲɡʲɪrdɐs ˈmʲîːkoːɫɐs brɐˈzɐ̂ˑʊskɐs]) (22 September 1932 – 26 June 2010) was the fourth president of Lithuania, in office from 1993 to 1998. He also served as Prime Minister of Lithuania from 2001 to 2006. Brazauskas was the first democratically elected president of post-Soviet Lithuania.

He also served as head of the Communist Party of Lithuania that broke with the Communist Party of the Soviet Union.

== Biography ==
Brazauskas was born in Rokiškis, Lithuania. Brazauskas traces his family's root back to the 18th century, in the village of Mikailiškiai (now in Radviliškis District Municipality). His father was Kazimieras Brazauskas (1906–1997) and mother was Sofija Brazauskienė (née Perezilevičiūtė; 1904–1979). He finished Kaišiadorys High School in 1952 and graduated from Kaunas Polytechnic Institute in 1956 with a degree in civil engineering. He later served as a Conscript sailor in the Soviet Navy, serving as a Fire controlman on board the Riga-class frigate Rosomakha until 1960. In 1967, Brazauskas started working in the Governmental Planning Committee, as a Committee's head's assistant. In 1974, Brazauskas received a PhD in economics.

He divorced his first wife, Julija, with whom he had two daughters; he married Kristina Butrimienė in 2002.

== Political career ==
=== In the Lithuanian SSR and early independent Lithuania ===
Brazauskas held various positions in the government of Lithuanian SSR and Communist Party of Lithuania from 1965 onwards:

- 1965–1967, the minister of construction materials industry of Lithuanian SSR
- 1967–1977, deputy chairman of State Planning Committee of Lithuanian SSR.
- 1977–1987, secretary of Central Committee of Communist Party of Lithuania.

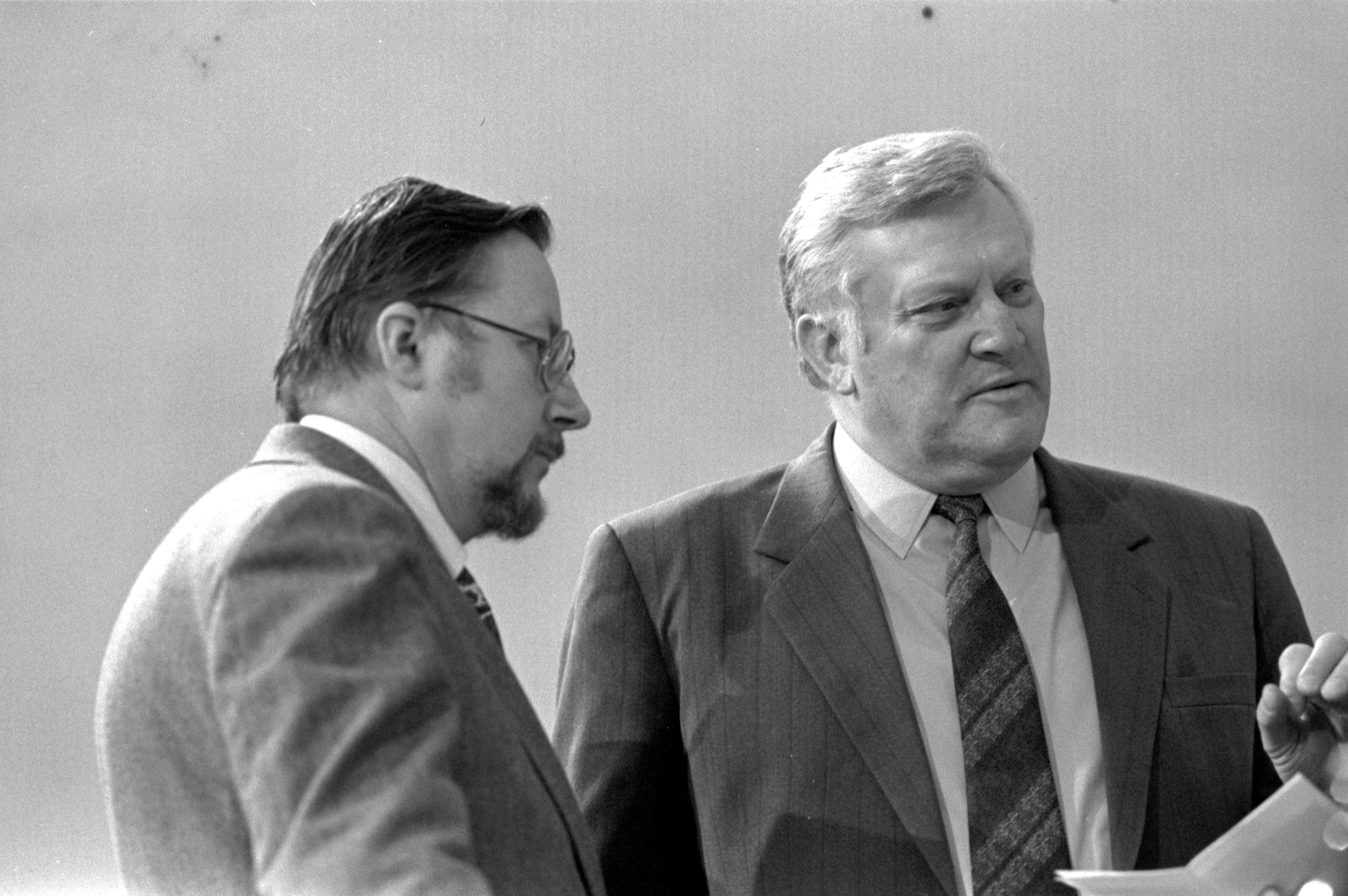
Vytautas Landsbergis and Algirdas Brazauskas in March 1990

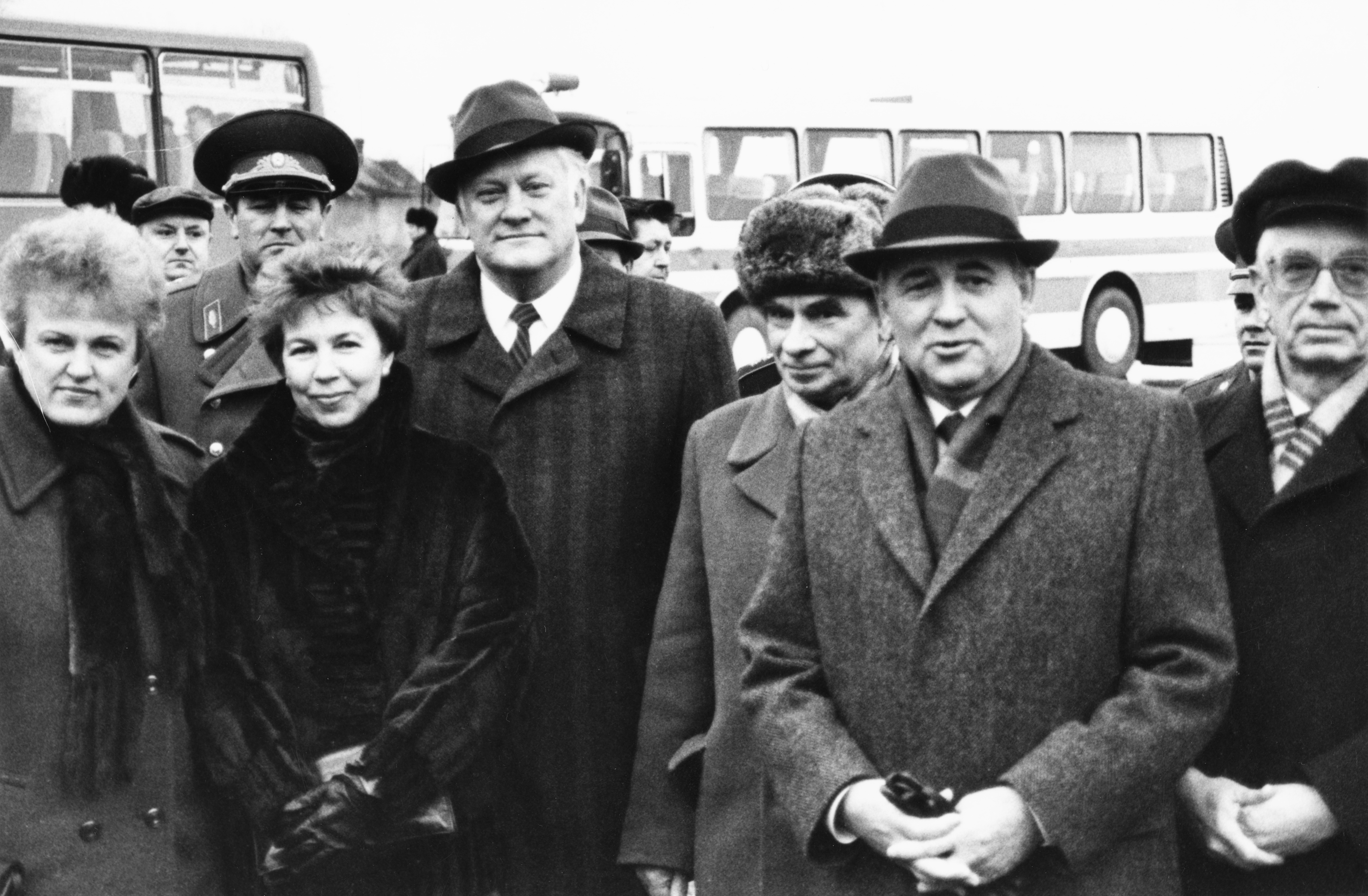
Brazauskas standing near the Soviet leader Mikhail Gorbachev during Gorbachev's 1990 visit to Lithuania

In the 1980s, he transformed himself from a Communist Party apparatchik to a moderate reformer. He was seen as cautious by nature, and when confronted by the tide of nationalist feeling in the Soviet Union, Brazauskas initially believed that the USSR might be reconstituted as a looser federation of independent, but communist, states. In seeing the tide of an independent democracy, he joined the reformist cause observing in 1990 that "We are realists now, and we cannot be propagating any utopian ideas. It's no secret [that] the Communist Party has a dirty history."

In 1988, he became the first secretary of the Communist Party of Lithuania. Under his leadership, the majority of the Communist Party of Lithuania supported the Lithuanian independence movement, broke away from the Communist Party of the Soviet Union and transformed itself into social-democratic Democratic Labour Party of Lithuania (now merged into the Lithuanian Social Democratic Party). Brazauskas was Chairman of the Presidium of the Supreme Soviet (head of state) from 15 January until 11 March 1990. In January 1990, he accompanied the Soviet leader Mikhail Gorbachev during his official visit to the Lithuanian SSR who attempted to mitigate Lithuania's requests for independence, shortly before Lithuania declared independence from the Soviet Union on March 11, 1990.

Though he sought to avoid a breach with Moscow in 1989, as leader of Lithuania's Communist Party, he formally severed the party's links with Moscow. This was rare in that no other local communist party organizations in the former Soviet Union dared to take this step. Some historians and journalists have later suggested that this act was the earliest certain indication of the inevitability of the demise of the Soviet Union.

After the 1992 parliamentary elections, the first since 1938, he became speaker of Seimas and acting President of Lithuania on 25 November 1992. He then won the presidential election in a single round with 60 percent of the vote and was confirmed as president on 25 February 1993. He immediately suspended his membership in the Democratic Labour Party; the Constitution does not allow the president to be a formal member of a political party during his tenure.

=== President of Lithuania ===
Brazauskas standing near Bill Clinton, the first incumbent President of the United States to visit the Baltic states, in Riga, 1994

Brazauskas 1994 visit to Jacques Delors, President of the European Commission

Political scientist and diplomat Laimonas Tallat-Kelpša described Brazauskas's presidency as an "ambusher regime". Though he was elected with the backing of his political party, the Democratic Labour Party, he attempted to stay within the limitations of constitutional powers and avoid direct intervention in politics - except in moments of crisis, when he would "leave his ambush" and demand actions from the elected government.

He proposed Democratic Labour Party politician Adolfas Šleževičius as Prime Minister, who formed the Šleževičius Cabinet, but avoided interference in cabinet choices and allowed Šleževičius to form his cabinet. By 1994, the president's relations with his party's cabinet had turned cold, and Brazauskas stated that he "could not agree [with him] on the simplest things". In late 1995, Šleževičius entered a scandal regarding his actions during the collapse of the Lithuanian bank Lietuvos akcinis inovacinis bankas - the prime minister withdrew his assets from the bank a day before it stopped its activities. After the Democratic Labour Party's central committee expressed their continued confidence in him, Brazauskas suddenly demanded his resignation, which prompted parts of the LDDP, alongside the opposition, to force him to resign after a vote of no confidence.

Brazauskas supported Lithuania's accession to NATO and the European Union, though he was initially sceptical towards the United States and membership in NATO, and described Homeland Union proposals of demanding reparations from Russia to be "the politics of a hunched hedgehog". He supported pragmatic relations with Russia. However, he played an important part in the early 1993 diplomatic crisis with Russia, in which Russia suspended negotiations on the withdrawal of Russian troops from Lithuania. After a personal phone call with Russian president Boris Yeltsin, negotiations were renewed and the withdrawal was completed.

In 1995, speaking before the Knesset, Brazauskas officially apologized for the Lithuanian people's actions during the Holocaust.

In spite of high approval ratings, he decided not to seek reelection, endorsed Artūras Paulauskas presidential campaign and later handed the presidency to his democratically elected successor, Valdas Adamkus, on 25 February 1998.

=== Retirement and return to politics ===
Brazauskas with other leaders of the European Union in 2004 signing the Treaty establishing a Constitution for Europe

Brazauskas said he planned to retire from politics and wanted to be "an ordinary pensioner." During the first two years in retirement he wrote a book, though it was incomplete. He said he would continue writing it after his second stint in government. He also said he would finish "household work" and that he likes physical work. He added that "I have no estates, but the property I own needs to be put in good order." He wanted to live "in a way that other people live."

He subsequently returned to politics saying he "always had something to do in life." He was Prime Minister from 3 July 2001, appointed by the parliament, until 1 June 2006, when his government resigned as President Valdas Adamkus expressed no confidence in two of the ministers, former Labour Party colleagues of Brazauskas, over ethical principles.

His government resigned on 31 May 2006 after the Labour Party left the governing coalition. Brazauskas decided not to remain in office as acting Prime Minister, and announced that he was finally retiring from politics. He said "I tried to be a pensioner for several years, and I think I was successful. I hope for success this time, as well."

He led the ruling Social Democratic Party of Lithuania for one more year, until 19 May 2007, when he passed the reins to Gediminas Kirkilas. He served as the honorary chairman of the party, and remained an influential voice in party politics.

== Honours ==
Algirdas Brazauskas was honored with the various decorations, among others the Order of Vytautas the Great with the Golden Chain, Grand Cross Order of Vytautas the Great. Days before his death Russian president Dmitry Medvedev awarded Brazauskas with the Order of Honour for his significant contribution to cooperation between Russia and Lithuania and good neighborly relations. Brazauskas was also an honorary member of the International Raoul Wallenberg Foundation.

== Illness and death ==
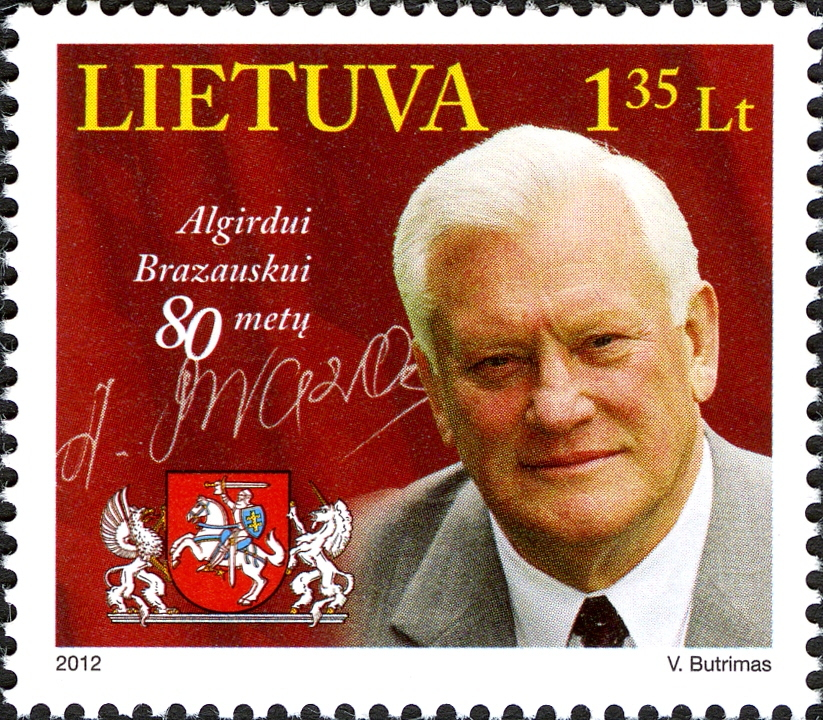
Commemorative Lithuanian Post stamp (2012)

Brazauskas was diagnosed with lymphatic cancer in December 2008. He died on 26 June 2010 from cancer, aged 77. At the time of his death, he was still considered an influential figure in Lithuanian politics.

Following his death the obituaries wrote of him that he had a "frame to match his indefatigable stature and a calm but commanding presence that could fill any stage." His successor as president, Valdas Adamkus, said that he "dared to decide which side to choose in a critical moment."

Lithuanian president Dalia Grybauskaitė said "The memory of the first directly elected president of Lithuania after it restored its independence, of a strong and charismatic personality, will remain for a long time in the hearts of the Lithuanian people."

Political offices
Preceded by Vytautas Landsbergis (as Chairman of the Supreme Council)	Speaker of the Seimas and Acting President; 1992–1993	Succeeded by Česlovas Juršėnas (as Speaker); Himself (as President)
Preceded by Himself as Speaker of the Seimas and Acting President	President of Lithuania; 1992-1998	Succeeded by Valdas Adamkus
Preceded by Eugenijus Gentvilas	Prime Minister of Lithuania; 2001–2006	Succeeded by Zigmantas Balčytis
