= Artūras Paulauskas =

Lithuanian politician (born 1953)

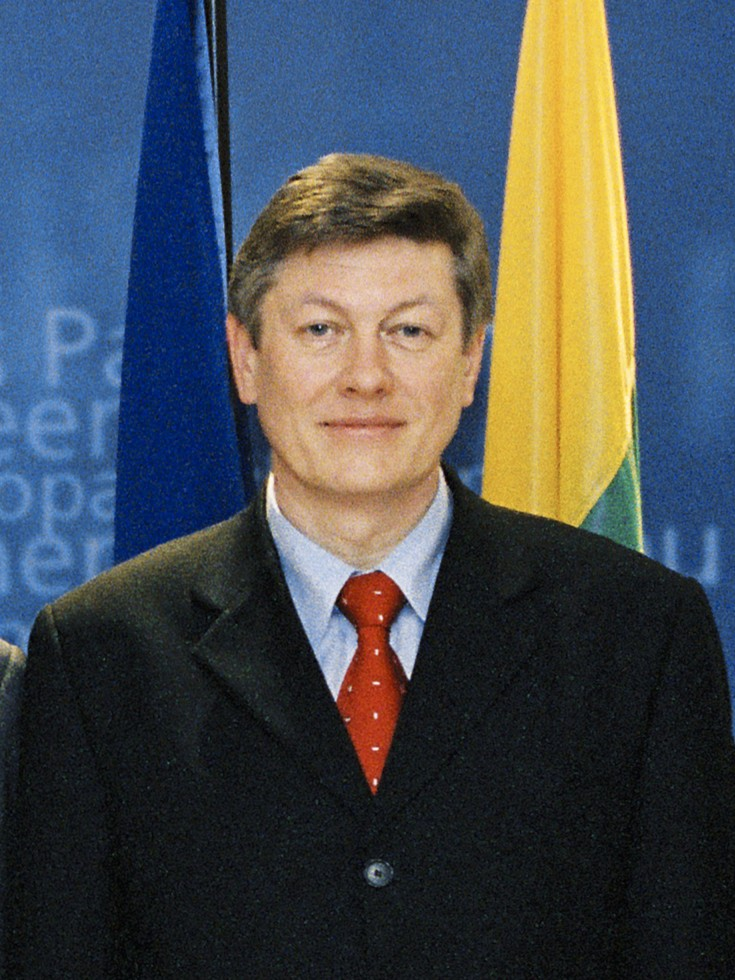
- Paulauskas in 2003

Acting President of Lithuania
- In office 6 April 2004 – 12 July 2004
- Prime Minister: Algirdas Brazauskas
- Preceded by: Rolandas Paksas
- Succeeded by: Valdas Adamkus

Minister of the Environment
- In office 31 January 2008 – 9 December 2008
- Prime Minister: Gediminas Kirkilas
- Preceded by: Arūnas Kundrotas
- Succeeded by: Gediminas Kazlauskas

Speaker of the Seimas
- In office 19 October 2000 – 11 April 2006
- Preceded by: Vytautas Landsbergis
- Succeeded by: Vydas Gedvilas (acting)

Personal details
- Born: 23 August 1953 (age 73) Vilnius, then part of Lithuanian SSR, Soviet Union
- Party: Freedom and Justice (since 2020)
- Other political affiliations: Communist Party (1981–1989); Independent (1989–98); New Union (1998–2011); Labour Party (2011–2017)
- Spouse: Jolanta Paulauskienė
- Education: Vilnius University

Artūras Paulauskas (Note: Lithuanian pronunciation: [ɐrˈtuːrɐs pɐʊˈɫɐ̂ˑʊskɐs]) (born 23 August 1953) is a Lithuanian politician who was Speaker of Seimas, the parliament of Lithuania, from 2000 to 2006. He served as acting President of Lithuania from 6 April to 12 July 2004.

== Early career ==
Artūras Paulauskas graduated from Vilnius University with a degree in law in 1976. He then worked as an investigator and a prosecutor. He was Deputy Prosecutor General of Lithuania from 1987 to 1990 and Prosecutor General of Lithuania from 1990 to 1995. He was again Deputy Prosecutor General from 1995 to 1997 and was engaged in private legal practice from 1997 to 2000.

== Political career ==
Artūras Paulauskas entered politics by running for President of Lithuania in the 1997–1998 elections. He was supported by outgoing President Algirdas Brazauskas and narrowly lost in the runoff to Valdas Adamkus, with Paulauskas gaining 49.6% of the vote and Adamkus gaining 50.4%. He then established The New Union (Social Liberals) party, becoming its chairman on 25 April 1998. This party gained 19.6% of the vote in the 2000 parliamentary election. Following this election, he became the Speaker of Seimas on 19 October 2000.

Following the impeachment of President Rolandas Paksas on 6 April 2004, Paulauskas served as acting President of Lithuania until early elections were held and a new president, Valdas Adamkus, was sworn on 12 July 2004.

On 11 April 2006, Paulauskas was removed from office as Speaker by 94 votes (only 11 parliamentarians voted against it). His party New Union (Social Liberals) did not participate in the election. Paulauskas was succeeded by Viktoras Muntianas.

Paulauskas was named as the candidate for the post of Minister of Environment by Prime Minister Gediminas Kirkilas on 30 January 2008. As Minister, he made a May 2008 statement at a meeting of the United Nations Commission on Sustainable Development supporting the use of renewable energy resources in Lithuania.

In 2015, news media reported that Paulauskas was included in a Russian blacklist of prominent people from the European Union who are not allowed to enter the country.

In August 2015, Paulauskas called for a Burqa Ban in Lithuania.

Political offices
Preceded by Vytautas Landsbergis	Speaker of the Seimas; 2000–2006	Succeeded by Vydas Gedvilas; Acting
Preceded by Rolandas Paksas	President of Lithuania; Acting; 2004	Succeeded by Valdas Adamkus
Preceded by Arūnas Kundrotas	Minister of Environment; 2008	Succeeded by Gediminas Kazlauskas
