= Gintautas Šulija =

Lithuanian lawyer

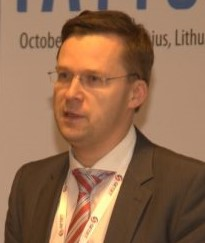
Gintautas Šulija, 2016

Gintautas Šulija (born 2 August 1978 in Vilnius) is a Lithuanian business lawyer and legal scholar. He holds a Doctor of Law (Dr. jur.), PhD with post-graduation (LL.M.) and the title of associate professor at the Faculty of Law of Kazimieras Simonavičius University. He is a co-author of the commentary of the Lithuanian Criminal Code (2000) and co-founder and managing partner of Šulija Partners Law Firm Vilnius.

== Education ==
In 2001 Gintautas Šulija graduated from Vilnius University, the Faculty of Law. As from 2001 he was enrolled as a doctoral student and obtained a PhD in social sciences, for the thesis in criminal law.

In 2004 Šulija was awarded an LL.M. (magna cum laude) from Goethe University Frankfurt in Germany. Between 2006 and 2007 Gintautas Šulija studied at the Faculty of Law of the University of Cambridge, Corpus Christi College and graduated with an LL.M.

Having received a scholarship from the German Academic Exchange Service (DAAD), he worked on the dissertation Standard Contract Terms in Cross-Border Business Transactions under the supervision of Prof. Dr. Marina Wellenhofer. Šulija was awarded a summa cum laude degree (Dr. jur.) from the Faculty of Law of Goethe University Frankfurt in 2010.

His research interests are aviation law, trade law, European private law, and financial law.

Gintautas Šulija attended Gustav Stresemann Institute, Jean Monnet regional center in Bonn and several European universities — University of Kiel in Germany, University of Lund in Sweden, Institute of Human Rights of Åbo Akademi University in Finland.

== Law science and pedagogy ==
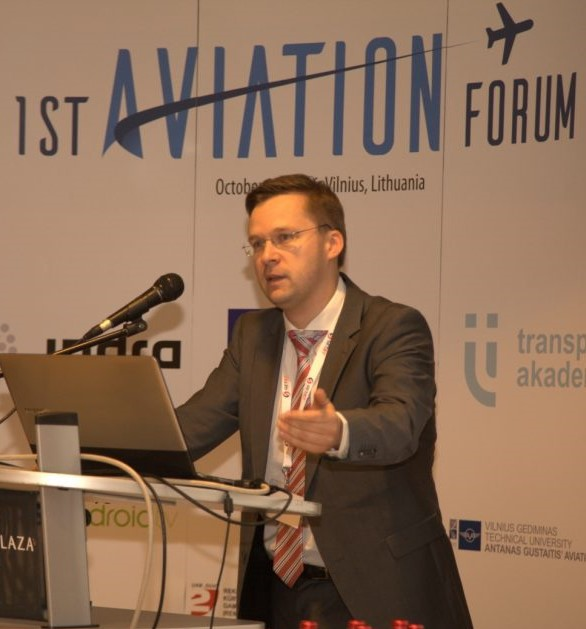
Gintautas Šulija gives a speech on "Doing Aviation Business in Lithuania" at the International Aviation Forum, 2016

From 1999 to 2002 Gintautas Šulija was a specialist at Law Institute of Lithuania in Vilnius. From 2008 he was a tutor and lecturer in commercial law at universities and colleges (ISM, TTVAM, etc.) for Lithuanian and foreign students in Lithuania. Šulija is an associate professor, member of the Faculty Council and a social partner of the Faculty of Law of Kazimieras Simonavičius University.

From 2012 to 2013 Šulija was a research fellow of the legal system department of the Law Institute of Lithuania. In 2013 he was a chairman of the commission "My Europe. My Rights" for law students in Lithuania. He is an honorary member of Law Students society "Kriterijus" of Kazimieras Simonavičius University.

Šulija was a co-author of commentary of the Criminal code of the Republic of Lithuania (with professors Vladas Pavilonis and Jonas Prapiestis, Gintaras Švedas and others). He compiled and published a number of articles in Lithuanian law reviews and legal journals: Teisė (Vilnius University), Teisės problemos (Law Institute of Lithuania), Jurisprudencija (Mykolas Romeris University).

He has cooperated with other publishers (Peter Lang International Academic, Oxford University Press, Lincoln Institute of Land Policy).

== Law practice ==
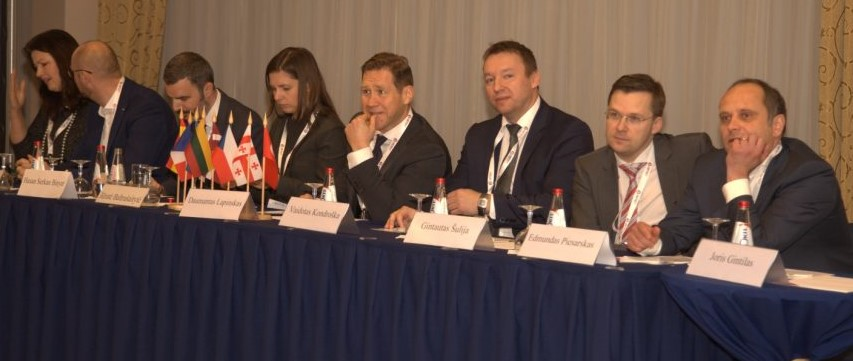
Gintautas Šulija (second from the right) with other participants of the panel discussion at the International Aviation Forum 2016 in Vilnius

From 2002 to 2004 Gintautas Šulija worked at the law firm Lideika, Petrauskas, Valiūnas ir partneriai, since September 2003 as a qualified attorney at law. In 2007 and 2008 he worked as a contract attorney for the international law firm Fried, Frank, Harris, Shriver & Jacobson (London office).

In October 2008 Šulija founded a law firm — Šulija & Partners (currently "Šulija Partners Law Firm Vilnius") — that specialised in aviation finance, business and corporate law. Currently he heads corporate and mergers and acquisitions and commercial practices of the firm. He is recommended by the Who is Who Legal 100 (editions 2014, 2015, 2016) Aviation Finance, The Legal 500 EMEA 2016 and other legal directories. In 2016, he was listed as a leading Lithuanian lawyer in the shipping and transport area of EMEA Legal 500.

Šulija is a lecturer of legal seminars by business consulting organisations and companies ("Mokesčių srautas", "Teisės ir valdymo institutas" etc.). He provides comments to the Lithuanian press and newspapers (Lietuvos rytas etc.). On 25 October 2016 Šulija participated in the panel discussion of the International Aviation Forum as an aviation law expert and delivered a speech on the topic "Doing Aviation Business in Lithuania: Challenges and Pitfalls."

== Bibliography ==
- Baudos bausmė ir jos skyrimas (doctoral dissertation): social science, law (01 S); Vilnius University. Vilnius: [s.n.], 2005. 170 p.: iliustr., lent. UDK: 343.244(043.3); UDK: 331.109(474.5)(043.3).
- Standard Contract Terms in Cross-Border Business Transactions. A Comparative Study from the Perspective of European Union Law. Frankfurt am Main, Berlin, Bern, Bruxelles, New York, Oxford, Wien, 2011. XXXIV, 262 pp. ISBN 978-3-631-60343-7 hb. (Hardcover)
- Commentary of Lithuanian Criminal Code. 1 t., 1-98 str. (with Armanas Abramavičius, Agne Baranskaite, Algimantas Čepas, Romualdas Drakšas, Anna Drakšiene, Oleg Fedosiuk, Girius Ivoška, Antanas Jatkevičius, Albertas Milinis, Vytas Milius, Vladas Pavilonis, Jonas Prapiestis, Deividas Soloveičikas, Gintaras Švedas. Editor-in-chief Jonas Prapiestis. LR baudžiamojo kodekso komentaras I dalis. Teisinės informacijos centras, 2004 (Vilnius: Vilniaus spauda). 565 psl. ISBN kodas: 7555752.
- Baudžiamoji atsakomybė už intelektinės nuosavybės teisių pažeidimus Europos valstybėse / Mindaugas Kiškis, Gintautas Šulija. In: Teisė. 2003, t. 49, p. 52-65. Text in Lithuanian, Summary in English.
- Malinauskaitė J., Šulija G., Šulija V. Kontrabanda: kontrolė ir prevencija Lietuvoje. Vilnius: Cust department at Ministry of Finance of Lithuania, Law Institute of Lithuania, 2002.
- Concept of freedom of contract and its application in large international aviation business transactions // Sutarties laisvės principas ir jo taikymo ribos: analizė tarptautinių aviacijos sandorių pavyzdžiu. Law Institute of Lithuania, ISSN 1392-1592, "Teisės problemos", Nr. 4 (78), 2012, pp. 26–48
- Unfair Suretyships in Lithuania (pp. 401–415) // Regulating Unfair Banking Practices in Europe: the Case of Personal Suretyships, Weatherill S., Ciacchi A. (eds.) Oxford University Press 2010 (co-author)
- Reform of the Property Tax and Problems of Real Estate Appraisal for Taxation Purposes in Transitional Economies of Central and Eastern Europe // the Lincoln Institute of Land Policy, Cambridge, MA 2138-3400 USA, January 2006 (co-author)
- Concept of Corporate Criminal Liability and Problems of its Application in Lithuania // Mykolas Romeris University Law Review "Jurisprudencija", No. 41 (33), 2003, p. 91-105 (co-author)
- Juridinių asmenų baudžiamosios atsakomybės samprata ir taikymo problemos Lietuvoje. Jurisprudencija, [S.l.], v. 41, n. 33, p. 91-105, Rgp. 2014. ISSN 2029-2058 (co-author)
- Reform of the Property tax and Problems of Real Estate Appraisal for Taxation Purposes in Transitional Economies of Central and Eastern Europe (co-author)
- Komercinių ginčų sprendimas Anglijos teismuose // Magazine "Valstybė", Nr. 9 (53), 2011, 64-67 pp.

== Literature ==
- Gintautas Šulija (Biography) // Vytautas Andriulis, Aldona Bentkuvienė. Work bibliography of scientists at Law Institute of Lithuania. Ministry of Justice of Lithuania, 2002, Vilnius, 153.
