= Dainius Žalimas =

Lithuanian judge and politician

Dainius Žalimas MEP
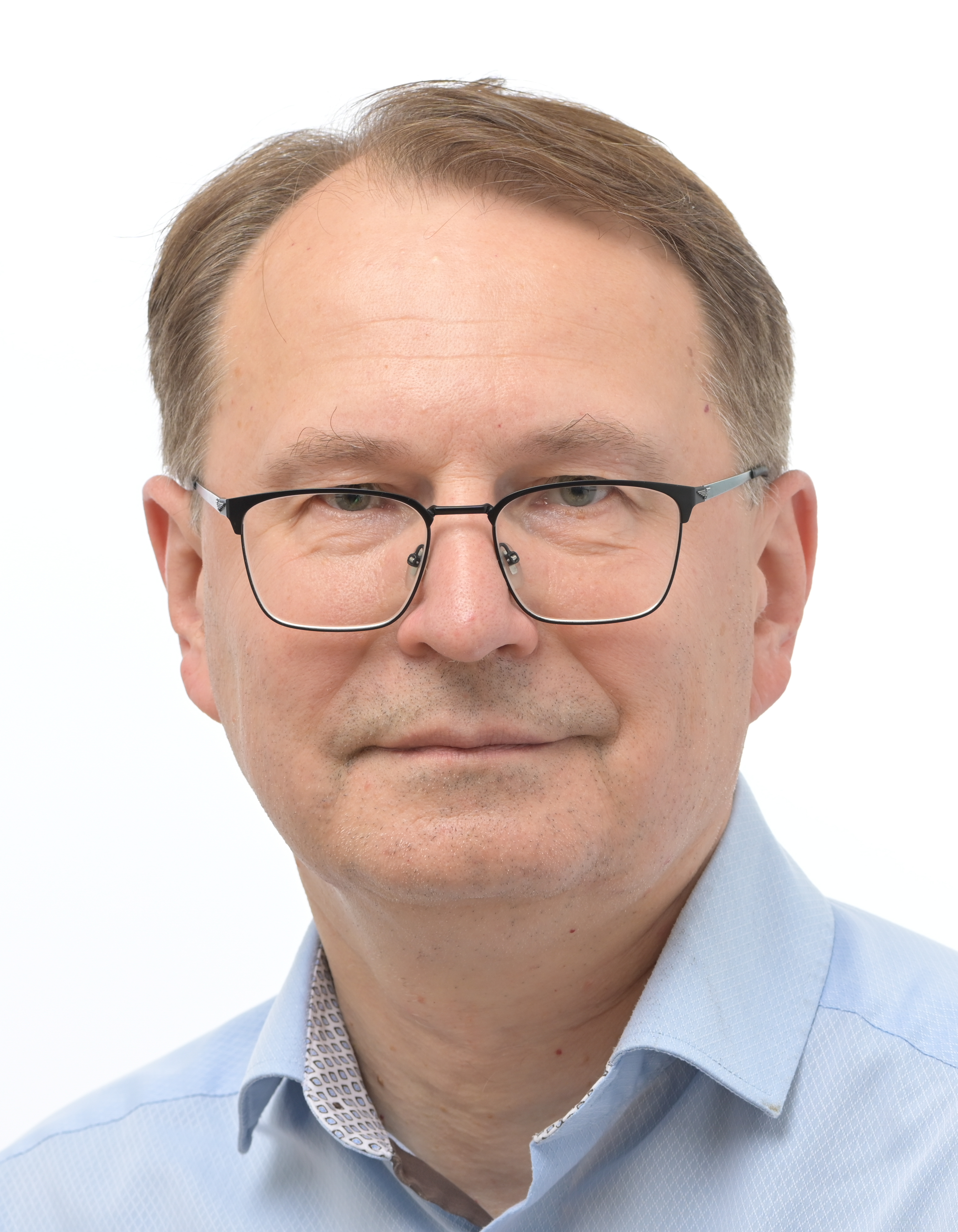

Member of the European Parliament for Lithuania
- Incumbent
- Assumed office 16 July 2024

Chairman of the Constitutional Court of Lithuania
- In office 10 July 2014 – 9 June 2021
- Preceded by: Romualdas Kęstutis Urbaitis
- Succeeded by: Danutė Jočienė

Member of the Constitutional Court of Lithuania
- In office 15 March 2011 – 9 June 2021

Personal details
- Born: 22 May 1973 (age 53) Vilnius, Lithuanian SSR, Soviet Union (now Vilnius, Lithuania)
- Party: Homeland Union (1995-2001); Independent (since 2001); Freedom Party (Lithuania)
- Education: Vilnius University
- Website: https://www.dainiuszalimas.lt

Dainius Žalimas (born 22 May 1973) is a Lithuanian lawyer, jurist and politician who served as the chairman of the Constitutional Court of Lithuania from 2014 to 2021. He was the candidate of the Freedom Party in the 2024 Lithuanian presidential election. In the 2024 European Parliament election he won a seat for the Freedom Party.

== Biography ==
Žalimas was born in Vilnius on 22 May 1973 and enrolled in Vilnius University in 1991. He finished with a degree in international law in 1996 and received a Doctor of Social Science degree in 2001. His thesis supervisor was Vilenas Vadapalas, later the first Lithuanian representative in the General Court of the European Union.

Since 1996, he worked as a public servant and continued his research and pedagogical work in Vilnius University. From 1998 to 2011, he was a legal advisor to the Ministry of National Defence, and he was a lecturer on European and international law in Vilnius University, Mykolas Romeris University and the General Jonas Žemaitis Military Academy. In addition, he is an author or co-author of 6 books and over 70 scientific articles. As advisor to Minister of National Defence Gediminas Kirkilas, he contributed to drafting the legal base required after Lithuania's accession to NATO.

He was put forward as a candidate to the Constitutional Court by Speaker Irena Degutienė, representing the Homeland Union, on 10 December 2010. He was approved on 15 March 2011. From 2011 to 2017, he also served as one of three Lithuanian representatives in the Permanent Court of Arbitration in The Hague, Netherlands. On 10 July 2014, proposed by President Dalia Grybauskaitė and approved by the Seimas, Žalimas was appointed as the chairman of the Constitutional Court.

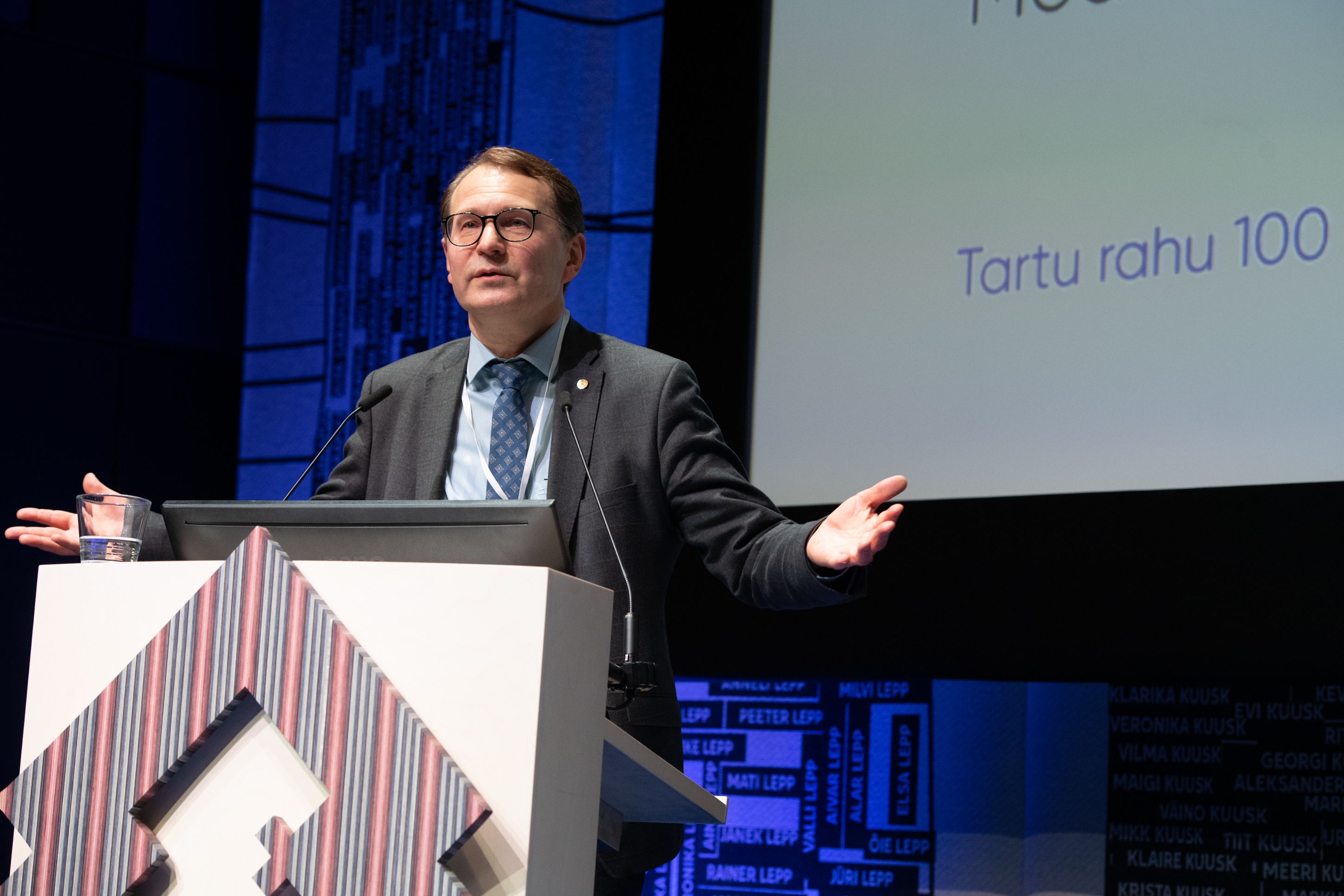
Žalimas in a conference in Tartu in 2020

Žalimas's chairmanship was notable for the 2019 Constitutional Court ruling that same-sex marriages registered in the European Union can be recognized for residency purposes, and he expressed the belief that the Constitution of Lithuania should not allow discrimination by gender identity or sexual orientation. His term continued until 2021, when he was replaced by Danutė Jočienė.

Married, wife – Ingrida Danėlė-Žalimienė, a lawyer, Head of the Department of Social Sciences at the European Humanities University, Doctor of Social (Law) Sciences, Associate Professor, and former Chancellor (Secretary General) of the Constitutional Court.

== Political career ==
Žalimas was a member of the Homeland Union from 1995 to 2001. From 2001 to 2003, he was a member of the city council of Vilnius. In the 2009 European Parliament election in Lithuania, he ran on the Homeland Union list.

Since his retirement from the Constitutional Court, he has remained active as a political commentator, and has expressed his support for Ukraine during the Russian invasion of Ukraine, endorsed same-sex partnerships, and criticized the use of migrant pushbacks during the Belarus-European Union border crisis. He criticized Ignas Vėgėlė for his sceptical position towards restrictions during the COVID-19 pandemic in Lithuania.

On 14 November 2023, he announced his intention to run for president with the support of the Freedom Party.

He expressed his support for the "yes" vote in the 2024 Lithuanian constitutional referendum on permitting multiple citizenship.
