= Egidijus Kūris =

Lithuanian judge, professor, and PhD in law

Egidijus Kūris (born 1961 in Vilnius, Lithuania) is a Lithuanian judge, professor and PhD in law. He is the former President of the Constitutional Court of the Republic of Lithuania and currently serving as a representative justice for Lithuania to the European Court of Human Rights.

Egidijus Kūris graduated from the Faculty of Law in Vilnius University in 1984, where he continued to work as a lecturer until 1994. Egidijus Kūris defended his doctoral thesis in 1988.

After Lithuania regained independence, Kūris worked on the preparation of the Constitution of Lithuania, which was adopted in 1992 after the referendum. During the same year, Egidijus Kūris became the Director of the Institute of International Relations and Political Science at Vilnius University. He held this position until 1999.

From 1993 till 1997 he also worked as an Assistant to the President of the Constitutional Court of the Republic of Lithuania. Egidijus Kūris became a Justice of the Constitutional Court in 1999 and the President of the Constitutional Court in 2002. He was in this position until March 21, 2008 when he was replaced by Kęstutis Lapinskas.

Egidijus Kūris' father, Pranas Kūris, served as the first Lithuanian representative to both the European Court of Justice and the European Court of Human Rights.

Egidijus Kūris is currently serving as the Lithuanian justice to the European Court of Human Rights in Strasbourg, succeeding Danutė Jočienė on November 1, 2013.

== Recent publications ==
- Judges as Guardians of the Constitution: "Strict" or "Liberal" Interpretation, in E. Smith (ed.). Old and New Constitutions: The Constitution as Instrument of Change. Stockholm: SNS Förlag, 2003.
- The Constitutional Court of Lithuania and the Death Penalty, in Revue de justice constitutionelle est-européene, 2003, numéro spécial.
- Constitutional Justice in Lithuania. Vilnius: The Constitutional Court of the Republic of Lithuania, 2003.
- Konstitucijos aiškinimas, konstitucinės teisės šaltiniai ir besikeičianti konstitucinės teisės paradigma, in Teisės problemos, 2003, Nr. 3.
- Limits of the Realization of the Human Rights in the Jurisprudence of the Constitutional Court of the *Republic of Lithuania, in G. Harutyunyan (ed.). Constitutional Justice in the New Millennium. Yerevan, 2003.

== Public activities ==
He was a co-founder and member of the President Algirdas Brazauskas Foundation from 1998 to 2008. He also co-founded the Lithuanian Human Rights Centre in 1994.

From 1993 to 1995 he was a member of the Board of the Higher Education Support Program of the Open Society Fund–Lithuania. He was also a member of its co-ordination council from 1994 to 1998. Finally from 1999 to 2003, he was an expert in the book publishing program of the Open Society Fund-Lithuania. According to an NGO report, this could be an element that put in question its impartiality in some cases.

As a member of the Lithuanian Political Science Association, he was elected President from 1995 to 1998 and a member of the board from 1995 to 2001.

== See also ==
- Law of Lithuania
