= Law of Lithuania =

Lithuanian law is a part of the legal system of Lithuania. It belongs to the civil law legal system, as opposed to the common law legal system. The legal system of Lithuania is based on epitomes of the French and German systems. The Lithuanian legal system is grounded on the principles laid out in the Constitution of the Republic of Lithuania and safeguarded by the Constitutional Court of the Republic of Lithuania.

== History ==
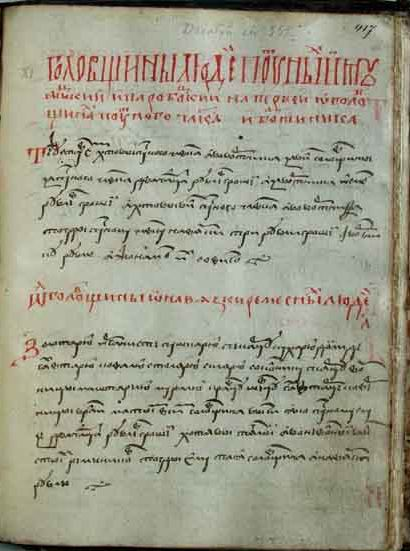
The First Statute of Lithuania, 1529

The origins of Lithuanian law trace back to the first written source, the Casimir Code (Lithuanian: Kazimiero teisynas), published in 1468 by the Grand Duke of Lithuania Casimir Jagiellon with the Lithuanian Council of Lords. It is considered to be the first codified law of the Grand Duchy of Lithuania. Statutes of Lithuania, published three times (in 1529, 1566 and 1588) were the most influent legal codes of Lithuania. The third variant of the Statute was in force in the territory of Lithuania until 1840 when it got replaced by the Russian laws. However, under the rule of the Russian Empire, there were three separate civil law systems in force in Lithuania: in Suvalkija the Napoleonic Code was still applied, whereas the German law was in force in Klaipėda Region.

The legal system of independent Lithuania between the World Wars was influenced by the fact that three separate systems of civil law governed various parts of the country, while the autonomous Klaipėda Region had its own legal instruments. The notable difference from the rest of the state was the possibility of a secular civil marriage in the 1930s and 1940s. The drafting of Lithuanian legal codes went on for decades and was not completed until World War II. During the Soviet occupation, the adapted variation of the Soviet law was in force in Lithuania.

After regaining of independence in 1990, the largely modified Soviet legal codes were in force for about a decade. The modern Constitution of Lithuania was adopted on 25 October 1992. In 2001 the Civil Code of Lithuania was passed in Seimas. It was succeeded by the Criminal Code and Criminal Procedure Code in 2003. The approach to the criminal law is inquisitorial, as opposed to adversarial; it is generally characterised by an insistence on formality and rationalisation, as opposed to practicality and informality.

== Civil and commercial law ==
The civil law and commercial law is codified in a single legal act - the Civil Code of the Republic of Lithuania (Lithuanian: Lietuvos Respublikos civilinis kodeksas) which is in force since 1 July 2001. It is influenced by the civil codes of Quebec and the Netherlands. The commercial law in Lithuania is of an increasingly excellent drafting quality and the market in Lithuanian legal services is now increasingly competitive.

== Legal science ==
Legal professionals are prepared and the law is researched in departments of three universities of Lithuania:

- Law Faculty of Vilnius University, the oldest, established in 1641 - M.A., LL.D.;
- Law Faculty of Mykolas Romeris University - B.A., M.A., LL.M., LL.D.;
- Law School of Vytautas Magnus University - LL.M.

== Lawyers ==
=== International judges ===
- Egidijus Bieliūnas - a member of the European Commission on Human Rights;
- Danutė Jočienė - the first female judge from Lithuania at the European Court of Human Rights and a Docent at Vilnius University;
- Pranas Kūris - a judge at the European Court of Justice;
- Mykolas Romeris - a progenitor of the Lithuanian Constitutional law school, judge at the Hague Tribunal;
- Vilenas Vadapalas - a judge at the Court of First Instance.

=== Prominent lawyers in Lithuania ===
- Vytautas Greičius - chairman of the Supreme Court of the Republic of Lithuania
- Kęstutis Lapinskas - chairman of the Constitutional Court of the Republic of Lithuania
- Valentinas Mikelėnas - a former justice at the Supreme Court of Lithuania and a most prominent Lithuanian civil law scholar to date
- Vytautas Milius - chairman of the Court of Appeal of Lithuania
- Stanisław Narutowicz - a signatory of the Act of Independence of Lithuania
- Artūras Paulauskas - a former chairman of the Parliament of Lithuania
- Mykolas Sleževičius - a former prime minister of Lithuania
- Jokūbas Šernas - a signatory to the Act of Independence of Lithuania
- Antanas Tumėnas - a former minister of justice and prime minister of Lithuania
- Virgilijus Valančius - chairman of the Supreme Administrative Court of the Republic of Lithuania

== See also ==
- Legal systems of the world
