= Danutė Jočienė =

Candidate for the General Court of the European Union

Her Excellency Danutė Jočienė

Judge of the General Court of the European Union
- Incumbent
- Assumed office 16 June 2025
- Nominated by: Prime Minister, Ingrida Šimonytė
- Preceded by: Rimvydas Norkus

Judge of the Supreme Court of Lithuania
- In office 16 March 2023 – 16 June 2025
- Chief Justice: Danguolė Bublienė

President of the Constitutional Court of Lithuania
- In office 18 June 2021 – 17 March 2023
- President: Gitanas Nausėda
- Prime Minister: Ingrida Šimonytė
- Preceded by: Dainius Žalimas
- Succeeded by: Gintaras Goda

Judge of the European Court of Human Rights
- In office 1 November 2004 – 31 October 2013

Personal details
- Born: Danutė Sadauskaitė; 10 November 1970 (age 56) Mažeikiai, Lithuania
- Citizenship: Lithuania
- Education: Vilnius University
- Occupation: Judge

Danutė Jočienė (Lithuanian: [[dɐˈnʊtɛ jɔˈt͡ʃiɛnɛ]]; born 10 November 1970) is a Lithuanian judge and legal professional who served as the President of the Constitutional Court of Lithuania from 18 June 2021 until 17 March 2023. In December 2024, she was nominated by the acting Prime Minister Ingrida Šimonytė to be a judge of the General Court of the European Union. She also served as a judge of the European Court of Human Rights from 2004 to 2013. Jočienė was a judge of the Constitutional Court of Lithuania from 2014 to 2023. She served as a judge of the Supreme Court of Lithuania. She is currently serving as the Judge of the General Court of the European Union.

== Education ==
Danutė completed her primary education at an eight-year school in Tučiai in 1986.She then attended Viekšniai Secondary School, graduating in 1989. In 1994, she graduated with honors from the Faculty of Law at Vilnius University. After five years, she defended her doctoral thesis at the same university. From 1994 to 2003, she served as a lecturer at the Faculty of Law, Vilnius University. Since 2014, she has been a professor at the Mykolas Romeris University Law School.

== Career ==
From 1994 to 2003, Jočienė served as an assistant, associate professor, and vice dean at the Faculty of Law, Vilnius University. During this period, she also worked as an expert at the Department of European Law under the Government of the Republic of Lithuania from 1997 to 2001. In 2003, she was appointed as the Agent of the Government before the European Court of Human Rights, a role she held until 2004. That same year, she was elected as a judge of the European Court of Human Rights, becoming the youngest judge in the Court's history at the age of 34. She served on the Court until 2013. In 2014, Jočienė was appointed to the Constitutional Court of the Republic of Lithuania. She became the first woman to chair the Constitutional Court in June 2021. Throughout her career, Jočienė has been actively involved in human rights initiatives, including contributing to the preparation of the Reform Protocol No. 14 of the European Convention on Human Rights. She has also collaborated with the Venice Commission of the Council of Europe and participated in various programs aimed at promoting human rights and legal education.

== See also ==
- Law of Lithuania
- Vilenas Vadapalas
- Pranas Kūris

== Sources ==
- Danutė Jočienė, MK (LT)
