= Criminal Code of Lithuania =

Criminal Code of the Republic of Lithuania (Lithuanian: Lietuvos Respublikos baudžiamasis kodeksas, abbreviated LR BK) is the prime source of law of Lithuania concerning criminal offences.

The Criminal Code came into force together with the Code of Criminal Process, Code of Punishment Execution and Code of Administrative Offenses.

== History ==
The origins of the criminal code can be traced back to the Statutes of Lithuania, enacted in the Grand Duchy of Lithuania in the 16th century, and later in the Polish–Lithuanian Commonwealth. They codified certain penalties and punishments, including the use of capital punishment.

The new Criminal Statute was adopted by the Republic of Lithuania on 16 January 1919. It was based on the Russian Criminal Code of 1903 with substantial amendments, including the removal of the capital punishment. Following the Soviet occupation, the criminal code was replaced with the Soviet one in 1961.

After the restoration of independence there were substantial amendments to the law in the 1990s, but a new criminal code, following a major reform, was enacted only in 2000, and entered force in 2003. There have been further substantial amendments to the criminal law since Lithuania joined the European Union in 2004.

== See also ==
- Capital punishment in Lithuania
- Civil Code of Lithuania

== Bibliography ==
- Armanas Abramavičius, Agnė Baranskaitė, Algimantas Čepas, Romualdas Drakšas, Anna Drakšienė, Oleg Fedosiuk, Girius Ivoška, Antanas Jatkevičius, Albertas Milinis, Vytas Milius, Vladas Pavilonis, Jonas Prapiestis, Deividas Soloveičikas, Gintautas Šulija, Gintaras Švedas (Editor-in-chief: Jonas Prapiestis): Lietuvos Respublikos baudžiamojo kodekso komentaras I dalis. 1st Edition: 1-98. Teisinės informacijos centras, Vilnius 2004, ISBN 9955-557-53-2.
- Egidijus Bieliūnas, Gintaras Švedas, Armanas Abramavičius: Lietuvos Respublikos baudžiamojo kodekso komentaras. 2nd Edition: 99–212. Registrų centras, Vilnius 2009, ISBN 978-9955-30-054-0.
- Egidijus Bieliūnas, Gintaras Švedas, Armanas Abramavičius: Lietuvos Respublikos baudžiamojo kodekso komentaras. 3rd Edition: 213-330. Registrų centras, Vilnius 2010, ISBN 978-9955-30-076-2.
