= Gintaras Goda =

Lithuanian judge and professor (born 1965)

Judge of the Supreme Court
- Incumbent
- Assumed office 11 June 2026

11th President of the Constitutional Court of Lithuania
- In office 6 April 2023 – 20 March 2026; Acting: 17 March 2023 – 6 April 2023
- President: Gitanas Nausėda
- Prime Minister: Ingrida Šimonytė; Gintautas Paluckas; Inga Ruginienė
- Preceded by: Danutė Jočienė
- Succeeded by: Tomas Davulis

Member of the Constitutional Court of Lithuania
- In office 2017–2026

Personal details
- Born: 13 June 1965 (age 61) Labanoras, Lithuania
- Citizenship: Lithuania
- Education: Vilnius University

Gintaras Goda (Lithuanian: [ˈɡʲɪn̪t̪ɐrɐs ˈɡʲɐ̂ːd̪ɐ]; born 13 June 1965) is a Lithuanian judge, legal researcher, comparative criminal procedure expert and professor at the Faculty of Law of Vilnius University. He served as President of the Constitutional Court of Lithuania from 2023 to 2026, had been a Judge of the Supreme Administrative Court of Lithuania from 2002 to 2005 and was Judge of the Supreme Court of Lithuania from 2005 to 2017 and is currently serving in that office since 11 June 2026.

== Early life and education ==
In 1990, Goda graduated with honors from the Faculty of Law of Vilnius University. From 1990–1991 he studied at the Faculty of Law of the J. V. Goethe University of Frankfurt am Main, where he became a Master of Laws (LL.M.). From 1992–1995, he studied at the doctoral studies at the Faculty of Law of Vilnius University. He interned in Heidelberg (1995), Berlin (1993).

From 1995–2002, he was a research fellow at the Law Institute, consultant at the Lithuanian Court of Appeal, and employee of the Ministry of Justice of the Republic of Lithuania as an advisor on criminal law and procedure issues. From 1996–2002, he was an employee of the Legal Department of the Chancellery of the Seimas of the Republic of Lithuania. From 2002–2005, he was a member of the Chief Electoral Commission. From 2005–2017, he was a judge of the Supreme Administrative Court of Lithuania and Judge of the Criminal Cases Division of the Supreme Court of Lithuania.

Since 1990 he has been an Assistant at the Department of Criminology and Criminal Procedure, Faculty of Law, Vilnius University. He has also been Senior Assistant and Lecturer since 1998 and had been Associate Professor and Head of the Department from 2000 to September 2008. He has scientific interest criminal procedure, and has taught Criminal Procedure Law and Fundamentals of Criminal Procedure in Foreign Countries.

He was a member of the working group for the preparation of the new Criminal Procedure Code of Lithuania. Since 16 November 1998 he has been a member of the working group for the examination of the provisions of laws and other legal acts regulating the procedure for the seizure of property and for the preparation of drafts of the necessary legal acts (their amendments). He participated in the preparation of drafts of other laws of Lithuania. He published scientific articles, prepared a training tool, was a co-author of criminal procedure textbooks, a commentary on the Criminal Procedure Code of the Republic of Lithuania, and scientific editor of Part II of the commentary on the Criminal Procedure Code of the Republic of Lithuania.

In March 2023, he became the acting chairman of the Constitutional Court of Lithuania and in April 2023, he was nominated by the President and soon appointed by the Seimas as the president.

== Works ==
- Goda G. Fundamentals of Criminal Procedure in Foreign Countries. - Teaching Aid. Vilnius, 1997.
- Goda, G., Kazlauskas, M., Kuconis, P. et al., Commentary on the Criminal Procedure Code of the Republic of Lithuania, Book I: Parts I–IV. Vilnius. 2003.
- Criminal Procedure Law / Gintaras Goda, Marcelis Kazlauskas, Pranas Kuconis. Vilnius: Legal Information Center, 2005.
- Collective of authors (scientific editor: Gintaras Goda). Commentary on the Criminal Procedure Code of the Republic of Lithuania. (Part II).
- Goda, G. Trends in the Development of Criminal Procedure in Europe. // Law Problems: Scientific-Practical Journal, 1999, No. 3, pp. 5–18.
- Goda, G. Presumption of Innocence: Establishment in Lithuanian Law and Some Aspects of Content. // Law: Scientific Works, 2002, Vol. 44, p. 42-53.
- Goda, G., Kazlauskas, M. The draft of the new Criminal Procedure Code: assumptions for its creation, structure, innovations. // Legal problems: scientific-practical journal, 1999, no. 3, p. 5-18.
