= Pranas Kūris =

Lithuanian lawyer

Pranas Kūris (born August 20, 1938 in Šeduva, Radviliškis District Municipality) – lawyer, political figure of the Communist Party of the Soviet Union and the Lithuanian SSR, member of the Central Committee of the Communist Party of Lithuania, Minister of Justice of the LSSR, the only minister of the occupational Soviet government to become a member of the first Lithuanian Government after the restoration of Independence (first Minister of Justice), professor at Vilnius University (VU), lecturer at the Faculty of Law, judge of international courts, legal scholar and internationalist, diplomat, ambassador, honorary doctor of the Mykolas Romeris University.

His son is Egidijus Kūris (born 1961) – lecturer in constitutional law, professor at Vilnius University, head of the Department of Public Law at the Faculty of Law of VU, former chairman of the Constitutional Court of Lithuania, lecturer at the VU Institute of International Relations and Political Science.

== Education, pedagogical, scientific activities ==
Pranas Kūris graduated from the Faculty of Law of VU, where he was awarded the qualification of a lawyer (1961). Later, he continued his studies in postgraduate studies (1963–1965), defended his dissertation of the candidate of legal sciences “The status of a free city in international law” at the Faculty of Law of Moscow University (March 15, 1965), candidate of legal sciences, on October 26, 1973 – his dissertation on the topic “The concept and foundations of legal liability in modern international law”, Doctor of Laws (nostrified by the Lithuanian Research Council into the degrees of Doctor of Law in the field of social sciences and habilitated doctor, respectively). He deepened his knowledge at the Institute of Advanced International Studies of the University of Paris (internship supervisor – Professor Ch. Rousseau), and at the Hague Academy of International Law.

Taught law subjects at the Faculty of Law of VU (public international law, etc.) and held administrative functions at Vilnius University (1961–1990). Lecturer, associate professor, dean of the Faculty of Law of VU. Since 1974, Professor at Vilnius University, corresponding member of the Lithuanian Academy of Sciences (since 1990), academician of the Lithuanian Academy of Sciences (1996).

Pranas Kūris' main area of research is international law and the liability of states for violations of international law. He has published more than 70 works on this topic, including 5 books. The conclusions of the monograph "Violations of International Law and State Responsibility" (1973) were used by the United Nations International Law Commission when drafting the Convention on State Responsibility. He has published over 200 publications. He has been the author of the journal Mokslas ir gyvenimas since 1977. He is an honorary doctor of the Lithuanian University of Law (MRU) (2001). He has read papers at various international conferences.

== Practical activities ==
Minister of Justice of the Lithuanian SSR (1977–1990), Minister of Justice of the First Government of the Republic of Lithuania after the Restoration of Independence (March 17, 1990 – January 10, 1991); Author of the Moratorium on the Act of March 11 (on the suspension of the Act of the Re-Establishment of the State of Lithuania or its legal consequences), for which the then Government (Prime Minister Kazimira Prunskienė) was even accused of treason. State Counselor of the Republic of Lithuania (1991–1992), member of the Lithuanian State Delegation for negotiations with the USSR (1990–1992), Ambassador Extraordinary and Plenipotentiary to Belgium, Luxembourg and the Netherlands (1992–1994).

In 1992, when the Soviet nomenklatura returned to power during the 1992 Lithuanian parliamentary election, it began to form the Lithuanian courts, appointing loyal persons as their heads, abolishing the Supreme Court of Lithuania and re-appointing the judges of the Supreme Court (after getting rid of the then Supreme Court President Mindaugas Lošys, who was unfavourable to the LDDP majority), Kūris became a judge of the Supreme Court of Lithuania and the President of this Court (from December 1994 to October 1998). Chairman of the Council of the judiciary of Lithuania (1995).

Judge of the European Court of Human Rights (Strasbourg), serving 2 terms (from June 1994 to 2004), Judge of the European Court of Justice (from 11 May 2004 to autumn 2010).

Speaks Russian, English, French.

- Order of Gediminas, second degree, for merits in political and scientific activities (to commemorate the 80th anniversary of the restoration of the Lithuanian state).

== Publications ==
- Efektyvi kova su liaudies turto grobstymu
- Aš – Tarybų Sąjungos pilietis
- Auklėti įsitikinusius kovotojus už komunizmą
- Lietuvos TSR Konstitucija ir aktualūs socialistinio valstybingumo, teisės ir teisės mokslų vystymo klausimai respublikoje. – 1979. – 126 p.
- Tarptautinės teisės teorijos pagrindai. – 1972. – 134 p. – Kūris, Pranas (1938-).
- Suvienytųjų nacijų organizacijos įstatai; Tarptautinio teismo statutas. – 1981. – 87 p.
- Kūris P., Požarskas M. Tarptautinės teisės apybraižos. Vilnius: Mintis, 1985.

== See also ==
- List of members of the European Court of Justice
- Law of Lithuania
- Danutė Jočienė
- Egidijus Kūris
