= Constitutional Court of Lithuania =

Constitutional Court of the Republic of Lithuania
- Lietuvos Respublikos Konstitucinis Teismas
- Interactive map of Constitutional Court of the Republic of Lithuania
- 54.688°N 25.273°E
- Established: 1992
- Jurisdiction: Republic of Lithuania
- Location: Gediminas Avenue, Vilnius, Lithuania
- Coordinates: 54.688°N 25.273°E
- Composition method: Renewed by a third every three years, each judge nominated by the President, Speaker of Seimas and the Head of the Supreme Court and appointed by Seimas
- Authorised by: Constitution of Lithuania
- Judge term length: 9 years (only one term allowed)
- Number of positions: 9
- Website: lrkt.lt

President of the Constitutional Court of Lithuania
- Currently: Tomas Davulis
- Since: 21 April 2026

Constitutional Court of the Republic of Lithuania (in Lithuanian: Lietuvos Respublikos Konstitucinis Teismas) is the constitutional court of the Republic of Lithuania, established by the Constitution of the Republic of Lithuania of 1992. It began the activities after the adoption of the Law of Constitutional Court of the Republic of Lithuania on 3 February 1993. Since its inception, the court has been located in Vilnius.

The main task of the court is judicial review. It may therefore declare the acts of the Seimas unconstitutional and thus render them ineffective. As such, it is comparable to the Federal Constitutional Court of Germany or, in a limited scope, to the Supreme Court of the United States. However, it differs from it and other supreme courts in that it is not part of the regular judicial system, but more a unique judicial branch. Most importantly, it does not serve as a regular court of appeals from lower courts or as a sort of "superappellate court" on any violation of national laws.

Its jurisdiction is focused on constitutional issues, the integrity of the Constitution. Moreover, it adjudicates on the conformance of the acts of the Government of the Republic of Lithuania to the laws, compliance with the Constitution of international agreements, as well as their ratification, and takes a final decision on voting infringements.

== Activities ==
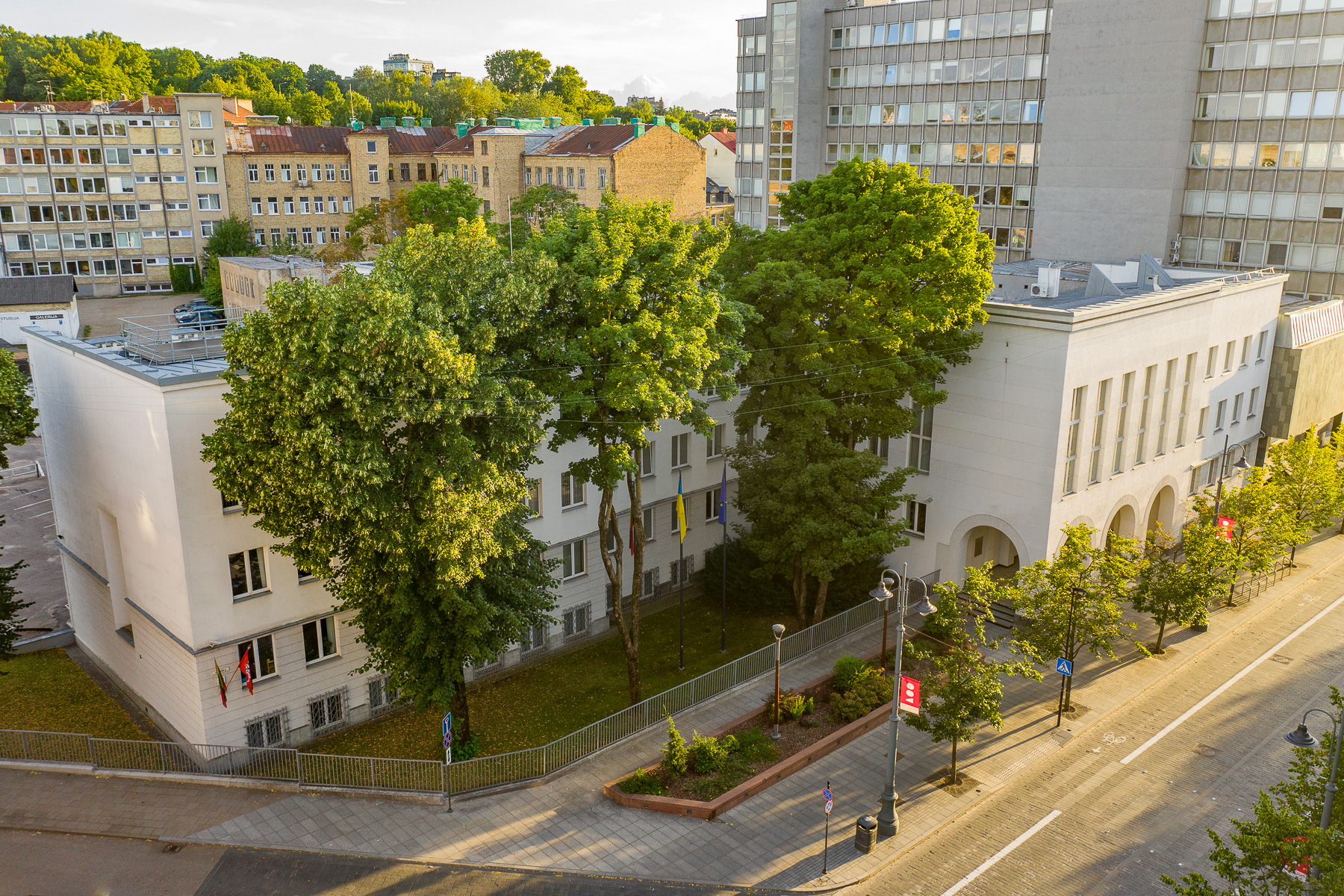
Headquarters of Constitutional Court in Vilnius

The Court has played a substantial role in the development of the Lithuanian legal system, declaring a number of national laws unconstitutional. On 31 March 2004, it issued a ruling acknowledging the breach of the oath of office by the President Rolandas Paksas. He was removed from office by Seimas following the impeachment on 6 April 2004; this has been the first successful case of impeachment of the head of state in the history of Europe. The ruling interpreted the Constitution as precluding a person, who was pleaded guilty for the breach of oath, from assuming any future position in public service, which requires taking an oath.

On 9 December 1998, the Constitutional Court declared that article 105 of the criminal code of the Republic of Lithuania, which established the death penalty, violated several articles of the Constitution. This ruling was a big step in humanizing the punishment system.

== Composition ==
The Court comprises nine justices, appointed by the Seimas, for a nine-year non-renewable term of office. Only Lithuanian citizens of an impeccable reputation, who are trained in law, and who have served for at least 10 years in the legal profession, or in an area of legal education are eligible for appointment. Usually, notable legal scholars and highly experienced judges qualify for the position. The court is renewed by a third every three years. The candidates are nominated by the Chairman of the Seimas, the President of Lithuania and the President of the Supreme Court of the Republic of Lithuania, the Seimas then decides on appointing them. The Seimas appoints the President of the Court from among the justices upon the nomination by the President of the state.

== Members ==
=== Current members ===
Background shading indicates that the person is the current President of the Constitutional Court of Lithuania.

Name	Date of birth	Hometown	President	Date appointed	Mandatory retirement year	Law School	Prior judicial office
Giedrė Lastauskienė	2 June 1967 (age 59)	Šilalė	Nausėda	15 January 2021	2029	Vilnius University	
Algis Norkūnas	24 August 1962 (age 63)	Trakai	Nausėda	15 January 2021	2029	Vilnius University	Ignalina District Local Court; Vilnius Regional Court; Supreme Court of Lithuania
Vytautas Mizaras	20 August 1974 (age 51)	Babrai	Nausėda	9 June 2021	2029	Vilnius University; Goethe University Frankfurt	
Tomas Davulis	29 May 1975 (age 51)	Vilnius	Nausėda	16 March 2023	2032	Vilnius University; University of Freiburg	
Aurelijus Gutauskas	22 May 1972 (age 54)	Vilkaviškis	Nausėda	16 March 2023	2032	Mykolas Riomeris University	
Stasys Šedbaras	February 10, 1958 (age 68)	Tūjainiai	Nausėda	16 March 2023	2032	Vilnius University	
Artūras Driukas	August 4, 1961 (age 64)	Švenčionėliai	Nausėda	19 March 2026	2035	Vilnius University	Druskininkai City District Court; Court of Appeal of Lithuania; Supreme Court of Lithuania
Haroldas Šinkūnas	July 24, 1972 (age 53)	Ignalina	Nausėda	19 March 2026	2035	Vilnius University; Goethe University Frankfurt	
Artūras Drigotas	January 7, 1965 (age 61)	Joniškis	Nausėda	19 March 2026	2035	Vilnius University	Vilnius City District Court; Supreme Administrative Court of Lithuania

=== Historical composition ===
1993–1996

- Juozas Žilys (President)
- Algirdas Gailiūnas
- Kęstutis Lapinskas
- Zigmas Levickis
- Vladas Pavilonis († 2003)
- Pranas Vytautas Rasimavičius († 2002)
- Teodora Staugaitienė
- Stasys Stačiokas
- Stasys Šedbaras

1996–1999

- Juozas Žilys (President)
- Egidijus Jarašiūnas
- Kęstutis Lapinskas
- Zigmas Levickis
- Augustinas Normantas
- Vladas Pavilonis (†2003)
- Jonas Prapiestis
- Pranas Vytautas Rasimavičius (†2002)
- Teodora Staugaitienė

1999–2002

- Vladas Pavilonis (President) (†2003)
- Egidijus Jarašiūnas
- Egidijus Kūris
- Zigmas Levickis
- Augustinas Normantas
- Jonas Prapiestis
- Vytautas Sinkevičius
- Stasys Stačiokas
- Teodora Staugaitienė

2002–2005

- Egidijus Kūris (President)
- Egidijus Jarašiūnas
- Augustinas Normantas
- Armanas Abramavičius
- Kęstutis Lapinskas
- Zenonas Namavičius
- Jonas Prapiestis
- Vytautas Sinkevičius
- Stasys Stačiokas

2005-2008

- Egidijus Kūris (President)
- Vytautas Sinkevičius
- Stasys Stačiokas
- Kęstutis Lapinskas
- Armanas Abramavičius
- Zenonas Namavičius
- Romualdas Kęstutis Urbaitis
- Toma Birmontienė
- Ramutė Ruškytė

2008-2011

- Kęstutis Lapinskas (President)
- Armanas Abramavičius
- Zenonas Namavičius
- Romualdas Kęstutis Urbaitis
- Toma Birmontienė
- Ramutė Ruškytė
- Pranas Kuconis
- Egidijus Šileikis
- Algirdas Taminskas

2011-2014

- Romualdas Kęstutis Urbaitis (President)
- Toma Birmontienė
- Ramutė Ruškytė
- Pranas Kuconis
- Egidijus Šileikis
- Algirdas Taminskas
- Dainius Žalimas
- Egidijus Bieliūnas
- Gediminas Mesonis

2014-2017

- Dainius Žalimas (President)
- Pranas Kuconis
- Egidijus Šileikis
- Algirdas Taminskas
- Gediminas Mesonis
- Elvyra Baltutytė
- Vytas Milius
- Vytautas Greičius
- Danutė Jočienė

2017-2020

- Dainius Žalimas (President)
- Gediminas Mesonis
- Elvyra Baltutytė
- Vytas Milius
- Vytautas Greičius
- Danutė Jočienė
- Gintaras Goda
- Daiva Petrylaitė
- Janina Stripeikienė

2020-2023

- Danutė Jočienė (President)
- Elvyra Baltutytė
- Vytautas Greičius
- Gintaras Goda
- Daiva Petrylaitė
- Janina Stripeikienė
- Giedrė Lastauskienė
- Algis Norkūnas
- Vytautas Mizaras

2023-2026

- Gintaras Goda (President)
- Daiva Petrylaitė
- Janina Stripeikienė
- Giedrė Lastauskienė
- Algis Norkūnas
- Vytautas Mizaras
- Tomas Davulis
- Aurelijus Gutauskas
- Stasys Šedbaras
