= Valentinas Mikelėnas =

Lithuanian lawyer

Valentinas Mikelėnas (born 6 April 1958) is a Lithuanian lawyer, former Justice of the Supreme Court of Lithuania, and one of the most prominent Lithuanian civil law scholars at Vilnius University. Mikelėnas was the head of the Drafting Group of the Civil Code of Lithuania in 1991. He is also one of the founding members of the European Law Institute, a non-profit organisation that conducts research, makes recommendations and provides practical guidance in the field of European legal development. He is a partner in the law firm Ellex Valiunas.
