= 1992 Lithuanian constitutional referendum =

25 October 1992

Results
Choice	Votes	%
Yes	1,447,334	78.24%
No	402,622	21.76%
Valid votes	1,849,956	96.40%
Invalid or blank votes	69,117	3.60%
Total votes	1,919,073	100.00%
Registered voters/turnout	2,549,952	75.26%

A referendum on a new constitution was held in Lithuania on 25 October 1992, alongside the first round of parliamentary elections. It was approved by 78.2% of those voting and 56.8% of all registered voters, passing the 50% threshold.

== Results ==
Choice	Votes	%
For	1,447,334	78.2
Against	402,622	21.8
Invalid/blank votes	69,117	–
Total	1,919,073	100
Registered voters/turnout	2,549,952	75.3
Source: Nohlen & Stöver
