= Michał Pius Römer =

Lithuanian lawyer

Michał Pius Paschalis Römer
- Mykolas Römeris
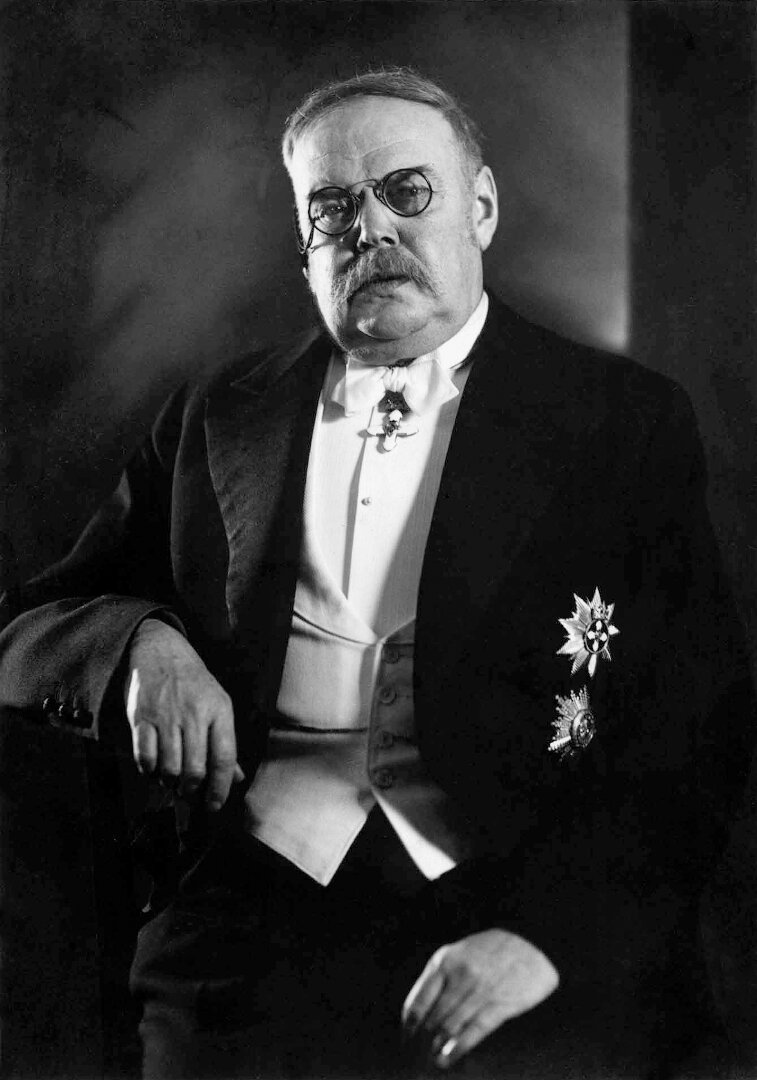
- Römeris in 1936

6th Rector of Vytautas Magnus University
- In office May 28, 1933 – October 12, 1939
- Preceded by: Pranas Jodelė
- Succeeded by: Stasys Šalkauskis

Personal details
- Born: 7 May 1880 Bagdoniškis
- Died: 22 February 1945 (aged 64) Vilnius
- Spouses: Regina Rachela Kazimiera Römer (m. 1909; div. 1909); Jadvyga Čepaitė (m. 1938; died 1945)
- Children: Celina Römer (1910); Konstancija-Mikalina Römerytė (1938); Jadvyga Romerytė-Vitkauskienė (1940); Žermena Zakarevičienė (1944)
- Parents: Michał Kazimierz Römer; Konstancja Tukałło
- Occupation: lawyer professor statesman

Michał Pius Paschalis Römer (Lithuanian: Mykolas Römeris; 28 May 1880 – 22 February 1945) was a Polish-Lithuanian lawyer, scientist and politician.

== Early years ==
Römer was born in Lithuania into a Polish noble family of Baltic-German (Livonian) origin. He was one of szlachta members loyal to the heritage of the Grand Duchy of Lithuania, referred to as Krajowcy. His father was Michał Kazimierz Römer and mother was Konstancja née Tukałło.

He attended the Imperial School of Jurisprudence in Saint Petersburg (1893–1901) and later studied history in the Jagiellonian University in Kraków (1901–1902), after that he moved to Paris to study in the École des sciences politiques (1902–1905). In Paris, he belonged to the Spójnia organisation, where he headed the group called "Lithuania", and was closely related to the Foreign Union of Polish Socialists. He gave the lecture on cultural-ethnographic situation in Lithuania in Café Voltaire. It was later published in Kraków by Krytyka under the title Stosunki etnograficzno-kulturalne na Litwie.

In 1905, he returned to Lithuania, where he began to work for the restoration of Lithuanian statehood, not dominated by any nationalism. As he put it, he tried persuading the Lithuanian Poles to have "a common national citizenship (Polish: obywatelstwo krajowe) without renouncing cultural and national distinctions". To this end, he and Zenon Pietkiewicz founded the Gazeta Wileńska, which was published from 15 February 1906. The radical paper was soon closed, on 7 July that year, although it already had 2,000 subscribers. Romer had to flee to Kraków, for fear of being arrested.

In 1908 he wrote Lithuania: Study of National Revival (Litwa: studium odrodzenia narodowego). In his work he justified the Lithuanians' rights to their own statehood. He refuted accusations that Lithuanian activists were Russian agents. He also defended the right of Lithuanian Poles to preserve their own identity in the future Lithuanian state.

Later that year he came back to Vilnius, when he continued his publicist work. He wrote works on Poles in Lithuania and Ruthenia and on Lithuanians in the Duchy of Prussia (Litwini w Prusach książęcych, 1911). He joined the Society of Friends of Science in Wilno and accompanied Ludwik Krzywicki on his archaeological work in Samogitia.

== World War I ==
At the outbreak of World War I, Römer maintained contacts with independence and socialist circles in Warsaw, and distributed leaflets in Lithuania. He worked on the editorial board of the re-established Przegląd Wileński. Römer took an oath as a lawyer in early 1915.

In March 1915, he took the Lithuanian politicians Mykolas Sleževičius and Jurgis Šaulys to Warsaw for a meeting with Stanisław Patek. Römer left Vilnius on 27 May 1915 and went via Odesa to Romania and then to Galicia. At the delegation of the Supreme National Committee (NKN), he was accepted into the Polish Legions and sent to the Press Office of the Military Department of the NKN in Piotrków. In August, he submitted an extensive memorandum to the Supreme National Committee entitled Lithuania at War (Litwa wobec wojny). On 28 August 1915, he left Piotrków, wanting to take part in the armed struggle. On 14 September 1915, after a personal conversation with Józef Piłsudski in Kovel, he was assigned to the 1st Legions Infantry Regiment and, under the pseudonym Mateusz Rzymski, took part in the Volhynia campaign as a private. He soon fell ill and was hospitalized for a longer period – in Rzeszów, then Kraków, where he stayed until February 1916.

After a period of service in the Military Department of the NKN, in September 1916 he returned to the 1st Legions Infantry Regiment's 1st Battalion's 1st Company to the front to Grywiatka, then with the regiment to Baranavichy and Łomża. During the Oath crisis in July 1917, he refused to take the oath of allegiance to the German Emperor and on 18 July 1917, he was interned in the camp in Szczypiorno. In August 1917, thanks to the efforts of his Warsawian friends, he was released from the camp. Since 14 September 1917 until 13 November 1918 he worked as a justice of the peace in Kolno in the German puppet Kingdom of Poland, then he was transferred to the position of district judge in Łomża.

== Interwar ==
=== Polish–Lithuanian War ===
Before taking up this position in Łomża, he stayed in Vilnius in early December. While working in Łomża, he became involved in political activity. He chaired the district electoral commission in connection with the elections to the Sejm.

In March 1919 he came to Warsaw at the request of Józef Piłsudski. Piłsudski sent him to Kaunas to head a government composed of Poles and Lithuanians. Romer arrived in Kaunas on 15 April, but his plans were rejected by Lithuanian politicians. He then returned to Vilnius, which was then in Polish hands, but did not take up any public office. On 4 May, he returned to Łomża. During the summer, he travelled to Lithuania. He finished his work in Łomża on 20 March 1920 and left for Lithuania, where he settled permanently.

In September 1920, after the Lithuanian army had taken Vilnius, he became the head of Gazeta Krajowa. The paper supported Lithuanian statehood, respecting the Polish language and culture. After the capture of Vilnius by General Lucjan Żeligowski, he went to Kaunas and in a letter to Józef Piłsudski protested against the violation of Lithuania's rights to its capital. He chose instead to move to Kaunas, which had become the temporary capital of the independent Republic of Lithuania.

=== 1920–1939 ===
He was a notable figure in the interwar Lithuania, and was a member of the Supreme Tribunal of Lithuania (1921–1928) and the State Council of Lithuania (1928–1931). He was a professor at the University of Lithuania/Vytautas Magnus University (1922–1940), Vilnius University (1940–1945), and the rector of the University of Lithuania for three terms (1927–1928, 1933–36 and 1936–1939). As an international lawyer, in 1932 he represented Lithuania at the Permanent Court of International Justice regarding the Klaipėda Directorate. The court found in Lithuania's favor that Otto Böttcher had violated the Klaipėda Convention. He published a work on this matter entitled: Le système juridique des garanties de la souveraineté de la Lithuanie sur le territoire de Memel (1936).

Römer wrote important works on Lithuanian history and on law, such as the 1908 book Litwa. Studyum o odrodzeniu narodu litewskiego and the 1928 book Die Verfassungsreform Litauens im Jahre 1928. He is considered to be one of the most prominent Lithuanian jurists, the progenitor, first lector and one of the most prominent authors of interwar Lithuanian constitutional law. While most of his writings on Lithuanian law were written in Lithuanian and his signature on Lithuanian documents and letters was Mykolas Römeris, (sometimes also credited as Mykolas Rėmeris or Mykolas Riomeris), he continued to write his diary in Polish and use the German form of his name (Michael von Römer) for his law writings in German. He did not break his ties with Polishness, and still was publishing in Polish, for example Listy z Kowna ("Letters from Kaunas"). He willingly visited Poland and hosted Polish personalities visiting Lithuania.

== World War II ==
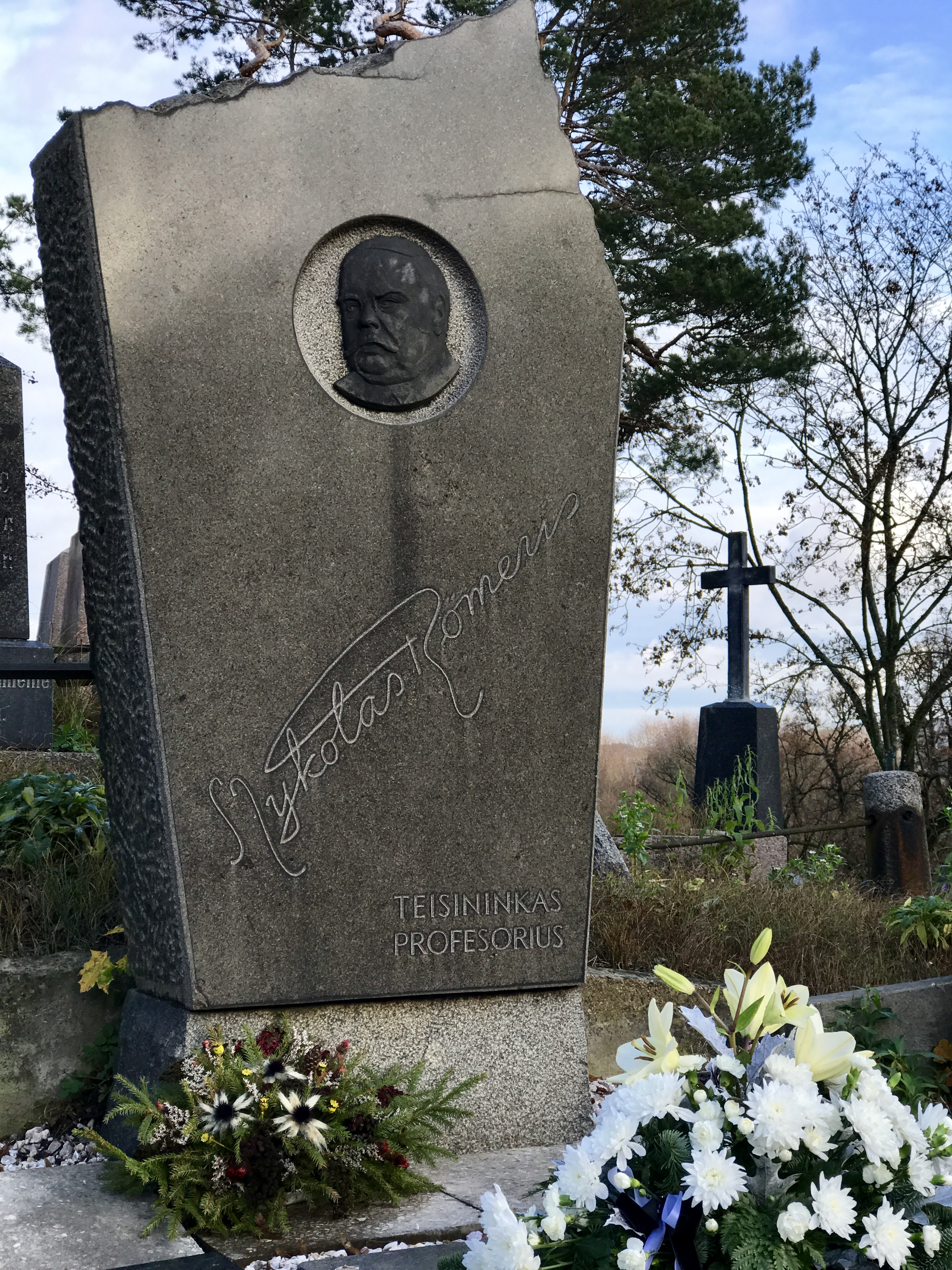
Michał Römer grave at the Rasos Cemetery

In February 1940 he moved to Vilnius, where the Lithuanian University, of which he was rector, had been transferred. He organised meetings of Lithuanian and Polish activists in an attempt to find common ground. He remained in this position after the Soviet occupation of Lithuania. After the university was closed down by the Germans, he took part in secret teaching. He maintained contacts with the Polish underground movement. He returned to the university after the Red Army occupied Vilnius again in 1944. He died on 22 February 1945. He was buried on Rasos Cemetery.

== Commemoration ==
The Law University of Lithuania in Vilnius was renamed to the Mykolas Romeris University in 2004.

== Awards ==
- Order of Vytautas the Great, Grand Cross with Star
- Latvian Order of the Three Stars 2nd Class, 15 November 1935

== Publications ==
- Michał Römer, Stosunki etnograficzno-kulturalne na Litwie, Kraków 1906.
- Michał Römer, Litwa. Studyum o odrodzeniu narodu litewskiego, Lwów 1908.
- Michał Römer, Litwini w Prusiech Książęcych, Kraków 1911.
- Michał Römer, Dzień 6 sierpnia 1914 roku, Warszawa 1916.
- Michał Römer, Litewskie stronnictwa polityczne, Wilno 1921.
- Mykolas Römeris, Le système juridique des garanties de la souveraineté de la Lithuanie sur le territoire de Memel, Paris 1930.
- Michael von Römer, Die Verfassungsreform Litauens vom Jahre 1928, München 1930.
- Mykolas Römeris, Valstybė ir jos konstitucinė teisė, Kaunas 1934–1939.
- Mykolas Römeris, Lietuvos konstitucinės teisės paskaitos (Cours de droit constitutionnel lithuanien), Kaunas 1937.
- Michał Römer, Zasługi Ludwika Krzywickiego wobec nauki litewskiej, Warszawa 1938.
- Michał Römer, Organizacja władzy politycznej w rozwoju konstytucyjnym Republiki Litewskiej, Warszawa 1939.
- Mykolas Römeris. Lietuva. Studija apie lietuvių tautos atgimimą. ISBN 9955-601-94-9
- Mykolas Römeris. Konstitucinės ir teismo teisės pasieniuose. ISBN 9986-9004-1-7

== Bibliography ==
- `Dąbrowski, Karol; Witkowski, Wojciech (2019). "Sądowe zapiski w Dziennikach Michała Römera (Królewsko-Polski Sąd Pokoju w Kolnie 1917–1918)". Z Dziejów Prawa (in Polish). 12 (20): 329–354. doi:10.31261/ZDP.2019.20.21. ISSN 2353-9879.`
- Kieniewicz, Stefan (1988–1989). "Michał Pius Romer". Polski Słownik Biograficzny (in Polish). Vol. 31. Wrocław. pp. 653–655.
- Academical biography. Retrieved 2007-10-02
- Solak, Zbigniew (2004). Między Polską a Litwą. Życie i działalność Michała Römera (in Polish). Kraków: Arcana. ISBN 83-89243-86-5.
- Miknys, Rimantas. Wilno i wileńszczyzna w koncepcjach Michała Römera i krajowców [Vilnius and its Area in the conception of Michał Römer and his compatriots] (in Polish).
- Solak, Zbigniew (1996). Nie dokończona autobiografia Michała Römera (in Polish).
