= President of the Constitutional Court of Lithuania =

- Lietuvos Konstitucinio Teismo pirmininkas
- Emblem of the Constitutional Court of Lithuania

- Flag of the Republic of Lithuania
- Incumbent; Tomas Davulis since 21 April 2026
- Constitutional Court of Lithuania
- Style: His Excellency
- Type: Head of the Constitutional Court
- Status: Chief Justice
- Member of: Justices of the Constitutional Court
- Appointer: President of Lithuania with the agreement of Seimas
- Term length: 9 years, one term
- Formation: 1993
- First holder: Juozas Žilys
- Salary: €90000 annually
- Website: https://www.lrkt.lt

The President of the Constitutional Court of Lithuania (Lithuanian: Lietuvos Konstitucinio Teismo pirmininkas) is the chief justice of the Constitutional Court, overseeing its full bench of nine justices. The president represents the Court and leads its proceedings, ensuring the constitutionality of laws and acts.

This position is one of the highest judicial offices in Lithuania, on par with the President of the Supreme Court. The role of the president is defined in the Law on the Constitutional Court. The current President of the Constitutional Court of Lithuania is Tomas Davulis.

== Duties ==
The President of the Constitutional Court of Lithuania holds significant responsibilities to ensure the court functions effectively and upholds the Constitution. Key duties include organizing and overseeing the work of the Constitutional Court, representing the court in official capacities both domestically and internationally, and presiding over court hearings and deliberations. Additionally, the President ensures cases are examined in a timely and fair manner, participates in the review of laws and other legal acts to ensure compliance with the Constitution, and manages the court's internal operations and administration. This includes overseeing the preparation of the court's budget and ensuring efficient use of resources. The President also acts as the primary spokesperson for the Constitutional Court, issuing public statements on behalf of the court regarding its rulings and other activities. Furthermore, the President provides constitutional guidance to state institutions when necessary and engages in discussions on constitutional law and legal reforms. These responsibilities are outlined in the Law on the Constitutional Court of the Republic of Lithuania.

== Appointment ==
The President of the Constitutional Court of Lithuania is appointed by the President of Lithuania with the approval of the Seimas. The parliament conducts a vote, and if the vote is successful, the President of the Constitutional Court is officially elected and appointed.

== Presidents ==
The current Incumbent is Tomas Davulis.

No.	Name	Tenure		Appointed by
1	Juozas Žilys	1993	1996	Algirdas Brazauskas
2	Juozas Žilys	1996	1999	Algirdas Brazauskas
3	Vladas Pavilonis	1999	2002	Valdas Adamkus
4	Egidijus Kūris	2002	2005	Valdas Adamkus
5	Egidijus Kūris	2005	2008	Valdas Adamkus
6	Kęstutis Lapinskas	2008	2011	Valdas Adamkus
7	Romualdas Kęstutis Urbaitis	2011	2014	Dalia Grybauskaitė
8	Dainius Žalimas	2014	2017	Dalia Grybauskaitė
9	Dainius Žalimas	2017	2020	Dalia Grybauskaitė
10	Danutė Jočienė	2020	2023	Gitanas Nausėda
11	Gintaras Goda	2023	2026	Gitanas Nausėda
12	Tomas Davulis	2026	Incumbent	Gitanas Nausėda
