= Kęstutis Lapinskas =

Lithuanian scholar of constitutional law

Kęstutis Lapinskas (29 January 1937) is an expert of Constitutional law and former President of Constitutional Court of the Republic of Lithuania, who replaced Egidijus Kūris at this position. Kęstutis Lapinskas is one of the signatory of the Act of the Re-Establishment of the State of Lithuania, former President of the Supreme Administrative Court of Lithuania.

== Biography ==
Kęstutis Lapinskas was born in Šakiai district back in 1937. After initial education he moved to Vilnius there he finished Faculty of Law at Vilnius University, in 1960. After almost six years finished M.V. Lomonosov Moscow State University and defended his thesis. Worked in various positions in Vilnius University, including associate professor and later, Head of the Department of Public Law of the Faculty of Law. On March 11, 1990, sign the Act of the Re-Establishment of the State of Lithuania, soon afterwards he was appointed into work group drafting Lithuanian Constitution. Between 1993 and 1999 served as Justice of Constitutional Court of the Republic of Lithuania, in 2000 took position as President of the Supreme Administrative Court of Lithuania, after two years he was appointed to justice of the Constitutional Court for second term. In 2008, Kęstutis Lapinskas was named as President of Constitutional Court, replacing Egidijus Kūris.
