= Tomas Davulis =

Lithuanian legal scholar

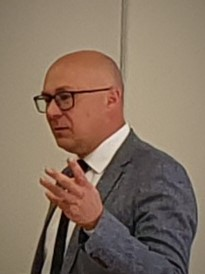
- Davulis, 2023

President of the Constitutional Court
- Incumbent
- Assumed office 21 April 2026
- President: Gitanas Nausėda
- Prime Minister: Inga Ruginienė
- Preceded by: Gintaras Goda

Personal details
- Born: 29 May 1975 (age 51) Lithuania
- Occupation: Law scholar

Tomas Davulis (born 29 May 1975) is a Lithuanian labour law scholar, professor at Vilnius University and Dean of Vilnius University Faculty of Law serving as the President of the Constitutional Court of Lithuania since 2026.

== Education ==
From 1993 to 1998, he attended the Faculty of Law of Vilnius University, specialising in Labour Law and Social Security. The title of his paper was Collective Agreements under German Law. From 2000 to 2001, he attended the Faculty of Law of the University of Freiburg in Germany, pursuing his Legum Magister (LL.M.). The title of his thesis was Impact of the European Labour Law on the Law of EU-Candidate Countries: Case Lithuania. He graduated summa cum laude. From 2000 to 2002, he was a doctoral student at Vilnius University. The title of his doctoral thesis was Problems of Integrating of Lithuanian Labour Law into the Legal System of European Union.

== Professional career ==
Early in his career, Davulis worked as a lawyer in Lithuanian Workers’ Union (from 1996 to 1998), later – as a lawyer in Joint Stock Company Lithuanian Exhibitions’ Centre “Litexpo” (from 1996 to 2000). Since 1998, Davulis has been affiliated with Vilnius University Faculty of Law (starting from the positions of Lecturer, Associate Professor, finally, becoming a Professor in 2013). From 2003 to 2012 he was Vice Dean for international relations and science, since 2012 he is the Dean of Vilnius University Faculty of Law. Additionally, Davulis is the Head of the Centre for Labour Law (since 2016). From 2006 to 2016 he was the Head of the Institute for Labour Law; he also was the Head of the Department of Labour Law (from 2006 to 2009). In March 2023, Davulis was appointed as Justice of the Constitutional Court of the Republic of Lithuania.

== Contributions to legislation, expert work ==
Davulis has participated while preparing and amending such laws of the Republic of Lithuania as: Labour Code (2002), Labour Code (2016), Law on the Civil Service (1999), Law on Employment (2016), Law on Works Councils (2004), Law on European Works Councils (2004), Law on Guarantees for Posted Workers (2007) etc. Since 2007 he is a member of European Commission’s Network of Independent Experts to implement labour law directives, since 2004 – a member of European Commission’s Network of Independent Experts to implement equality between men and women in employment sector, he is also a member of European Labour Law Network (a national expert and a member of scientific board).

== Professional engagement ==
Tomas Davulis currently holds various positions in professional bodies such as:

- Lithuanian Association of European Law (President since 2013)
- Lithuanian Society for Labour Law and Social Security (Vice President since 2003)
- Strategic Analysis Center (chairman of the board since 2020)
- Lithuanian Lawyers’ Association (Member of the Board since 2003, former President (2010-2013))

Former positions include:

- Member of the Lithuanian Bar Examination Commission (2006-2018) (chairman from 2006 to 2009)
- Member of Lithuanian Judges Candidates’ Examination Commission (2011-2013)

== Awards ==
- Chevalier dans l’Ordre des Palmes (Government of the Republic of France, 2018)
- Leadership Award (Lithuanian Business Confederation, 2015)
- Award "Best Business Solution" (Investors' Forum, 2015)

== Publications ==
  - Lietuvos Respublikos darbo kodekso komentaras (autorių kolektyvas). Vilnius: Justitia, 2003.
  - Nekrošius I., Davulis T. Problems of Collective Negotiations and Collective Agreements. Jagiellonian University Yearbook of Labour Law and Social Policy, 1998/1999, Vol. 10, p. 219–230.
  - Nekrošius I., Davulis T. Employees' Representation in Enterprises in Lithuania. East West Review of Labour Law and Social Policy. 1999, Vol. 9, No. 1, p. 59–83.
  - Das Europa-Abkommen mit Litauen und das litauische Arbeitsrecht. Zeitschrift für internationales und ausländisches Arbeitsrecht. 2002, Nr. 4. p. 391–415.
  - Socialinių partnerių vaidmuo kuriant Europos Bendrijos darbo teisės normas (The role of social partners in legislative process of European Union). Teisė, 2006, t. 58, p. 24–53.
  - Dar kartą apie nekonkuravimo susitarimus Lietuvos darbo teisėje (Non-compete agreements in Lithuanian law). Juristas, 2006, nr. 4; nr. 5, p. 3–16; 19–24.
  - Lithuanian labour market and EU enlargement. Transition Studies Review, 2006, vol. 13, no 1, p. 18–22.
  - Die Vertretung der Arbeitnehmer auf betrieblicher Ebene in Litauen. Zeitschrift fur Arbeitsrecht, 2006, Jahr. 37, Heft 3, p. 493–517.
  - Darbo ir socialinės apsaugos teisė XXI amžiuje: iššūkiai ir perspektyvos: tarptautinės mokslinės konferencijos medžiaga, 2006 m. gegužės 11-13 d. = Labour and social security law in the XXI century: challenges and perspectives. 2007, Vilnius: Teisinės informacijos centras.
  - Įmonės, įstaigos organizacijos vadovo teisinio statuso problema Lietuvos teisėje (The problem of the head of the company in Lithuanian law). Private law: past, present and future: liber amicorum Valentinas Mikelėnas. Vilnius, 2008, p. 99–116.
  - Bendrosios rinkos laisvės v. pagrindinės teisės - teisė į streiką Europos Teisingumo Teismo jurisprudencijoje (Fundamental freedoms of common market v. fundamental human rights - the right to strike in the recent case-law of the European Court of Justice). In: Teisė besikeičiančioje Europoje: Liber Amicorum Pranas Kūris. Vilnius: Mykolo Romerio universiteto leidykla, 2008, p. 131-157.
  - Lietuvos darbo teisės modernizavimo perspektyvos (The perspectives of the modernization of Lithuanian labour law). Jurisprudencija. 2008, p. 27–33.
  - Herausforderungen des litauischen Arbeitsrechts Anfang des 21. Jahrhunderts. Pracovné právo 21. storočia. Plzeň, 2009, p. 105–120.
  - Проблемы соотношения национального коллективного трудового права и права Европейского Союза. Šiuolaikinės darbo teisės ir socialinės apsaugos teisės teorinės problemos: tarptautiniai ir nacionaliniai aspektai. Vilnius, 2009, p. 160–173.
  - Litauen: Das Konzept der «universellen Arbeitnehmervertretung». In: Jansen, Peter / Seul, Otmar (Hrsg/éds). Das erweiterte Europa: Arbeitnehmerbeteiligung an der Entscheidungsfindung im Unternehmen (L'Europe élargie: la participation des salariés aux décisions dans l'entreprise). Traditionen im Westen, Innovationen im Osten? (Traditions à l'Ouest, innovations à l'Est?) Reihe: Travaux Interdisciplinaires et plurilingues Band 11, Erscheinungsjahr: 2009. Bern, Berlin, Bruxelles, Frankfurt am Main, New York, Oxford, Wien, 2009. XIV, 438 S., zahlr. Tab. und Graf, 2012, Heft 5, S.258-262.
  - European Works Counci: Lithuania. Alphen aan den Rijn: Kluwer Law International, 2013. International Encyclopaedia of Laws: Labour Law and Industrial Relations / ed. Roger Blanplain. Suppl. 396. 75 p.
  - Influence of European law on Lithuanian labour law. In: Lithuanian labour coLithuanian legal system under the influence of European Union law: collection of scientific articles on the influence of European Union law on Lithuanian constitutional, administrative and environment protection, criminal, civil and civil procedure, labour and social protection, finance law. Vilnius: Vilniaus universitetas, 2014, p. 309–340.
  - Directive 2008/95/EC: employer insolvency. In: EU labour law: a commentary / edited by: Monika Schlachter. Alphen aan den Rijn: Kluwer Law International, 2015, p. 457–489.
  - Age Discrimination and Labour Law in Lithuania. In: Age Discrimination and Labour Law. Comparative and Conceptual Perspectives in the EU and Beyond, Kluwer Law International, 2015.
  - Lithuanian labour law in the context of the EU Charter of Fundamental Rights. Studia z zakresu prawa pracy i polityki społecznej. Kraków: Uniwersytet Jagielloński, 2016. p. 291–312.
  - New forms of employment in Lithuania. In: New forms of employment in Europe. Alphen aan den Rijn: Wolters Kluwer, 2016, 2016. p. 115–143.
  - The concept of 'employee': the position in Lithuania. In: Restatement of labour law in Europe. Vol. I: The concept of employee / edited by Berndt Waas, Guus Heerma van Voss. Oxford: Hart Publishing, 2017, 2017. p. 391–404.
  - Darbo teisės rekodifikavimas Lietuvoje 2016–2017 m. [archive] Teisė. Vilnius: Vilniaus universiteto leidykla. 2017, T. 104. p. 7-27.
  - Lithuanian Public Law. In: The Law of the Baltic States / Editors: Tanel Kerikmäe, Kristi Joamets, Jānis Pleps, Anita Rodiņa, Tomas Berkmanas, Edita Gruodytė (bendraautorius). Cham: Springer International Publishing Switzerland, 2017, 2017. p. 407–470.
  - Lietuvos teisė (Lithuanian law) 1918 – 2018 m.: šimtmečio patirtis ir perspektyvos (bendraautorius). Vilnius: Mykolo Romerio universitetas, 2017. 888 p.
  - Davulis T. (ed.) Labour law reforms in Eastern and Western Europe [archive], Peter Lang, 2017.
  - Davulis T. Lietuvos Respublikos darbo kodekso komentaras (Commentary of the Labour Code of the Republic of Lithuania), Registrų centras, 2018, 717 p.
  - Uber and taxis: a comparative law study in Lithuania. In: Uber and taxis: comparative law studies (Eds.Rozen Noguellou, David Renders), Larcier, 2018, p. 293-308.
  - Reform des Arbeitsrechts in Litauen: Ein Beispiel des Liberalismus oder die Suche nach Gleichgewicht? Europäische Zeitschrift für Arbeitsrecht. München: Verlag C.H. Beck. 2018
  - Dismissal Protection – the position in Lithuania. In: Restatement of labour law in Europe. Vol. III: Dismissal Protection (Eds. Bernd Waas, Guus Heerma van Voss). Oxford: Hart Publishing, 2020.
  - Article 10 TFEU: Commentary. In: The Treaty on Functioning of European Union (TFEU): A Commentary (Eds. H.-J. Blanke, S. Mangiameli). Wien: Springer, 2021.
  - Savarankiškai dirbančių asmenų teisė į kolektyvines derybas ir teisė į streiką (The right of self-employed to collective bargaining and the right to strike). In: Darbo teisė besikeičiančiame pasaulyje. Liber Amicorum Genovaitė Dambrauskienė, Vilnius, 2021.
  - The public servants and the right to information and consultation. In: Selected papers on occasion of 20th anniversary of the Supreme Administrative Court of Lithuania, Vilnius, 2022.
