= Juozas Žilys =

Lithuanian lawyer and judge (1942–2024)

Member of the Constitutional Court of Lithuania
- In office 1993–1999

Personal details
- Born: 7 September 1942 Jurbarkas, Reichskommissariat Ostland
- Died: 7 September 2024 (aged 82) Vilnius, Lithuania
- Education: Vilnius State University
- Occupation: Lawyer, judge

Juozas Žilys (7 September 1942 – 7 September 2024) was a Lithuanian lawyer and judge. He served in the Constitutional Court from 1993 to 1999.

Žilys died in Vilnius on 7 September 2024, his 82nd birthday.
