= Valstybė =

Business and politics magazine in Lithuania

- Managing editor: Aušra Radzevičiūtė
- Categories: Business magazine Political magazine
- Frequency: Monthly
- Founded: 2007
- Company: Demokratijos plėtros fondas
- Country: Lithuania
- Based in: Vilnius
- Language: Lithuanian
- Website: http://www.valstybe.eu/
- ISSN: 1822-6574

Valstybė (lith. for Nation, State) is a Lithuanian monthly business and political magazine based in Vilnius.

== History and profile ==
Valstybė was launched in 2007. The magazine includes reviews, economical predictions, investment suggestions and interviews. The publisher is VšĮ Demokratijos plėtros fondas. It is based in Vilnius and is published on a monthly basis. The magazine has a liberal stance.

Since 2010 the magazine names the person of the year. It organizes economics conferences. In July 2011, the company announce plans to publish the magazine in Estonian and Latvian. The same year the editor-in-chief of Valstybė, Darius Varanavičius, was fired following his support for a right-wing extremist party in local elections.

In 2010 Valstybė sold 10,454 copies.
