= Civil Code of Lithuania =

Civil Code of the Republic of Lithuania (Lithuanian: Lietuvos Respublikos civilinis kodeksas, abbreviated as LR CK) is the Civil Code of Lithuania. It came into effect on 1 July 2001 and was considered a major reform.

== Content ==
The Civil Code governs property relationships and personal non-property relationships related with the aforesaid relations, as well as family relationships. In the cases provided for by laws, other personal non-property relationships likewise are regulated by this Code.

The provisions established by this Code apply to property relationships based on the legal subordination of persons to state institutions and directly resultant from their exercise of functions of state power (realization of subordination), or from the performance of persons’ obligations established by laws towards the state, or from the infliction of administrative or criminal sanctions established by laws, including relationships in the field of taxation and other obligatory payments or dues to the state or to its institutions, also in the field of the state budget, as well as to any other relationships governed by the provisions of public law to the extent that these relationships are not regulated by the relevant laws, also in the cases when it is expressly prescribed by this Code.

The Civil Code governs labour relationships given (only if) they are not regulated by the Labour Code of the Republic of Lithuania or other labour laws.

== See also ==
- Criminal Code of Lithuania
