= Law Institute of Lithuania =

Lithuanian research institute

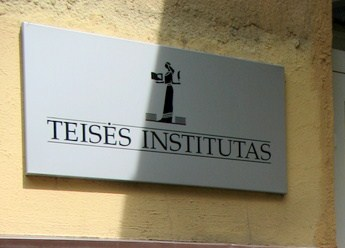
Institute

The Institute of Law (Lithuanian: Teisės institutas) is a law research establishment, founded in 1991 by the Government of the Republic of Lithuania seeking to coordinate the reform of the legal system and law institutions, to combine it with the economic and social reorganization carried in the country. The founder of the Institute is the Ministry of Justice of the Republic of Lithuania. The main areas of research interests of the Law Institute are as follows: public law (paying most attention to the problems of criminal law, constitutional law and criminal justice) and criminology.

== Functions ==
The Institute performs the following functions while trying to achieve its aims:

- Carries the applied scientific researches of the legal system;
- Collects, analyses, systematizes and provides the state institutions with the legal and criminological information;
- Carries the legal and criminological expertise of laws and other legal acts as well as draft legal acts.

== Governance ==
Past acting directors:

- 1991–1992 Juozas Galginaitis
- 1992-2002 Antanas Dapšys
- 2002-2009 Algimantas Čepas
- 2009-2010 Petras Ragauskas
- 2010-2012 Algimantas Čepas
- 2012-2013: Margarita Dobrynina
- 2013: Algimantas Čepas
- since 2014: Jurgita Paužaitė-Kulvinskienė
