= Jonas Prapiestis =

Lithuanian politician (born 1952)

Jonas Prapiestis (born 2 August 1952) is a Lithuanian judge, Professor of criminal law and politician, born in Kupiškis. In 1990 he was among those who signed the Act of the Re-Establishment of the State of Lithuania.

== Biography ==
Jonas Prapiestis graduated the law faculty of Vilnius University in 1975 and has worked as a lecturer in the Department of the Criminal Law of the Faculty.

He worked as a judge in the field of Criminal law and Criminal procedure at Lietuvos Aukščiausiasis Teismas.
