= Vilenas Vadapalas =

Lithuanian lawyer

Vilenas Vadapalas (born 1954) is a Lithuanian lawyer. He became the first representative of Lithuania at the Court of First Instance (now called the General Court) of the European Union, when he was appointed in 2004. Vadapalas specializes in the fields of public international law, law of the European Union, and international human rights law.

Vadapalas graduated from the law faculty of Vilnius University. He obtained his doctorate degree from the University of Moscow and habilitated doctorate from the University of Warsaw. Vadapalas worked as professor of international law at Vilnius University. He published several textbooks for law students, including Tarptautinė teisė (1998 and 2006).

He works since October 2016 by Advokatų kontora Vadapalas, Vaitekūnas ir partneriai EUROLEX.
