= Constitution of Lithuania =

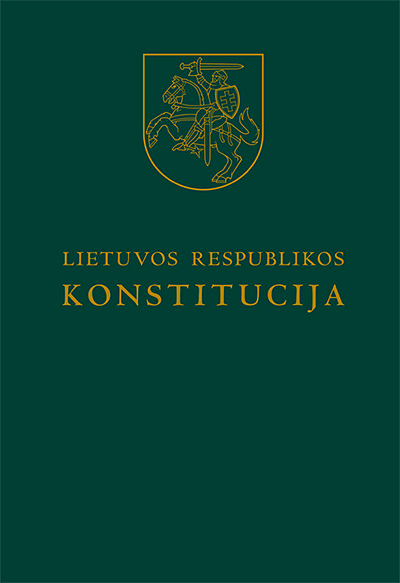

Overview
- Original title: (in Lithuanian) Lietuvos Respublikos Konstitucija
- Jurisdiction: Republic of Lithuania
- Date effective: 25 October 1992; 33 years ago
- System: Unitary semi-presidential republic

Government structure
- Branches: Three (executive, legislature and judiciary)
- Head of state: President of Lithuania
- Chambers: Seimas
- Executive: Cabinet of ministers led by the Prime Minister
- Judiciary: Constitutional Court, Supreme Court, Appeal Court of Lithuania, district courts and local courts
- Supersedes: 1990 Temporary Basic Law

Full text
- Constitution of Lithuania at Wikisource

The Constitution of the Republic of Lithuania (Lithuanian: Lietuvos Respublikos Konstitucija) defines the legal foundation for all laws passed in the Republic of Lithuania. The first constitution of the contemporary republic was enacted on 1 August 1922. The current constitution was adopted in a referendum on 25 October 1992.

== History ==
=== Statutes of Lithuania ===
The first attempt to codify the laws of Grand Duchy of Lithuania took the form of Statutes of Lithuania, with the First Statute in power in 1529. The document, written in Ruthenian language, fulfilled the role of the supreme law of the land, even including provisions that no other law could contradict it.

=== Constitution of 3 May 1791 ===
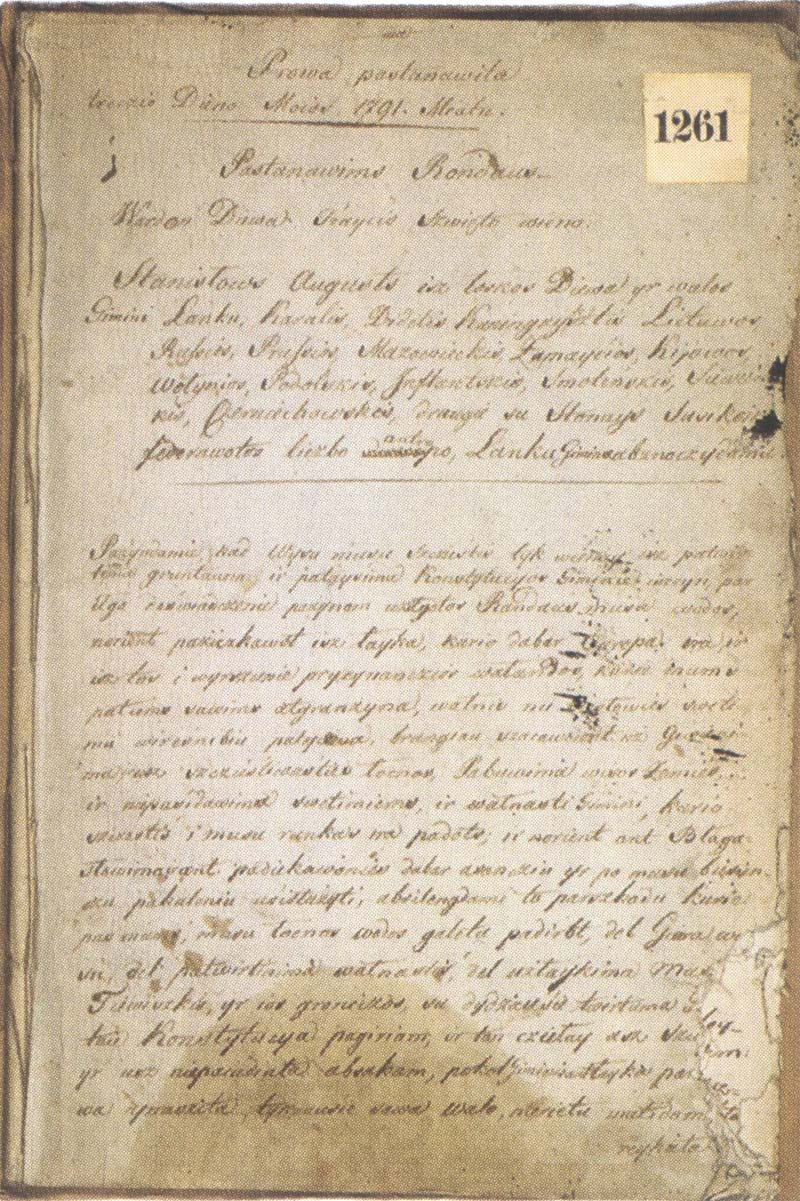
Constitution of 3 May 1791 in Lithuanian language

In the 18th century the Polish–Lithuanian Commonwealth, a federal entity consisting of the Grand Duchy of Lithuania and the Crown of the Kingdom of Poland, faced a period of decline due to increasingly dysfunctional internal politics. In a belated attempt to rectify the situation, a constitution was adopted on May 3, 1791 – one of the oldest codified national constitutions in the world.

The new constitution abolished the liberum veto and banned the szlachta's confederations, features that had crippled decision making in the state. The constitution also provided for a separation of powers among legislative, executive and judicial branches of government, established "popular sovereignty" and extended political rights to the bourgeoisie. The peasantry saw their rights increased but it fell short of abolishing serfdom, which was reconfirmed. Religious tolerance was preserved, although the status of the Catholic faith was recognized.

Reciprocal Guarantee of Two Nations of 22 October 1791 accompanied the constitution, affirming the unity and indivisibility of Poland and the Grand Duchy of Lithuania within a single state and their equal representation in state-governing bodies.

The 1791 document remained in force for less than 19 months; after a brief war with Russia, it was annulled by the Grodno Sejm on 23 November 1793. By 1795, the Commonwealth was partitioned between Russian Empire, Kingdom of Prussia and Habsburg Austria, with most of the lands of the Grand Duchy under the Russian rule.

=== Interwar constitutions ===
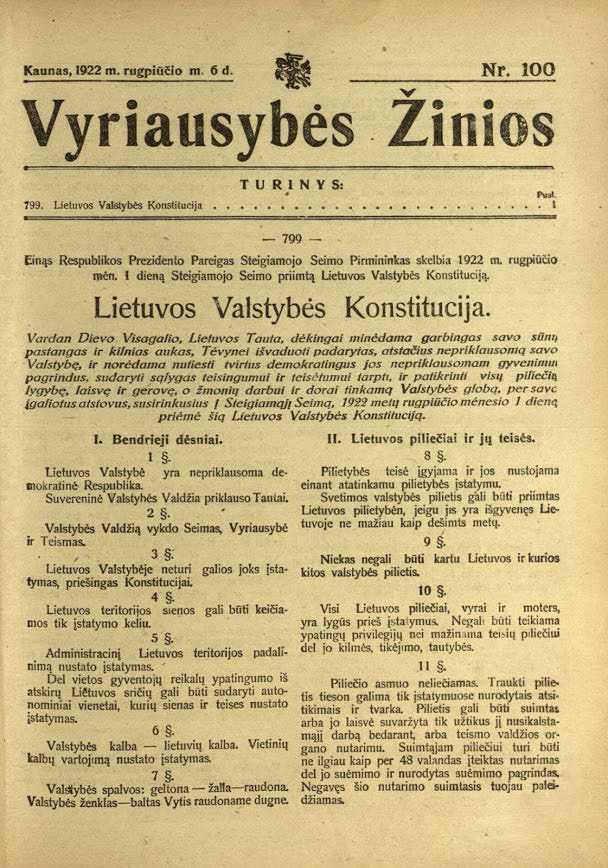
1922 Constitution of Lithuania, printed in the 6 August 1922 edition of the Vyriausybės Žinios newspaper

During the closing stages of World War I, Lithuania declared independence on 16 February 1918. Three separate temporary constitutions were enacted on 2 November 1918, 4 April 1919 and 10 June 1920.

On 2 November 1918, the State Council adopted a constitutional act. At the time, it was still constrained by the decision of 11 July 1918, declaring Lithuania a constitutional monarchy, with close ties to Germany. In a changing environment, the council chose to adopt the constitutional act without specifying the form of government or the head of state, leaving the decisions to the Constituent Assembly (Steigiamasis Seimas).

On 4 April 1919, the State Council adopted modified Fundamental Principles of Temporary Constitution. The modifications were mainly notable for the introduction of the office of the President, in place of the Presidium of the Council. Once assembled, the Constituent Assembly adopted another temporary constitutional act on 10 June 1920, confirming Lithuania as a parliamentary republic and providing the framework and limits to its own powers.

The first permanent constitution of the Republic of Lithuania was adopted by the Constituent Assembly on 1 August 1922. It was a democratic constitution and resembled contemporary Western European constitutions, enshrining the main rights and freedoms of the people, political freedoms, political pluralism and a mechanism for democratic elections. The constitution envisioned a strong parliament (the Seimas) and a politically weakened president as the head of state.

A coup on 17 December 1926 started the process of transforming the Republic of Lithuania into an authoritarian state headed by Antanas Smetona as the President. The constitution of 1922 was disregarded as early as 12 April 1927, when the President dissolved the Seimas without announcing a new election. A constitutional reform was proposed, strengthening the authority of the President and weakening the parliament.

A new constitution was proclaimed by Smetona in May 1928 without any attempt to follow the procedure for changing the Constitution established in the 1922 document (which would have required the assent of the Seimas). Instead, the constitution was presented as a "proposal" to the nation, to be approved within 10 years, although this provision was not considered meaningful. The constitution maintained a parliament, but assigned all of its functions, such as enacting laws, ratifying treaties, as well as drafting and executing the budget, to the President when the parliament was not in session. The Seimas would not reconvene until 1936.

The constitution of 1928 was never submitted for approval to the nation. Instead, the government started working on a new constitution, approved by the newly assembled Seimas in 1938 (opposition was not allowed to stand for election). The constitution retained the overall authoritarian character of the 1928 document, and declared that the state was the foundation of existence of its citizens and not the other way round. The constitution did away with the separation of powers, stating that state power was "undividable" and led by the President, with the Seimas, Government and courts subordinate to him.

In 1940, Lithuania was invaded and occupied by the Soviet Union. Ironically, the constitution of 1938 assisted the Soviets in legitimizing their actions by concentrating the power in the hands of the President, the post that was de facto taken over by Justas Paleckis. In 1940 and 1978, new constitutions of Lithuanian SSR were adopted, based on the Soviet constitutions of 1936 and 1977, respectively.

== Modern constitution ==
=== Onset ===
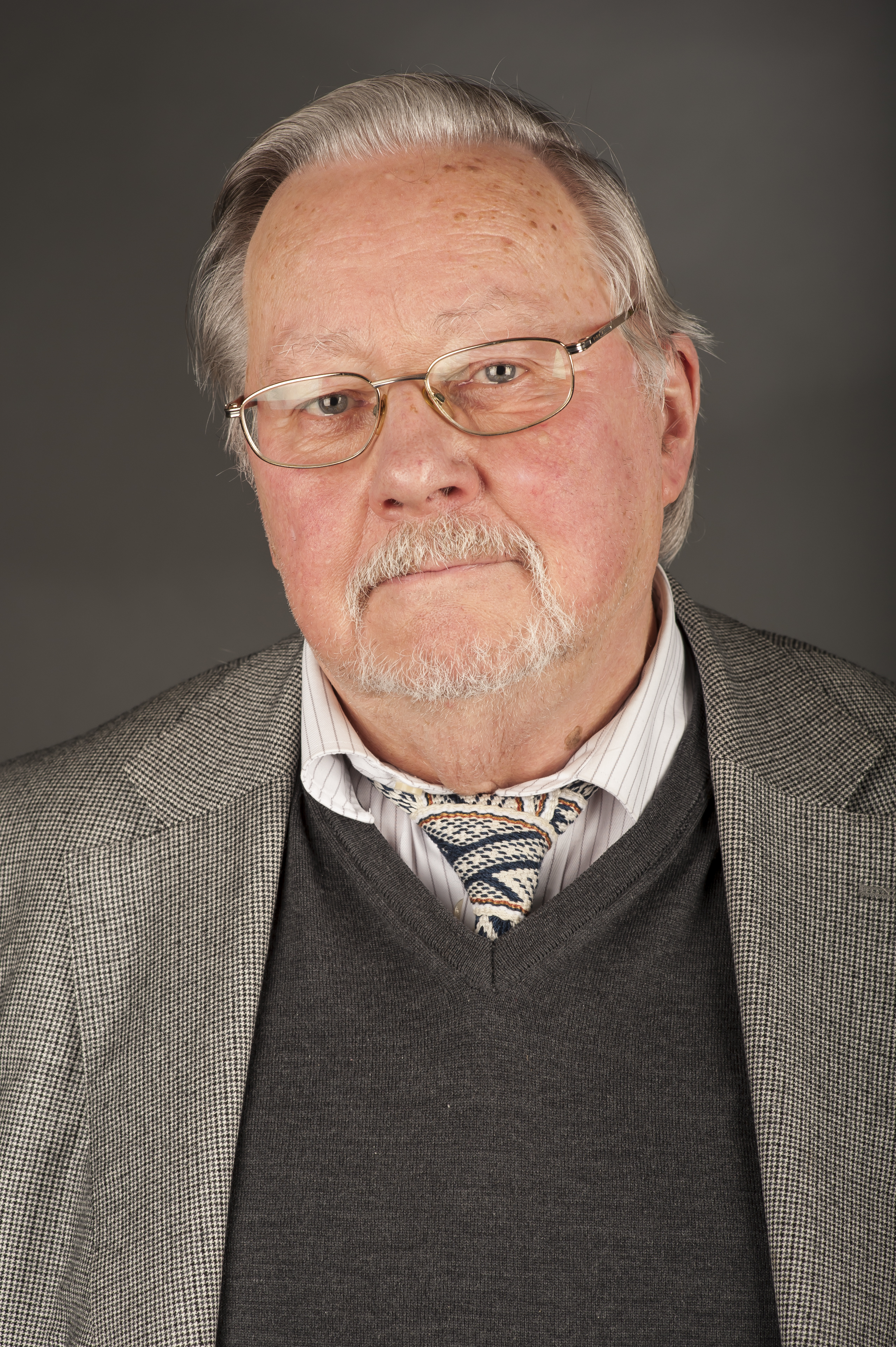
Vytautas Landsbergis, the chairman of the Supreme Council

On 11 March 1990, Lithuania declared independence from the Soviet Union, emphasizing restoration and the legal continuity of the interwar-period Republic of Lithuania. On the same day, the 1938 Constitution of Lithuania was restored for a brief period, but subsequently suspended and replaced with the Provisional Basic Law.

The Provisional Basic Law established a framework for the new state, guaranteeing democratic rights and establishing rules of democratic process. However, the government was structured similarly to its Soviet predecessor: legislative and executive functions were combined under the parliament (Supreme Council, Lithuanian: Aukščiausioji Taryba), and the judiciary branch was not independent. The government functions were performed by the presidium of the Supreme Council and the chairman of the presidium became the chairman of the parliament and the Head of State. It was a transitional system, as the Provisional Basic Law did not reflect the changing economic and social relations and the evolving demands of the society and the state. Also over one-third of the Law was amended in a period of two years.

Over the next two years, work on a new constitution was done, with independent drafts prepared in 1990 and 1991. At the end of 1991, the Supreme Council established a commission tasked to prepare a draft constitution. The resulting proposal was approved by the Supreme Council on 21 April 1992, and presented to the public. An alternative draft constitution was prepared by a coalition led by Sąjūdis. The main difference between the two proposals was the balance between the various branches of government. The proposal approved by the Supreme Council envisioned a parliamentary system, while the alternative proposal suggested a presidential model. The final document represented a compromise between a purely parliamentary system and a presidential one.

=== Adoption ===
The new constitution was approved by the Supreme Council in October 1992 and submitted to popular vote. The constitution was approved in a referendum on 25 October 1992. Seventy-five per cent of those voting (57% of all eligible voters) voted in favor of adopting the document, with a turnout of 75.3%.

=== Contents ===
National flag and civil ensign. Flag ratio: 3:5

The Constitution of 1992 reflects the combined influence of the institutions and experiences of Western democracies as well as the Lithuanian tradition. Introductory provisions of the document (Chapter I) contain the fundamental principles of the State, placing high value on democracy, but also asserting the collective and individual right of defence against attempts by force to encroach upon "independence, territorial integrity, or constitutional order of the State". The provisions also disallow division of Lithuanian territory into any "state derivatives" — a reference to territorial autonomy as a solution to ethnic minority problems in the country. Article 150 of the constitution incorporates a constitutional act "On the Non-Alignment of the Republic of Lithuania with Post-Soviet Eastern Alliances", effectively prohibiting the membership in the Commonwealth of Independent States and similar structures. The very same article includes "The Constitutional Act of the Republic of Lithuania on membership of the Republic of Lithuania in the European Union", which recognises Lithuania as a member of the European Union.

==== Human rights ====
Fundamental human rights and democratic values, including freedom of "thought, faith, and conscience," are enshrined in the constitution, which also guarantees the status of legal person to religious denominations and allows religious teaching in public schools. In addition to personal, political, and religious rights, the constitution secures social rights. As already noted, these include free medical care, old-age pensions, unemployment compensation, and support for families and children.

==== Government ====
The power to govern is divided between the legislative and executive branches, with an independent judiciary acting as interpreter of the constitution and of the branches' jurisdictions, as well as arbiter of conflicts between them. The constitution clearly acknowledges the danger of concentration of power in a single person or institution. The legislature has regained its old name, Seimas, which was used in the interwar years. The executive consists of a president and a prime minister with a cabinet, known as the Government (executive only; Lithuanian: Vyriausybė). The judiciary is composed of the Supreme Court and subordinate courts (the Court of Appeals, district courts, and local courts). The Constitutional Court of the Republic of Lithuania, which decides on the constitutionality of acts of the Seimas, the President, and the Government, is an institution of the judiciary, completely independent from other courts. The Office of the Procurator General is an autonomous institution of the judiciary. Creation of special courts, such as administrative or family courts, is allowed, although establishing courts with "special powers" is forbidden in peacetime.

==== Parliament ====
Seimas Palace

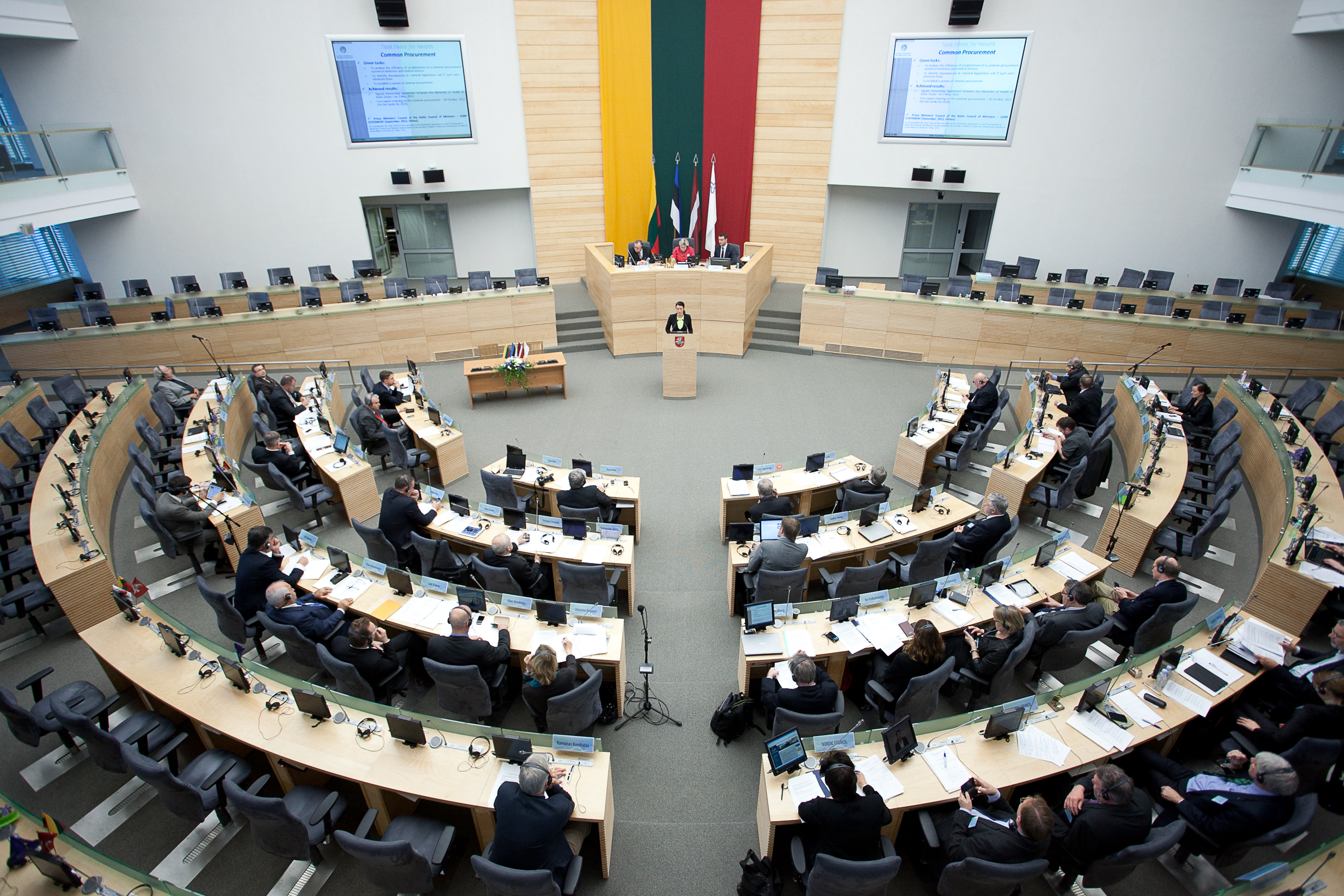
Seimas, the parliament of Lithuania

The parliament of Lithuania is a unicameral legislature called the Seimas. The Seimas consists of 141 members, seventy elected from party lists on the basis of proportional representation and seventy-one from single-member districts. To be seated in the Seimas on the basis of proportional representation, a party must receive at least 5 per cent of the votes cast. The legislature is elected for four years. Candidates for the legislature must be at least twenty-five years old. Members of the Seimas may serve as prime ministers or Cabinet members, but they may not hold any other position in either central or local government or in private enterprises or organizations. The parliament must approve the prime minister and the cabinet, composed by the ministers — and also the prime minister, as well as their government programme. It also may force the government's resignation by rejecting twice in sequence its programme or by voting, in a secret ballot, to express its lack of confidence in the government.

The powers of the legislature are checked by a number of devices: first, by certain constitutional limitations; second, by the president as defined under the constitution; and third, by the Constitutional Court. Articles 64, 131, and 132 of the constitution circumscribe the ability of the Seimas to control the Government, especially the budget. Article 64 specifies the times of parliamentary sessions. Although extension is possible, ordinarily the legislature cannot sit longer than seven months and three days, divided into two sessions. The budget submitted by the Government can be increased by the legislature only if the latter indicates the sources of financing for additional expenditures. If the budget is not approved before the start of the budget year, proposed expenditures cannot be higher than those of the previous year. Finally, the legislature is not entrusted with making decisions concerning the basic characteristics of Lithuanian statehood and democracy. These are left to the citizens by means of referendum. Similarly, the initiative for making laws is not limited to the legislature but also belongs to the citizens, who can force the legislature to consider a law by submitting a petition with 50,000 signatures.

==== President ====
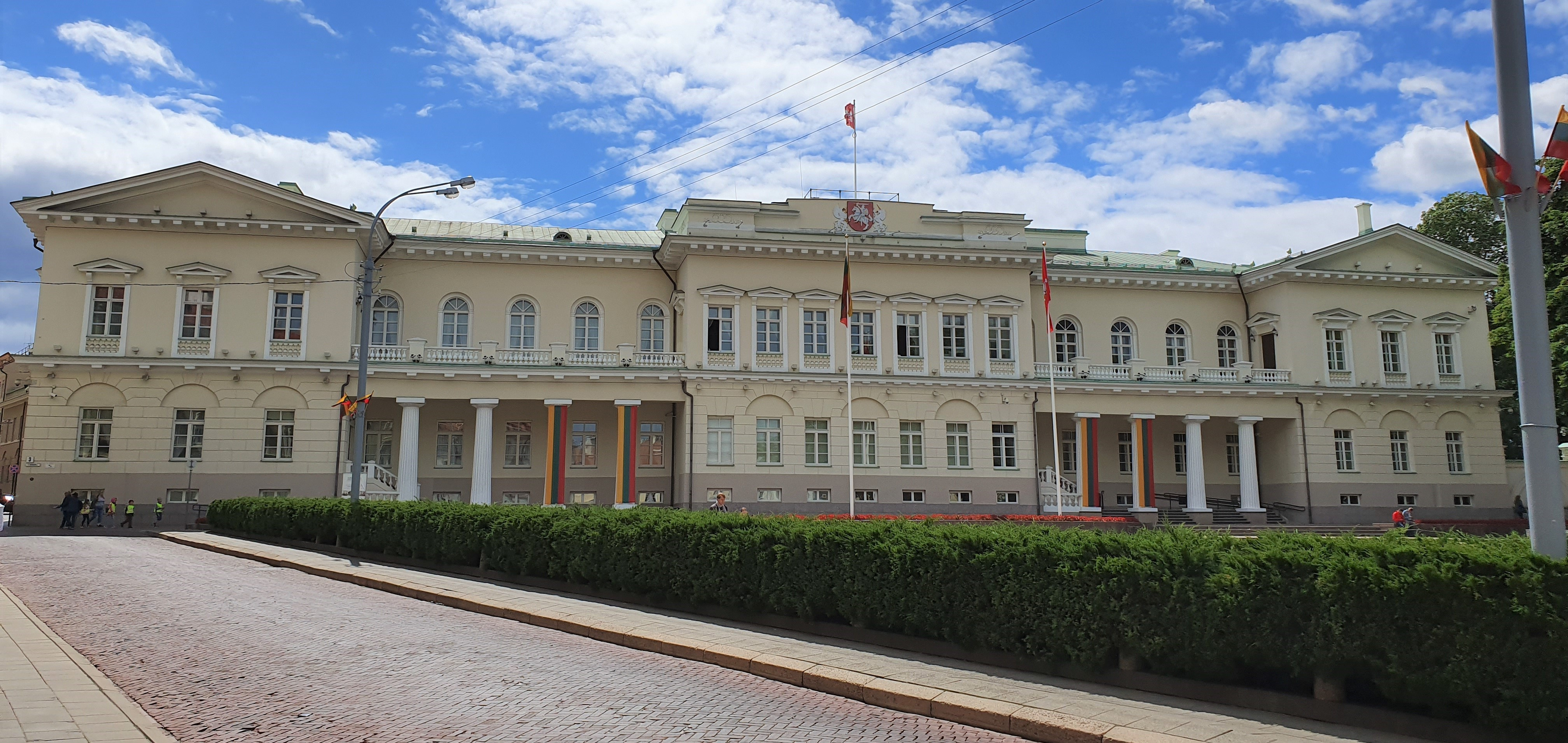
Presidential Palace in Vilnius

The powers of the legislature are further checked by those of the president, who may veto legislation, both ordinary and constitutional, passed by the legislature. Laws are not promulgated without the signature of the President. A presidential veto can be overridden, but only by an absolute majority of the Seimas' membership. The President can also dissolve the Parliament if it refuses to approve the government's budget within sixty days or if it directly votes no confidence in the government. However, the next elected Parliament may retaliate by calling for an earlier presidential election.

The president is directly elected by the people for a term of five years and a maximum of two consecutive terms. The president is not, strictly speaking, the sole chief of the executive branch or the chief administrator. The Lithuanians borrowed the French model of the presidency, then adapted it to their needs. Candidates must be at least forty years old. To be elected in the first round, a candidate must win more than half of the total votes cast, with 50 per cent of the electorate participating. If fewer than 50 percent of the electorate turns out, a candidate can win in the first round with a plurality if he or she wins at least one-third of the total vote. If the first round does not produce a president, a second round is held within two weeks between the two top candidates, in which a plurality is sufficient to win.

The president is the head of state. The president also selects the prime minister and names the Cabinet on his or her advice (the prime minister and their Cabinet are subject to approval by the Seimas), approves ministerial candidates, and appoints the commander-in-chief of the armed forces — with parliament's consent. The President resolves basic foreign policy issues and can confer military and diplomatic ranks, appoint diplomats without legislative approval, and issue decrees subject to the legislature's right to later overturn a decree by legislative action. Generally, the president has greater power in foreign policy than domestic policy.

Finally, the president has considerable powers to influence the judicial branch. The president has the right to nominate (and the Seimas to approve the nomination of) three justices to the Constitutional Court and all justices to the Supreme Court. The president also appoints, with legislative approval, judges of the Court of Appeals. However, the parliament's consent is not required for the appointment or transfer of judges in local, district, and special courts.

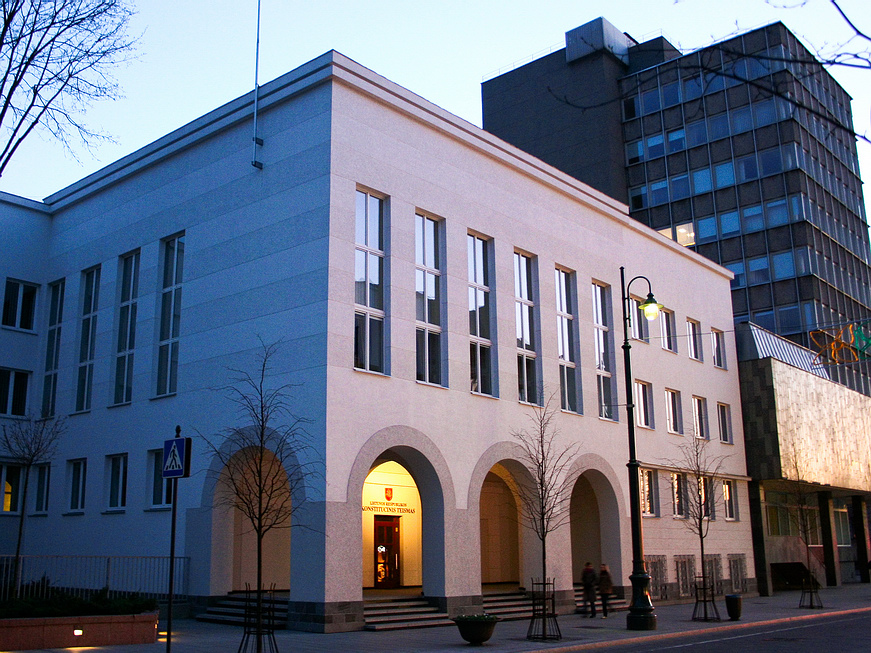
The Constitutional Court's palace

==== Constitutional Court ====
The Constitutional Court checks both the legislative and the executive branches of government by ruling on whether their legislation and/or actions are constitutional. The court consists of nine justices appointed by the legislature, three each from the nominees of the president, the parliamentary chairman, and the Chief Justice of the Supreme Court. The president nominates the Chief Justice of the Constitutional Court. Cases for consideration by the Constitutional Court, however, may be brought only by one-fifth of the membership of the Seimas, the ordinary courts, or the President of the Republic.

== See also ==
- Law of Lithuania
