= Mykolas Romeris University =

Public university in Lithuania

- Mykolo Romerio universitetas
- Type: Public university
- Established: 1990; 36 years ago
- Rector: Inga Žalėnienė
- Administrative staff: 680
- Students: 7,500 (2020)
- Doctoral students: 183
- Location: Vilnius, Kaunas, Marijampolė, Lithuania
- Website: www.mruni.eu

University rankings

Regional – Overall
- QS Emerging Europe and Central Asia: 137 (2022)

Mykolas Romeris University (MRU) is the largest specialized university for social sciences and humanities in Lithuania located in Vilnius, Kaunas and Marijampolė. It is named after the patriarch of Lithuania's Constitutional Law Professor Mykolas Romeris (1880-1945).

MRU offers a wide range of social science study programs, making up 95% of its entire academic portfolio (according to the AIKOS database).

The university is one of the most international higher education institutions in Lithuania, welcoming students from over 40 countries and being an active participant in the Erasmus+ programme. MRU is also a member of the European Reform University Alliance (ERUA), collaborating with more than 200 international partners.

MRU's strategy is based on three pillars:

- Global citizenship education.
- Value-driven research.
- Societal impact.

The university actively contributes to scientific research, social innovation, and sustainable development.

== History ==
After the restoration of independence of Lithuania, the parliament established the Lithuanian Police Academy on the basis of three law enforcement training facilities located in Vilnius and Kaunas and called the new institution Lithuanian police academy. As the University added new study programs, focused on training officials other than police officers the University has changed its title to Lithuanian Law Academy (in 1997), and Lithuanian Law University (in 2000). In 2004 the University was named after professor Mykolas Romeris.

In 2023, Mykolas Romeris University became a member of the European Reform University Alliance (ERUA).

In 2024, Marijampolė College joined Mykolas Romeris University and became its fifth faculty – the Sudovian Academy.

== Structure ==
The founder of the university is Seimas of the Republic of Lithuania.

The management bodies of the university are University Council, the University Senate and the University Rector.

Mykolas Romeris University consists of: 4 faculties, Mykolas Romeris Law School and Public Security Academy. It offers more than 90 programmes at the Bachelor's, Master's, and Doctoral levels in Lithuanian and English languages. Studies are carried out in compliance to the major principles of Bologna process. The major fields of study are Business, Communication, Economics, Educology, Finance, History, Management, Informatics, Law, Management, Philology, Philosophy, Political Sciences, Psychology, Public Administration, Public Security, Social Work, and Sociology.

=== Faculties ===
- Faculty of Human and Social Sciences
- Faculty of Public Governance and Business
- Public Security Academy
- Law School
- Sudovian Academy

=== Administration units ===
- Academic Affairs Centre
  - Career Centre
  - Digital Studies Unit
  - Qualification Improvement and Recognition of Competencies Department
- Library
- Research and Innovation Support Centre
  - Research Quality and Analysis Office
  - Social Innovations Doctoral School
  - Research Communication Division
  - Knowledge and Technologies Transfer Office
  - Projects Office
- International Office
- Asian Centre

Asian Centre MRU was established in April 2013 and it focuses on cooperation with Japan, South Korea, China and India. It also offers Korean, Chinese and Japanese language courses free of charge.

- King Sejong Institute

Vilnius King Sejong Institute (KSI) at MRU promotes cultural understanding Lithuania - S. Korea through Korean language, culture, economics and politics courses. KSI teaches Korean language and culture to foreigners who want to learn Korean as a second language or a foreign language.

- Francophone Studies Centre
- Chancellery Office
  - Document Office
  - Legal Office
  - Personnel Office
- Artistic Education Centre
- Property Management Office
  - Building Management and Maintenance Division
  - Service Unit
- IT Centre
- Health and Sports Centre

== Studies ==
Mykolas Romeris University offers the possibility to choose international joint study programmes leading to double diplomas. Joint programmes are offered in cooperation with Universities from France, Austria, Finland, even South Korea.

About 500 University students each year participate in international exchange (studies and internships) via Erasmus, Nordplus or other international programmes.

A Lithuanian degree diploma is recognized in all the countries which have signed the Lisbon Convention - signed by 50 countries and international organizations. That means students can be sure that their qualifications gained in Lithuania will be valid in all these countries.

== Research ==
MRU carries out fundamental and applied research, takes part in national and international research programmes and projects, engages in contracted research, implements Ph.D. studies, organizes academic and mobility events, and widely disseminates research results. MRU research and innovation is carried out in the framework of the interdisciplinary priority research area Social Innovations for Global Growth and 5 research programmes: Justice, Security and Human Rights; Social Technologies; Sustainable Growth in the Context of Globalization; Improving the Quality of Life and Advancing Employment Opportunities; Continuity and Change of Values in Global Society. Each year MRU organizes over 100 academic events: conferences, seminars, workshops, trainings, etc.

Since 2013 aiming to popularize interdisciplinary research results and involve society in research processes, a cycle of public lectures Research Café were carried out attracting researchers, students, partners and other stakeholders. For example, past Research Café events in the area of energy include Management of Renewable Energy Resources (leader - assoc. prof. dr. A.Stasiukynas), Does Lithuania need a Nuclear Power Plant? (leader - prof. dr. D. Štreimiekienė).

Educational events targeted at different groups of society also take place at the university. For example, such events as Test the Profession, Become a Student for One Day or 10 MRU academies targeted at high school students could also be mentioned. Summer schools can serve as another vehicle of science communication. The most significant annual summer schools include Transparency School (held in partnership with Transparency International), International School on Human Rights (held in partnership with French, German, British, Polish, Italian universities, co-funded by the Europe for Citizens Programme of the European Union), Science and Art of Communication, etc. Saturday schools as for instance, Mediation School, attracting numerous members of the society has been organized at MRU.

== Internationalization ==
Currently MRU has over 700 of international students with majority of students coming from Ukraine, Turkey, France, Germany, Italy, Spain. Every semester number of International degree seeking students and exchange students (under Erasmus+ and bilateral agreements) is growing.

== Campus ==
MRU's Central Campus is located in the Northern part of Vilnius, surrounded by the park:

- It takes approximately 25 minutes to reach city center by bus.
- Accommodation on campus is offered for all international students, in a triple or double room.
- University offers dining hall and cafeterias where it is possible to have breakfast, lunch or dinner.
- University Library and lecture halls are located 5 minutes' walk from Students House.

== Sports ==
Mykolas Romeris University's students are encouraged to engage in an active lifestyle on campus through organized activities and individual health promotion. New athletic halls for gymnastics, games and table tennis have been set up.

- MRU was a partner of EuroBasket 2011, holding practices of all the top 8 teams.
- Mykolas Romeris University has been cultivating the Olympic spirit for a long time, and as a proof of that on December 1, 2010, the Lithuanian National Olympic Committee (LNOC) awarded the Rector of Mykolas Romeris University, Prof. Dr. Alvydas Pumputis, with LNOC's Honorary Medal for the University's contribution to sports. Artūras Poviliūnas, the President of Lithuanian National Olympic Committee, said that athletes at this University have the best study conditions, which highly contribute to their possibilities for reaching Olympic heights.

=== Olympic medallists ===
- 2016 Summer Olympics in Rio de Janeiro: MRU students Mindaugas Griškonis and Saulius Ritter won a silver medal in the Rowing Men's Double Sculls.
- 2012 Summer Olympics in London: MRU alumni Laura Asadauskaitė-Zadneprovskienė won a gold medal in pentathlon, MRU student Jevgenij Šuklin won a silver medal in the Men's Canoe Single's Finals 200 m event.
- 2008 Summer Olympics in Beijing: MRU students Edvinas Krungolcas and Andrejus Zadneprovskis were silver and bronze medal in pentathlon.
- 2004 Summer Olympics in Athens: MRU student Andrejus Zadneprovskis won a silver medal in pentathlon.

=== Other athletes ===
- MRU student Giedrius Titenis is a two-time Olympic swimmer, who won a bronze medal in the 2009 World Aquatics Championship.
- MRU student Andrej Olijnik participated in the 2016 Olympics, and won a silver medal in the 2011 ICF Canoe Sprint World Championships.

== Alumni ==
- Laura Asadauskaitė – pentathlete
- Ewelina Dobrowolska – Minister of Justice of Lithuania
