= List of newspapers in Lithuania =

Below is a list of newspapers published in Lithuania. In 2006 there were 334 newspapers published.

== National newspapers ==
This is the list of national daily newspapers:

- Lietuvos rytas
- Lietuvos žinios
- Lithuania Tribune
- Respublika
- Vakaro žinios
- Verslo žinios

== Regional newspapers ==
=== Alytus ===
- Alytaus Naujienos

=== Kaunas ===
- 15 minučių Kaunas
- Kauno diena
- Laikinoji Sostinė

=== Klaipėda ===
- 15 minučių Klaipėda (free)
- Klaipėda
- Vakarų ekspresas

=== Panevėžys ===
- Panevėžio balsas
- Panevėžio rytas
- Panevėžio kraštas
- Sekundė

=== Šiauliai ===
- Šiaulių kraštas
- Šiaulių naujienos

=== Vilnius ===
- 15 minučių Vilnius (free)
- Kurier Wileński (in Polish)
- Sostinė
- Vilniaus diena

== Other ==
- Tėviškės žinios
- Voruta
