= Vilnius Brigade =

Lithuanian organized crime syndicate active in the 1980s and 1990s

- Vilniaus brigada
- Founded: c. 1987
- Founded by: Boris Dekanidze and Georgijus Dekanidzė
- Founding location: Vilnius, Lithuanian SSR, Soviet Union
- Years active: 1987–1995
- Territory: Lithuania (primarily Vilnius), with operations and ties in Poland, Germany, Russia, and the United States
- Ethnicity: Lithuanians, Russians, Soviet Jews, Poles
- Leaders: Boris Dekanidze †; Georgijus Dekanidzė †; Igoris Tiomkinas †
- Criminal activities: Extortion, racketeering, contract killing, grand theft auto, drug trafficking, arms trafficking, smuggling, kidnapping, fraud
- Rivals: "Greens" (Žalieji)

The Vilnius Brigade (Lithuanian: Vilniaus brigada; Russian: Вильнюсская бригада) was the most powerful organized crime syndicate in Lithuania during the late 1980s and early-to-mid 1990s. Operating predominantly out of the capital city of Vilnius, the multi-ethnic group engaged in protection rackets, extortion, auto theft, cross-border smuggling, arms and narcotics trafficking, and the manipulation of state voucher privatization during Lithuania's transition to a market economy.

During the post-Soviet transition—an era frequently referred to as the "wild nineties"—the Brigade reached its peak in 1992–1993. It wielded substantial influence over Lithuanian business and politics, openly boasting in the national press that it controlled the city. The syndicate's downfall began with the October 1993 contract killing of investigative journalist Vitas Lingys, who had published exposés detailing the syndicate's extortion rings and political ties. The murder provoked nationwide outrage and prompted an aggressive state crackdown. Syndicate leader Boris Dekanidze was convicted of ordering the murder and sentenced to death in 1994; his execution by shooting on 12 July 1995 was the final execution carried out in Lithuania before capital punishment was abolished. Following Dekanidze's execution, the syndicate disintegrated into smaller, competing factions.

== History ==
=== Origins and rise (1987–1991) ===
The Vilnius Brigade emerged around 1987 during the Perestroika era of the Soviet Union. As early cooperative businesses and semi-private commercial ventures began to appear, black-market operators and criminals organized protection rackets to extort money from new entrepreneurs. Unlike many regional gangs across the former Soviet Union that were ethnically homogenous, the Vilnius Brigade was multi-ethnic, consisting of Lithuanians, ethnic Russians, Polish Lithuanians, and Soviet Jews.

The intellectual architect of the gang was Georgijus Dekanidzė (known as "Zhora" or "Gruzin"), a criminal veteran who reportedly maintained ties to international criminal circles in Western Europe and the United States. Operational leadership was assumed by his son, Boris Dekanidze, alongside lieutenants such as Igoris Tiomkinas ("Timokha"). In the late Soviet period, the group specialized in extortion, the fencing of stolen luxury consumer goods, car theft, and cross-border contraband smuggling through Poland and East Germany.

=== Expansion and peak (1991–1993) ===
Following the restoration of Lithuanian independence and the collapse of the USSR in 1991, organized crime exploded across the country. Due to porous borders, legal gray zones, and under-resourced law enforcement agencies, criminal organizations dominated local commerce. In 1993, Lithuania recorded 1,194 homicides, including 480 intentional murders, a substantial increase over pre-independence figures. While Kaunas was dominated by the Daktarai syndicate led by Henrikas Daktaras and Klaipėda by the Gaidjurgis gang, the Vilnius Brigade became the unchallenged master of the illicit underworld in Vilnius.

The Brigade established front organizations, including the "Association of Production and Commercial Firms" (Lithuanian: Gamybos ir komercijos firmų asociacija), and systematically targeted the post-Soviet voucher privatization market between 1990 and 1993. By intimidating competing bidders, rigging state property auctions, and laundering illicit proceeds, the gang acquired prime hotels, restaurants, and commercial real estate in central Vilnius and established control over the expansive Gariūnai Market. The syndicate also operated extensive illicit networks in auto theft (often demanding ransoms from car owners for the return of vehicles), debt collection, weapons trafficking, and narcotics distribution.

The Brigade's resources and connections enabled it to exercise broad political and economic leverage. In the early post-independence months, when state security organs faced acute weapons shortages, the group reportedly supplied firearms directly to the Ministry of the Interior of Lithuania. In 1992, in an interview published in the national daily newspaper Respublika, gang representatives claimed that "Vilnius belongs to the Brigade" and that no enterprise in the city could function without paying them protection tribute.

During this era, the Brigade engaged in violent conflicts with urban competitors, most notably the "Greens" (Žalieji), led by Anatolijus Tomilinas ("Žalias"). On 9 September 1992, a public shootout took place between the Brigade and Tomilinas's associates, leaving several wounded and cementing the Brigade's dominance in the capital. Contemporary press reports frequently attributed various unexplained killings to the Brigade, though several violent contract murders were subsequently discovered to have been the work of Valerijus Janiuškevičius's independent gang of hitmen, who operated in parallel.

== Assassination of Vitas Lingys ==
=== Murder and investigation ===
In 1993, Vitas Lingys, an investigative reporter and deputy editor-in-chief of Respublika, began publishing articles exposing the inner workings of the Vilnius Brigade, their control over commercial enterprises, and their connections to corrupt politicians and police officials. Lingys faced repeated anonymous telephone calls warning him to stop his investigations or face death.

On the morning of 12 October 1993, Lingys was shot three times in the head as he left his apartment building in Vilnius to take his dog for a walk; he died shortly afterward in the hospital. The murder shocked the country and was seen by President Algirdas Brazauskas and the Seimas as an existential challenge by organized crime against the Lithuanian state. A state security task force was established, leading to rapid arrests:

- Boris Dekanidze – Leader of the Brigade; charged with ordering the hit while staying in Jūrmala, Latvia.
- Igoris Achremovas ("Achrem") – Syndicate enforcer who carried out the shooting.
- Viačeslavas Slavickis ("Slavėnia") – Accomplice and getaway driver.
- Borisas Bobičenka ("Slon") – Accomplice who provided logistics.

=== Trial and Ignalina nuclear threat ===
During the 1994 trial before the Supreme Court of Lithuania, Achremov confessed to his role and testified against Dekanidze, stating that Dekanidze had ordered the assassination to intimidate journalists and compel the authorities to halt investigations into the Brigade's business holdings.

On 10 November 1994, Dekanidze was convicted of organizing the premeditated murder of Lingys and leading a criminal syndicate; he was sentenced to death by shooting. Achremov was sentenced to death as well, but his sentence was commuted to life imprisonment due to his cooperation with investigators. Slavickis and Bobičenka received prison sentences of 14 and 13 years, respectively.

Following the pronouncement of Dekanidze's death sentence, Lithuanian security services received warnings of potential retaliatory terrorist attacks. In mid-November 1994, a bomb threat was made against the Ignalina Nuclear Power Plant, demanding Dekanidze's release under threat of detonating explosives inside the reactor halls. Supported by intelligence assessments from Germany, the Lithuanian government took the unprecedented step of shutting down both of the plant's nuclear reactors, at an estimated cost of $10 million, while Swedish explosive-detection teams and Lithuanian security forces swept the facility.

=== Execution of Boris Dekanidze ===
Following the rejection of his clemency appeal by President Brazauskas, Dekanidze was executed by a single gunshot to the head on the morning of 12 July 1995 at Lukiškės Prison in Vilnius. Unlike other death row inmates in Lithuania during that era—who were transported in a modified van and executed in forests outside the city—Dekanidze was shot inside the prison under extreme security precautions to prevent rescue attempts.

Dekanidze was the last person to be executed in Lithuania. In 1996, the country instituted a moratorium on capital punishment, and in December 1998, the Seimas permanently removed the death penalty from the criminal code. Dekanidze was buried in the Jewish Cemetery of Vilnius alongside his father.

== Disintegration and aftermath ==
The execution of Boris Dekanidze and the imprisonment of key enforcers broke the command structure of the Vilnius Brigade, causing it to collapse and splinter into smaller, autonomous street gangs. Residual factions fought over the remaining assets and extortion territories, while law enforcement continued to round up mid-level operatives throughout the late 1990s.

The fates of former leadership figures diverged significantly:

- Georgijus Dekanidzė retreated from public life following his son's execution and died of natural causes in Vilnius in 2010.
- Igoris Tiomkinas ("Timokha"), Dekanidze's chief deputy, fled Lithuania following the 1993 arrests and took refuge in Germany. He was detained and extradited to Lithuania in 1995, where he received a 10-year prison sentence for participating in an organized criminal association. Released early in 2004, he entered the sports management field, working with football club FK Polonija Vilnius. On the night of 6 July 2014, Tiomkinas was shot four times in the back and killed in the courtyard of his residential complex in Vilnius by an unidentified assailant.
- David Kaplan ("Dodik"), an early Brigade associate and former co-owner of Bankas Snoras, relocated to Moscow following the gang's demise. He became a prominent Russian real estate and infrastructure investor, working closely with the billionaire Magomedov brothers in the Summa Group.
- Igoris Achremovas, the gunman who shot Lingys, had his life sentence reduced to 25 years in 2004 and was granted conditional parole in April 2012 after serving 18.5 years in prison.

== Notable members ==
- Boris Dekanidze (1962–1995) – Leader of the Brigade; ordered the contract killing of Vitas Lingys. Sentenced to death in 1994 and executed by shooting in 1995.
- Georgijus Dekanidzė ("Zhora", "Gruzin"; 1937–2010) – Father of Boris Dekanidze and ideological mentor of the organization; died in Vilnius in 2010.
- Igoris Tiomkinas ("Timokha"; 1960–2014) – Second-in-command; coordinated protection rackets and contraband. Imprisoned from 1995 to 2004; shot dead in Vilnius in July 2014.
- Igoris Achremovas ("Achrem") – Syndicate hitman; carried out the fatal shooting of Vitas Lingys. Released on parole in 2012.
- Zbignevas Mackevičius ("Kot") – Head of the Brigade's specialized car theft division; survived multiple assassination attempts by rivals and former partners before being committed to psychiatric care in 2009.
- Aleksandras Ždanovas ("Ždanas") – Brigade enforcer; arrested in Riga in 1998 and sentenced to 12 years' imprisonment for murder.
- Romas Karpavičius ("Karpis") – Brigade enforcer; shot security guards at the "Delfinas" bathhouse in Vilnius in 1995 and fled to Russia; extradited in 2007, sentenced to 13 years, and released in 2016.
- Tadeušas Vasilevskis ("Gibonas") – Gang enforcer; later convicted of illicit cocaine distribution.
- David Kaplan ("Dodik") – Financial associate and early co-owner of Bankas Snoras; relocated to Russia.
- Eugenijus Svirnialis ("Geniukas"; 1963–1998) – Former operative involved in fatal internal disputes following the syndicate's collapse; died of an overdose or poisoning in 1998.

== See also ==
- Capital punishment in Lithuania
- Lukiškės Prison
