= Mačiulis =

Mačiulis is the masculine form of a Lithuanian family name. Its feminine forms are: Mačiulienė (married woman or widow) and Mačiulytė (unmarried woman).

The surname may refer to:

- Jonas Mačiulis, Lithuanian professional basketball player
- Maironis, Lithuanian poet, birth name Jonas Mačiulis
- Teklė Mačiulienė, chief editor of Kauno diena newspaper (1987–1998), recipient of medal Už nuopelnus žurnalistikai ("For Merits in Journalism")
