= Magdeburg rights =

Set of town privileges

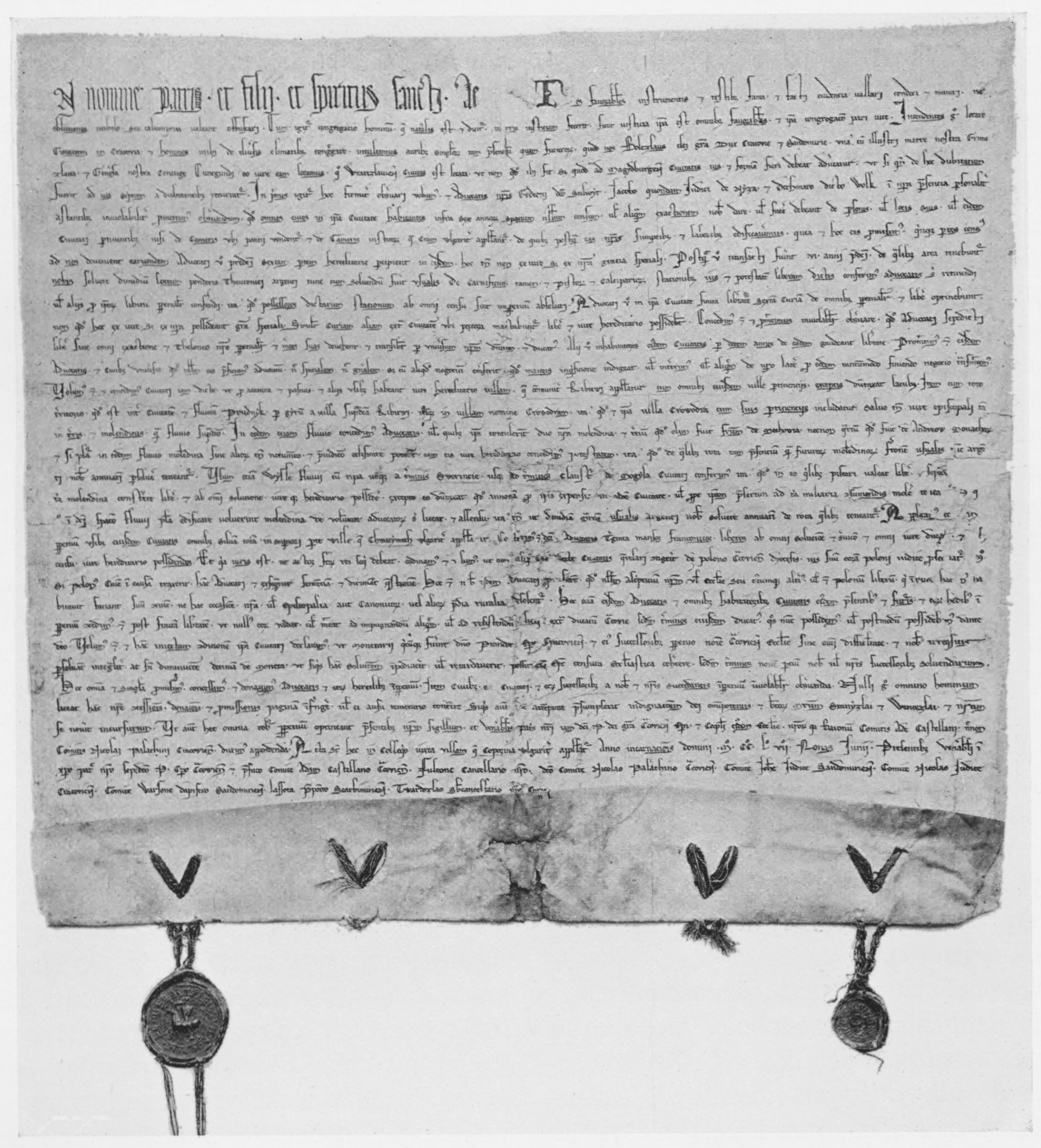
City charter of Kraków, Poland's medieval capital; inscribed in Latin.

Magdeburg rights (German: Magdeburger Recht, Polish: Prawo magdeburskie, Lithuanian: Magdeburgo teisė; Ruthenian: Право майдеборскоє, Майдебурскіе права; also called Magdeburg law) were a set of town privileges first developed by Otto I, Holy Roman Emperor (936–973), which regulated the degree of internal autonomy within cities and villages granted by the local ruler. Named after the city of Magdeburg and based on Roman municipal and universal merchant traditions, these town charters were perhaps the most important set of medieval laws in Central Europe. They became the basis for the German town laws developed during many centuries in the Holy Roman Empire. The Magdeburg rights were adopted and adapted by numerous monarchs, including the rulers of Bohemia, Hungary, Poland, Galicia-Volhynia and Lithuania, a milestone in the urbanization of the region which prompted the development of thousands of villages and cities.

== Provisions ==
=== Role in intercommunal relations ===
Being a member of the Hanseatic League, Magdeburg was one of the most important trade cities, maintaining commerce with the Low Countries, the Baltic states, and the interior (for example, Braunschweig). As with most medieval city laws, the rights were primarily aimed at regulating trade to the benefit of the local merchants and artisans, who formed the elite of such cities. Non-resident merchants coming into the city were not allowed to trade on their own, but were instead forced to sell the goods they had imported to local traders, if any wished to buy them.

Jews and Germans were sometimes competitors in those cities. Jews lived under privileges that they carefully negotiated with the king or emperor. Importantly, they were not subject to city jurisdiction. These privileges guaranteed that they could maintain communal autonomy, live according to their own laws, and be subjected directly to the royal jurisdiction in matters concerning Jews and Christians. One of the provisions granted to Jews was that a Jew could not be compelled to be a Gewährsmann/informant; that is, he had the right to keep confidential how he had acquired objects in his possession. A Jew with this right could voluntarily divulge who had gifted, sold, or loaned him the object, but it was illegal to coerce him to say. Other municipal liberties enjoyed by Jews were permission to sell meat to Christians or employ Christian servants. By at least some contemporary observers, the parallel infrastructure of Jews and gentiles was considered significant; in medieval Poland's royal city development policy, both German merchants and Jews were invited to settle in Polish cities.

=== System of government ===
On the early stages, broad powers in cities ruled according to Magdeburg Law belonged to the figure of vogt/wójt, who was appointed by the ruler. With time, that position was increasingly acquired by the city communes, who turned it into an elected post. The emerging collegiate organ of power, consisting of the vogt and several councillors (also known as consul or rajca), was known as the magistrate and functioned as a city council. The magistrate shared its judicial powers with the court organ (ława/lava), which could also be elected and usually specialized in criminal prosecutions. The unlimited power of the magistrates in some cities led to the growth of urban oligarchy, as a result of which royal authorities would sometimes introduce special organs representing common burghers. Some cities had separate legal jurisdictions for different ethnic groups.

== Spread of the law ==
Modern major city	Year
Leipzig	1165
Wrocław	1242
Szczecin	1243
Poznań	1253
Kraków	1257
Lublin	1317
Bydgoszcz	1346
Lviv	1356
Vilnius	1387
Brest	1390
Kaunas	1408
Łódź	1423
Kyiv	1494
Grodno	1496
Minsk	1499
Mogilev	1577
Vitebsk	1597
Smolensk	1611
Vinnytsia	1640
Homel	1670

Among the most advanced systems of old Germanic law of the time, in the 13th and 14th centuries, Magdeburg rights were granted to more than a hundred cities, in Central Europe apart from Germany, including Schleswig, Bohemia, Poland, Pomerania, Prussia, the Grand Duchy of Lithuania (following the Christianization of Lithuania), including present-day Belarus and Ukraine, and probably Moldavia. In these lands they were mostly known as German or Teutonic law. Since the local tribunal of Magdeburg also became the superior court for these towns, Magdeburg, together with Lübeck, practically defined the law of northern Germany, Poland and Lithuania for centuries, being the heart of the most important "family" of city laws. This role remained until the old Germanic laws were successively replaced with Roman law under the influence of the Reichskammergericht, in the centuries after its establishment during the Imperial Reform of 1495.

== Implementation across Europe ==
Act of granting of Magdeburg rights to Kobylin in Poland by King Władysław II Jagiełło

The first town to be granted Magdeburg rights in Poland was Złotoryja in 1211. Soon many towns were vested with the law including Wrocław, Opole, Inowrocław, Sandomierz, Gniezno, Poznań, Bochnia, Głogów, Bytom, Sieradz, Kraków, Legnica, Opatów, Konin, Piotrków, Racibórz in the 13th century, whereas Szczecin and Stargard were granted the rights in 1243 by the duke of Pomerania.

The Law of Magdeburg implemented in Poland was different from its original German form. It was combined with a set of civil and criminal laws, and adjusted to include the urban planning popular across Western Europe – which was based (more or less) on the ancient Roman model. Meanwhile, country people often ignorant of the actual German text, practiced the old common law of Poland in private relations. Local variants of Magdeburg law were created, such as Środa law based on the rights granted to Środa Śląska by Henry the Bearded in 1235, Kalisz law, a variant of the Środa law, based on the rights granted to Kalisz by Bolesław the Pious before 1268, and Poznań law, a variant of Magdeburg rights, based on the rights granted to Poznań by Bolesław the Pious in 1253.

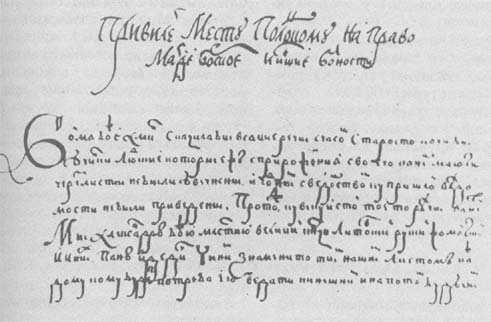
A privilege granting Magdeburg Rights to Polotsk

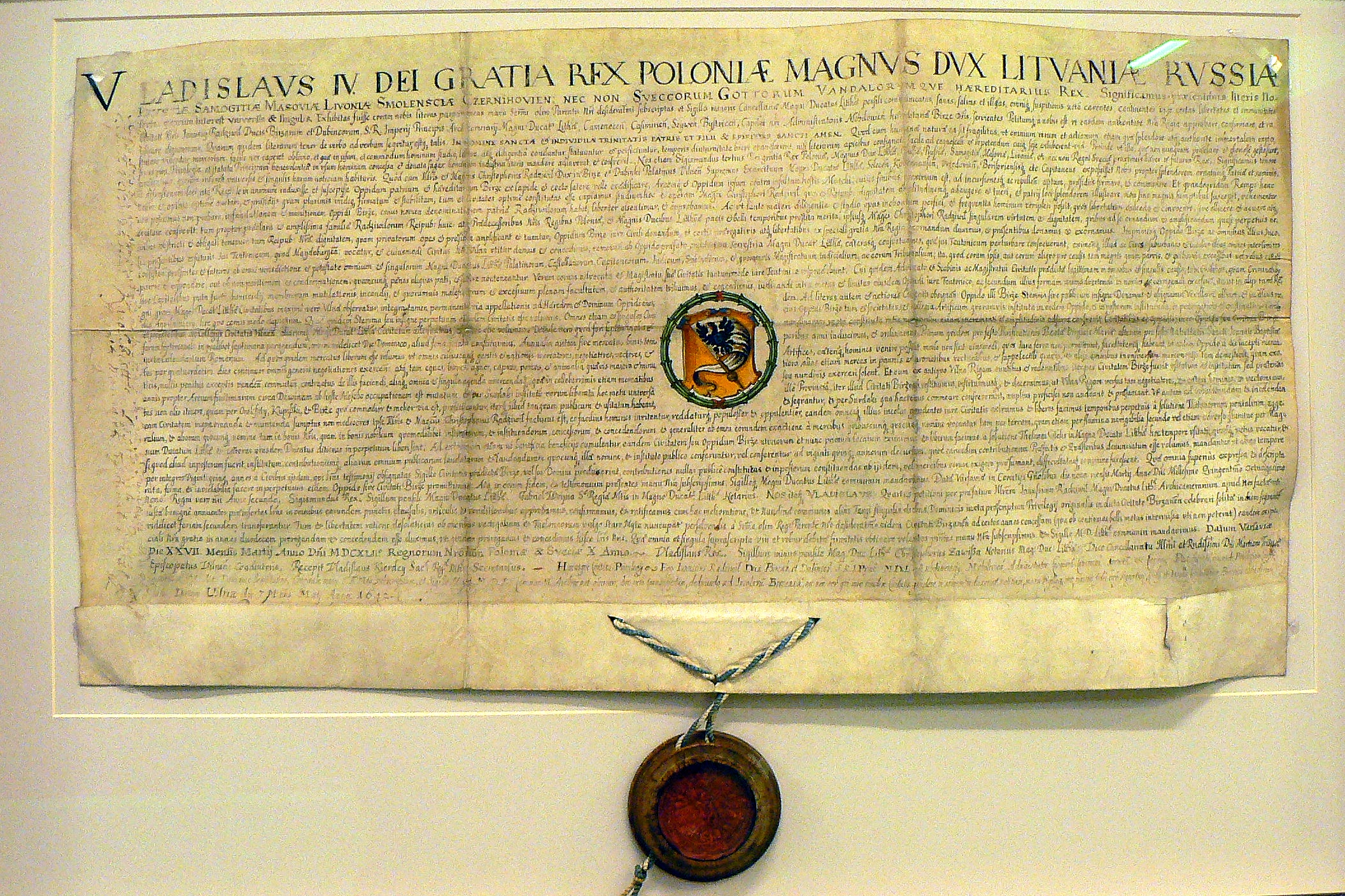
Confirmation of Magdeburg rights for Biržai by King Władysław IV Vasa

In Galicia-Volhynia the first city known to have adopted Magdeburg rights was Volodymyr in Volhynia. Initially, the law only concerned ethnic German population, but in 1339 Sanok became the first town whose entire population was granted Magdeburg rights by king Yuri II Boleslav.

Following the formation of the Polish–Lithuanian union in 1385, Magdeburg rights spread to Lithuania, first granted to the chief cities of Vilnius, Brest and Kaunas, although more slowly than earlier in Poland, especially late in the east and in private towns. In the 15th and 16th centuries, the rights were granted to many other towns, including, chronologically, Trakai, Grodno, Kyiv, Polotsk, Minsk, Novogrudok, Rechytsa, Slonim, Barysaw, Mogilev, Mazyr, Mir, Pińsk, Alytus, Nyasvizh, Šiauliai, Biržai, Lida, Kėdainiai and Vitebsk. Magdeburg rights in Lithuania were initially modeled after the Polish cities of Kraków and Lublin, and then after Vilnius.

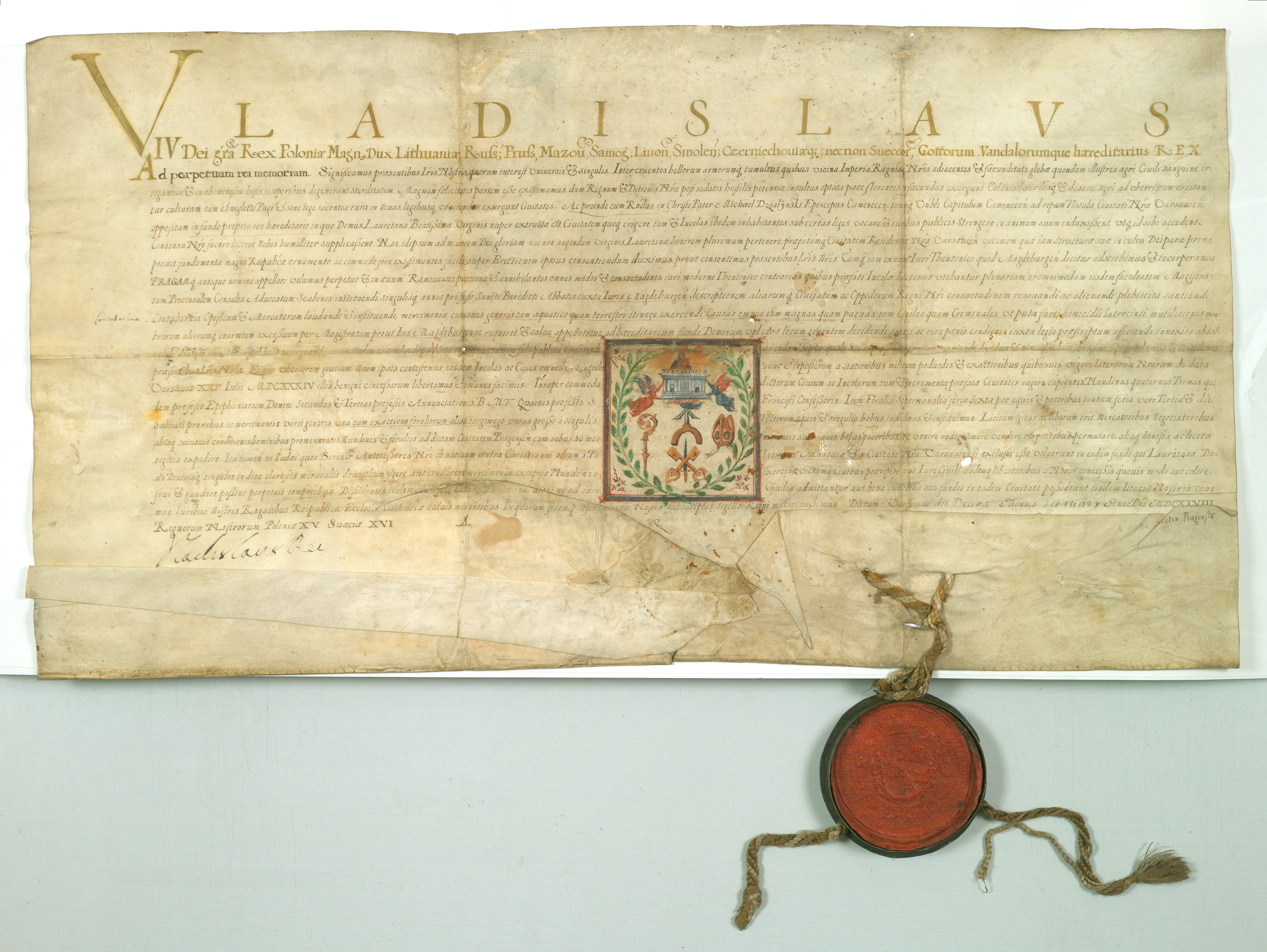
Act of granting of Magdeburg rights to Praga in Poland by King Władysław IV Vasa

Hundreds of towns in Poland and Lithuania, some now located in Belarus, Latvia and Ukraine, were formerly governed on the basis of the location privilege known as the "settlement with German law", excluding local variants of Magdeburg rights, with some of the more notable cities being, chronologically, Lublin, Zielona Góra, Tarnów, Olkusz, Sanok, Bydgoszcz, Rzeszów, Lwów, Będzin, Kielce, Krosno, Wieliczka, Częstochowa, Jarosław, Przemyśl, Chełm, Kazimierz Dolny, Łódź, Kamieniec Podolski, Łuck, Żytomierz, Rivne, Kowel, Siedlce, Leszno, Tarnopol, Rydzyna, Augustów, Płoskirów, Zamość, Daugavpils, Brody, Orsza, Biała Cerkiew, Nowogród Siewierski, Czernihów, Nizhyn, Krzemieńczuk, Vinnytsia, Poltava, Stanisławów, Jēkabpils, Suwałki, Białystok, Uman, Palanga, Telšiai, Cherkasy and Marijampolė.

The rights reached the easternmost cities of the Polish–Lithuanian Commonwealth, including Roslavl, Smolensk and Starodub, now part of Russia. The advantages of the Magdeburg rights were not only economic, but also political. Members of noble families were able to join the city patriciate usually unchallenged. There were cases of changing the type of municipal rights, such as in Błonie from Magdeburg to Chełmno rights, and in Bielsk Podlaski and Tykocin from Chełmno to Magdeburg rights.

Most towns ruled by the Teutonic Order and Duchy of Masovia, as well as some cities under direct Polish and Lithuanian rule, obtained Chełmno rights, a local variant of Magdeburg rights, which prevailed in the area roughly corresponding to today's northeastern quarter of Poland, including the current Polish capital of Warsaw. In addition to this, many towns in the Duchy of Pomerania in modern north-western Poland and other Baltic port cities were granted Lübeck law, thus the original Magdeburg law was relatively rare in what is now northern Poland.

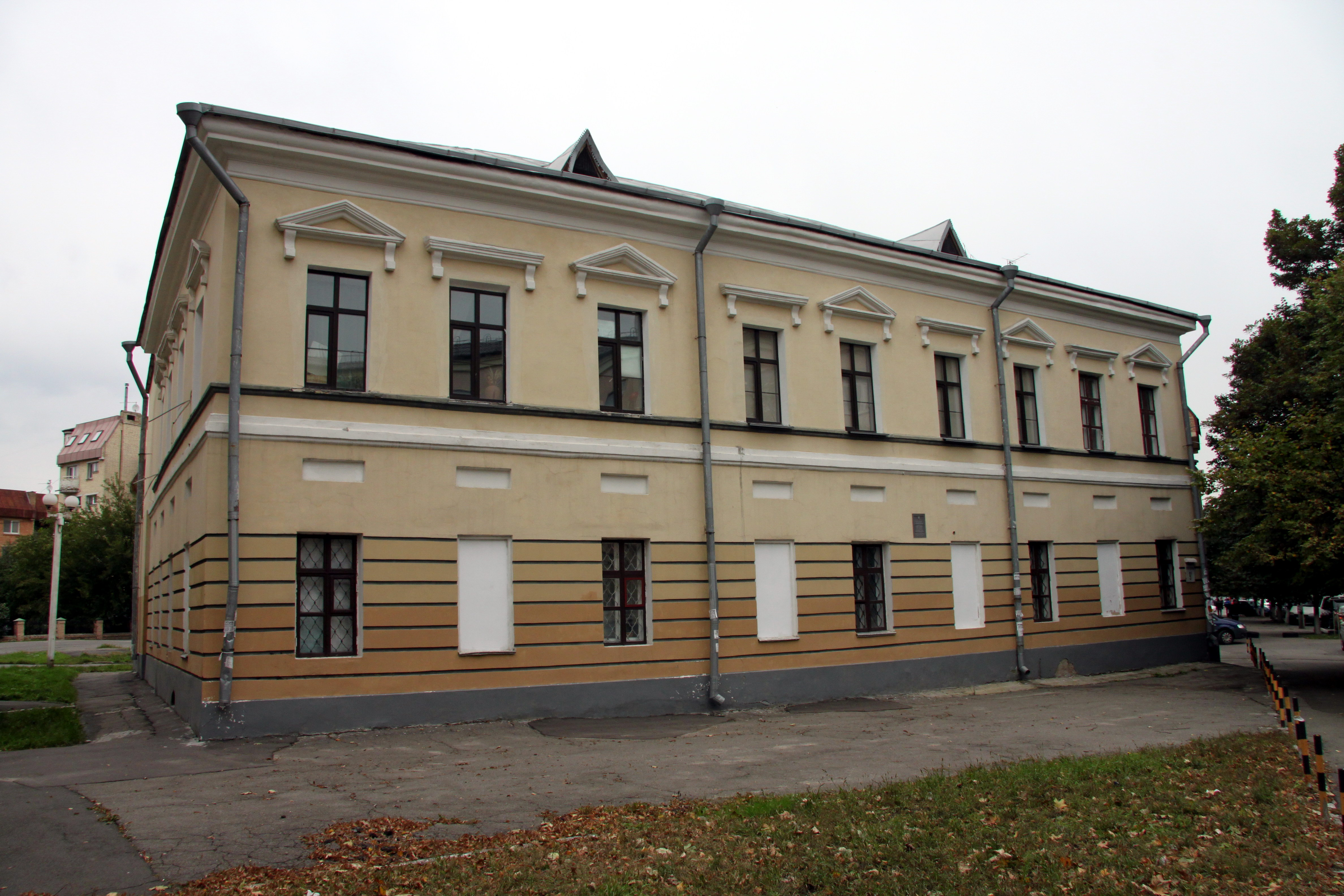
House of Hryhoriy Kyselivskyi, the last viyt (wójt) and burgomaster of Kyiv

In the medieval Kingdom of Hungary, the first town to receive the Magdeburg rights was Székesfehérvár in 1237, followed by Trnava (1238), Nitra (1248), Levoča (1271) and Žilina (1369). Towns and cities including Bardejov, Buda, Bratislava and Košice adopted the Southern German Nuremberg town rights, rather than the Magdeburg rights.

Following the 1654 Treaty of Pereyaslav, numerous cities in the Cossack Hetmanate, which had received Magdeburg Law during the Polish-Lithuanian era, had their rights and privileges confirmed, and several additional cities were granted Magdeburg rights by the tsars and hetmans. In most cities of modern-day Ukraine Magdeburg Law was implemented only partially, with vogts or starosts being appointed separately from council members (burgomasters); in the Cossack Hetmanate regimental courts and administration actively intervened in the affairs of cities. With time, norms of the Magdeburg Law in Ukrainian lands were increasingly replaced with the Statutes of Lithuania. Magdeburg Law in the Russian Empire was abolished according to a tsar's decree in 1831, except of Kyiv, which lost its Magdeburg rights in 1835.

In Galicia Magdeburg Law was abolished by Joseph II in 1786. In 1832, the city of Chernivtsi was granted Magdeburg rights by the Austrian authorities.

== Heritage ==
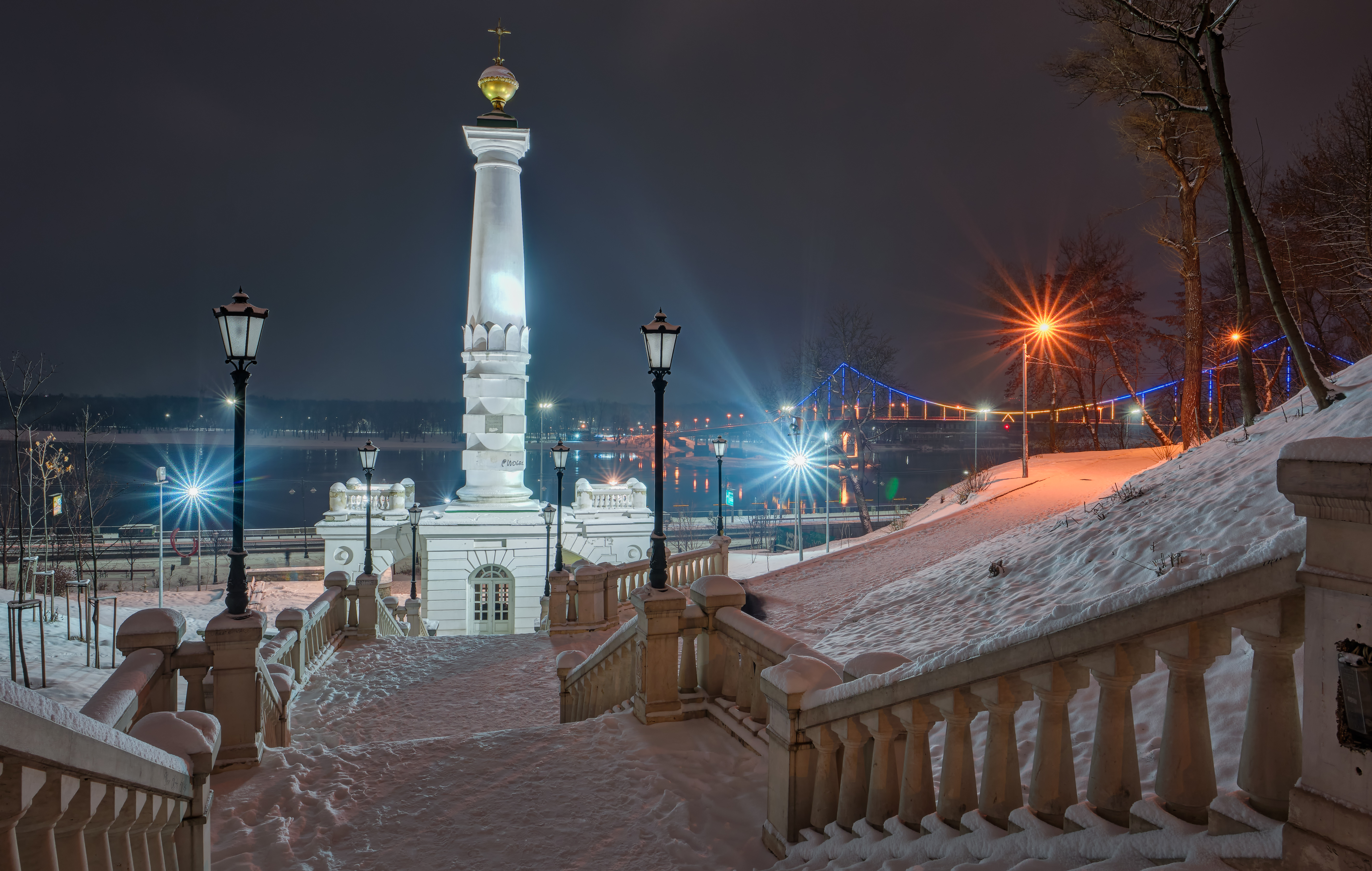
Monument to the Magdeburg Rights in Kyiv

The old towns of Kraków, Lviv, Vilnius and Zamość, considerably developed under the Magdeburg rights, are World Heritage Sites, and Kazimierz Dolny, Lublin, Paczków, Poznań, Przemyśl, Rydzyna, Sandomierz, Stary Sącz, Tykocin and Wrocław are also designated Historic Monuments of Poland.

There are memorials to the Magdeburg rights in Kyiv, Minsk, Tetiiv, Veiviržėnai and Vinnytsia.

== See also ==
- Danzig law
- German town law
- Kulm law
- Lübeck law

== Bibliography ==
- Bardach, Juliusz (1980). "Miasta na prawie magdeburskim w Wielkim Księstwie Litewskim od schyłku XIV do połowy XVII stulecia". Kwartalnik Historyczny (in Polish). Vol. 87, no. 1.
- Rewieńska, Wanda (1938). Miasta i miasteczka magdeburskie w woj. wileńskim i nowogródzkim (in Polish). Lida.
