= Daktarai =

- Lithuanian: Daktarai
- Founded: 1978
- Founder: Henrikas Daktaras
- Named after: Henrikas Daktaras
- Founding location: Kaunas, Lithuanian SSR, Soviet Union
- Years active: 1978–2000s
- Territory: Lithuania, Western Europe
- Ethnicity: Lithuanians
- Membership: ~60
- Leader: Henrikas Daktaras
- Activities: Racketeering, smuggling, car theft, extortion, contract killing, armed robbery, fraud
- Allies: Latvian and Russian organized crime groups
- Rivals: Rival Lithuanian organized crime groups (e.g. Vilnius Brigade, Daškiniai)
- Notable members: Egidijus Abarius Rimantas Ganusauskas Deividas Ganusauskas Vidmantas Gudzinskas Romas Zamolskis Algirdas Žemaitis

The Daktarai (Lithuanian: Daktarai, lit. 'Doctors') was an organized crime syndicate in Lithuania, active from the late 1970s until the late 2000s. The group was led by crime boss Henrikas Daktaras (nicknamed "Henytė"). It is widely considered by law enforcement to have been one of the most dangerous and influential criminal syndicates in modern Lithuanian history. The gang's headquarters was the "Vilija" restaurant, which opened in 1992 in the Kaunas neighborhood of Vilijampolė. Following the collapse of the gang, the premises were repurposed into a grocery store before the building was demolished in 2018.

Members of the group were implicated in various violent and serious felonies, including contract killings, attempted murders, extortion, robberies, and grand theft auto. In total, approximately 200 criminal episodes were documented in the group's consolidated criminal indictment, including more than 30 murders (primarily assassinations of competitors or internal defectors), coercing law enforcement officers into complicity in contraband trafficking, and destroying criminal case files. The syndicate was heavily armed with military-grade automatic weapons, handguns, shotguns, and explosives stolen from army depots or purchased through illegal channels. According to Lithuanian police, the group forged alliances with Latvian and Russian organized crime syndicates and was protected by corrupt high-ranking law enforcement officials (Russian: крыша, romanized: krysha, lit. 'roof'). In 2009, even the Speaker of the Seimas, Arūnas Valinskas, faced an ethics scandal and pressure to step down after allegations surfaced regarding his connections with figures linked to the gang.

== Formation ==
Henrikas Daktaras's organization first surfaced in 1978 in Kaunas, primarily engaging in car thefts, extortion, and robberies. The syndicate's power grew rapidly starting in 1986 during Perestroika. At its height, the gang numbered roughly 60 core members. Prominent members included:

- Vidmantas Gudzinskas, alias "Guzas" (Lithuanian: Guzas, lit. 'Bump')
- Egidijus Abarius, alias "Goga"
- Deividas Ganusauskas, alias "Mongoliukas" (Lithuanian: Mongoliukas, lit. 'Little Mongol')
- Rimantas Ganusauskas, alias "Mongolas" (Lithuanian: Mongolas, lit. 'Mongol')
- Rolandas Zaveckas, alias "Džempis" (Lithuanian: Džempis, lit. 'Sweater')
- Ramūnas Stanionis, alias "Morda" (Russian: Морда, romanized: Morda, lit. 'Mug/Snout')
- Alvydas Laurinavičius, alias "Liaupas"
- Rimvydas Žilinskas, alias "Taisonas" (Lithuanian: Taisonas, lit. 'Tyson')
- Romas Zamolskis, alias "Zamas"
- Vaidas Vancevičius
- Algirdas Žemaitis, alias "Kukas"
- Vladimiras Seneckis, alias "Turistas" (Lithuanian: Turistas, lit. 'Tourist')

== Criminal activities ==
In 1991, the Daktarai began levying protection money on private businesses across Kaunas and brought almost the entire criminal underworld of the city under their sway, from Vilijampolė (Daktaras's home district) to Žaliakalnis and Šančiai. Over time, their operations spread across Lithuania and expanded into Western Europe, with gang cells active in Germany, France, and Belgium. In their early phase, the gang concentrated on car theft, demanding ransoms from owners to return their stolen vehicles. Abroad, the gang attempted to establish legitimate commercial facades in the Belgian cities of Herstal and Liège funded by stolen car sales and trafficking; however, as Belgian authorities launched criminal proceedings, gang members dispersed to Wijnegem, Turnhout, and Antwerp. Daktaras is believed to have set up workshops in Charleroi and Namur designed for repainting and altering stolen cars.

According to police intelligence, the Daktarai orchestrated rigged auctions during Lithuania's early post-Soviet privatization process, forcing competitors out and acquiring state assets cheaply. In the early years of Lithuanian independence, Daktaras also established control over the illegal liquor and pure spirit trade. When Kaunas police once confiscated a large shipment of smuggled spirits, gang operatives raided the warehouse and managed to retrieve a portion of it. Soon afterward, direct appeals were made to President Algirdas Brazauskas on behalf of Banka Baltija founder Eduards Ginburgs and the company Lavent B.V. seeking the release of the remaining confiscated shipment. It is believed that alongside Daktaras, Sigitas Čiapas—president of the Agora concern, which imported alcoholic drinks—was involved in the affair.

The gang was also implicated in racketeering against Kaunas vice-mayor Steponas Vaičikauskas and former Chairman of the Bank of Lithuania Robertas Preikša, as well as the fraudulent embezzlement of assets from the insurance company Ūkio draudimas. The gang assassinated a series of competitors, rivals, and former associates; victims included Vladimiras Seneckis, Robertas Borchertas, former member Rimantas Ganusauskas, and Arvydas Mučinskas, among others. Following the execution by firing squad of Boris Dekanidze, boss of the Vilnius Brigade, on 12 July 1995 for ordering the murder of journalist Vitas Lingys, the Daktarai remained the only dominant, large-scale organized crime group left standing in Lithuania.

On 7 October 1993, masked gunmen burst into the "Vilija" restaurant and opened fire with Kalashnikov assault rifles at Daktaras's inner circle in an attempt to assassinate Daktaras himself, detonating a hand grenade. Five members of the syndicate—Romualdas Varanavičius, Remigijus Vizgirda, Andrius Janulevičius, Petras Bulvydas, and Vytautas Kazakevičius—were killed on site. Daktaras miraculously escaped harm, having stepped into an adjoining room moments before the shooters entered. Two years later, 28-year-old criminal boss Rimantas Zalagaitis, whose gang specialized in smuggling stolen luxury vehicles, was arrested in Chicago; Daktaras openly accused Zalagaitis of orchestrating the hit and offered a $100,000 bounty for his death. Another theory alleged that the attack had been organized by Daktaras's former associate, Rimantas Ganusauskas. Ganusauskas later vanished without a trace, a disappearance widely attributed to retaliation orchestrated by Daktaras. On 21 March 1994, 31-year-old businessman Gintaras Pliuščiauskas—whose firm "P&P Ost-West Handels GmbH" smuggled metals and alcohol—was assassinated in Hamburg; his widow, Jorinda Pliuščiauskienė, blamed Sigitas Čiapas for the murder over an unpaid 11 million Deutsche Mark debt, though Čiapas denied any involvement and offered a $100,000 reward for information about the killers.

On 3 February 1996, Daktaras was arrested in Kaunas, and on 1 April he was formally indicted for extortion and witness tampering. He was reportedly turned in by an associate known as "Guzas". On 5 April 1996, at around 8:00 AM in the Sargėnai neighborhood of Kaunas, two hitmen from Daktaras's gang pulled up in a Volkswagen Golf near the home of 32-year-old entrepreneur Sigitas Čiapas, who was preparing to leave for Vilnius in a BMW alongside his wife Jolanta Čiapienė and his bodyguard-driver Vincas Varnas. As Čiapas closed his gate, the gunmen opened fire with AKM rifles: Varnas sustained fatal wounds and died on the operating table later that afternoon, while Čiapas was killed instantly after being struck by dozens of rounds, followed by two point-blank execution shots to the head. Čiapienė threw herself out of the vehicle and survived. According to prosecutors, Čiapas was assassinated by Daktaras's organization because he had agreed to testify against Daktaras and was urging fellow businessmen to do the same. In February 1997, Daktaras was convicted of racketeering and sentenced to 6.5 years in prison, but was released early in 2001 for good behavior.

== Downfall ==
The arrests and trials of Daktaras severely weakened the gang's leadership, and by the early 2000s, most of its prominent figures had either been killed or incarcerated. Soon afterward, Interpol secured the capture of several rank-and-file members abroad who were extradited back to Lithuania and confessed to participating in multiple gangland crimes. Investigations were significantly aided by the cooperation and confessions of key underworld figures such as Laurinavičius, Žilinskas, Gudzinskas, and others. High-ranking members including Abarius, Ganusauskas, Zaveckas, and Stanionis were subsequently put on trial. Several fugitives were tracked down in Spain, where Daktaras owned real estate and had once planned to settle. Daktaras was subsequently returned to prison, and following a renewed criminal probe involving Latvian businessman Mārtiņš Putniņš, he fled Lithuania in late 2008 and was placed on the international wanted list.

On 4 September 2009, Daktaras was arrested in Kranevo, Bulgaria, having been located after his associate Vitalijus Latūnas was identified by authorities. On 6 October 2009, he was extradited to Lithuania and remanded in pre-trial detention on 2 June 2010. Daktaras and 14 accomplices were indicted on more than 20 major offenses, including six murders, racketeering, and illegal possession of firearms. Daktaras pled not guilty to all charges. On 17 June 2013, the Klaipėda Regional Court found him guilty of eight major crimes (including two murders) and sentenced him to life imprisonment.

== Fate of other gang members ==
- Egidijus Abarius ("Goga") – Sentenced to 20 years' imprisonment on 17 June 2013.
- Romas Zamolskis ("Zamas") – Fled to Russia in 2002, where he continued a violent criminal career involving armed robberies and contract killings. In 2014, he attempted to renounce his Lithuanian citizenship to avoid extradition. He was apprehended in Yekaterinburg by Russian police and later sentenced to 16 years in prison for crimes committed in the Russian Federation.
- Algirdas Žemaitis ("Kukas") – Fatally shot in March 2009 during an argument by Valdemaras "Labanas" Labanauskas; Labanauskas was subsequently acquitted by the court on the grounds of lawful self-defense.
- Rimantas Ganusauskas ("Mongolas") – Disappeared without a trace on 25 December 1993, and was declared legally dead in 1999. According to one version, he was murdered on 25 December 1993 by Daktaras and Abarius after being forced to dig his own grave in a forest. According to another account, the killing was carried out by Zamolskis.
- Deividas Ganusauskas ("Mongoliukas") – Brother of Rimantas Ganusauskas; convicted in 1997. He later testified as a witness for the state during the trial against Henrikas Daktaras.
- Vidmantas Gudzinskas ("Guzas") – Convicted.
- Rolandas Zaveckas ("Džempis") – Convicted.
- Ramūnas Stanionis ("Morda") – Convicted.
- Alvydas Laurinavičius ("Liaupas") – Arrested.
- Vaidas Vancevičius – Arrested. During interrogation, he testified that he refused to pay dues into the common gang fund (Russian: общак, romanized: obshchak).
- Rimvydas Žilinskas ("Taisonas") – Arrested.

== Bibliography ==
Peliukhovsky, Eduard; Vodo, Vladimir (1996-04-08). "Ответный удар" [Counterstrike]. Бизнес & Балтия (in Russian). Vol. 69, no. 442.
