= Senbernarė Bitė =

St. Bernard dog (2004–2016)

Bitė (31 May 2004 – 31 May 2016) was a female St. Bernard dog in Kaunas, Lithuania. She was known locally for navigating the city on her own, including crossing streets, riding public transport, and running errands for her owner. According to her owner, she also rescued several animals and a child in her lifetime.

After Bitė's death, a bronze sculpture of her was installed in the Žaliakalnis district of Kaunas.

== Life ==
Bitė lived her entire life in the Žaliakalnis district of Kaunas with her owner, Algimantas Bakas. Bakas said that he initially gifted Bitė to his friend, who had wanted a Saint Bernard since childhood. However, after six months, she returned Bitė to Bakas, saying the dog was causing disruption at home. Bakas described Bitė as mischievous when young, but said she later became calmer and obedient.

Bitė was often seen at Žaliakalnio turgavietė, a local market in Kaunas, carrying a basket in her mouth with a shopping list and money, and returning home with the requested items. Bakas had trained Bitė to carry a shopping basket in her mouth as a way to show that she was harmless, after receiving complaints from members of the public and fines from the police for not muzzling her.

Bitė was reported to cross streets unaccompanied (including waiting for traffic lights to change) and to ride the trolleybus. Bakas said she was also able to perform other domestic chores, such as taking out the rubbish and bringing in firewood.

Bakas credited Bitė with rescuing several animals throughout her life, including fourteen cats, and said that on several occasions, her maternal instinct triggered lactation, and she nursed the kittens until they recovered. He also said that she saved a chick from being run over after it fell from a crate in a car reversing into the Aleksotas market, and rescued a child from drowning in an open reservoir left behind by the Soviet army.

To mark Bitė’s tenth birthday, Kaunas residents gathered in Laisvės alėja in Kaunas. A local hairdresser groomed Bitė for the occasion, and a bakery made a four-kilogram B-shaped cake.

== Death ==
Bitė died on 31 May 2016, from heart disease. Her death was reported by Lithuanian media, with some outlets calling her a symbol of Kaunas.

== Legacy ==
=== Statue of Bitė ===
In 2018, a bronze, life-size sculpture of Bitė was erected in the Žaliakalnis district of Kaunas, near the Žaliakalnis market on Zanavykų Street. The location was chosen because that's where Bitė was often seen during her life.

The work was created by sculptor Lukas Šiupšinskas. The project originated as a proposal by Bakas and was delivered through the urban art initiative 'Kauno akcentai' ("Kaunas Accents"). According to Lithuanian press coverage at the time of the unveiling, it was the third public monument to a St. Bernard in the world and the first to a female of the breed.

The sculpture has subsequently been included in Lithuanian travel listings of notable animal monuments in the country.

=== Memoir of Bitė ===
Following Bitė's death, Bakas started working on a memoir about his life with his pet. The Lithuanian newspaper Kauno diena reported that the project was both a personal account and a tribute to those who had known Bitė.
