= Jonaitis =

Jonaitis is a surname. Notable people with the surname include:

- Aldona Jonaitis (fl. 1975), American anthropologist
- Kazys Jonaitis (born 1943), Lithuanian serial killer
- Ly Jonaitis (born 1985), Venezuelan actress
