= Valentinas Laskys =

Lithuanian serial killer

- Born: 1953; Kaunas, Lithuanian SSR, Soviet Union
- Died: 12 December 1993 (aged 40); Lukiškės Prison, Lithuania
- Status: Executed by shooting
- Conviction: Murder with aggravating circumstances (3 counts)
- Penalty: Death

Details
- Victims: 3 (proven), 4 (presumed)
- Span of crimes: 1990–1992
- Country: Lithuania and Belarus

Valentinas Laskys (1953 – 12 December 1993) was a Lithuanian serial killer who, together with his daughter, robbed and killed three or four people. He was executed by shooting for these crimes.

== Early life ==
During his infancy, Laskys was taken away from his mother due to neglect. He grew up in a care home, and was transferred from primary school to a specialized care home.

== Murders ==
Throughout his criminal career, Laskys was convicted seven times before being sentenced to death. In 1991, after committing a murder in Minsk, he went into hiding in Russia, Georgia and Moldova where he was arrested in Chișinău.

== Trial and execution ==
On 5 August 1993, Laskys was found guilty of committing at least three murders since 1990. The court sentenced him to death.

Laskys was executed by shooting at Lukiškės Prison on 12 December 1993. Vladimiras Ivanovas was also executed on the same day for killing a mother and her 4-year-old daughter.

== See also ==
- List of serial killers by country
- Capital punishment in Lithuania
