= Antanas Varnelis =

Lithuanian serial killer

- Born: 1971; Dadotkai, Telšiai District, Lithuanian SSR, Soviet Union
- Died: 28 September 1994 (aged 22–23); Lukiškės Prison, Vilnius, Lithuania
- Cause of death: Execution by shooting
- Status: Executed
- Convictions: Murder with aggravating circumstances (6 counts); Attempted murder (3 counts); Robbery
- Penalty: Death

Details
- Victims: 6
- Span of crimes: July – December 1992
- Country: Lithuania
- States: Šiauliai, Kaunas, Marijampolė, Tauragė
- Date apprehended: 21 December 1992

Antanas Varnelis (1971 – 28 September 1994) was a Lithuanian serial killer who killed six people and attempted to kill three more between July and December 1992, in several municipalities around the country (Kelmė, Šiauliai, Raseiniai, Šakiai and Jurbarkas). He targeted lonely elderly people living in remote villages and robbed their houses to pay for his alcohol addiction. He was later executed for these crimes, the fifth of seven people executed before the capital punishment was abolished in Lithuania.

== Early life ==
Varnelis was born on 1 January 1971, in the village of Dadotkai in the Telšiai District, in a family with six more children (three boys and three girls). The family was dysfunctional: both parents were alcoholics and all of their children, including young Antanas, were sent to various homes. Varnelis ended up in an orphanage in Viešvilė. There, he established himself as reserved and unsociable, often running away and wandering around the neighbourhood. He was prone to theft and asocial behaviour, for which, at the age of 11, he was transferred to a specialized boarding school for difficult teenagers in the town of Gelgaudiškis. Varnelis abused alcohol, smoked cigarettes, and picked on those weaker than him, but was respectful to those stronger than him. He continued to steal and run away and showed no academic inclinations. After leaving the school, the state provided Varnelis with a workplace and dormitory room. At the same time, he tried to study at an agricultural school in Kudirkos Naumiestis, but soon abandoned it.

In August 1987, at the age of 16, Varnelis was first convicted of stealing 12 beer bottles and a chicken from a grocery store. He underwent an examination in a psychiatric hospital in Žiegždriai, where he was diagnosed with mild intellectual disability with pronounced psychopathic tendencies but was judged competent to stand trial. He was sentenced to 2 years and 3 months in an educational colony, but the sentence was postponed. Just a few months later, he robbed a passer-by stealing his wallet and was sentenced to 4 years imprisonment in Pravieniškės. He was released on 14 January 1992.

== Murders ==
Locations of Varnelis' crimes

After his release, Varnelis cohabited with an acquaintance from the orphanage, but soon quarrelled with him and left for his older brother Pranas, who worked on a private farm in Gelgaudiškis. There, Varnelis, according to eyewitnesses, was parasitic, living on his brother's expenses and abusing alcohol. The farm owners quickly got tired of Varnelis' behaviour, and both he and his brother were kicked out. While in Gelgaudiškis, in June 1992, under the threat of a knife, Varnelis attempted to rape a 13-year-old local resident, also stealing a loaf of bread and 300 rubles from her.

After this, he did not have a more permanent place and wandered around various villages. In July, together with his brother Pranas, Antanas robbed a house of a forester in Samuolynė in the Šakiai District. Pranas was apprehended while Antanas escaped. On 28 July, he committed his first murder in Bernotai in the Šakiai District. The victim was a lonely 70-year-old local, whom Varnelis beat to death. He then stole 2,000 rubles and set the house on fire to cover his tracks. The police arrested six suspects, but they had an alibi. Varnelis travelled on foot avoiding larger settlements and sleeping in random barns. Three weeks later, on 18 August, Varnelis committed the second murder in Feliksavas in the Telšiai District. The victim was another lonely pensioner. Varnelis stole 12,000 rubles and ate while the man was still alive. The investigators initially did not make a connection between the two murders. They did receive a description of Varnelis and were able to prepare a facial composite from two men to whom Varnelis sold the stolen items.

At the end of August 1992, Varnelis arrived in the town of Šimkaičiai in the Jurbarkas District, where he met a friend from the orphanage and got a job working with him on a farm. There, he was known to the locals as the young guy who often visited discos and met many girls. On the night of 31 October, Varnelis attacked once again, breaking into the house of an 86-year-old. He hit him with an axe on the head several times and then robbed the house. The victim died a week later in hospital without regaining consciousness. Varnelis was almost caught red-handed at the site: while he was still in the house cooking eggs, a relative of the victim arrived to check up on the old man. Varnelis managed to convince him that he was helping the old man with housework. While the relative was checking with a neighbour, Varnelis escaped to the forest and hid to watch the commotion.

On 14 November, near the village of Pakražantis in the Kelmė District, Varnelis killed for the 4th time – another lonely pensioner, from whom he stole a bicycle, a raincoat, a coffee grinder, hair spray, several bottles of homemade wine and groceries. The body of the 68-year-old woman, who was hit a total of nine times with an axe, was found a week later covered by straws. Varnelis lived in the victim's house for at least a day after the murder. The police arrested five suspects, but they provided an alibi and were released. Between 20 and 21 November, near Raudėnai in the Šiauliai District, Varnelis broke into an empty house but did not find anything of value. He then separately attacked two villagers with an axe – a 48-year-old man who was robbed of his motorbike and a 69-year-old woman who was robbed of 6,000 talonas. Both survived the attacks.

On 5 December, in the village of Keryvai in the Raseiniai District, Varnelis killed two women, a 92-year-old woman and her 68-year-old daughter-in-law. He remained in the house overnight drinking champagne, and on leaving, he stole several bottles of alcohol, two pairs of watches, two gold wedding rings, groceries and 15,000 talonas. The daughter-in-law was found still alive, but she died later in hospital. Four days after the murder, Varnelis' photo was shown on TV and published by newspapers asking the public for information. The Ministry of the Interior formed a task force to catch the perpetrator. The police searched for Varnelis in Gelgaudiškis.

== Arrest and trial ==
Upon learning that he was wanted, Varnelis changed his tactics. Now he only moved at night and slept in abandoned houses or barns during the day. He headed towards Vilnius from where he planned to escape. On the evening of 21 December 1992, in the village of Muniškiai in the Kaunas District, Varnelis was identified by locals based on his tattoos.

Varnelis immediately confessed to the murders and robberies, but not to the attempted rape. He underwent a forensic psychiatric examination in Utena which concluded that he was competent to stand trial. At the trial, Varnelis' defence focused on his disability, difficult childhood, and the fact that he confessed and cooperated with the police. His attorney asked for a second psychiatric examination, but Varnelis refused. In his final statement, Varnelis asked the court that, taking into account all the mentioned circumstances, he be sentenced to life imprisonment.

However, on 1 February 1994, the Criminal Chamber of the Supreme Court of Lithuania, chaired by Vytautas Greičius, found the 23-year-old Varnelis guilty of all charges and sentenced him to be executed by shooting. His clemency petition was rejected by the President of Lithuania Algirdas Brazauskas on September 16, and Varnelis was executed on 28 September 1994, in Vilnius. He was buried in the Karveliškės Cemetery in the section for those unclaimed by relatives.

== See also ==
- List of serial killers by country
