= Respublika (Lithuanian newspaper) =

Lithuanian newspaper

- Respublika print edition on April 16, 2021
- Type: Daily newspaper
- Publisher: Respublika Publications Group
- Editor-in-chief: Vitas Tomkus
- Founded: 1989
- Political alignment: Conservatism, euroskepticism, nationalism, antiglobalism
- Language: Lithuanian, Russian
- Headquarters: Vilnius, Lithuania
- Circulation: 55 000 (2005)
- Sister newspapers: Vakaro Žinios, Žalgiris
- Website: www.respublika.lt

Respublika (lit. 'Republic') is a right-wing Lithuanian newspaper, published since September 16, 1989. Since January 7, 1991, it has published a Russian language edition (Республика).

In 1993 one of the founders, deputy editor-in-chief, and investigative journalist Vitas Lingys was shot to death in Vilnius after several death threats. Lingys wrote about organized crime and published several revealing stories about "Vilnius Brigade" crimes. Boris Dekanidze, the head of the Vilnius Brigade in Lithuania, was found guilty of this crime and sentenced to death. He became the last person to be executed in July 1995 before the death sentence was abolished.

According to the TNS Gallup data, Respublika publication group used to be dominating in the country's press market. Newspaper by Respublika publication group (dailies Respublika (Lithuanian and Russian), Vakaro žinios, Šiaulių kraštas and Vakarų ekspresas) were read in average by 79.2% of all newspaper readers in early 2008. It became a weekly newspaper, rather than daily one starting from 2014. According to the Lithuanian digital journalist and a former advisor to the Prime Minister of Lithuania, Skirmantas Malinauskas who worked in the newspaper for a short time in the past, Respublika.lt falls out of the top 15 of the most readable Lithuanian portals as of 2022.

Circulation of the Lithuanian edition of Respublika reached 38,000 copies on Mondays–Thursdays and 55,000 copies on Fridays–Saturdays in 2005. In March 2007 26-year-old Ramunė Vaičiulytė became Respublika's first female editor-in-chief.

== Content ==
In 2006, the paper published a story that called former Israeli general and Soviet partisan Yitzhak Arad a "war criminal" for his alleged role in the Koniuchy massacre which was perpetrated by anti-Nazi Soviet partisans. As a result, the Lithuanian state prosecutor initiated an investigation of Arad. However, following an international outcry, the investigation was dropped in the fall of 2008.

The newspaper republished few fake news about the COVID vaccines during the COVID-19 pandemic, such as a claim that vaccines killed more Israelis than the Covid virus would have killed without vaccines, quoting an institute named after Robert F. Kennedy Jr. From 2021 and 2022 the newspaper was a vocal supporter of the Great Family Defence March, a nationalist euroskeptic movement fighting against the ratification of Istanbul Convention, LGBT rights and vaccine passports.

The newspaper further gained notoriety when it kept criticizing Lithuanian foreign policy of supporting Ukraine after the 2022 Russian invasion of Ukraine. The newspaper took a sympathetic stance towards the Russian government. As a result, two biggest retail chains in Lithuania (Rimi Baltic and Iki) and the Lithuanian Post stopped distributing the newspaper Respublika and its filial tabloid Vakaro žinios.
