= Vilniaus diena =

Vilniaus Diena
- Type: Daily newspaper
- Format: compact
- Owner: Hermis Capital
- Publisher: Diena Media News
- Founded: 2007
- Language: Lithuanian
- Circulation: 10,000 weekdays, 16,000 Saturdays
- Sister newspapers: Kauno diena
- Website: Vilniaus diena

Vilniaus diena (English: Vilnius Daily) is the Lithuanian language newspaper printed in Lithuania’s capital city Vilnius and attributed for the city.

== History and profile ==
Vilniaus diena was owned by the Norwegian media group Orkla until 2006 when the paper was sold to Hermis Capital. It is published by Diena Media News. The newspaper's circulation exceeds 10,000 on business days and over 16,000 on Saturdays.
