= Capital punishment in Lithuania =

Lithuania's former capital sentence

Europe holds the greatest concentration of abolitionist states (blue). Map current as of 2022 Abolished for all offences Abolished in practice Retains capital punishment

Capital punishment in Lithuania was ruled unconstitutional and abolished for all crimes on 9 December 1998. Lithuania is a member of the Council of Europe and has signed and ratified Protocol 13 of the European Convention on Human Rights on complete abolition of death penalty. From March 1990 to December 1998, Lithuania executed seven people, all men. The last execution in the country occurred in July 1995, when Lithuanian mafia boss Boris Dekanidze was executed.

== Capital punishment in 1918–1940 ==
=== Legal basis and execution methods ===
When Lithuania declared independence in February 1918, it adopted the criminal code based on the Russian Criminal Code of 1903 but with substantial amendments. The code provided for the death penalty only for crimes against the state (for example, conspiring to intervene with the imperial succession), but military law of war provided for death penalty by shooting or hanging for some 30 different crimes including banditry, robbery, rape, and premeditated murder. When Lithuania updated its statutes in January and February 1919, the duality remained: the death penalty was abolished in the criminal code but was retained in the military law (Lithuanian: Ypatingi valstybės apsaugos įstatai). Article 14 of the military law provided for death penalty for eight crimes, mostly directed against the state, the military, or the officials, but also included armed robbery with murder. The provisional constitution of 1920 even spoke about the abolition of the death penalty. However, Lithuania with brief interruptions remained under the martial law until November 1938 when it was lifted due to German pressure in the months before the ultimatum of March 1939.

Historian Sigita Černevičiūtė counted at least 146 executions in interwar Lithuania, though records are incomplete and fragmentary. Due to the martial law, the executions were carried out by the military by shooting though legal acts provided hanging. In 1937–1940, Lithuania operated a gas chamber in Aleksotas within the First Fort of the Kaunas Fortress. In January 1937, the criminal code was amended to provide execution by gas which at the time was viewed as more civilized and humane. Lithuania considered and rejected execution by poison. The first execution was carried on July 27, 1937: Bronius Pogužinskas, age 37, convicted of the murder of five members of a Jewish family. Černevičiūtė counted at least nine executions in the gas chamber. Of the nine, eight were convicted of murder. One, Aleksandras Maurušaitis, was in addition convicted of anti-government actions during the 1935 Suvalkija farmers' strike. The last known execution took place on May 19, 1940, for robbery. The fate of the gas chamber after the occupation by the Soviet Union in June 1940 is unclear.

=== Noted political executions ===
During the chaotic years of the Lithuanian Wars of Independence, not all executions were properly carried out. For example, in 1919, communist activists Feliksas Valiukas and his wife were executed without a trial and Jurgis Smolskis was executed (allegedly during an escape attempt) even though he received only a six-year prison sentence.

In February 1920, four men were executed for instigating a mutiny among soldiers stationed in Kaunas. Between the coup in December 1926 and Soviet occupation in June 1940, Lithuania was ruled by authoritarian President Antanas Smetona and there were several political executions. Four communists were executed in the immediate aftermath of the December 1926 coup while sentences of two others were commuted to life imprisonment. Eight people were executed for their participation in the anti-Smetona revolt in Tauragė in September 1927 while 14 other were pardoned. General Konstantinas Kleščinskis was convicted of spying for the Soviet Union and executed in June 1927. Aleksandras Vosylius was executed in May 1929 for an assassination attempt on Prime Minister Augustinas Voldemaras. 18 people received death sentences for their participation in the 1935 Suvalkija farmers' strike, but the majority received presidential pardons and only five were executed. In other instances, the presidential pardon was used more generously. For example, three men, including General Petras Kubiliūnas, received pardons for their role in the 1934 anti-Smetona coup and five men received pardons for their conviction of murder during the Neumann–Sass case.

== Capital punishment in 1990–1998 ==
=== Legal developments and abolition ===
During the Soviet occupation, the criminal code provided for the death penalty in 16 articles. After the declaration of independence in March 1990, a new criminal code was adopted in December 1991, in which the death penalty was provided only in Article 105 for premeditated murder in aggravating circumstances. Lithuania became a signatory of the International Covenant on Civil and Political Rights in February 1992. The covenant, among other things, provided that each person had the right to petition for clemency. In July 1994, amendments to the criminal code specified that women or people younger than 18 at the time of the crime could not receive death sentences. The execution of the death penalty was suspended on July 25, 1996 by a decree of President Algirdas Brazauskas. The president refused to review clemency petitions without which no death penalty could be carried out.

Abolition of the death penalty was one of the requirements for Lithuania's accession to the European Union in its 2004 enlargement. However, opinion polls found that 70–80% of Lithuanians supported its retention. Thus, members of Seimas (the Lithuanian parliament) were reluctant to vote for its abolition. Instead, Seimas brought a case to the Constitutional Court of Lithuania to determine whether the death penalty was constitutional. On December 9, 1998, the Constitutional Court ruled that it was unconstitutional as it was contrary to Articles 18 (Human rights and freedoms shall be innate), 19 (The right to life of a human being shall be protected by law), and 21.3 (It shall be prohibited to torture or injure a human being, degrade his dignity, subject him to cruel treatment, or to establish such punishments) of the Constitution of Lithuania. On December 22, the criminal code was amended to strike out the death penalty effective December 31, 1998. Sentences for nine people on death row were commuted to life imprisonment.

In 2013, a violent murder of a woman reignited the debate on the capital punishment. Parliament Speaker Vydas Gedvilas publicly stated that the idea of reintroducing capital punishment merits consideration and members of the Order and Justice proposed a bill to reinstate it. A poll found that about half of the respondents would support capital punishment, and only 37 percent were against the death penalty.

In 2017, Remigijus Žemaitaitis proposed the restoration of the death penalty in Lithuania.

=== List of executions ===
Between 1990 and 1995, some 30 people received death sentences. From March 1990 to December 1998, Lithuania executed seven men by shooting with a single firearm:

1. August 8, 1992 – Aleksandras Novatkis (age 24) for murder of a 12-year-old witness to his theft
2. December 12, 1993 – Vladimiras Ivanovas (age 30) for murder of a mother and her 4-year-old daughter
3. December 12, 1993 – Valentinas Laskys (age 40) for murder of four people
4. January 27, 1994 – Vidmantas Žibaitis (age 29) for murder of three elderly people
5. September 28, 1994 – Antanas Varnelis (age 23) for six murders and three attempted murders in July–December 1992
6. May 18, 1995 – Aleksandras Gudkovas (age 39) for murder of two people
7. July 12, 1995 – Boris Dekanidze (age 33) for ordering the murder of journalist Vitas Lingys

== See also ==
- Criminal Code of Lithuania
