= Vakarų ekspresas =

Daily newspaper in Klaipėda, Lithuania

- Vakarų ekspresas print edition on April 15, 2021
- Type: Daily newspaper
- Format: Tabloid
- Owner(s): UAB "Vakarų ekspresas"
- Editor: Gintaras Tomkus
- Founded: 15 September 1990; 35 years ago
- Political alignment: Non-aligned
- Headquarters: Klaipėda, Lithuania
- Circulation: 9 000 (Print, 2014)
- ISSN: 2783-7939
- Website: ve.lt

Vakarų ekspresas (lit. 'Western express'), published in Klaipėda, Lithuania is the largest regional newspaper of Lithuania Minor and Samogitia. The circulation is approximately 10,000 copies, with a primary focus on events within Western Lithuania.

Vakarų ekspresas is published daily, except for Sundays. Its supplements include Eteris (TV guide), Autosalonas (automobiles), Sveikata (health), Litas prie lito (financial), Jūros vartai (regional news), Kultūros uostas (culture) and Šeštadienis (Saturday edition). The newspaper is distributed in Klaipėda, Gargždai, Skuodas, Mažeikiai, Palanga, Kretinga, Plungė, Telšiai and Vilnius.

== History ==
The origins of the newspaper date back to 7 July 1988, when a group of young journalists and technicians, who were employed by the then Communist Party-owned newspaper "Tarybinė Klaipėda" (lit. 'Soviet Klaipėda'), published an independent publication entitled "Persitvarkymo naujienos" (lit. 'News of Change') in the aftermath of the first meeting of the Sąjūdis activists. The initial circulation of the publication was 30 copies, and from the second issue onwards, it was renamed "Mažoji Lietuva" (lit. 'Lithuania Minor'). During this period, the editorial offices were situated in two cities, Klaipėda and Vilnius, reflecting the ambition to establish a publication that would embody qualities of youthfulness, liberalism and courage.

The newspaper's character was defined by its role as a national political weekly, and its circulation between 1989 and 1991 ranged from 30,000 to 50,000 copies. For a period of eighteen months, Mažoji Lietuva enjoyed the distinction of being the most widely read newspaper in Lithuania. After this period, the publication underwent a rebranding, resulting in the launch of Vakarų ekspresas on 15 September 1990. The primary objective of this transition was to offer an alternative to Tarybinė Klaipėda.

From January 1992, the publication was published three times a week, on Tuesdays, Thursdays and Saturdays. In 1993, the weekly edition of Mažoji Lietuva was discontinued and Vakarų ekspresas became a daily newspaper. In 1999, the newspaper's official website, www.ve.lt, was launched.

== Prominent journalists ==
- Ramunė Visockytė
- Vytautas Čepas
- Gintaras Vaičekauskas
