= Lukiškės Prison =

Defunct prison in Vilnius, Lithuania

Coordinates: 54°41′29″N 25°15′59″E

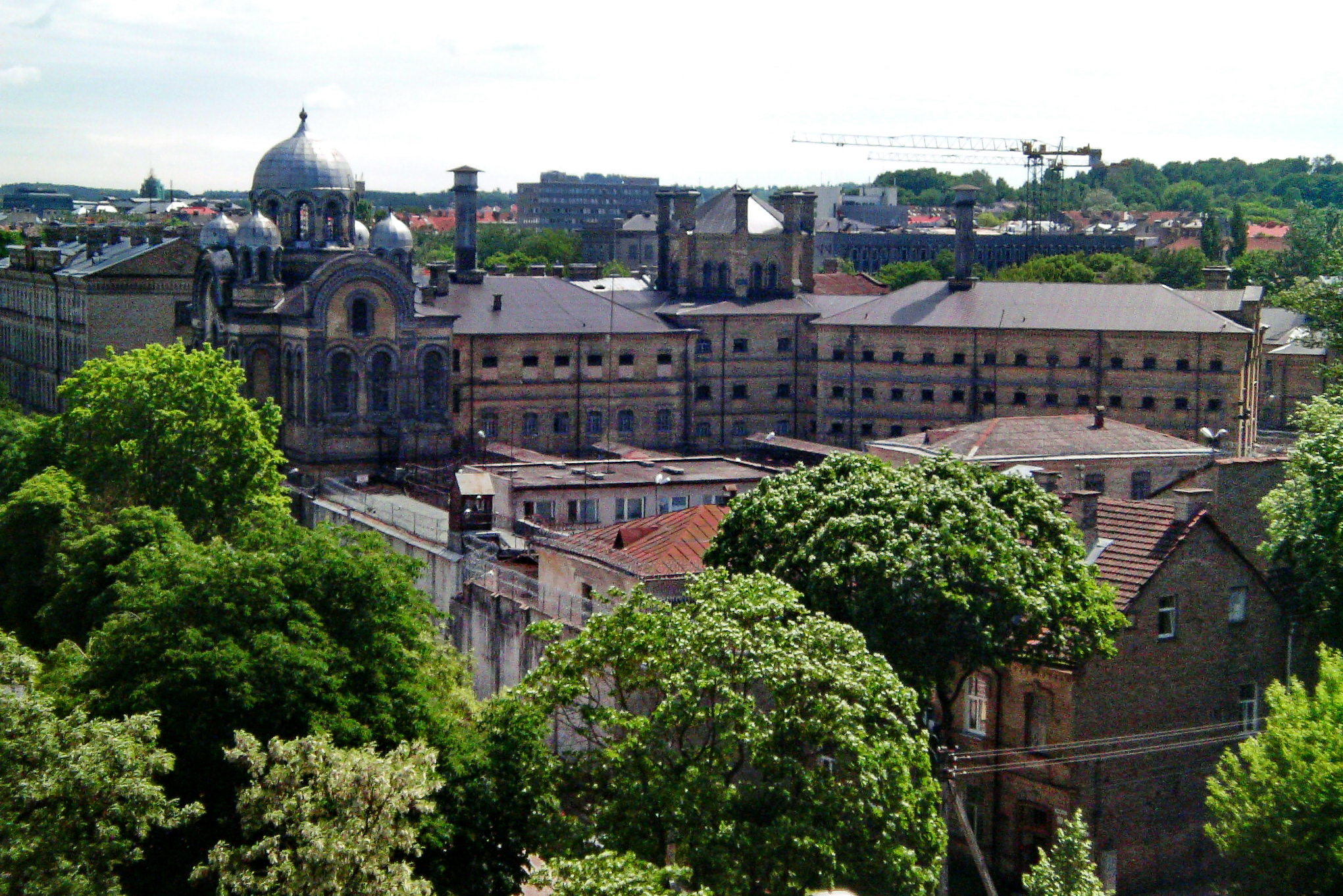
- Interactive map of Lukiškės Prison
- Location: Vilnius, Lithuania
- Status: Closed
- Security class: detention center
- Capacity: 1,000
- Opened: 1837
- Closed: 2019
- Website: lukiskiukalejimas.lt

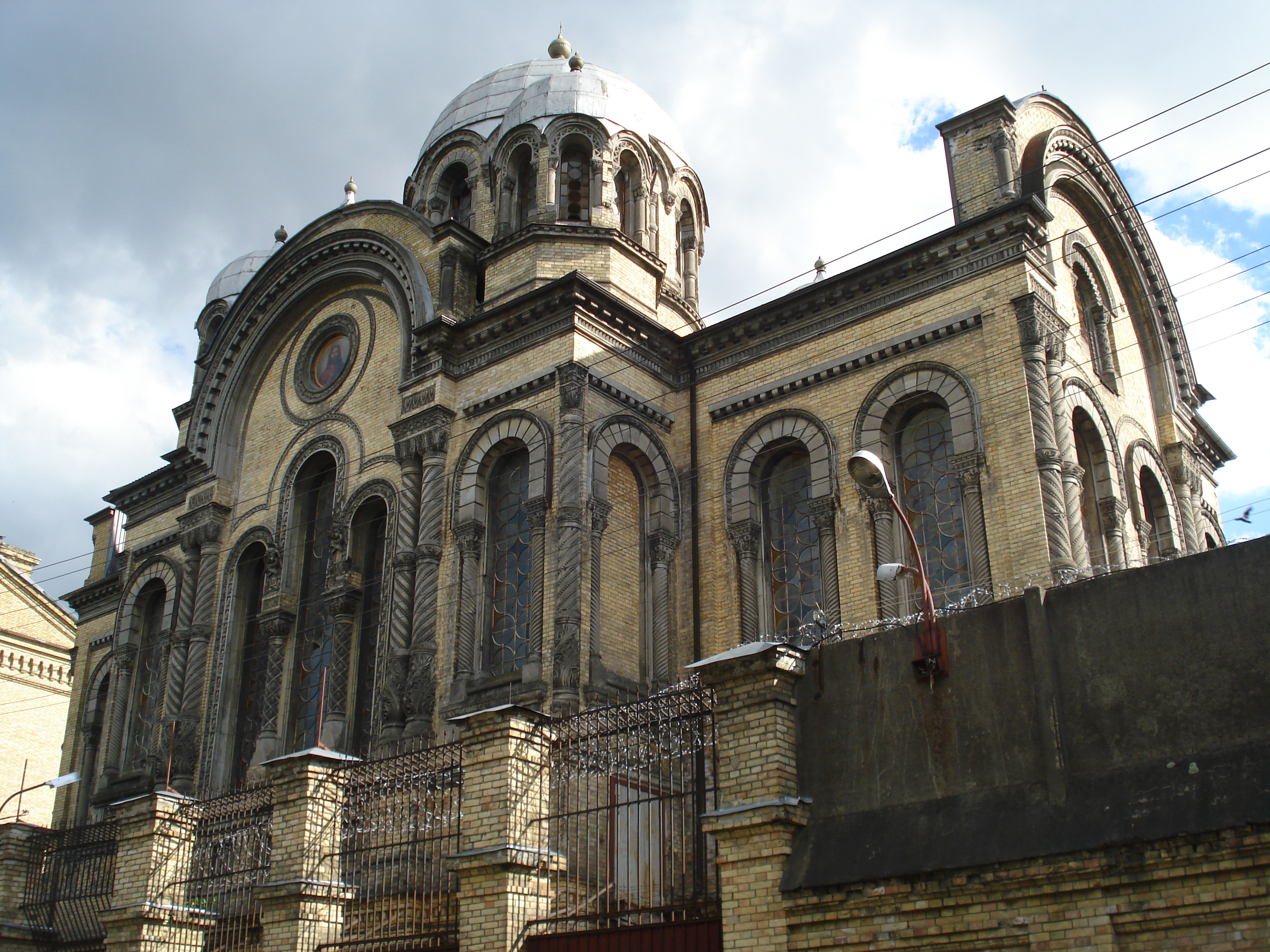
Saint Nicholas Orthodox Church, part of the Lukiškės Prison complex

Lukiškės Prison (Note: Native name: Lithuanian: Lukiškių tardymo izoliatorius kalėjimas. In other languages also known as: Polish: Więzienie na Łukiszkach or simply Łukiszki; Belarusian: Лукішкі) is a former prison in the center of Vilnius, Lithuania, near the Lukiškės Square and was operational from 1837 until 2019.

== Construction ==
=== Background ===
Until the late 19th century the main form of punishment in Russian-held part of partitioned Polish-Lithuanian Commonwealth was the katorga, or forced resettlement to a remote area to heavy labour camps or prison farms. This was true for both criminal and political prisoners alike. The Russian Penal Code of 1845 further strengthened the notion. Furthermore, prior to the Emancipation reform of 1861 the serfs, who constituted most of the society in contemporary Russian-held Europe, could be incarcerated by their master rather than in state-run prisons. Because of that, for most of the 19th century the small criminal prison at Vilnius' suburb of Lukiškės, converted from an earlier Roman Catholic monastery in 1837, was enough to suit the needs of the Russian authorities. Most prisoners spent only a short period in the prison before being either released, sent to the gallows or sent to distant regions of Russia for penal servitude.

However, the 1874 revision of the criminal code of Russia introduced two additional penalties: a short-term prison confinement (up to 1.5 years) and long-term prison confinement (up to 6 years). Meanwhile, the old prison became dilapidated and severely overcrowded. It was clear that a new prison complex was needed. Because of that in 1900 G.A. Trambitski, the official architect of the Main Prison Authority, was tasked with designing a modern, high-security prison complex. Instead of moving it out of the city, the tsarist authorities decided to demolish the old prison and build the new one in its place. One of the reasons for it was the site's proximity to the newly built Provincial Court building (today Museum of Occupations and Freedom Fights).

=== Design ===
The project was inspired by Jeremy Bentham's idea of Panopticon, and was based on the design of Kresty Prison in Saint Petersburg, which in turn was modelled after Moabit Prison in Berlin and the Holmesburg Prison and Eastern State Penitentiary in Philadelphia. In 1901 construction work began and the old prison was closed down and demolished. The works were supervised by General Anatoliy Kelchevskiy. The plot of land occupied by the old prison was too small to accommodate a modern prison. Because of that an adjoining plot of land previously occupied by a Lipka Tatar cemetery was bought for the price of 20 thousand roubles.

The new complex covered the entire block. It included a penal prison with cells for 421 inmates, a detention centre for 278 inmates, as well as several other buildings. Those included an office building, kitchen, bakery, baths, ice cellar and a laundry. In addition, there were family apartments for the warden, his four deputies and 37 officers, and 24 smaller flats for single officers. One of the most distinctive buildings in the complex was the Orthodox St. Nicholas Church, one of the finest Orthodox churches in Vilnius. However, as most of the inhabitants of the Vilna Governorate were Catholics or Jews, a separate Catholic church and a small synagogue were also built into one of the prison blocks. The new prison had its own water supply and had its own sewage system. The complex was surrounded with a stone wall.

The prison complex was the most expensive building constructed in the region in the early 20th century. The cells were fully equipped, heated and ventilated, and constructed entirely of non-combustible materials (except for window frames and doors). The prison block containing the churches alone cost 504,000 roubles. The building of the detention centre cost 285,000 roubles, while the administrative building with offices and apartments for the staff cost approximately 180 thousand roubles. Despite its complexity, the project was finished in 1905, a full year ahead of schedule.

=== Location ===
The prison is located in a prestigious area, next to the Seimas Palace and Martynas Mažvydas National Library of Lithuania.

== History of use ==
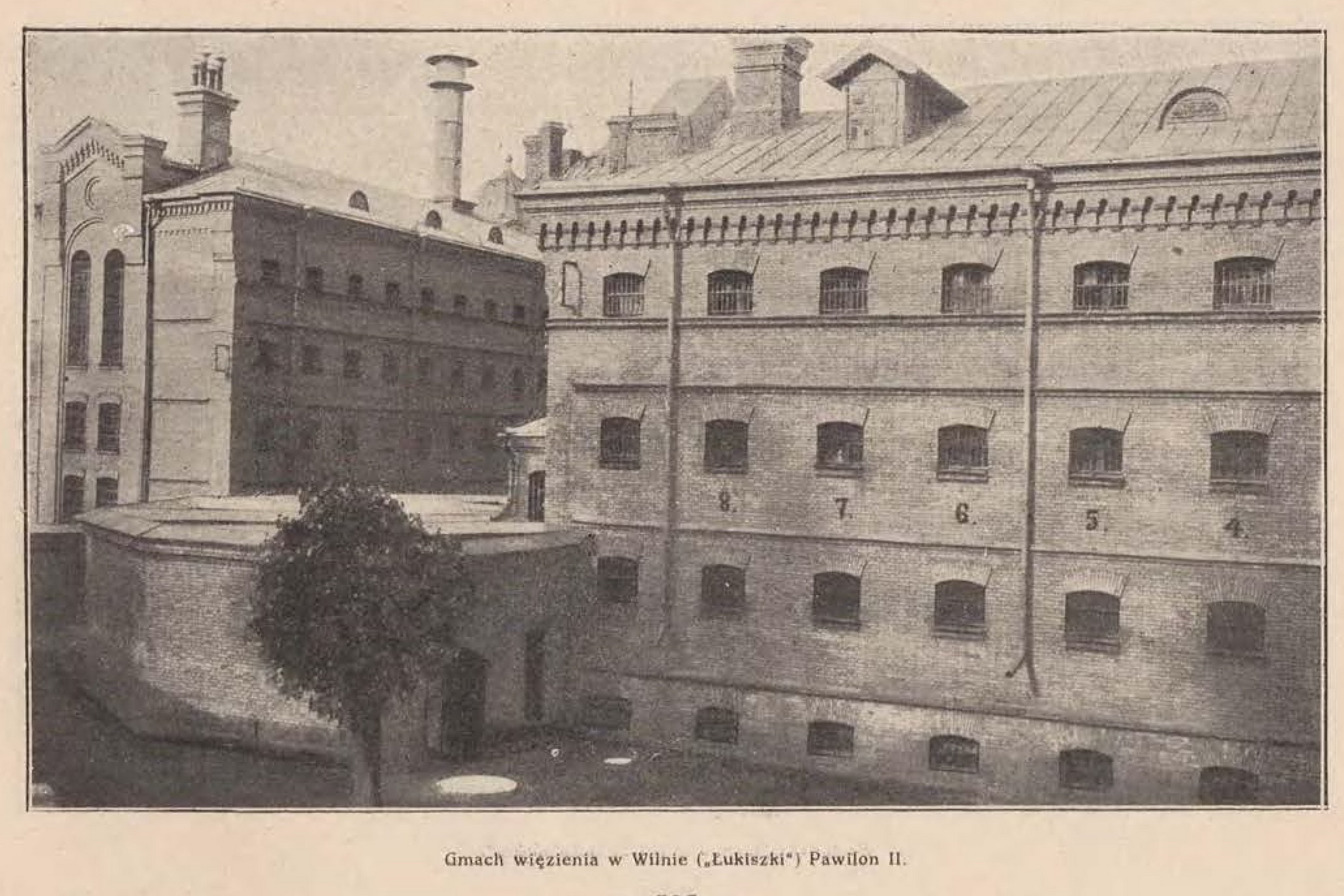
Prison during the interwar period

=== Second Polish Republic ===
In the interwar Second Polish Republic, the prison was used by Polish authorities to hold numerous notable West Belarusian political prisoners, for example: writers Maksim Tank, Theodore Odrach, Maksim Haretski, Michaś Mašara, Uladzislau Pauliukouski, teacher Barys Kit, musician and composer Ryhor Šyrma, ballet dancer Janka Chvorast. The largest group of prisoners during the interwar years were communists and socialists, and the Communist Party of Western Belorussia frequently attempted to hold protests against the prison, calling it a place of "fascist terror."

=== World War II ===
Following the Soviet occupation of the Baltic states in 1940, the prison was equally used as a temporary holding detention for prisoners who were then deported to the Gulag. Menachem Begin, who later served as sixth Prime Minister of Israel, was notably held in the prison after his arrest in September 1940. In June 1941, during the German invasion, the NKVD shot prisoners at Lukiškės Prison (see NKVD prisoner massacres).

The prison became more notorious during the Nazi occupation of Lithuania, when it was used by the Gestapo and Lithuanian Saugumas as a holding cell for thousands of Jews from the Vilna Ghetto and Poles, picked up in łapankas (roundups) in reprisals for actions by the Polish resistance. The majority, around 100,000 people, were taken to the outskirts of Vilnius and executed at Ponary (Paneriai).

When Soviets reoccupied the territory in 1944, the prison was returned to the NKVD who detained thousands of Polish activists and partisans of Armia Krajowa.

=== Independent Lithuania ===
The prison was the site of Lithuania's last execution in 1995.

As of 2007, it housed approximately 1,000 prisoners and employed around 250 prison guards. Most prisoners there were under temporary arrest awaiting court decisions or transfers to other detention facilities, but there was also a permanent prison with about 180 inmates; about 80 of whom were serving life terms. After more than a century of continuous service, the prison suffered from overcrowding and was in need of improvements.

In 2009, the European Committee for the Prevention of Torture reported "several allegations from prisoners concerning physical ill-treatment inflicted by staff" and that conditions in the parts of the complex that had not been recently renovated had "deteriorated to the extent that they could be described as deplorable."

According to a 2014 plan, the prison was to be relocated to Pravieniškės by 2018. The prison was officially closed on 2 July 2019. After its closure, it became open to the public for tours.

=== Post-closure ===
Following the closure of the prison, the complex was turned into a cultural centre. In 2020, it was used as filming location for the fourth season of Stranger Things. Later that year, the Lithuanian government announced that part of the complex would be sold. In 2022, the Vilnius tourism agency announced that a Stranger Things-themed cell in the complex would be available to rent on Airbnb. This drew controversy from various groups who felt that it overlooked the prison's role in WWII.

Currently the prison complex is popular for concerts and movie screenings. Food court and a bar is also operating and open to citizens and city guests. Guided tours are available in various languages.

== Notable prisoners ==
- Francišak Alachnovič, Belarusian dramatist
- Theodore Odrach, Belarusian-Ukrainian writer. Imprisoned for stealing a chicken, aged 9. Second Polish Republic.
- Menachem Begin, former Prime Minister of Israel
- Mykolas Biržiška, Lithuanian politician
- Felicija Bortkevičienė, publisher of Lietuvos žinios
- Mykolas Burokevičius, Lithuanian communist political leader
- Kazys Boruta, Lithuanian writer
- Bertrand Cantat, French singer
- Janka Chvorast, Belarusian ballet dancer
- Kristupas Čibiras, Lithuanian Catholic priest
- Boris Dekanidze, crime boss (last person executed by Lithuania)
- Andrius Domaševičius, one of the founders of the Social Democratic Party of Lithuania
- Felix Dzerzhinsky, Russian revolutionary and founder of Cheka
- Balys Gajauskas, Soviet dissident
- Mieczysław Gutkowski, Polish lawyer and economist
- Maksim Haretski, Belarusian writer
- Vladimiras Ivanovas, convicted murderer, executed in 1993
- Romuald Jałbrzykowski, Polish Catholic priest and a bishop
- Augustinas Janulaitis, Lithuanian judge
- Kazys Jonaitis, Lithuanian serial killer and rapist
- Barys Kit, Belarusian teacher, mathematician and scientist
- Petras Kraujalis, Lithuanian Catholic priest
- Marcelė Kubiliūtė, Lithuanian intelligence officer
- Vincas Kudirka, editor of Varpas
- Valentinas Laskys, serial killer, executed in 1993
- Vaclau Lastouski, Belarusian activist
- Pranas Liatukas, Minister of Defense of Lithuania
- Mikhasʹ Mashara, Belarusian writer
- Vladas Mironas, Prime Minister of Lithuania
- Uladzislau Pauliukouski, Belarusian writer
- Kazimierz Pelczar, Polish physicist and scientist, pioneer of oncology
- Viktoras Petkus, Soviet dissident
- Kazimierz Pietkiewicz, Polish socialist and independence activist
- Adolfas Ramanauskas (Vanagas), Lithuanian partisan
- Wanda Rewieńska, Polish geographer and resistance activist
- Barbara Skarga, Polish philosopher
- Alfonsas Svarinskas, Lithuanian Catholic priest
- Ryhor Šyrma, Belarusian musician and composer
- Sigitas Tamkevičius, Lithuanian cardinal
- Maksim Tank, Belarusian writer
- Antanas Teleckas, Soviet dissident
- Leopold Tyrmand, Polish writer
- Antanas Varnelis, serial killer, executed in 1994
- Jonas Vileišis, signatory of the Act of Independence of Lithuania
- Jacob Wygodzki, Polish-Lithuanian Jewish politician
- Tomasz Zan, Polish poet
- Žemaitė, Lithuanian writer
