= Kazys Jonaitis =

Lithuanian serial killer and rapist

- Born: 1943 (age 82–83); Algupys, Kaunas County, German-occupied Lithuania
- Other names: "The Pakelių Maniac" "The Roadside Maniac"
- Conviction: Murder x4
- Penalty: 15 years imprisonment (1986); Life imprisonment (2003)

Details
- Victims: 4+
- Span of crimes: 1984–2001
- Country: Lithuania
- State: Vilnius
- Date apprehended: For the final time in June 2001

Kazys Jonaitis (born 1943), known as The Roadside Maniac (Lithuanian: Pakelių maniakas), is a Lithuanian serial killer and rapist who was convicted of killing at least three women in 2001, a few years after being released from a prior murder conviction. For his latter crimes, he was sentenced to life imprisonment.

== Early life and first murder ==
Kazys Jonaitis was born in 1943 in the small village of Algupys, the eldest of seven children. According to accounts provided by family members later on, he and his brothers were brutally beaten by his father with halters and saddles, out of an inexplicable hatred towards his male offspring.

Jonaitis did not complete his education and dropped out to work as a driver. As an adult, he married and divorced twice, and had two children with his wives. Sometime during the 1970s, Jonaitis was jailed twice for theft, for which he served short prison sentences. In 1984, an acquaintance of his paid him 8,000 rubles to kill his wife's lover, Algimantas P., which Jonaitis accepted. After killing the man, he burned the body in a forest, which was locked in the trunk of his car. Jonaitis was eventually arrested, convicted and sentenced to 15 years imprisonment, but was released after serving 12 years of the sentence following a recommendation by the Presidential Pardon Commission.

After his release, Jonaitis began working as a driver for a company in Vilnius and married for the third time, this time to a Ukrainian seamstress named Galina. During this time, he would begin his murder spree, targeting young female hitchhikers.

== Serial murders ==
On April 21, 2001, the decapitated body of 25-year-old Eglė Venskutonytė, a store clerk from Vievis, was discovered tied to a tree and covered with branches in a forest near Elektrėnai. Her identity was confirmed by her mother, who recognized her clothing, shoes and hair. For some time, her parents were considered the prime suspects in her case, but were later ruled out.

About a month later, the body of 20-year-old Jurgita Šteinaitė, from Jonava, was found tied to a tree near a highway bridging Vilnius and Kaunas. Like Venskutonytė, she had been decapitated and showed signs of sexual abuse.

The remains of a third girl, 20-year-old Gerda Šatraitytė, were found in the vicinity not long after. Due to the increasing rate of similar murders in the area, locals began panicking and newspapers started printing descriptions of how serial offenders typically acted like in an attempt to identify a potential suspect. By that time, authorities devised a profile of the perpetrator, wherein they supposed that he was an older male who appeared trustworthy at first glance, had a criminal record and likely lived between Vilnius and Vievis.

== Arrest and investigation ==
In June 2001, after it was determined that a cellphone had been stolen from one of the victims, investigators contacted the mobile operator to check if any calls had been made from it. To their relief, the operator said that a call had been made on a road between Vilnius and Grigiškės, and that the SIM card belonged to a young man who lived in Grigiškės. The man, who turned out to be Jonaitis' stepson, was quickly ruled out as he did not fit the profile, but this led to increased interest in his stepfather.

At first, authorities lacked the necessary evidence to arrest him outright, so they continued monitoring Jonaitis for two more weeks. After receiving a signal from the victim's cellphone, they stopped Jonaitis' car and brought him to the police station for interrogation. While he claimed to know to whom the cellphone belonged, his nervous behaviour made authorities suspicious and led to a search warrant being issued. While searching one of the garages and his apartment, a large number of items belonging to the victims were located, but the most crucial of them was a blue rope with which all the victims had been tied up. In addition, there were also other items that could not be linked to any of the known victims, leading some investigators to believe that there were additional victims.

During the subsequent interviews, Jonaitis admitted to killing the victims, but claimed that they had attempted to blackmail him after having sex with him. To counter his claims, investigators located a surviving victim who rebuked all of his claims. Upon examining DNA samples provided by her, it was conclusively confirmed that she had been raped by Jonaitis. When it came to the murder victims, the authorities established that he hit them on the head and rape them, sometimes while they were unconscious, before bludgeoning them to death. One of the victims was hit on the head with an axe.

== Trial and imprisonment ==
Jonaitis was charged for the three murders and the rape of his fourth victim. Before the start of his first trial, he attempted suicide and was placed in intensive care. Due to this, all future court hearings related to the case were held behind closed doors.

While awaiting trial at the Lukiškės Prison, Jonaitis was ostracized by fellow prisoners, who beat and threw them out of their cells. He was eventually placed with Antanas Jackus, a long-serving inmate who got him to confess to his crimes and later testified against him at trial. He soon gained notoriety for writing numerous frivolous complaints about his treatment from prison staff, and even went on hunger strike.

In 2003, he was found guilty on all counts and sentenced to life imprisonment. His wife, who was accused of wearing the victims' jewellery despite supposedly knowing that they were stolen was convicted of stealing property and sentenced to three years imprisonment. She later applied for amnesty, which was granted shortly afterwards.

Since his incarceration, Jonaitis has repeatedly claimed to be a reformed man and has applied for parole on multiple occasions for reasons such as old age and his alleged reform. So far, all of his applications have been denied by the Court of Appeal, whose board members have expressed skepticism about his claims, coupled with concerns that he might still pose a danger to those around him. This was exemplified by an incident dating back to 2008, when Jonaitis attempted to gouge out a prison guard's eyes out after they got into an argument about using the prison's phone.

== See also ==
- List of serial killers by country

== Bibliography ==
- Knispelis, Egidijus (February 1, 2012). Įvykiai, sukrėtę Lietuvą [Events that shocked Lithuania] (in Lithuanian). Apple. ISBN 9786094033193.
