= Wanda Rewieńska =

Polish geographer (1897–1942)

- Born: 22 November 1897; Kupriańsk
- Died: 21 November 1942 (aged 44); Vilnius
- Other name: Wanda Rewieńska-Pawełkowa
- Education: Stefan Batory University
- Occupation: Geographer
- Known for: Resistance fighting
- Spouse: Alojzy Pawełek

Wanda Rewieńska-Pawełkowa (22 November 1897 in Kupriańsk in the Kharkov Governorate – 21 November 1942 in Vilnius) was a Polish geographer, achieved the rank of Scoutmaster in the Polish Scouting Association, and became a resistance fighter during World War II. She was murdered by Nazi occupying forces.

== Biography ==
Wanda Rewieńska was the daughter of Aleksander Rewieński, a railway worker, and Stefania Stulczyńska. After attending high school in Vilnius, Lithuania, she passed her high school final exams in 1916 in Petrograd (now called Saint Petersburg), Russia. In 1917–1918 she studied at the Faculty of Physics and Mathematics of the Higher Women's Courses in Kiev. During this period, she became active in the underground Polish Scouting and Guiding Association movement, organized secret instructor courses near Kiev, and was a member of the Polish Scouting Command in Ruthenia and Russia (based in Kiev).

=== Geographer ===
In November 1918, she moved to Warsaw, Poland, and soon married physician Alojzy Pawełek, whom she had met in Kiev. At the University of Warsaw, she continued her studies in mathematics and physics, but was interrupted due to illness. Later she graduated in geography at the Faculty of Mathematics and Natural Sciences of the Stefan Batory University in Vilnius (1929, master's thesis: Vilnius Isochrony). In Warsaw, she continued her scouting activities. She headed the Scout Supplies Committee and cooperated with the Harcerz magazine. After moving back to Vilnius, she was active in the Vilnius Association of Polish Youth Associations. In 1928 she received the highest possible rank of scoutmaster.

After her husband's sudden death in 1930, she focused on her professional work. She took part in international geographical congresses in Toulouse, France (1932), and Warsaw (1937).

She taught as an assistant professor and then as an adjunct professor at the Department of Geography at the University of Vilnius. In 1934, she defended her doctorate (thesis: Bereza Kartuska, Selected materials from the anthropogeography of the town), and in 1939 she worked on her habilitation thesis titled: Cities and towns in northeastern Poland, Topographic location, layout, physiognomy. In the years 1937–1939, Rewieńska's work was published in the monthly Scout magazine Na Przełaj. She did not have time to lecture at the University of Vilnius due to the outbreak of World War II.

=== Freedom fighter ===
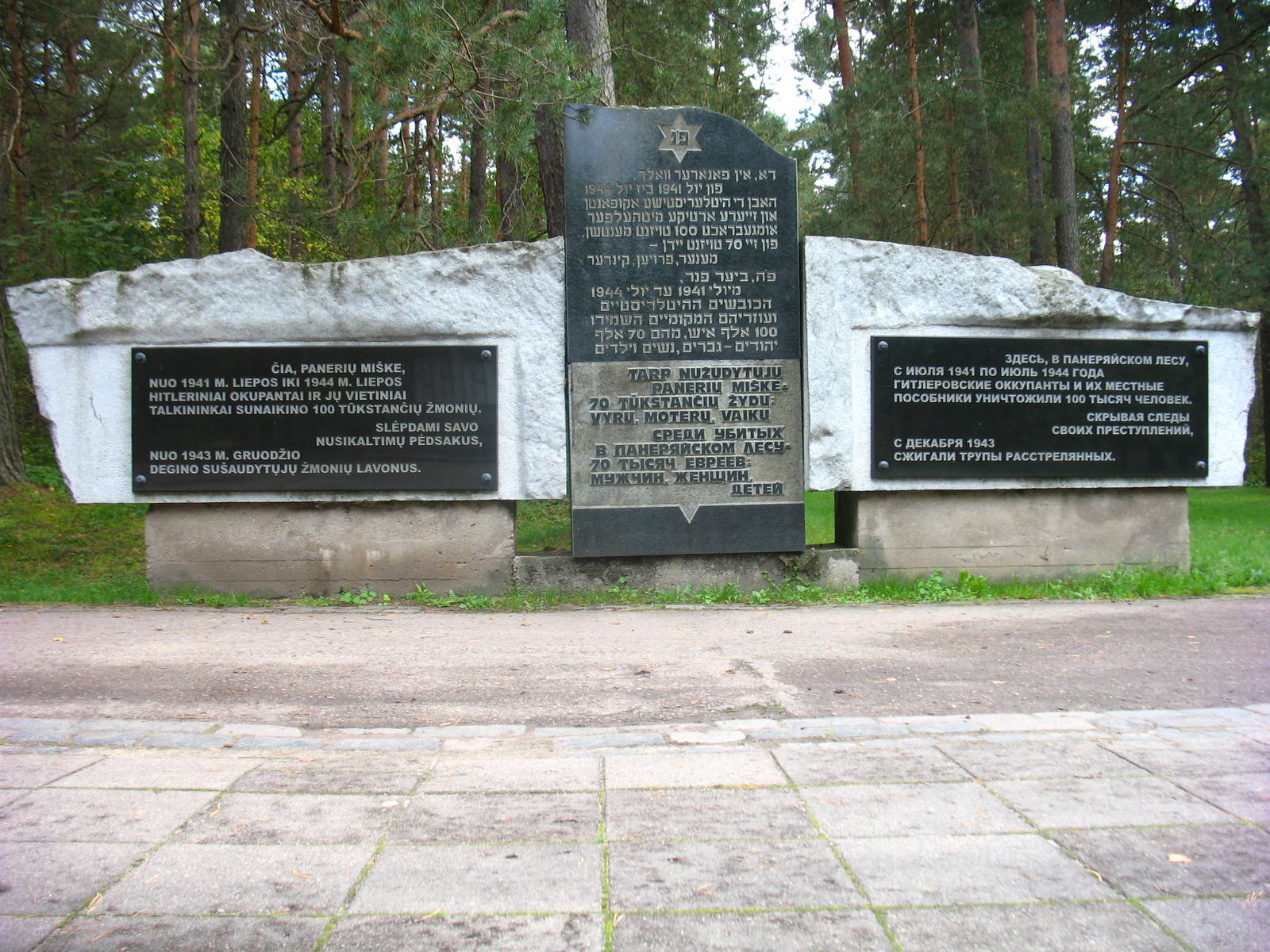
Memorial to those executed in Ponary during World War II.

With the German occupation of Poland in 1939, Rewieńska became involved in Polish resistance activities, including: lending an apartment to fugitives and organizing false documents for Polish officers and people of Jewish nationality. She was finally arrested by the Germans in April 1942, imprisoned in a Gestapo prison and then in the Lukiškės Prison in collective cell no. 31.

According to Jackowski, "After being captured she knew what awaited her, but she went around giving words of consolation and support to her fellow female prisoners till the very end." On 21 November 1942, she was transported from the prison to a town outside Vilnius and was murdered in a mass execution by Lithuanian collaborators of the Germans at Ponary where many thousands of people were killed over the course of the War.

== Selected publications ==
As a scientist, Rewieńska published works mainly under her maiden name, Wanda Rewieńska. Her publications concerned settlement geography, communication geography, anthropogeography and physical geography, including: Area and population density of urban communes in Poland [1] (1935), Topographic location of urban settlements in north-eastern Poland [2] (1937), Distribution of cities and towns in north-eastern Poland (1938) [3], Vilnius railway junction in the light of numbers. Passenger traffic (1935), Suburban traffic at the Vilnius railway station (1936).
