= Boris Dekanidze =

Lithuanian murderer (1962–1995)

- Born: 13 December 1962; Vilnius, Lithuanian SSR, Soviet Union
- Died: 12 July 1995 (aged 32); Lukiškės Prison, Vilnius, Lithuania
- Status: Executed by shooting
- Motive: Victim was writing about his criminal activities
- Conviction: Murder with aggravating circumstances
- Penalty: Death

Details
- Victims: Vitas Lingys, 33
- Date: 12 October 1993
- Country: Lithuania
- Location: Vilnius

Boris Dekanidze (Georgian: ბორის დეკანიძე. 13 December 1962 – 12 July 1995) was the head of the Vilnius Brigade criminal organization in Lithuania. In 1994, he was convicted of ordering the murder of Lithuanian journalist Vitas Lingys and was executed by Lithuania. Dekanidze was the last person executed in Lithuania prior to the abolition of capital punishment in 1998.

== Biography ==
Dekanidze was born on 13 December 1962 in Vilnius to Georgian Jewish immigrants. He was a stateless person, not having been granted citizenship in either Lithuania or Georgia. In Vilnius, he was the leader of the Vilnius Brigade criminal organization. The Vilnius Brigade mostly consisted of Lithuanian-born people of various ethnic backgrounds (mostly Soviet Jews, ethnic Russians, ethnic Poles, and Lithuanians), although Boris Dekanidze as well as his brother were Georgian Jews.

In 1993, after receiving a number of death threats, Vitas Lingys, one of the founders and publishers of the newspaper Respublika, was shot at point-blank range near his home in Vilnius. Dekanidze was arrested and charged with ordering the murder, which police said was a contract killing carried out by Igor Akhremov.

In 1994, Dekanidze was convicted of deliberate murder by a three-judge panel. Dekanidze claimed he was innocent, as the evidence against him was primarily the testimony of Igor Akhremov (a former hitman for the Vilnius Brigade), who testified to having carried out the killing on Dekanidze's orders. On 10 November 1994, Dekanidze was sentenced to death and Akhremov was sentenced to life imprisonment. Lithuanian authorities shut down a nuclear power plant after a terrorist threat was made against it the day after the convictions were handed down. Dekanidze appealed the decision to the Supreme Court, but it ruled in February 1995 that there were no grounds for reviewing the death sentence. His appeal for clemency to President Algirdas Brazauskas was also refused.

Dekanidze was executed on 12 July 1995 in Lukiškės Prison by a single pistol shot to the back of his head.

Dekanidze's execution was the last in Lithuania, and capital punishment was abolished for all crimes in 1998 after the Lithuanian Constitutional Court ruled it unconstitutional.

In 2012, Akhremov's sentence was reduced to 25 years. He was released from prison in 2018.

== See also ==
- List of most recent executions by jurisdiction
- Capital punishment in Lithuania
