= Kauno diena =

- Type: Daily newspaper
- Format: compact
- Owner(s): Diena Media News
- Publisher: Diena Media News
- Editor-in-chief: Arūnas Andriuškevičius
- Founded: 1945
- Language: Lithuanian
- Circulation: 38,000 (2005)
- Sister newspapers: Vilniaus diena Klaipėdos diena
- ISSN: 1392-7639
- Website: http://www.kauno.diena.lt

Kauno diena (Kaunas Daily) is a Lithuanian daily newspaper, printed in Kaunas.

== History and profile ==
In 1998, Kauno diena was bought by Norwegian media giant Orkla Media subsidiary Orkla Press. In December 2006 Orkla sold its media stakes to the investment company Hermis Capital. Its daily circulation in 2005 was about 38,000 copies.

It was formerly known as Tarybų Lietuva (Soviet Lithuania, 1945–1950) and Kauno Tiesa (Kaunas Truth, 1950–1992).

The present editor in chief of Kauno diena is Arūnas Andriuškevičius.

== Previous editors ==
- 1945 – Jonas Šimkus
- 1945–1950 – Donatas Roda
- 1950 – Juozas Chlivickas
- 1951–1953 – Povilas Putrimas
- 1954–1956 – Julius Čygas
- 1956–1958 – V.Norvaiša
- 1958–1960 – Juozas Leonavičius
- 1960–1987 – Zenonas Baltušnikas
- 1987–1998 – Teklė Mačiulienė
- 1999–2007 – Aušra Lėka
- 2007 – Kęstutis Jauniškis

== See also ==
- Eastern Bloc information dissemination
