= Order of precedence in Lithuania =

Relative preeminence of officials for ceremonial purposes

The Lithuanian order of precedence is a nominal and symbolic hierarchy of important positions within the Government of Lithuania. Administered by the Ministry of Foreign Affairs, the hierarchy does not determine the order of succession for the office of President of the Republic of Lithuania, which is instead specified by the Constitution of Lithuania.

== Lithuanian order of precedence ==
1. President of Lithuania (Gitanas Nausėda)
2. Speaker of the Seimas (Viktorija Čmilytė-Nielsen)
3. Prime Minister of Lithuania (Ingrida Šimonytė)
4. President of the Constitutional Court of Lithuania (Danutė Jočienė)
5. Former Presidents of Lithuania:
  1. Vytautas Landsbergis
  2. Valdas Adamkus
  3. Rolandas Paksas
  4. Artūras Paulauskas
  5. Dalia Grybauskaitė
6. Signatories of the Act of the Re-Establishment of the State of Lithuania, including:
  1. Chair of Liberal Movement Political Group Eugenijus Gentvilas
  2. MP Laima Andrikienė
  3. Former MEP Algirdas Saudargas
  4. MEP Rasa Juknevičienė
  5. Member of the Seimas Emanuelis Zingeris
  6. Former Speaker of the Seimas Česlovas Juršėnas
  7. Former Prime Minister Kazimira Prunskienė
  8. Former Prime Minister Albertas Šimėnas
  9. Former Prime Minister Gediminas Vagnorius
  10. Former Prime Minister Aleksandras Abišala
7. First Deputy Speaker of the Seimas (Jurgis Razma)
8. Ministers of the Republic of Lithuania:
  1. Minister of Environment (Simonas Gentvilas)
  2. Minister of Energy (Dainius Kreivys)
  3. Minister of Finance (Gintarė Skaistė)
  4. Minister of National Defence (Arvydas Anušauskas)
  5. Minister of Culture (Simonas Kairys)
  6. Minister of Social Security and Labour (Monika Navickienė)
  7. Minister of Transport and Communications (Marius Skuodis)
  8. Minister of Health (Arūnas Dulkys)
  9. Minister of Education and Science (Jurgita Šiugždinienė)
  10. Minister of Justice (Evelina Dobrovolska)
  11. Minister of Economy (Aušrinė Armonaitė)
  12. Minister of Foreign Affairs (Gabrielius Landsbergis)
  13. Minister of the Interior (Agnė Bilotaitė)
  14. Minister of Agriculture (Kęstutis Navickas)
9. Foreign Ambassadors, accredited to the Republic of Lithuania (by date of presentation of credentials except Nuncio who is first)
  1. Holy See (Petar Rajič)
  2. Sweden (Maria Christina Lundqvist)
  3. Germany (Angelika Viets)
  4. France (Philippe Jeantaud)
  5. Latvia (Einars Semanis)
  6. Denmark (Dan E. Frederiksen)
  7. Canada (Alain Hausser)
  8. United Kingdom (Claire Lawrence)
  9. Italy (Francesco Fransoni)
  10. Norway (Karsten Klepsvik)
  11. Finland (Christer Michelsson)
  12. Turkey (Aydan Yamancan)
  13. Czech Republic (Bohumil Mazánek)
  14. United States (Anne Hall)
  15. China (Shen Zhifei)
  16. Poland (Urszula Doroszewska)
  17. Estonia (Jana Vanaveski)
  18. Russia (Alexander Udaltsov)
  19. Romania (Dan Adrian Bălănescu)
  20. Ukraine (Volodymyr Yatsenkivskyi)
  21. Belarus (Aleksandr Korol)
  22. Kazakhstan (Baurzhan Mukhamejanov)
  23. Georgia (Khatuna Salukvadze)
  24. Japan (Toyoei Shigeeda)
  25. Netherlands (Bert van der Lingen)
  26. Hungary (Kátai Ildikó)
  27. Spain (Miguel Arias Estevez)
  28. Sovereign Military Order of Malta (Manfred Leo Mautner Markhof)
  29. Greece (Vassiliki Dicopoulou)
  30. Ireland (David Noonan)
  31. Moldova (Serghei Mihov)
  32. Azerbaijan (vacant)
  33. Armenia (Tigran Mkrtchyan)
  34. Croatia (Krešimir Kedmenec)
  35. Israel (Amir Maimon)
10. President of the Supreme Court of Lithuania (Rimvydas Norkus)
11. President of the Supreme Administrative Court of Lithuania (Gintaras Kryževičius)
12. Deputy Speakers of the Seimas:
  1. Andrius Mazuronis
  2. Vytautas Mitalas
  3. Radvilė Morkūnaitė-Mikulėnienė
  4. Julius Sabatauskas
  5. Paulius Saudargas
  6. Jonas Jarutis
13. Leader of the Opposition of the Seimas (vacant)
14. Chairs of the Committees of the Seimas:
  1. Chair of the Committee on Foreign Affairs (Laima Andrikienė)
  2. Chair of the Committee on Audit (Zigmantas Balčytis)
  3. Chair of the Committee on Budget and Finance (Mykolas Majauskas)
  4. Chair of the Committee on Economics (Kazys Starkevičius)
  5. Chair of the Committee on Rural Affairs (Viktoras Pranckietis)
  6. Chair of the Committee on Culture (Vytautas Juozapaitis)
  7. Chair of the Committee on National Security and Defence (Laurynas Kasčiūnas)
  8. Chair of the Committee on Social Affairs and Labour (Mindaugas Lingė)
  9. Chair of the Committee on Health Affairs (Antanas Matulas)
  10. Chair of the Committee on Education and Science (Artūras Žukauskas)
  11. Chair of the Committee on Legal Affairs (Stasys Šedbaras)
  12. Chair of the Committee on State Administration and Local Authorities (Ričardas Juška)
  13. Chair of the Committee on Human Rights (Tomas Vytautas Raskevičius)
15. Chairs of the Political Groups of the Seimas of the Republic of Lithuania:
  1. Homeland Union - Lithuanian Christian Democrats Political Group (Radvilė Morkūnaitė-Mikulėnienė)
  2. Liberal Movement Political Group (Eugenijus Gentvilas)
  3. Freedom Party Political Group (Vytautas Mitalas)
  4. Farmers and Greens Union Political Group (Aušrinė Norkienė)
  5. Democrats "For Lithuania" Political Group (Linas Kukuraitis)
  6. Lithuanian Social Democratic Party Political Group (Gintautas Paluckas)
  7. Labour Party Political Group (Viktoras Fiodorovas)
  8. Lithuanian Regions Political Group (Jonas Pinskus)
16. Members of the Thirteenth Seimas
17. Members of the European Parliament representing Lithuania:
  1. Petras Auštrevičius
  2. Vilija Blinkevičiūtė
  3. Andrius Kubilius
  4. Rasa Juknevičienė
  5. Juozas Olekas
  6. Aušra Maldeikienė
  7. Bronis Ropė
  8. Valdemar Tomaševski
  9. Viktor Uspaskich
18. The Seimas Ombudsman (Erika Leonaitė)
19. The highest hierarch of the Catholic Church in Lithuania (Cardinal Audrys Juozas Bačkis)
20. Chief of Defence (general Valdemaras Rupšys)
21. Chairman of the Board of the Bank of Lithuania (Gediminas Šimkus)
22. Prosecutor General of Lithuania (Nida Grunskienė)
23. Auditor General at National Audit Office of Lithuania (Mindaugas Macijauskas)
24. Members of the Constitutional Court of Lithuania:
  1. Elvyra Baltutytė
  2. Gintaras Goda
  3. Vytautas Greičius
  4. Danutė Jočienė
  5. Gediminas Mesonis
  6. Vytas Milius
  7. Daiva Petrylaitė
  8. Janina Stripeikienė
25. Judges of the Supreme Court of Lithuania
  1. Armanas Abramavičius
  2. Rima Ažubalytė
  3. Dalia Bajerčiūtė
  4. Danguolė Bublienė
  5. Alė Bukavinienė
  6. Gražina Davidonienė
  7. Olegas Fedosiukas
  8. Eligijus Gladutis
  9. Virgilijus Grabinskas
  10. Gabrielė Juodkaitė-Granskienė
  11. Aurelijus Gutauskas
  12. Birutė Janavičiūtė
  13. Janina Januškienė
  14. Sigita Jokimaitė
  15. Audronė Kartanienė
  16. Pranas Kuconis
  17. Egidijus Laužikas
  18. Andžej Maciejevski
  19. Vytautas Masiokas
  20. Rimvydas Norkus
  21. Algis Norkūnas
  22. Artūras Pažarskis
  23. Alvydas Pikelis
  24. Aldona Rakauskienė
  25. Artūras Ridikas
  26. Sigita Rudėnaitė
  27. Gediminas Sagatys
  28. Antanas Simniškis
  29. Donatas Šernas
  30. Tomas Šeškauskas
  31. Algirdas Taminskas
  32. Dalia Vasarienė
  33. Vincas Verseckas
26. Chancellor of the Office of the President of the Republic of Lithuania (Giedrius Krasauskas)
27. Chancellor of the Seimas (Daiva Raudonienė)
28. Chancellor of the Government (Algirdas Stončaitis)
29. Director of the State Security Department of Lithuania (Darius Jauniškis)
30. Director of the Special Investigation Service (Žydrūnas Bartkus)
31. Chairman of the Court of Appeal of Lithuania (Algimantas Valantinas)
32. Vice-Ministers of the Republic of Lithuania
33. Chancellors of the ministries of the Republic of Lithuania
34. City Mayor (at city event)
35. President of Lithuanian Academy of Sciences (Jūras Banys)
36. President of Lithuanian Bishops' Conference (Gintaras Grušas)
37. Highest Authorities of traditional religious confessions:
  1. Evangelical Lutheran Church of Lithuania (Mindaugas Sabutis)
  2. Lithuanian Evangelical Reformed Church (Tomas Šernas)
  3. Greek Catholic Church (Pavel Jachimec)
  4. Jewish Religious Community) (Sholom Ber Krinsky)
  5. Karaite Religious Community) (Jurij Špakovski)
  6. Sunni Muftiate of Lithuania (Ramazanas Jakubauskas)
  7. Eastern Orthodoxy (Inokentijus, Metropolitan of Vilnius and Lithuania)
  8. Religious Community of Old Believers (Grigorij Bojarov)
38. Ambassadors of the Republic of Lithuania
39. Police Commissioner General of Lithuania (Linas Pernavas)
40. Head of the Lithuanian State Border Guard Service (gen. Renatas Požėla)
41. Director of the VIP Protection Department of Lithuania (gen. Rymantas Mockevičius)
42. Head of the Public Security Service (gen. Ričardas Pocius)
43. Equal Opportunities Ombudsperson of Lithuania (Agneta Skardžiuvienė)
44. Children's rights Ombudsperson of Lithuania (Edita Žiobienė)
45. Former Speakers of the Seimas:
  1. Viktoras Muntianas
  2. Arūnas Valinskas
  3. Vydas Gedvilas
  4. Loreta Graužinienė
46. Former Prime Ministers of the Republic of Lithuania
47. Chairman of the Lithuanian Central Electoral Commission (Laura Matjošaitytė)
48. Chairman of the Chief Official Ethics Commission of the Republic of Lithuania (Edmundas Sakalauskas)
49. Rectors of the High Schools – Graduate Universities
50. Advisers to the President of the Republic of Lithuania
51. Advisers to the Speaker of the Seimas
52. Advisers to the Prime Minister of the Republic of Lithuania
53. Chiefs of the main branches of the Lithuanian Armed Forces:
  1. Commander of the Lithuanian Land Force (general Valdemaras Rupšys)
  2. Commander of the Lithuanian Air Force (colonel Dainius Guzas)
  3. Commander of the Lithuanian Navy (captain Arūnas Mockus)
54. Chief of the Joint Staff of the Lithuanian Armed Forces (gen. mjr. Vitalijus Vaikšnoras)
55. Representative of the Government of the Republic of Lithuania in the European Court of Human Rights (Karolina Bubnytė)
56. Director of the Department of State and Diplomatic Protocol of the Ministry of Foreign Affairs (Neilas Tankevičius)
57. President of the Association of Local Authorities in Lithuania (Ričardas Malinauskas)
58. Mayors of other cities of Lithuania
59. Government representatives in the counties
60. Chargé d‘Affaires of foreign states
