= Ernestas Spruogis =

Vice President of the Supreme Administrative Court

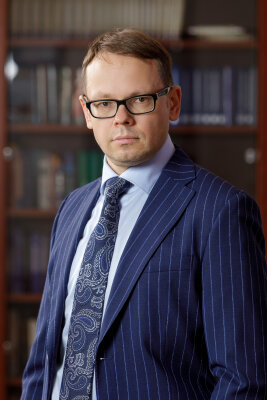
- Official portrait, 2023

Vice President of the Supreme Administrative Court
- Incumbent
- Assumed office 2 February 2023
- Preceded by: Skirgailė Žalimienė

Judge of the Supreme Administrative Court
- Incumbent
- Assumed office March 2021

Judge of the Vilnius Regional Administrative Court
- In office 2008–2021

Personal details
- Born: 1975 (age 50–51) Vilnius, Lithuania
- Education: Vilnius University
- Occupation: Judge

Ernestas Spruogis (Lithuanian: [/ˈɛr.nɛs.tɐs ˈspruː.ɔ.ɡʲɪs/]; born 1975) is a Lithuanian lawyer, legal scholar, and judge, who is currently serving as the Vice President of the Supreme Administrative Court of Lithuania since 2 February 2023. He has been a justice of the Supreme Administrative Court since March 2021, and previously served as a judge at the Vilnius Regional Administrative Court from 2008 to 2021.

== Education ==
Spruogis studied law at Vilnius University Law Faculty, where he obtained his Master of Laws degree in 1998.

He pursued doctoral studies in law at the Lithuanian Law Academy (later renamed the Lithuanian Law University and now Mykolas Romeris University) and in 2002 was awarded the degree of Doctor of Law (PhD) for his dissertation on issues of legal interpretation and the application of law in public administration.

== Judicial career ==
Spruogis began his legal career as a lawyer at Medicinos bankas (1996–1999). He later worked at the Constitutional Court of Lithuania, first as an assistant to a justice (1997–2005) and subsequently as head of the Legal Division (2005–2008).

In 2008, he was appointed a judge of the Vilnius Regional Administrative Court, where he served for more than twelve years until 2021.

In October 2019, President Gitanas Nausėda suggested appointing Spruogis as a judge of the Court of Appeal. The Judicial Council did not approve his candidacy, explaining that he lacked experience in criminal law, since his work up to that point was focused on administrative cases and he had not dealt with criminal proceedings.
