= Egidijus Žironas =

Former President of the Court of Appeal of Lithuania

President of the Court of Appeal of Lithuania
- In office 30 June 2010 – 30 June 2015
- President: Dalia Grybauskaitė; Gitanas Nausėda
- Prime Minister: Algirdas Butkevičius; Saulius Skvernelis; Ingrida Šimonytė
- Succeeded by: Nerijus Meilutis

Judge of the Court of Appeal
- In office April 2009 – 30 June 2015

Personal details
- Born: 23 April 1954 (age 72) Šiauliai, Lithuania
- Spouse: Jūratė
- Children: Agnė, Gintarė
- Education: Vilnius University
- Occupation: Judge

Egidijus Žironas (Lithuanian: [ɛˈɡʲɪ.dʲɪ.jʊs ʒɪˈrɔ.nɐs]; born 23 April 1954) is a Lithuanian judge and jurist who served as the President of the Court of Appeal from 30 June 2010 until 30 June 2015. He also was a jurist in different kinds of law firms in Lithuania.

== Education ==
In 1972, he graduated from Šiauliai J. Janonis Secondary School, and in 1981, from the Faculty of Law at Vilnius University with a degree in law, obtaining the qualification of a lawyer.

== Career ==
Since November 1981, he worked at the Forensic Science Institute's Traseological-Ballistic Examination Laboratory as a trainee expert, research associate, senior expert, and deputy head. Since December 1986, he served as a judge at the 4th Vilnius City Court.

From June 1992 to January 1994, he was a lawyer at UAB "Litbaum", and from March to December 1994, he was the chief legal adviser at UAB "Litbaum Export-Import". From January 1995, he practiced law at attorney E. Žironas’s law office. In January 1999, he became a judge at the Vilnius Regional Court. Since April 2009, he has served as a judge at the Lithuanian Court of Appeal, and from June 30, 2010, he has held the position of the court's president.
