= Ramūnas Gadliauskas =

Vice President of the Judicial Council
- Incumbent
- Assumed office 23 June 2026
- President: Danguolė Bublienė
- Preceded by: Nerijus Meilutis

Judge of the Supreme Administrative Court
- Incumbent
- Assumed office April 2012

Personal details
- Born: 28 September 1967 (age 59) Anykščiai District Municipality, Lithuania
- Education: Vilnius University
- Occupation: Judge

Ramūnas Gadliauskas (born 28 September 1967) is a Lithuanian lawyer and judge who has served as the Vice President of the Judicial Council since 24 June 2026. He was previously chairman of the Anykščiai District Court.

== Biography ==
In 1985, he graduated from Anykščiai Jonas Biliūnas Secondary School. From 1985 to 1992 (with a break for service in the Soviet army), he studied law at the Faculty of Law of Vilnius University, and obtained a lawyer's qualification.

From June 1991 to November 1993, he was a trainee and investigator at the Anykščiai District District Prosecutor's Office (Criminal Investigation Department under the Prosecutor General's Office of the Republic of Lithuania), from November 1993, a judge of the Anykščiai District District Court, from 1996, the chairman of the court, from April 1999, and the chairman of the Panevėžys Regional Administrative Court.

Gadliauskas has been a member of the Lithuanian Lawyers' Association since 1993, as well as a member of the Board of the Lithuanian Judges' Association since 2006.

He has been a member of the Hall of Honor of Anykščiai Jonas Biliūnas Gymnasium since 2006.

Gadliauskas is married to Daiva Vasiulytė-Gadliauskienė (born 1967), who is also a lawyer and a judge. They have a son, Žilvinas, (born 1990), and a daughter Rugilė (born 1997).

He speaks both Russian and English.
