= Nerijus Meilutis =

President of the Appeal Court of Lithuania

President of the Court of Appeal of Lithuania
- In office 22 June 2021 – 22 June 2026
- President: Gitanas Nausėda
- Prime Minister: Ingrida Šimonytė; Gintautas Paluckas; Inga Ruginienė
- Chancellor: Jelena Vasilionokienė
- Preceded by: Algimantas Valantinas
- Succeeded by: Ernestas Rimšelis (acting)

Vice President of the Judicial Council of Lithuania
- In office 28 October 2024 – 22 June 2026
- Chairwoman: Danguolė Bublienė
- Preceded by: Algimantas Valantinas
- Succeeded by: Ramūnas Gadliauskas

Judge of Kaunas City District Court
- In office July 2004 – July 2010
- President: Valdas Adamkus; Dalia Grybauskaitė

President of Kaunas County Court
- In office 22 August 2011 – 22 June 2021
- President: Dalia Grybauskaitė; Gitanas Nausėda
- Preceded by: Vytautas Zelianka
- Succeeded by: Arūnas Purvainis

Personal details
- Born: 6 August 1974 (age 52) Kaunas, Lithuania
- Education: Mykolas Romeris University

Nerijus Meilutis (Lithuanian: [/ˈnɛrɪjus ˈmɛɪlʊtɪs/]; born 6 August 1974) is a Lithuanian judge and legal professional who served as the President of the Court of Appeal of Lithuania from 22 June 2021 until 22 June 2026. He has been a Judge at Kaunas City District Court and later Judge of Kaišiadorys district court.

== Education ==
In 1996, he graduated from the Lithuanian Police Academy with the bachelor of law, in 1998 – from the Mykolas Romeris University with the master of law qualification.

== Career ==
1998–2004 – Pre-trial investigation officer of the Kaunas branch of the STT. From July 2004 to July 2010, he was a judge at Kaunas City District Court. From July 2010 to August 2011, he was a judge of the Kaišiadorys District Court, the president of this court. From 22 August 2011 to 23 August 2016 and from 1 September 2016 to 2021, he was the President of Kaunas Regional Court, from August 2011 to 2021 he was a judge of that court.

President of the Appeal Court of Lithuania from 22 June 2021 until 22 June 2026.

== Social activities ==
From 2012 to 2020 (2 terms), he was a member of the Judicial Council.

From November 2016 to January 2019, he was the coordinator of the Administrative Committee and, from May 2018 to June 2020, a representative of the Judicial Council in the Executive Board of the European Network of Councils for the Judiciary. From March 2017 until now he is a lecturer at the Department of Public Law of the Faculty of Law of Vytautas Magnus University, since 1 February 2021 he has been an associate professor.

He is fluent in English and Russian.
