= Skirgailė Žalimienė =

Lithuanian judge and university teacher (born 1972)

Her Excellency Skirgailė Žalimienė

President of the Supreme Administrative Court of Lithuania
- Incumbent
- Assumed office 26 July 2022
- President: Gitanas Nausėda
- Prime Minister: Ingrida Šimonytė; Gintautas Paluckas
- Vice President: Ernestas Spruogis
- Preceded by: Gintaras Kryževičius

Vice President of the Supreme Administrative Court of Lithuania
- In office 1 July 2019 – 25 July 2022
- President: Dalia Grybauskaitė; Gitanas Nausėda
- Prime Minister: Saulius Skvernelis; Ingrida Šimonytė

Member of the Judicial Council of Lithuania
- Incumbent
- Assumed position 28 November 2022
- President: Gitanas Nausėda
- Prime Minister: Ingrida Šimonytė; Gintautas Paluckas

Secretary of the Judicial Council
- Incumbent
- Assumed office 29 April 2022
- Preceded by: Gintaras Kryževičius

Personal details
- Born: Skirgailė Žaltauskaitė; 1972 (age 53–54) Vilnius, Lithuania
- Spouse: Dainius Žalimas (div. 2016)
- Education: Vilnius University
- Occupation: Judge

Skirgailė Žalimienė (Lithuanian: [/ˈskʲɪrˌɡaɪ̯lʲɛ ˈʒɐˌlʲɪˌmʲɛːnɛ/]; born 1972) is a Lithuanian judge who has been serving as the President of the Supreme Administrative Court of Lithuania since 26 July 2022. In addition to her judicial role, she is a legal researcher and Europeanist, holding the position of professor at the Faculty of Law, Vilnius University.

== Studies ==
In 1991–1996, she studied at the Faculty of Law of Vilnius University, where she obtained a lawyer's qualification. Since February 1998, she has been an assistant at the Faculty of Law of Vilnius University, since September 2002, a lecturer, since November 2002, an associate professor, and now a professor.

== Career ==
In 2008 she was a candidate for judge of the Supreme Court of Lithuania. She was appointed as a judge to the Supreme Administrative Court of Lithuania by Valdas Adamkus in August 2008. 2019–2022 Deputy President of the Supreme Administrative Court of Lithuania. Since July 2022, President of the Supreme Administrative Court of Lithuania.
