= Prosecutor General's Office of Lithuania =

- Lietuvos Generalinė Prokuratūra
- Emblem of the Prosecutor General's Office

Agency overview
- Formed: 1919; 1990 (restored)
- Jurisdiction: Government of Lithuania
- Headquarters: Vilnius, Lithuania
- Employees: 1090
- Annual budget: €41.3 million
- Prosecutor General responsible: Nida Grunskienė

The Prosecutor General's Office of Lithuania (Lithuanian: Lietuvos Generalinė Prokuratūra) is the supreme institution conducting prosecution in Lithuania. Prosecutors of the Prosecutor General's Office have prosecutorial powers to act in all courts of Lithuania. The Prosecutor General is accountable to the President and the Seimas for the activities of the Prosecutor's Office, and provides the Government with information about the non-procedural activities of the Prosecutor's Office.

Lithuania participates in the European Public Prosecutor's Office and the Prosecutor General's Office delegates its prosecutors to the organization.

== History ==
The formation of the prosecutor general began in January 1919 and the first prosecutor general, Kazys Samajauskas, was appointed in February 1919. The current Prosecutor's Office was established in 1990.

In 1995, it became the Prosecutor General's Office under the Supreme Court of Lithuania, and at the same time, Vilnius, Kaunas, Klaipėda, Šiauliai and Panevėžys District Prosecutor's Offices were established. In 2003, the name of the institution was changed to the Prosecutor General's Office.

== See also ==
- Law of Lithuania
- European Public Prosecutor's Office
