= Valantinas =

- Lithuanian surname
- m.: Valantinas
- f.: (unmarried): Valantinaitė
- f.: (married): Valantinienė

Valantinas is a family name.

It may refer to:

- Algimantas Valantinas (born 1961), Lithuanian judge
- Rytis Valantinas, Lithuanian artist, the designer of the 200-litas banknote
- Indrė Valantinaitė (born 1984), Lithuanian poet
