= List of ambassadors to Lithuania =

This is a list of ambassadors to Lithuania. Note that some ambassadors are responsible for more than one country while others are directly accredited to Vilnius.

== Current Ambassadors to Lithuania ==
Sending country	Presentation of the credentials	Location of resident embassy	Ambassador
Afghanistan		Warsaw, Poland	Gul Hussain Ahmadi
Albania		Warsaw, Poland	Mimoza Halimi
Algeria		Warsaw, Poland	Mohamed Salah Eddine Belaid
Angola		Warsaw, Poland	Manuel Pedro Chaves
Argentina		Warsaw, Poland	Alicia Irene Falkowski
Armenia		Vilnius, Lithuania	Ara Margarian
Australia		Warsaw, Poland	Benjamin Hayes
Austria		Vienna, Austria	Yvonne Raffaela Tončić-Sorinj
Azerbaijan		Vilnius, Lithuania	Tamerlan Garayev
Bangladesh	16.03.2010	Moscow, Russia	Saiful Hoque
Belarus	16.05.2006	Vilnius, Lithuania	Vladimir Drazhin
Belgium		Vilnius, Lithuania	Peter Lescouhier (Ambassador Agréé)
Benin	12.01.2009	Copenhagen, Denmark	Arlette Claudine Kpedetin Dagnon Vignikin
Bolivia	24.01.2011	Copenhagen, Denmark	Eugenio Poma Anaguaya
Bosnia and Herzegovina	14.01.2009	Copenhagen, Denmark	Muhamed Hajdarević
Botswana		Stockholm, Sweden	Bernadette Sebage Rathedi (Ambassador Agréé)
Brazil	06.10.2010	Copenhagen, Denmark	Goncalo de Barros Carvalho e Mello Mourao
Bulgaria	22.01.2008	Warsaw, Poland	Konstanty Radziwiłł
Burkina Faso	27.04.2009	Copenhagen, Denmark	Monique Ilboudo
Burundi		The Hague, Netherlands	
Cambodia	18.03.2011	Moscow, Russia	Vanna Thay
Canada	07.03.2012	Riga, Latvia	Jeanette Sautner
Chile		Copenhagen, Denmark	Mario Luis Silva (Chargé d´Affaires a. i.)
China	08.02.2012	Vilnius, Lithuania	Zengwen Liu
Colombia		Warsaw, Poland	Victoria Gonzalez Ariza (Ambassador agréé)
Costa Rica		Oslo, Norway	vacant
Cote d'Ivoire	19.06.2010	Moscow, Russia	Gnagno Philibert Fagnidi
Croatia	28.05.2009	Stockholm, Sweden	Vladimir Matek
Cyprus	20.05.2025	Warsaw, Poland	Nicos P. Nicolaou
Czech Republic	21.10.2009	Vilnius, Lithuania	Radek Pech
Denmark	17.01.2011	Vilnius, Lithuania	Jørgen Molde
Ecuador		Stockholm, Sweden	Mario Anibal Guerrero Murgueytio (Ambassador agréé)
Egypt	25.11.2009	Copenhagen, Denmark	Nabil Riad Habashi
El Salvador	14.12.2005	Stockholm, Sweden	Martin Alberto Rivera Gomez
Estonia	19.09.2012	Vilnius, Lithuania	Jana Vanaveski
Ethiopia		Brussels, Belgium	Kassu Yilala (Ambassador Agréé)
Finland	17.09.2008	Vilnius, Lithuania	Arja Makkonen
France	03.11.2011	Vilnius, Lithuania	Claire Lignières-Counathe
Gabon		Moscow, Russia	vacant
Georgia	14.10.2008	Vilnius, Lithuania	Salome Shapakidze
Germany	August 2023	Vilnius, Lithuania	Cornelius Zimmermann
Ghana	10.12.2011	Berlin, Germany	Paul King Aryene
Greece	03.02.2012	Vilnius, Lithuania	Michael-Efstratios Daratzikis
Guatemala	12.05.2009	Stockholm, Sweden	Fernando Molina-Girón
Guinea		Moscow, Russia	vacant
Honduras		Stockholm, Sweden	Hernan Antonio Bermudez Aguilar (Ambassador Agréé)
Holy See	20.05.2009	Vilnius, Lithuania	Luigi Bonazzi
Hungary	22.08.2011	Vilnius, Lithuania	Zoltan Pecze
Iceland	02.02.2018	Helsinki, Finland	Árni Þór Sigurðsson
India	15.12.2011	Warsaw, Poland	Monika Kapil Mohta
Indonesia	16.03.2012	Copenhagen, Denmark	Bomer Pasaribu
Iran	16.11.2010	Warsaw, Poland	Samadali Lakizadeh
Iraq	18.03.2011	Warsaw, Poland	Saad Jawad Kindeel
Ireland	17.09.2010	Vilnius, Lithuania	Philomena Murnaghan
Israel	2015	Riga, Latvia	Lironne Bar-Sade
Italy	13.03.2009	Vilnius, Lithuania	Stefano Maria Taliani De Marchio
Japan	07.03.2012	Vilnius, Lithuania	Kazuko Shiraishi
Jordan		The Hague, Netherlands	vacant
Kazakhstan	10.01.2023	Vilnius, Lithuania	Timur Urazaev
Kosovo	02.05.2012	Stockholm, Sweden	Lulzim Peci
Kuwait	08.09.2014	Berlin, Germany	Monther Bader Sulaiman Al-Eissa
Kyrgyzstan	06.08.2010	Minsk, Belarus	Erik Asanaliev
Laos		???	Khamvone Phanouvong (Ambassador agréé)
Latvia	17.09.2010	Vilnius, Lithuania	Solveiga Silkalna
Lebanon		Warsaw, Poland	Hatem Nasrallah (Chargé d'Affaires a.i.)
Libya	11.04.2010	Rome, Italy	Abdulhafed Gaddur
Luxembourg	25.02.2011	Warsaw, Poland	Conrad Aloyse Marie Bruch
Malawi		Berlin, Germany	Isaac Chikwekwere Lamba (Ambassador agréé)
Malaysia		Warsaw, Poland	vacant
Mali		Berlin, Germany	vacant
Malta	27.04.2009	Valletta, Malta	Laurence Grech
Mauritania		Moscow, Russia	Boulah Ould Mogyeye (Ambassador agréé)
Mexico	19.09.2012	Stockholm, Sweden	Jorge Lomonaco Tonda
Moldova	17.08.2010	Vilnius, Lithuania	Igor Klipii
Mongolia	20.04.2009	Warsaw, Poland	Tumen Tegshjargal (Chargé d'Affaires a.i.)
Montenegro		Warsaw, Poland	Ivan Leković (Ambassador agréé)
Morocco	20.04.2009	Copenhagen, Denmark	Raja Ghannam
Namibia		Stockholm, Sweden	Daniel Rudolph Smith (Ambassador agréé)
Nepal		Moscow, Russia	vacant
Netherlands	29.11.2011	Vilnius, Lithuania	Kornelis Willem Spaans
New Zealand		Berlin, Germany	Peter Howard Rider (Ambassador agréé)
Nicaragua		Helsinki, Finland	Ricardo José Alvarado Noguera (Ambassador agréé)
Nigeria		Kyiv, Ukraine	Fredrick O. Egbuedike (Chargé d'Affaires a.i.)
North Korea	10.11.2008	Stockholm, Sweden	Hui Chol Ri
North Macedonia	06.10.2010	Warsaw, Poland	Fatmir Xheladini
Norway	02.02.2014	Vilnius, Lithuania	Dag Malmer Halvorsen
Oman	19.06.2010	London, UK	Abdulaziz bin Andullah bin Zahir Al Hinai
Pakistan	05.07.2007	Copenhagen, Denmark	Fauzia Mufti Abbas
Panama		Warsaw, Poland	Yessenia Chala (Chargé d'Affaires a.i.)
Peru	04.11.2010	Helsinki, Finland	Pablo Hugo Portugal Rodriguez
Philippines	04.07.2007	Stockholm, Sweden	Maria Zeneida Angara Collinson
Poland	03.04.2005	Vilnius, Lithuania	Janusz Skolimowski
Portugal	26.06.2012	Vilnius, Lithuania	Joao Pedro de Almeida da Silveira Carvalho
Qatar	13.05.2010	Berlin, Germany	Abdulrahman Mohamed Al-Khulaifi
Romania		Vilnius, Lithuania	Cosmin-George Dinescu
Russia	08.07.2008	Vilnius, Lithuania	Vladimir Chkhikvadze
San Marino	23.02.2007	City of San Marino, San Marino	Katia Massari
Saudi Arabia	30.11.2009	Copenhagen, Denmark	Abdul Rahman Saad Al Hadlg
Serbia	15.03.2010	Warsaw, Poland	Radojko Bogojević
Slovakia	11.09.2009	Riga, Latvia	Dušan Krištofik
Slovenia	27.04.2009	Copenhagen, Denmark	Bogdan Benko
South Africa	06.10.2010	Copenhagen, Denmark	Samkelisiwe Isabel Mhlanga
South Korea	17.06.2011	Warsaw, Poland	Dongseok Kwon (Chargé d'Affaires a.i.)
Sovereign Military Order of Malta	21.03.2012	Vilnius, Lithuania	Christian von Mauchenheim
Spain	14.04.2011	Vilnius, Lithuania	Miguel Arias Estevez
Sri Lanka	23.04.2012	Stockholm, Sweden	Oshadhi Jagath Kumara Alahapperuma
Sweden	2023	Vilnius, Lithuania	Lars Wahlund
Switzerland		Riga, Latvia	Urs Daniel Bühler (Chargé d´Affaires a. i.)
Syria	09.06.2009	Minsk, Belarus	Wajih Ibrahim (Chargé d´Affaires a. i.)
Tajikistan	30.11.2011	Minsk, Belarus	Kozidavlat Koimdodov
Tanzania	19.04.2011	Täby, Sweden	Muhammed Mwinyi Mzale
Thailand	22.08.2011	Copenhagen, Denmark	Piyawat Niyomrerks
Tunisia		Warsaw, Poland	Nadra Rais Drije (Ambassador agréé); Nabih el Abed (Chargé d´Affaires a. i.)
Turkey	02.07.2012	Vilnius, Lithuania	Akin Algan
Turkmenistan		Minsk, Belarus	vacant
Ukraine	02.06.2011	Vilnius, Lithuania	Valerii Zhovtenko
United Arab Emirates	16.11.2010	Berlin, Germany	Mohammed Ahmad Al Mahmood
United Kingdom	28.06.2011	Vilnius, Lithuania	Brian Olley
United States	26.01.2024	Vilnius, Lithuania	Kara C. McDonald
Uruguay		Warsaw, Poland	Julio Giambruno (Ambassador agréé)
Uzbekistan	04.02.2003	Riga, Latvia	Kobiljon Nazarov
Venezuela		Helsinki, Finland	Ernesto Navazio Mossucca (Chargé d´Affaires a. i.)
Vietnam	26.07.2010	Warsaw, Poland	Hoang Nguyen
Zambia		Stockholm, Sweden	Joe Mwale (Chargé d´Affaires a. i.)

== See also ==
- Foreign relations of Lithuania
- List of diplomatic missions of Lithuania
- List of diplomatic missions in Lithuania
