= Evaldas Pašilis =

Former Prosecutor General of Lithuania

7th Prosecutor General of Lithuania
- In office 29 December 2015 – 29 December 2020
- Appointed by: Dalia Grybauskaitė
- Preceded by: Darius Raulušaitis (Acting)
- Succeeded by: Nida Grunskienė

Judge of Ukmergė District Court
- In office 2000 – 29 December 2015

Personal details
- Born: 13 October 1973 (age 52) Telšiai District, Lithuania
- Education: Vilnius University
- Occupation: Judge, jurist

Evaldas Pašilis (Lithuanian: [ˈæː.vɐl̪.d̪ɐs̪ pɐˈʃɪ.lʲɪs̪]; born 13 October 1973) is a Lithuanian jurist and judge who served as the 6th Prosecutor General of Lithuania from 30 December 2015 until 14 January 2021. In 2020, he was nominated as Lithuania's candidate for a position as a judge at the European Union General Court, but he was not appointed.

== Education ==
In 1994, he graduated from the Lithuanian Police Academy, and in 1998, from Vilnius University.

== Career ==
- 1994–1997 Junior Inspector of the Ukmergė District Police Station.
- 1997–1999 Inspector of the Tax Police Department under the Ministry of Internal Affairs of the Republic of Lithuania.
- 1999–2000 Candidate for Judge at the Ukmergė District Court.
- 2000–2015 Judge of Ukmergė District Court.
- 2007–2012 Chairman of Ukmergė District Court.
- 2015-2020 Prosecutor General of Lithuania.

He is currently a judge at the Appeal Court of Lithuania.
