= Dignitary Protection Service of Lithuania =

Government Agency

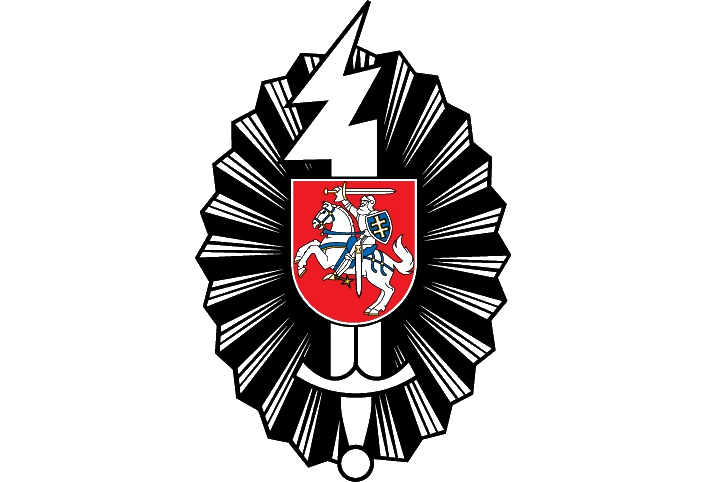
- Emblem of the Service

Agency overview
- Formed: 31 March 1990; 35 years ago
- Type: Government Service
- Jurisdiction: Government of Lithuania
- Headquarters: Vilnius, Lithuania
- Agency executive: Rymantas Mockevičius, Director
- Website: https://vat.lt/

The Dignitary Protection Service of Lithuania or VAT (Vadovybės apsaugos tarnyba) is a Lithuanian state institution responsible for protecting designated individuals and objects. The protected individuals include the President, the Speaker of the Seimas, the Prime Minister and their family members, official state guests, the Prosecutor General, and Lithuanian diplomatic representatives, while the protected objects comprise the buildings and grounds of the Seimas, the Government, the Presidential Palace, and Lithuania's diplomatic missions.

== Functions ==
Within the territory of the Republic of Lithuania, the service organizes and carries out the protection of designated individuals, coordinates the actions of the Ministry of the Interior and other institutions involved in ensuring the safety of protected persons and sites, and is responsible for their security within the limits of its competence.

Abroad, it ensures only the physical protection of state leadership, in accordance with the principles established by international legal instruments.

In line with laws and the scope defined by the Government of the Republic of Lithuania, it conducts operational activities necessary to fulfill its assigned tasks.

The service establishes and enforces special security regimes at protected sites.

It regulates access to protected locations by individuals lawfully carrying firearms, firearm parts, or ammunition, providing temporary secure storage for such items during their stay, as per procedures set by the Department Director.

In accordance with legal regulations and its jurisdiction, it carries out preventive measures against terrorist acts targeting protected individuals and sites.

It prepares draft legislation within its area of competence.

The service also collects, compiles, analyzes, and summarizes information relevant to its tasks and responsibilities.

== Directors ==
- 1990–1993 – Artūras Skučas
- 1993–1999 – Andrius Pečkys
- 1999–2013 – Raimundas Kairys
- Since 2013 – Rymantas Mockevičius
