= Irena Segalovičienė =

Auditor General of Lithuania

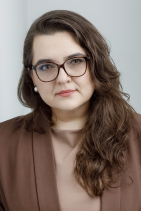
- Segalovičienė in 2025

Auditor General of Lithuania
- Incumbent
- Assumed office 8 May 2025
- President: Gitanas Nausėda
- Prime Minister: Gintautas Paluckas; Inga Ruginienė
- Speaker: Saulius Skvernelis; Juozas Olekas
- Preceded by: Mindaugas Macijauskas

Chief Adviser to the President
- In office 15 September 2021 – 8 May 2025
- President: Gitanas Nausėda
- Preceded by: Simonas Krėpšta
- Succeeded by: Vaidas Augustinavičius

Chancellor of the Ministry of Social Security and Labour
- Acting; 2018–2019

Personal details
- Born: 1981 (age 44–45) Šiauliai, Lithuania
- Education: Kaunas University of Technology

Irena Segalovičienė (Lithuanian: [/iˈrɛnɐ sɛɡəlɔˈvit͡ʃjɛnʲɛ/]; born 1981) is a Lithuanian public servant and politician who has served as the Auditor General of Lithuania since 8 May 2025. She was previously the chief advisor to President Gitanas Nausėda on economic and social policy matters from 2019 to 2025, and earlier held positions in the Ministry of Social Security and Labour, the Kaunas city municipality, and Kaunas University of Technology.

== Early life ==
Segalovičienė was born in 1981.

She studied at the Kaunas University of Technology (KTU), where she obtained a master's degree in public administration. She also undertook internships and professional training in the United Kingdom and Germany.

== Career ==
=== Early career ===
Segalovičienė began her career in academia and public administration. She lectured at the KTU Institute of Public Policy and Administration.

=== Government service ===
From 2018 until 2019, she headed the Strategic Decisions Support Group at the Ministry of Social Security and Labour.

In 2019, President Gitanas Nausėda appointed her as Chief Advisor on Economic and Social Policy and head of the Presidential group for economic and social strategy.

=== Auditor General of Lithuania ===
In April 2025, President Nausėda nominated Segalovičienė to become the Auditor General of Lithuania. Her candidacy was debated in the Seimas, with some opposition members raising questions about the required “cooling-off” period for political appointees. Segalovičienė argued that her prior advisory role did not compromise the independence of the office.

On 6 May 2025, the Seimas confirmed her appointment in a secret ballot, with 69 votes in favour, 25 against, 7 abstentions, and 4 invalid ballots. She formally assumed office on 8 May 2025, succeeding Mindaugas Macijauskas.
