= Gabrielė Juodkaitė-Granskienė =

Lithuanian lawyer and legal scholar

5th Chairwoman of the Criminal Division of the Supreme Court of Lithuania
- Incumbent
- Assumed office 11 November 2022
- President: Gitanas Nausėda
- Prime Minister: Ingrida Šimonytė; Gintautas Paluckas
- Preceded by: Aurelius Gutauskas

Judge of the Supreme Court of Lithuania
- Incumbent
- Assumed office October 2017

Acting President of the Supreme Court of Lithuania
- In office 14 November 2022 – 27 March 2023
- Preceded by: Sigita Rudėnaitė (acting)
- Succeeded by: Danguolė Bublienė

Personal details
- Born: 1973 (age 52–53) Lithuania
- Education: Vilnius University
- Occupation: Lawyer

Gabrielė Juodkaitė-Granskienė (Lithuanian: [ɡɐˈbrʲɪɛːlʲeː ˈjuo̯dˌkɐɪ̯tʲeː ˈɡrɐnsʲkʲɛːnʲeː]; born 1973) is a Lithuanian lawyer and legal scholar. Since 2017, she serves as a judge of the Supreme Court of Lithuania.

She has served as the Director at the Forensic Science Centre of Lithuania. Since 2022, she also serves as the Chairwoman of the Criminal Division of the Supreme Court of Lithuania.

== Education ==
Juodkaitė-Granskienė graduated with a law degree from Vilnius University in 1996 and earned her PhD in Law from the same institution in 2003. She has also served as an associate professor at the Faculty of Law at Vilnius University since 1997.

== Career ==
Juodkaitė-Granskienė has held several prominent positions throughout her career. She served as the Director of the Forensic Science Centre of Lithuania, where she was responsible for overseeing the country's forensic research. In 2017, she was appointed as a judge of the Supreme Court of Lithuania, where she has contributed her expertise in criminal law. Since 11 November 2022, she has served as the Chairwoman of the Criminal Cases Division of the Supreme Court of Lithuania. Additionally, she has been an associate professor at the Faculty of Law at Vilnius University since 1997, where she has shared her knowledge of law with students.
