= National Audit Office of Lithuania =

Supreme audit institution of Lithuania

National Audit Office
- Valstybės Kontrolė

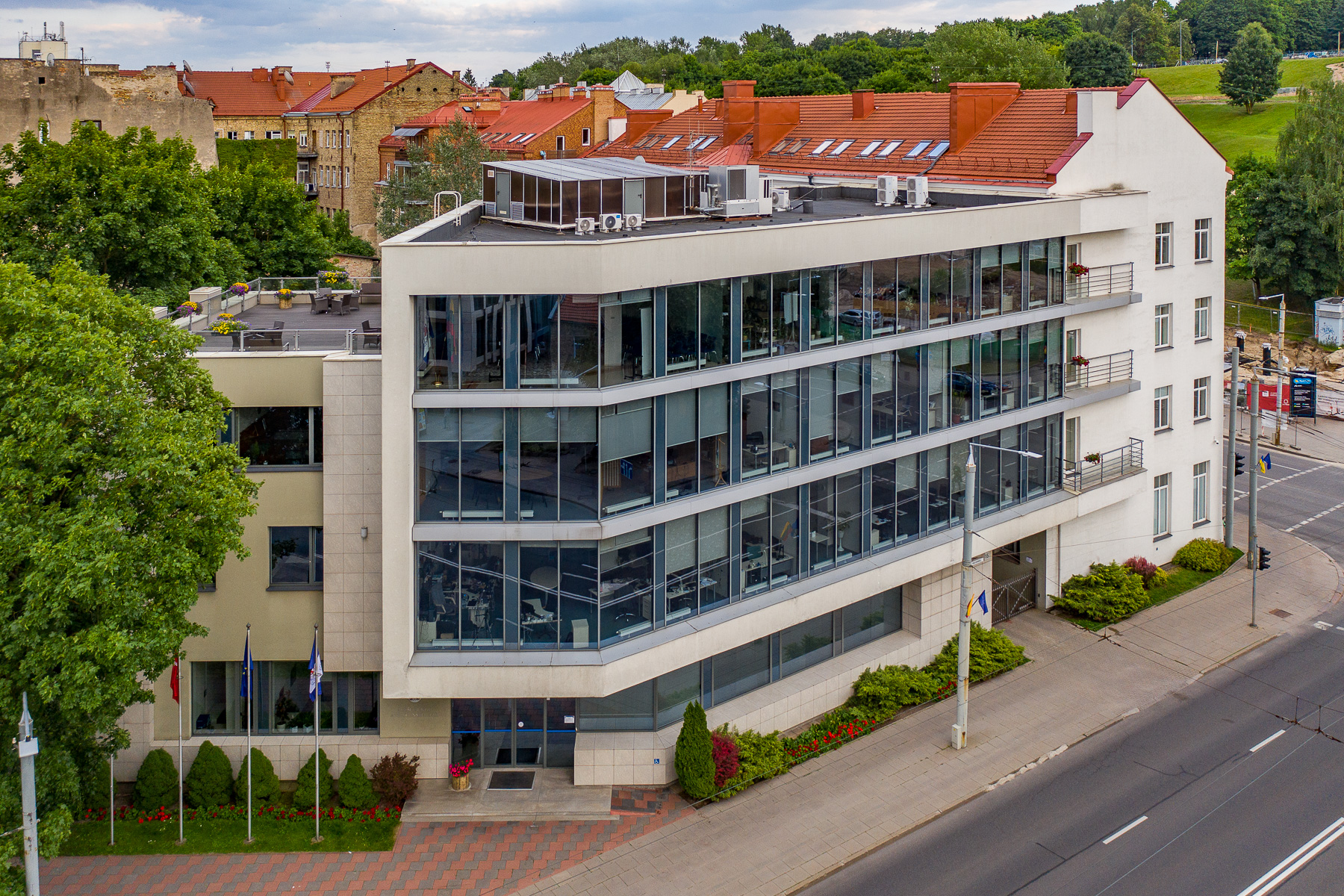
- Headquarters

Agency overview
- Formed: 16 January 1919
- Jurisdiction: Government of Lithuania
- Headquarters: Pamėnkalnio g. 27, 01113, Vilnius
- Agency executive: Auditor General, Irena Segalovičienė
- Website: valstybeskontrole.lt

National Audit Office of Lithuania (Lithuanian: Lietuvos Respublikos Valstybės kontrolė; literally, State Control) is the supreme audit institution in Lithuania, functioning as the independent auditor for the Parliament of Lithuania.

The National Audit Office is enshrined in the Chapter XII of the Constitution of Lithuania.

== History ==
The institution was established on 16 January 1919, as Lithuanian State Control Institution, when the first laws regulating the audit activities were adopted. The modern institution was restored on 5 April 1990.

National Audit Office of Lithuania is a member of the International Organization of Supreme Audit Institutions since 1992 and a member of the European Organization of Supreme Audit Institutions since 1993.

== Role ==
The primary objectives of the institution are:

- to examine whether the state finances, assets and other resources are used and managed lawfully and efficiently;
- provide recommendations and encourage more efficient and effective management and use of resources in the public sector.

The institution is regulated by the Law on National Audit Office 1995.

The Budget Policy Monitoring Department (BPMD) was established in 2015 to monitor Lithuania's compliance with the rules and targets in the European Economic and Monetary Union.

== Auditors general ==
Auditors general
| Name | From | To | Tenure |
|---|---|---|---|
| Vladas Stašinskas | 26 December 1918 | 16 January 1919 | 21 days |
| Kostas Daugirdas | 16 January 1919 | 23 February 1919 | 38 days |
| Justinas Zubrickas | 23 February 1919 | February 1924 | 4 years, 343 days |
| Vincas Karoblis | March 1924 | September 1925 | 1 year, 184 days |
| Zigmas Starkus | October 1925 | May 1926 | 212 days |
| Jonas Mašiotas | 1 August 1926 | 17 December 1926 | 138 days |
| Antanas Milčius | 17 December 1926 | 1 May 1928 | 1 year, 136 days |
| Vincas Matulaitis | 7 May 1928 | 9 June 1934 | 6 years, 33 days |
| Konstantinas Šakenis | 12 June 1934 | 15 June 1940 | 6 years, 3 days |
| Kazimieras Uoka | 21 June 1990 | 26 November 1992 | 2 years, 158 days |
| Vidas Kundrotas | 4 January 1993 | 23 September 1999 | 6 years, 262 days |
| Jonas Liaučius | 23 September 1999 | 4 February 2005 | 5 years, 134 days |
| Rasa Budbergytė | 4 February 2005 | 15 April 2010 | 5 years, 70 days |
| Giedrė Švedienė | 15 April 2010 | 14 April 2015 | 4 years, 364 days |
| Arūnas Dulkys | 15 April 2015 | 30 April 2020 | 5 years, 15 days |
| Mindaugas Macijauskas | 7 May 2020 | 8 May 2025 | 5 years, 1 day |
| Irena Segalovičienė | 8 May 2025 | | |

== See also ==
- European Court of Auditors
- Other "Supreme audit institutions"
