= Judicial Council of Lithuania =

Executive body of the judiciary

- Lietuvos Teisėjų Taryba
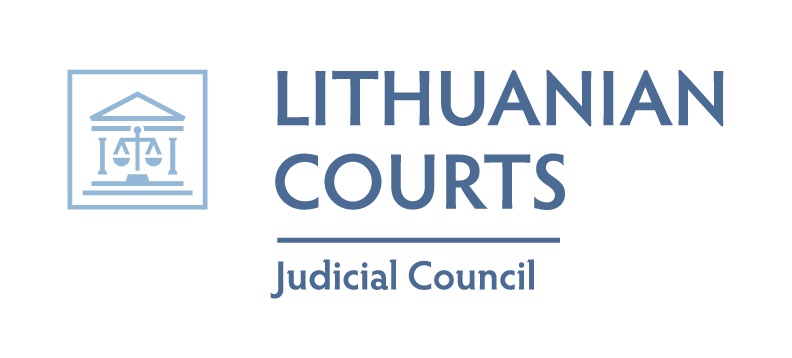
- Logo of the Judicial Council of Lithuania

Agency overview
- Formed: 1 July 2002
- Jurisdiction: Republic of Lithuania
- Headquarters: Vilnius, Lithuania
- Employees: 17
- Agency executive: Danguolė Bublienė, President
- Key document: Constitution of Lithuania
- Website: teismai.lt

Footnotes
- Every four years, a new Judicial Council is elected in Lithuania, with members chosen to serve a four-year term.

The Judicial Council of Lithuania (Lithuanian: Lietuvos Teisėjų Taryba) is the executive body of self-government of the judiciary, which ensures the independence of the courts and judges. It consists of 17 judges. The Council's term of office is four years, and judges may be elected for a maximum of two consecutive terms.

== Function ==
Judicial Council of Lithuania is entrusted with a broad range of responsibilities designed to safeguard the independence and efficiency of the judiciary. It elects key officers—the Chairman, Deputy Chairman, and Secretary—by secret ballot and adopts its Rules of procedure. In addition, it provides informed advice to the President on judicial appointments, promotions, transfers, removals, and the appointment and dismissal of court leaders, as well as on adjusting judicial staffing in courts.

The Council establishes an examination commission for judicial candidates, approves procedures for adding candidates to district court vacancies and the judicial promotion register, and forms both permanent and Ad hoc commissions. It oversees bodies such as the Judicial Ethics and Discipline Commission and the Judicial Court of Honour—electing and appointing their members by secret ballot, reviewing their reports, and proposing disciplinary actions against a judge. Moreover, it approves performance assessment frameworks, including complaint reviews, and forms a permanent commission to assess judicial activities.

In its administrative role, the Council approves court administration regulations, organizes judge training programs, and endorses model structures, position lists, and job descriptions for district and regional courts of Lithuania. It also reviews proposals for court investment programs and budgets—submitting them to the Government—monitors reports from the Lithuanian National Courts Administration, and publishes an annual review of court activities. Finally, it convenes regular and extraordinary general meetings of judges, cooperates with Lithuanian institutions on judicial autonomy, collaborates with international organizations, and may request necessary information from state institutions to resolve issues related to court operations and legislation.

== Composition ==
The Judicial Council of Lithuania is composed of the following members:

1. Ex officio members:
  - The President of the Supreme Court
  - The President of Court of Appeal of Lithuania
  - The President of the Supreme Administrative Court
2. Judges elected by the General Meeting of Judges:
  - Three judges from the Supreme Court, the Court of Appeal, and the Supreme Administrative Court.
  - One judge from each regional court.
  - One judge from all regional administrative courts.
  - One judge from all district courts within the jurisdiction of each regional court. The candidates are nominated and elected during the General Meeting of Judges by representatives from the relevant courts.

== President ==
President of the Judicial Council
- Teisėjų tarybos pirmininkas
- Incumbent; Danguolė Bublienė since 28 October 2024
- Judicial Council of Lithuania
- Style: Her Excellency
- Type: Judiciary
- Member of: Judicial Council
- Reports to: President; Judicial Council
- Appointer: Secret Ballot
- Term length: Two years, renewable once consecutively
- Constituting instrument: Constitution of Lithuania
- Formation: 1 July 2002; 24 years ago
- First holder: Gintaras Kryževičius
- Deputy: Vice President

The President of the Judicial Council (Lithuanian: Teisėjų tarybos pirmininkas) is the head of the council. The President oversees the Council's work, represents the judiciary in official matters, and plays a key role in judicial appointments, promotions, and disciplinary actions. The position is elected by the members of the Council for a two-year term. The current President is Danguolė Bublienė, who assumed office on 28 October 2024, following her election via secret ballot.

The President holds a pivotal role in overseeing the Council's operations and ensuring the independence of the judiciary. This position involves leading the Council's activities, representing the judiciary in official matters, and ensuring the effective functioning of the Council. The President is responsible for providing informed advice to the President of the Republic regarding the appointment, promotion, transfer, and removal of judges, as well as the appointment and removal of court leaders such as Chairmen and Deputy Chairmen. Additionally, the President oversees the approval of the Rules of Procedure for the Judicial Council and supervises the administration and training of judges. The President also oversees the activities of the Judicial Ethics and Discipline Commission, including the election of its members and approval of its regulations. Furthermore, the President approves regulations related to court administration, training programs, and annual plans for improving qualifications.

The President is elected by the Council's members for a two-year term. The election is conducted through a secret ballot, ensuring a transparent and democratic selection process. This procedure is outlined in the Council's Rules of Procedure, which are approved by the Council itself.
