= Jonas Liaučius =

Lithuanian politician

Jonas Liaučius (born 15 January 1947) is a Lithuanian politician. In 1990 he was among those who signed the Act of the Re-Establishment of the State of Lithuania.
