= President of the Supreme Administrative Court of Lithuania =

Chief justice in Lithuania

- Lietuvos Vyriausiojo Administracinio Teismo Pirmininkas
- Emblem of the Supreme Administrative Court of Lithuania

- Coat of Arms of Lithuania
- Incumbent; Skirgailė Žalimienė since 26 July 2022
- Supreme Administrative Court of Lithuania
- Style: Her Excellency
- Type: Head of the Court
- Status: Chief Justice
- Member of: Justices of the Court
- Appointer: President of Lithuania (With the consent of Seimas)
- Term length: Six years, renewable
- Constituting instrument: Constitution of Lithuania
- Formation: 1 January 2001
- Deputy: Vice President
- Website: https://www.lvat.lt/en

The President of the Supreme Administrative Court of Lithuania (Lithuanian: Lietuvos Vyriausiojo Administracinio Teismo Pirmininkas) is the chief justice of the Supreme Administrative Court of Lithuania, responsible for overseeing administrative justice, ensuring the uniform interpretation and application of administrative law, and managing the court’s operations. The President represents the court in official matters and may participate in shaping judicial policy. Skirgailė Žalimienė has held the position of President since 26 July 2022.

== Appointment ==
According to the Constitution of the Republic of Lithuania, the President of the Supreme Administrative Court is appointed by the Seimas upon the submission of the President of the Republic.

== Duties ==
The President of the Supreme Administrative Court of Lithuania holds several key responsibilities. They oversee the court's operations, ensuring effective functioning and adherence to legal standards. In this capacity, the President manages administrative tasks, presides over significant legal cases, and represents the court in national and international matters. A crucial aspect of the role involves developing and maintaining uniform case law within the administrative courts by interpreting and applying laws and other legal acts consistently. Additionally, the President may participate in shaping judicial policy and collaborates with other judicial institutions to foster relationships and uphold the integrity of the judiciary.
