= Mindaugas Macijauskas =

Former Auditor General of Lithuania

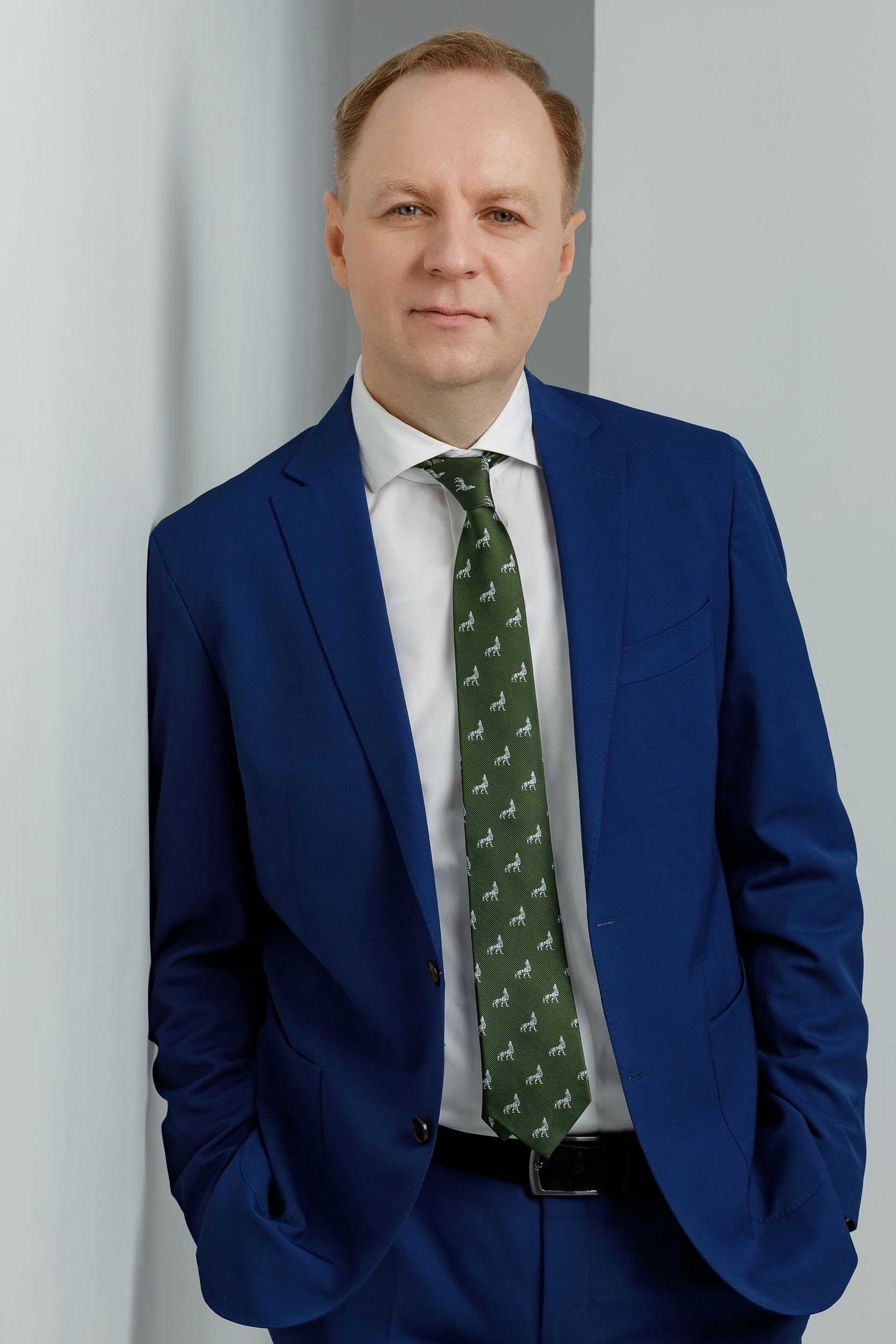
- Official portrait, 2020

Auditor General of Lithuania
- In office 7 May 2020 – 6 May 2025
- President: Gitanas Nausėda
- Prime Minister: Ingrida Šimonytė; Gintautas Paluckas
- Speaker: Viktorija Čmilytė-Nielsen; Saulius Skvernelis
- Preceded by: Arūnas Dulkys
- Succeeded by: Irena Segalovičienė

Personal details
- Born: 7 September 1977 (age 49) Kaunas, Lithuania
- Education: Mykolas Romeris University; Vilnius University

Mindaugas Macijauskas (Lithuanian: [/mʲɪnˈdɐʊɡɐs mɐt͡sɪˈjɐʊskɐs/]; born 5 September 1978) is a Lithuanian public servant and auditor who served as Auditor General of Lithuania from 7 May 2020 to 6 May 2025. During his tenure, he focused on modernizing the institution, introducing artificial intelligence and automating audit processes, significantly reducing audit completion times and increasing output while ensuring compliance with international standards.

== Education ==
He graduated with degrees in business administration and public administration.

== Career ==
Macijauskas began working at the National State Audit Office of Lithuania in 2002, gaining over 18 years of experience in audit and public finance management. From 2016, he also served as a member of the Audit Committee of the European Investment Bank, contributing to oversight and evaluation of financial operations. In June 2018, he was appointed Deputy State Controller, serving in leadership roles within the institution prior to his appointment as Auditor General.

On 7 May 2020, President Gitanas Nausėda nominated Macijauskas as Auditor General, and the Seimas approved his appointment. Macijauskas's term ended on 6 May 2025. Following the completion of his term, President Nausėda nominated Irena Segalovičienė as the new Auditor General.
