= Prosecutor General of Lithuania =

- Lietuvos Generalinis Prokuroras
- Emblem of the Prosecutor General's office of Lithuania

- Coat of Arms of Lithuania
- Incumbent; Nida Grunskienė since 14 January 2021
- General Prosecutor's office
- Type: Executive
- Status: Chief Officer
- Member of: Lithuanian Government, Lithuanian Bar Association, European Union Network of Prosecutors
- Appointer: President of Lithuania
- Term length: Five years, renewable
- Constituting instrument: Constitution of Lithuania
- Formation: 1990
- First holder: Artūras Paulauskas
- Salary: €8,800 per month
- Website: www.prokuraturos.lt

The Prosecutor General of Lithuania (Lithuanian: Lietuvos Generalinis Prokuroras) is the chief and head of the Prosecutor General's Office of Lithuania and is the highest-ranking official within the Lithuanian prosecutorial system. The current incumbent is Nida Grunskienė.

== Duties ==
The Prosecutor General of Lithuania holds a crucial position in the country's legal system, with several important responsibilities. One of the primary duties is overseeing criminal prosecutions and ensuring that they are carried out effectively and in compliance with the law. The Prosecutor General supervises investigations, especially those of national importance, and directs prosecutors on how cases should be handled. This role is central to ensuring that justice is served and that legal proceedings are fair and transparent.

In addition to this, the Prosecutor General represents the state in legal matters, particularly in cases involving significant crimes such as organized crime, terrorism, and corruption. They are the chief legal representative of the state in criminal cases, ensuring that the interests of society and the state are protected. This responsibility also includes addressing cases of high public concern, where the outcomes can have a wide-reaching impact.

The Prosecutor General also supervises the work of lower-ranking prosecutors, providing guidance and ensuring consistency in the application of the law throughout Lithuania. They play an essential role in maintaining the integrity and effectiveness of the entire prosecutorial system, ensuring that prosecutors at every level adhere to the same legal standards.

Another critical aspect of the role involves representing Lithuania in international legal matters. This includes coordinating with foreign law enforcement bodies on cross-border criminal cases, extradition requests, and other legal issues that involve international cooperation. The Prosecutor General often works within various international legal frameworks, participating in organizations like the European Union Network of Prosecutors.

Beyond these functions, the Prosecutor General advises the government, including the President and the Seimas (Lithuanian Parliament), on legal matters, particularly those related to criminal justice and law enforcement. They are also involved in the development and reform of laws and policies related to the justice system and criminal law, ensuring that Lithuania's legal frameworks evolve in response to societal needs and international standards.

Throughout all of these duties, the Prosecutor General must maintain the independence and impartiality of the prosecution service. They ensure that prosecutors operate without political interference, upholding justice and the rule of law. The position is vital to the functioning of the Lithuanian justice system, with the Prosecutor General being central to ensuring that legal proceedings are fair, just, and in the best interest of society.

== List of prosecutor generals ==
Denotes service as acting prosecutors general before appointment or after resignation

| No. | Portrait | Name | Took office | Left office | President(s) |
|---|---|---|---|---|---|
| 1 | | Artūras Paulauskas | March 22, 1990 | January 1, 1995 | Algirdas Brazauskas (1993–1998) |
| 2 | | Vladimiras Nikitinas | January 2, 1995 | February 25, 1997 | Algirdas Brazauskas (1993–1998) |
| 3 | | Kazys Pėdnyčia | April 3, 1997 | December 13, 2000 | Algirdas Brazauskas (1993–1998) |
| 3 | | Kazys Pėdnyčia | April 3, 1997 | December 13, 2000 | Valdas Adamkus (1998–2003) |
| 4 | | Antanas Klimavičius | December 13, 2000 | July 7, 2005 | Valdas Adamkus (1998–2003) |
| 4 | | Antanas Klimavičius | December 13, 2000 | July 7, 2005 | Rolandas Paksas (2003–2004) |
| 4 | | Antanas Klimavičius | December 13, 2000 | July 7, 2005 | Valdas Adamkus (2004–2009) |
| 5 | | Algimantas Valantinas | November 24, 2005 | February 23, 2010 | Valdas Adamkus (2004–2009) |
| 5 | | Algimantas Valantinas | November 24, 2005 | February 23, 2010 | Dalia Grybauskaitė (2009–2019) |
| 6 | | Darius Valys | June 3, 2010 | June 15, 2015 | Dalia Grybauskaitė (2009–2019) |
| – | | Darius Raulušaitis | June 15, 2015 | December 30, 2015 | Dalia Grybauskaitė (2009–2019) |
| 7 | | Evaldas Pašilis | December 30, 2015 | December 30, 2020 | Dalia Grybauskaitė (2009–2019) |
| 7 | | Evaldas Pašilis | December 30, 2015 | December 30, 2020 | Gitanas Nausėda (2019– ) |
| 8 | | Nida Grunskienė | January 14, 2021 | Incumbent | Gitanas Nausėda (2019– ) |
