= Jana Vanaveski =

Estonian diplomat

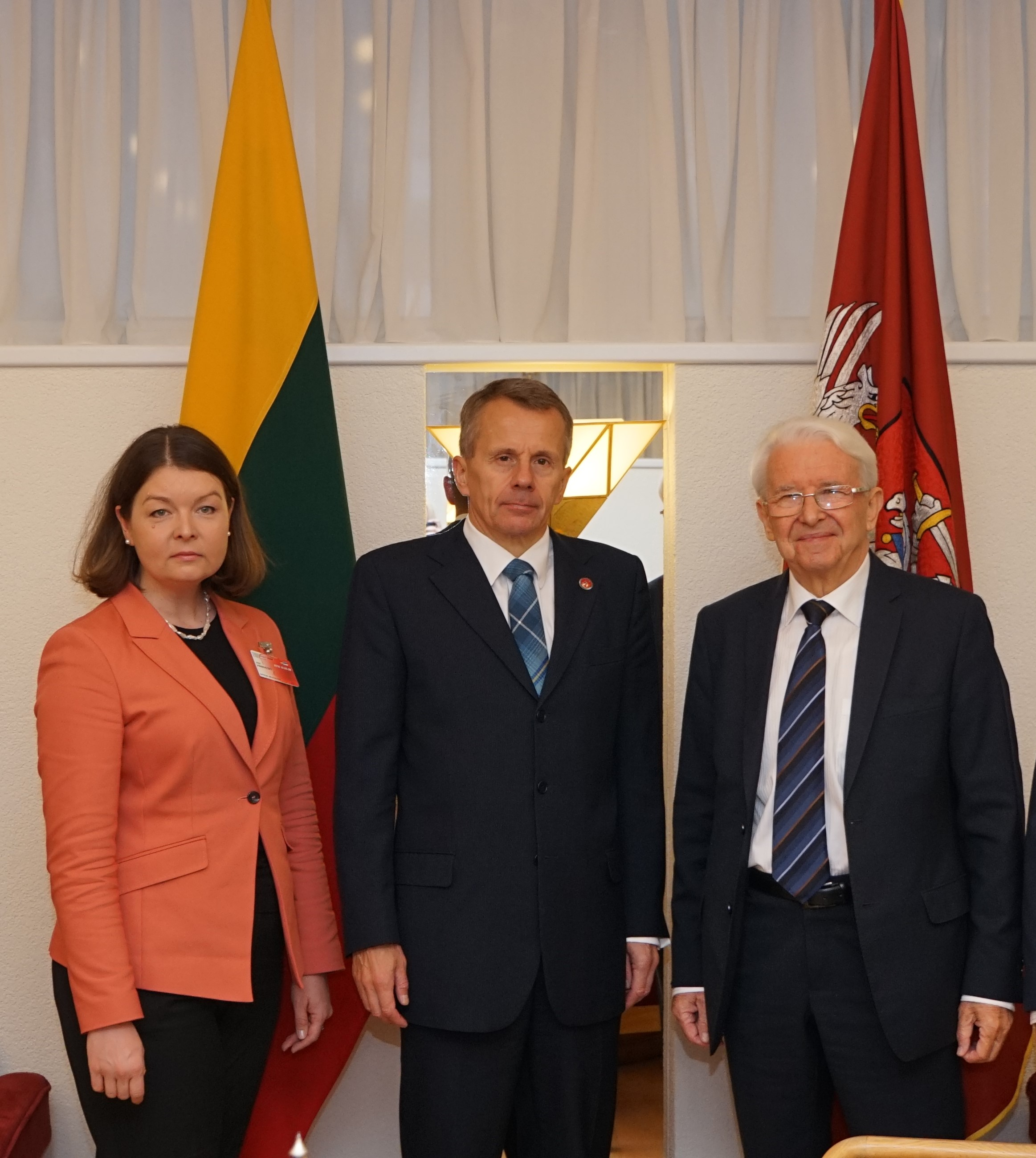
Jana Vanaveski with Jürgen Ligi and Benediktas Juodka

Jana Vanaveski (born on 4 September 1971 in Tallinn) is an Estonian diplomat.

In 1993 she graduated from Tallinn University of Technology. In 1995 she graduated from the School of International Relationships in Amsterdam (Estonian: Amsterdami Rahvusvaheliste Suhete Kool).

Since 1993 she has been working for the Estonian Foreign Ministry. Since 2016 to 2020 she was Ambassador of Estonia to Lithuania.

Awards:

- 2013: Lithuanian order of precedence.
