= Danguolė Bublienė =

Lithuanian judge (born 1972)

Her Excellency Danguolė Bublienė

3rd President of the Supreme Court of Lithuania
- Incumbent
- Assumed office 27 March 2023
- President: Gitanas Nausėda
- Prime Minister: Ingrida Šimonytė; Gintautas Paluckas; Inga Ruginienė
- Chancellor: Erika Klėgerė
- Preceded by: Gabriele Juodkaitė-Granskienė (acting)

President of the Judicial Council of Lithuania
- Incumbent
- Assumed office 28 October 2024
- President: Gitanas Nausėda
- Prime Minister: Ingrida Šimonytė; Gintautas Paluckas; Inga Ruginienė
- Deputy: Nerijus Meilutis; Ramūnas Gadliauskas
- Preceded by: Gabriele Juodkaitė-Granskienė (acting)

Judge of the Supreme Court of Lithuania
- Incumbent
- Assumed office November 2017
- President: Dalia Grybauskaitė; Gitanas Nausėda
- Prime Minister: Ingrida Šimonytė; Gintautas Paluckas; Inga Ruginienė

Secretary of the Ministry of Education, Science and Sports
- In office 2005–2007
- Minister: Remigijus Motuzas; Roma Žakaitienė

Personal details
- Born: 7 January 1972 (age 54) Lithuania
- Education: Vilnius University
- Occupation: Jurist, President of the Supreme Court of Lithuania
- Voice of Danguolė Bublienė

Dr. Danguolė Bublienė is a Lithuanian lawyer and judge who is currently serving as the President of the Supreme Court of Lithuania. She is the first woman to hold this position in the history of the Lithuanian judiciary. Her career spans various legal roles, where she has earned recognition for her expertise in civil law and her commitment to ensuring justice.

On the 28th of October, the first meeting of the new Judicial Council took place, during which the new leadership of the Judicial Council was elected. Bublienė, President of the Supreme Court of Lithuania, was unanimously elected President of the Judicial Council by secret ballot.

== Career ==
From 1994 to 1998, she worked at the Ministry of Justice in the Legislation Department, holding roles such as specialist, senior specialist, and expert. Her expertise led her to pursue doctoral studies at Vilnius University, where she obtained a Ph.D. in social sciences in 2007. From 2017 she is a Judge of the Supreme Court of Lithuania and President since 27 March 2023.
