= President of the Supreme Court of Lithuania =

- Lietuvos Aukščiausiojo Teismo Pirmininkas
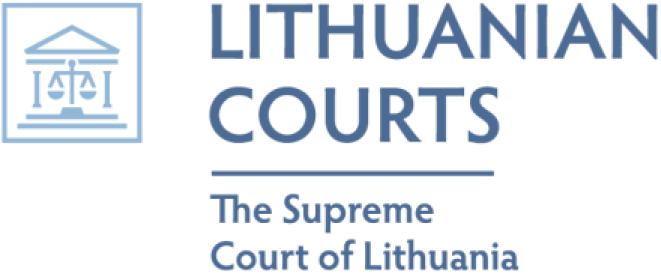
- Emblem of the Supreme Court of Lithuania

- Flag of the Republic of Lithuania
- Incumbent; Danguolė Bublienė since 27 March 2023
- Style: Her Excellency
- Type: Head of the Supreme Court of Lithuania
- Status: Chief Justice
- Member of: Justices of the Supreme Court of Lithuania
- Appointer: President (With the consent of Seimas)
- Term length: Five years, no limit
- Constituting instrument: Constitution of Lithuania
- Formation: 1992
- First holder: Vytautas Greičius
- Website: https://www.lat.lt

The President of the Supreme Court of Lithuania (Lithuanian: Lietuvos Aukščiausiojo Teismo Pirmininkas) is the President or chief justice of the Supreme Court of Lithuania. The president is regarded as one of two equivalent heads of judicial branch in Government of Lithuania. Another head is the president of the Constitutional Court of Lithuania. The current President of the Supreme Court of Lithuania is Incumbent Danguolė Bublienė.

== Appointment ==
The President of the Supreme Court of Lithuania is appointed by the President of Lithuania with the consent of Seimas. By the Constitution of Lithuania, the President of the Supreme Court of Lithuania serves a term of five years, with the possibility of reappointment for a second term.

== Duties ==
The President of the Supreme Court of Lithuania is responsible for overseeing the operations of the Court, ensuring that it functions effectively and in accordance with the law. This role includes managing the court's administrative tasks, presiding over important legal cases, and representing the court in national and international matters. The President also plays a key role in ensuring consistency within the judicial system by supervising the activities of lower courts and promoting transparency through the publication of rulings. Through these duties, the President helps uphold the rule of law and maintain the independence and integrity of Lithuania's judiciary.
