= Nida Grunskienė =

Prosecutor General of Lithuania

8th Prosecutor General of the Republic of Lithuania
- Incumbent
- Assumed office 14 January 2021
- President: Gitanas Nausėda
- Prime Minister: Ingrida Šimonytė; Gintautas Paluckas; Inga Ruginienė
- Deputy: Saulius Verseckas; Gintas Ivanauskas
- Preceded by: Evaldas Pašilis

Personal details
- Born: 21 May 1969 (age 57) Kupiškis District
- Citizenship: Lithuania
- Education: Vilnius University
- Occupation: Jurist, Prosecutor General

Nida Grunskienė (Lithuanian: [/ˈnɪdɐ ˈɡrʊnˌskʲɛːnʲɛ/]; born 21 May 1969) is a Lithuanian jurist and legal expert who has been serving as the Prosecutor General of Lithuania since 14 January 2021. She also served as the Chief Prosecutor of the Panevėžys Regional Prosecutor's Office from 2013 to 2021, where she gained extensive experience in handling criminal cases, particularly in the areas of organized crime and corruption.

Nida graduated from Vilnius University in 1995 with a law degree. She started her career in 1992 at the District Prosecutor's Office of Kupiškis Region. There, she worked as an intern, investigator, and prosecutor. This early experience helped her build the skills needed for her later roles in the Lithuanian legal system, where she focused on handling serious crimes like organized crime and corruption.

She is currently the Prosecutor General of Lithuania. She was appointed for a second term that will expire on the 14 January 2031.

== Education ==
Nida Grunskienė graduated from the Faculty of Law at Vilnius University in 1995, earning the qualification of a lawyer. In May 2023, she awarded prizes to seven law students from Mykolas Romeris University for their outstanding prosecutor's closing speeches in court. In July 2023, during a ceremony at Vilnius University, she presented the award for the best final master's thesis on criminal justice to Rugilė Hokušaitė.

== Career ==
She began her career in 1992 at the District Prosecutor's Office of Kupiškis Region, where she worked as an intern, investigator, and prosecutor. Over the years, she advanced through various positions within the Lithuanian prosecutorial system. She served as a prosecutor at the Panevėžys Regional Prosecutor's Office and later as the Deputy Chief Prosecutor and Chief Prosecutor of the office from 2013 to 2021. In 2021, Grunskienė was appointed as the Prosecutor General of Lithuania, where she oversees the entire prosecutorial system and leads efforts to combat serious crimes. In her career, she has gained extensive experience in criminal law and played a key role in strengthening Lithuania's legal framework.

== Personal life ==
In addition to her native Lithuanian, Grunskienė also speaks English and Russian.
