= President of the Court of Appeal of Lithuania =

Office of the President of the Court of Appeal of Lithuania

- Lietuvos Respublikos Apeliacinio Teismo Pirmininkas
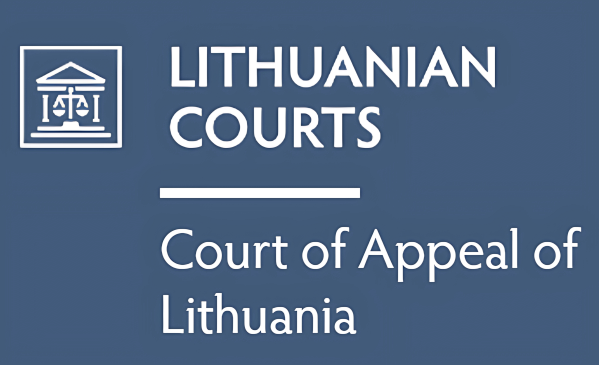
- Emblem of the Court of Appeal of Lithuania

- Flag of the Republic of Lithuania
- Incumbent; Vacant since 22 June 2026
- Court of Appeal
- Style: His Excellency
- Type: Head of the Court
- Status: Chief Justice
- Member of: Justices of the Appeal Court of Lithuania
- Appointer: President (With the consent of Seimas)
- Term length: Five years, renewable
- Constituting instrument: Constitution of Lithuania
- Inaugural holder: Jonas Prapiestis
- Formation: 1994
- Salary: €4163 (per month) €49,960 (annually)
- Website: www.apeliacinis.lt

The President of the Court of Appeal of Lithuania (Lithuanian: Lietuvos Apeliacinio Teismo Pirmininkas) is the chief justice of the Appeal Court. Serving as the presiding judge of a full bench composed of multiple judges, the president represents the Court of Appeal of Lithuania.

== Appointment ==
The President of the Appeal Court of Lithuania is appointed by the President of Lithuania with the consent of Seimas. By the Constitution of Lithuania, the President of the Appeal Court of Lithuania serves a term of five years, with the possibility of reappointment for a second term.

== Duties ==
The President of the Court of Appeal of Lithuania has crucial responsibilities in managing the operations of the court, ensuring that cases are handled efficiently and in a timely manner. They oversee the court’s internal processes, including the distribution of cases to judges and ensuring the workload is balanced. Additionally, they are tasked with managing administrative matters such as staffing and budgeting, all while maintaining the smooth functioning of the court.

In terms of judicial independence, the President ensures that the court operates free from external influences, upholding the principles of fairness and impartiality. The President also represents the Court of Appeal in interactions with other judicial bodies, government institutions, and international organizations. As the spokesperson for the court, they handle media inquiries and participate in discussions with the President of Lithuania, the Seimas, and other relevant authorities.

Beyond administrative and representational roles, the President is involved in the development and implementation of judicial reforms to enhance the overall legal system in Lithuania.
