= Supreme Administrative Court of Lithuania =

- Lietuvos vyriausiasis administracinis teismas
- Interactive map of Supreme Administrative Court of Lithuania
- 54.6884947°N 25.2866839°E
- Established: 1 January 2001
- Jurisdiction: Republic of Lithuania
- Location: Žygimantų Street 2, Vilnius, Lithuania
- Coordinates: 54.6884947°N 25.2866839°E
- Authorised by: Constitution of Lithuania
- Website: lvat.lt

President
- Currently: Skirgailė Žalimienė

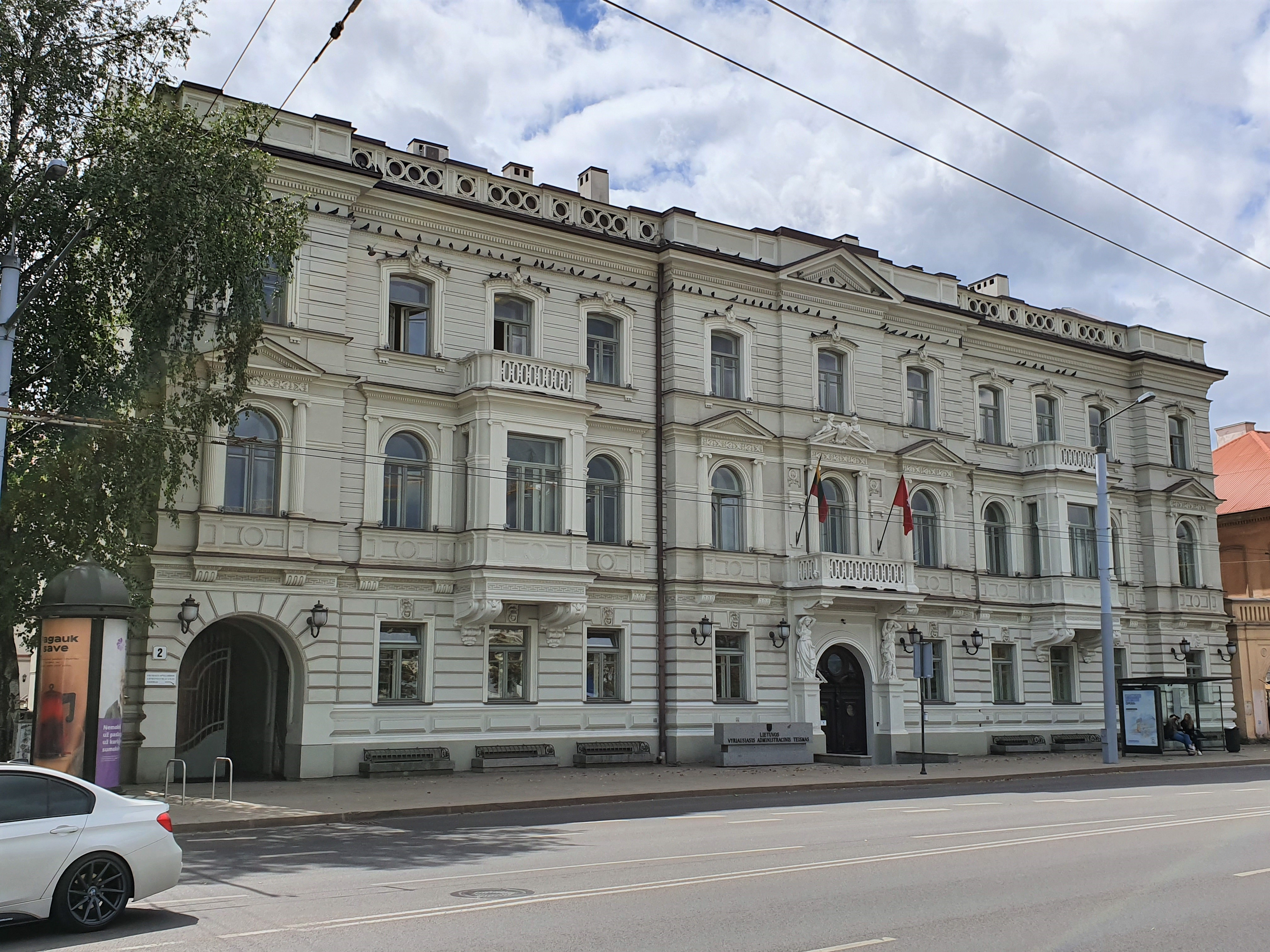
Supreme Administrative Court of Lithuania in Vilnius

The Supreme Administrative Court of Lithuania (Lithuanian: Lietuvos vyriausiasis administracinis teismas) was formed and started its activities from 1 January 2001, following the amendment of Law on the Establishment of Administrative Courts of 19 September 2000.

== Composition ==
The Supreme Administrative Court is composed of the President, the Vice-president and other justices. At present there are nineteen justices serving at the Court. Cases at the Supreme Administrative Court are heard by a chamber of three justices, an extended chamber of five or seven justices or a plenary session of the Supreme Administrative Court.

== Activities ==
The Supreme Administrative Court of Lithuania, as the supreme judicial institution in administrative cases, develops uniform case-law of administrative courts in interpreting and applying laws and other legal acts. Individuals, persons defending public interest and other persons, defending themselves against unlawful actions of state authorities (officials), usually first apply to courts of the first instance, the decisions of which may then be appealed against the Supreme Administrative Court of Lithuania. Rulings of the Supreme Administrative Court of Lithuania are final and not subject to appeal.

The Supreme Administrative Court is also the first and final instance for certain categories of administrative cases assigned to its jurisdiction by law. According to the Law on Administrative Proceedings, it hears petitions on the reopening of proceedings in administrative cases ended by res judicata court judgements, investigates requests by entities of municipal administration to present conclusions whether a member of municipal administration has broken an oath, as well as requests by State Data Protection Inspectorate to address EU judicial authority where European Commission decision is in doubt. Furthermore, resolution of disputes concerning breaches of the laws on election or referendum is also assigned to the jurisdiction of administrative courts. Persons specified in the Law on Presidential Elections, the Law on Elections to the Seimas, the Law on Referendum and the Law on Elections to Municipal Councils are entitled to file petitions concerning decisions of the Central Electoral Commission directly to the Supreme Administrative Court of Lithuania.

Since 2015 the Supreme Administrative Court of Lithuania is also assigned to hear cases concerning requests of municipal councils and to present conclusions as to whether a member of a municipal council or a mayor, against whom a procedure of loss of mandate has been started, has breached their oath and (or) failed to exercise the powers assigned to them by laws. The findings are final and not subject to appeal.

Certain individuals may apply directly to the Supreme Administrative Court of Lithuania in particular cases prescribed by law. For example, members of the Parliament of the Republic of Lithuania (the Seimas), courts and others.
