= Court of Appeal of Lithuania =

Court of Lithuania

Court of Appeal of the Republic of Lithuania
- Lietuvos Respublikos Apeliacinis Teismas
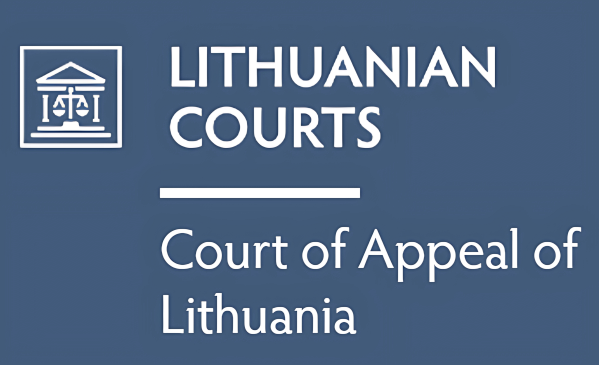
- Emblem of the Court
- Interactive map of Court of Appeal of the Republic of Lithuania
- Established: 1995; 31 years ago
- Jurisdiction: Lithuania
- Location: Vilnius, Lithuania
- Composition method: Appointed by the President of Lithuania with the consent of Seimas; Nominated by the Judicial Council
- Authorised by: Constitution of Lithuania
- Appeals to: Supreme Court of Lithuania
- Appeals from: Regional Courts
- Judge term length: Lifetime (mandatory retirement at the age of 65)
- Number of positions: 32
- Language: Lithuanian
- Website: https://www.apeliacinis.lt/

President of the Court of Appeal of Lithuania
- Currently: Vacant
- Since: 22 June 2026

Court of Appeal of the Republic of Lithuania (Lithuanian: Lietuvos Respublikos Apeliacinis Teismas) is the Appeal Court of the Republic of Lithuania, established by the Constitution of the Republic of Lithuania of 1992. it commenced its operations on January 1, 1995, following the enactment of the Law on Courts on May 31, 1994, which restructured the Lithuanian judicial system. The court is located in Vilnius.

== Functions ==
The Court of Appeal is appeal instance for cases heard by regional courts as courts of first instance. It also hears requests for the recognition of decisions of foreign or international courts and foreign or international arbitration awards and their enforcement in the Republic of Lithuania, as well as performs other functions assigned to the jurisdiction of this court by law. The President of the Court of Appeal organises and controls the administrative activities of the regional courts and their judges in accordance with the procedure prescribed by law.

== History ==
Early 20th Century

In 1918, following Lithuania's declaration of independence, the Supreme Tribunal of Lithuania was established as the highest court, serving both as a court of cassation and an administrative court. It was tasked with interpreting and consistently applying the laws. In 1933, a judicial reform led to the creation of a separate Appeals Chamber, effectively establishing a distinct appellate court.

Interwar Period

During the interwar period, the Appeals Chamber operated within the framework of the Supreme Tribunal, handling appeals from lower courts. This structure remained until the Soviet occupation in 1940.

Post-World War II

After World War II, under Soviet rule, the Lithuanian judicial system was reorganized to align with Soviet legal principles. The concept of an appellate court was reintroduced in 1958, with the establishment of the Klaipėda City Public Court, which served as an appellate body for the Klaipėda region.

Post-Independence

Following Lithuania's restoration of independence in 1990, the judicial system underwent significant reforms. In 1995, the Law on Courts established the current structure, including the Court of Appeal of Lithuania as a separate appellate body. This court reviews decisions from regional courts in civil, criminal, and administrative cases, ensuring the uniform application of law across the country.

== Composition ==
The Court of Appeal of Lithuania is composed of a President, who is responsible for overseeing the court's operations and ensuring the smooth functioning of its divisions. The court is organized into specialized divisions, each focusing on specific types of cases. These include the Civil Division, which handles disputes related to property, family law, and commercial matters; the Criminal Division, responsible for reviewing appeals in criminal cases; and the Administrative Division, which deals with cases related to public administration and regulatory issues.

Each division consists of a panel of judges who review and decide on cases within their respective areas.
