= Algimantas Valantinas =

Lithuanian judge

Algimantas Valantinas (born 29 October 1961) is a Lithuanian judge.

He was born in Buknaičiai and graduated from Vilnius University with a degree in law in 1985. He then worked as an investigator, assistant to prosecutor and a prosecutor in Kaišiadorys (1985–1988); prosecutor in Širvintos (1990–1991) and Jonava. He was a judge in Jonava (1994–1999) and Vilnius (2000–2005, from 2010).

He resigned in 2010 following criticism.

Valantinas speaks Lithuanian, English and Russian languages. Valantinas is married and has a son and daughter.
