= Supreme Court of Lithuania =

Supreme Court of the Republic of Lithuania
- Lietuvos Respublikos Aukščiausiasis Teismas
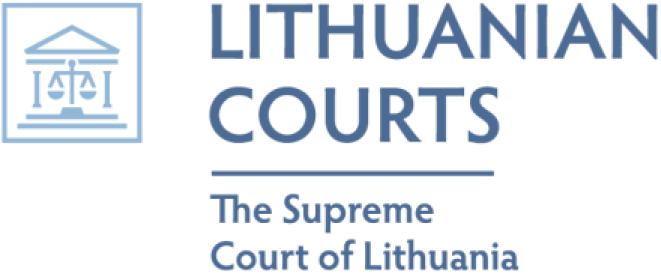
- Symbol of the Supreme Court of Lithuania

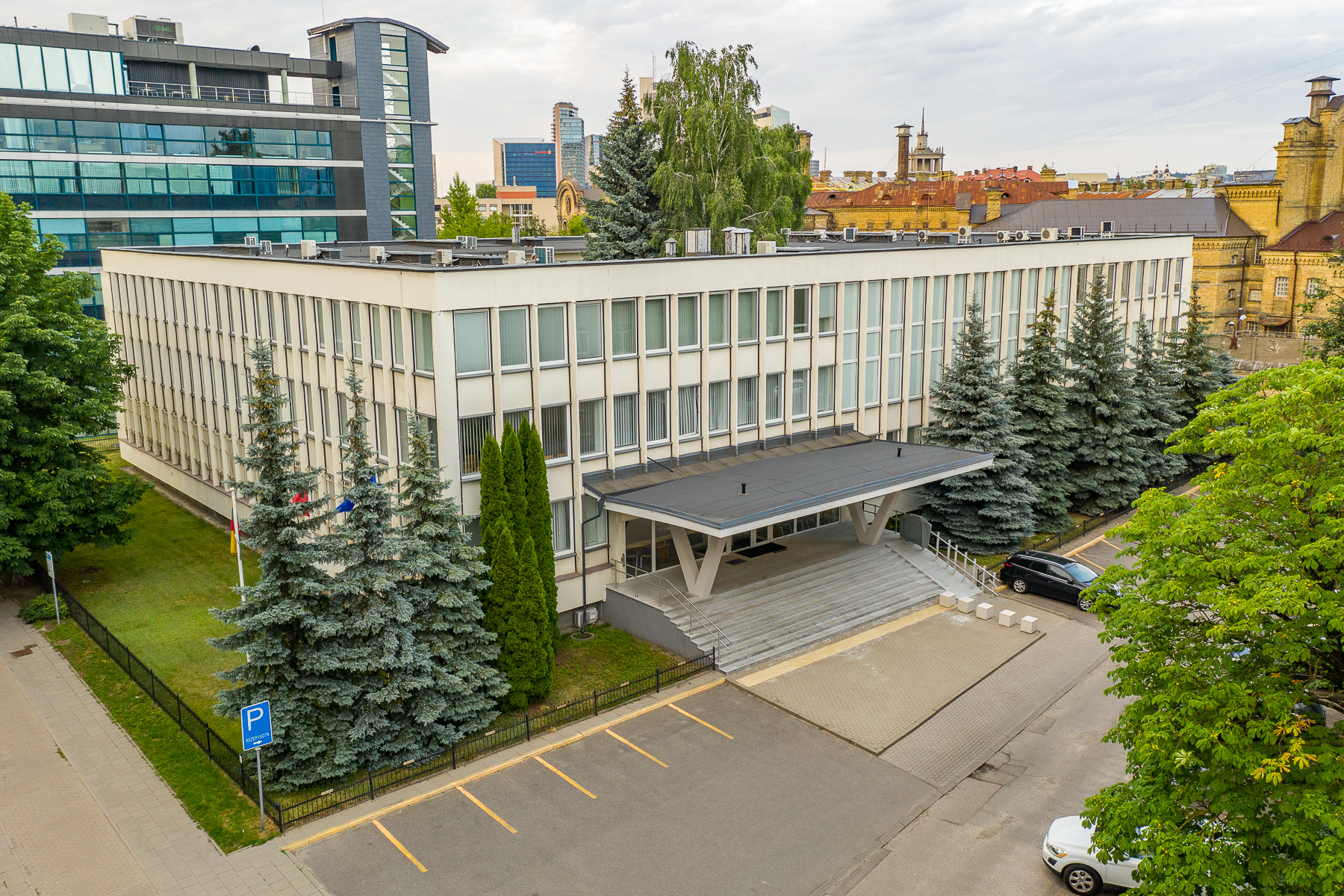
- Supreme Court of Lithuania in Naujamiestis, Vilnius
- Interactive map of Supreme Court of the Republic of Lithuania
- Established: 25 October 1992; 33 years ago
- Jurisdiction: Republic of Lithuania
- Location: Gynėjų g. 6, LT-01109 Vilnius, Lithuania
- Composition method: Appointed by President of Lithuania with consent of Seimas
- Authorised by: Constitution of Lithuania
- Judge term length: Lifetime (mandatory retirement at the age of 65)
- Number of positions: 37
- Language: Lithuanian
- Website: lat.lt

President
- Currently: Danguolė Bublienė
- Since: 27 March 2023

The Supreme Court of the Republic of Lithuania (Lithuanian: Lietuvos Respublikos Aukščiausiasis Teismas) is the only court of cassation in the Lithuania for reviewing effective judgements and rulings passed by the courts hearing criminal cases at the first and appeal instances as well as decisions and rulings in civil cases passed by the courts of appeals. It is the highest court of cassation, but it cannot interpret the constitution, since that is under the jurisdiction of the Constitutional Court of Lithuania. The current President of the Supreme Court of Lithuania is Danguolė Bublienė.

== History ==
The origins of the supreme court can be traced back to the Lithuanian Tribunal established in 1581, as it became the judicial branch in the Grand Duchy of Lithuania. The modern predecessor is the Supreme Tribunal of Lithuania (Lithuanian: Vyriausiasis Lietuvos Tribunolas) established in the Republic of Lithuania on 28 November 1918. Initially, the law described the tribunal as the highest court of appeals, but it could also take cases concerning the president or any of the ministers. Cassation was enacted on 15 June 1921. A separate Appeals Chamber (Lithuanian: Apeliaciniai Rūmai), as the court of appeals, was established in 1933 and the Supreme Tribunal became the court of cassation.

The Supreme Court in its current form was established by the 1992 Constitution of Lithuania. It began activities in 1994 when the law establishing the court came into force.

== Activities ==
According to Paragraph 2 of Article 23 of the Law on Courts, the Supreme Court shall develop a uniform case-law in the interpretation and application of statutes and other legal acts. A ruling passed by the court of cassation is final, cannot be appealed against and effective from the day of its adoption.

Cases before the Supreme Court are normally heard by a panel of three judges. In the instances where a cassation case involves a complicated issue of interpretation or application of laws, the President of the Supreme Court, the Chairman of the relevant Division, or a panel of judges may forward the case to be heard by an extended panel of seven judges or by a plenary session of the relevant Division.

== Composition ==
The Supreme Court has the Civil Division and the Criminal Division. The Supreme Court of Lithuania is composed of 37 judges.

=== Supreme Court Presidents ===
- Danguolė Bublienė (2023-)
- Gabriele Juodkaitė-Granskienė (acting)
- Sigita Rudėnaitė (acting)
- Gintaras Kryževičius (2009–2017)
- Vytautas Greičius (1999–2008)

=== Criminal Division Chairpersons ===
- Gabriele Juodkaitė-Granskienė (as of 2022)
- Aurelius Gutauskas
- Jonas Prapiestis (2007–)
- Algirdas Riepšas (2003–2007)
- Vytautas Greičius (1995–1999)

=== Civil Division Chairpersons ===
- Sigita Rudėnaitė
- Janina Stripeikienė (2007–)
